= 2026 Texas lieutenant gubernatorial election =

- November 3, 2026
- Reporting: 99% as of Nov. 16, 9:00 AM CST

Nominee	Vikki Goodwin	Dan Patrick
Party	Democratic	Republican
Popular vote	5,085,428	4,486,096
Percentage	51.7%	45.6%
- County results Goodwin: 40–50% 50–60% 60–70% 70–80% Patrick: 40–50% 50–60% 60–70% 70–80% 80–90% >90%
Lieutenant Governor before election
Dan Patrick
Republican
Elected Lieutenant Governor
Vikki Goodwin
Democratic

The 2026 Texas lieutenant gubernatorial election took place on November 3, 2026, to elect the lieutenant governor of Texas. Incumbent Republican Dan Patrick ran unsuccessfully for a fourth term, being defeated by Democratic nominee Vikki Goodwin. Primary elections were held on March 3, 2026, with a Democratic runoff election held on May 26.

Goodwin became the first female lieutenant governor in Texas history and the first Democrat elected Lieutenant Governor since 1994.

== Republican primary ==
=== Campaign ===
The incumbent Dan Patrick had announced in 2020 that if he won a third term in the 2022 election that it would be his final term in office. He backtracked this pledge in 2023 stating that he would "absolutely" run for a fourth term. He officially announced his campaign on April 11, 2025. He easily won the primary election against token oppositon.

=== Candidates ===
==== Nominee ====
- Dan Patrick, incumbent lieutenant governor (2015–present)

==== Eliminated in primary ====
- Perla Muñoz Hopkins, educator
- Timothy Mabry, business consultant
- Esala Wueschner, candidate for Austin City Council in 2022

=== Endorsements ===
Dan Patrick

Executive branch officials

- Donald Trump, president of the United States (2017–2021, 2025–present)

Governors

- Greg Abbott, Governor of Texas (2015-present)

Labor unions

- Combined Law Enforcement Associations of Texas

Organizations

- Texas Alliance for Life
- Texas Gun Rights

=== Polling ===
Poll source	Date(s) administered	Sample size (Note: Key: A – all adults RV – registered voters LV – likely voters V – unclear)	Margin of error	Perla Hopkins	Timothy Mabry	Dan Patrick	Esala Wueschner	Other
University of Texas/ Texas Politics Project	February 2–16, 2026	326 (LV)	± 5.4%	2%	3%	87%	1%	8% (Note: "Someone else" with 8%)

=== Results ===
Results by county Patrick: 60–70%; 70–80%; 80–90%; 90–100%

Republican primary results
Party	Candidate	Votes	%
Republican	Dan Patrick (incumbent)	1,784,213	84.7
Republican	Timothy Mabry	186,447	8.9
Republican	Perla Muñoz Hopkins	108,034	5.1
Republican	Esala Wueschner	27,186	1.3
Total votes		2,105,880	100.0

== Democratic primary ==
=== Campaign ===
State representative Vikki Goodwin began expressing interest in running for the lieutenant governor's office in 2023. She officially announced her campaign in May 2025. She quickly became the frontrunner securing endorsements from many state legislators and organizations. As the campaign progressed, Marcos Vélez a steelworker and union representative secured the endorsement of the Texas AFL-CIO and a growing number of donations made him an increasingly prevalent candidate in the primary. None of the candidates reached 50% in the primary, with Goodwin receiving only 48% percent of the vote. Vélez came in second with over 31% and proceeded to a runoff with Goodwin. Goodwin won the runoff by a wide margin.

=== Candidates ===
==== Nominee ====
- Vikki Goodwin, state representative from the 47th district (2019–present)

==== Eliminated in runoff ====
- Marcos Vélez, union representative

==== Eliminated in primary ====
- Courtney Head, contracts and privacy manager

==== Declined ====
- Joaquin Castro, U.S. representative from Texas’s 20th congressional district (2013–present) (running for re-election)
- Veronica Escobar, U.S. representative from Texas’s 16th congressional district (2019–present) (running for re-election)
- Nathan Johnson, state senator from the 16th district (2019–present) (running for attorney general)

=== Endorsements ===
Vikki Goodwin

U.S. representatives

- Greg Casar, TX-35 (2023–present) and chair of the Congressional Progressive Caucus
- Lloyd Doggett, TX-37 (1995–present)
- John Bryant, TX-5 (1983–1987) and State Representative from HD-114 (2023–present)

State Legislators

- Alma Allen, HD-131 (2005–present)
- Diego Bernal, HD-123 (2015–present)
- Salman Bhojani, HD-92 (2023–present)
- Rhetta Bowers, HD-113 (2019–present)
- John Bucy III, HD-136 (2019–present)
- Liz Campos, HD-119 (2021–present)
- Sheryl Cole, HD-46 (2019–present)
- Nicole Collier, HD-95 (2013–present)
- Lulu Flores, HD-51 (2023–present)
- Sarah Eckhardt, SD-14 (2020–present) and Texas Comptroller of Public Accounts nominee
- Erin Gamez, HD-38 (2022–present)
- Josey Garcia, HD-124 (2023–present)
- Barbara Gervin-Hawkins, HD-120 (2017–present)
- Jessica González, HD-104 (2019–present)
- Mary González, HD-75 (2013–present)
- Cassandra Hernandez, HD-115 (2025–present)
- Donna Howard, HD-48 (2006–present)
- Jolanda Jones, HD-147 (2022–present)
- Venton Jones, HD-100 (2023–present)
- Suleman Lalani, HD-76 (2023–present)
- Ray Lopez, HD-125 (2019–present)
- Christian Manuel, HD-22 (2023–present)
- Terry Meza, HD-105 (2019–present)
- Joe Moody, HD-78 (2009–2011;2013–present)
- Christina Morales, HD-145 (2019–present)
- Penny Morales Shaw, HD-148 (2021–present)
- Claudia Ordaz, HD-79 (2021–present)
- Mihaela Plesa, HD-70 (2023–present)
- Ramon Romero Jr., HD-90 (2015–present)
- Ron Reynolds, HD-27 (2011–present)
- Ana-Maria Ramos, HD-102 (2019–present)
- Jon Rosenthal, HD-135 (2019–present) and Texas Railroad Commission nominee
- Chris Turner, HD-101 (2013–present)
- Erin Zwiener, HD-45 (2019–present)

Organizations

- Center for Freethought Equality

Newspapers

- Austin American-Statesman
- Dallas Morning News
- Fort Worth Star-Telegram
- Houston Chronicle
- San Antonio Express-News
- The Austin Chronicle
Marcos Vélez

U.S. representatives

- Colin Allred, former TX-32 (2019–2025), and 2024 U.S. senate nominee (Note: Endorsement received after the first round of primary voting took place.)

Labor unions

- Texas AFL-CIO

Organizations

- Houston LGBTQ+ Political Caucus

=== First round ===
==== Polling ====
Poll source	Date(s) administered	Sample size	Margin of error	Vikki Goodwin	Courtney Head	Marcos Velez	Other
University of Texas/ Texas Politics Project	February 2–16, 2026	181 (LV)	± 7.3%	63%	10%	15%	12% (Note: "Someone else" with 12%)

First round results by county: Goodwin: 30–40%; 40–50%; 50–60%; 60–70%; 80–90%; Vélez: 30–40%; 40–50%; 50–60%; 60–70%; 70–80%; >90%; Head: 30–40%; 60–70%; Tie: Tie

==== Results ====
Democratic primary results
Party	Candidate	Votes	%
Democratic	Vikki Goodwin	1,012,055	48.0
Democratic	Marcos Isaias Vélez	663,499	31.5
Democratic	Courtney Head	431,833	20.5
Total votes		2,107,387	100.0

=== Runoff ===
==== Results ====
Runoff results by county Goodwin: 50–60%; 60–70%; 80–90%; Vélez: 50–60%; 60–70%; 70–80%; 90–100%; Tie No votes

Democratic primary runoff results
Party	Candidate	Votes	%
Democratic	Vikki Goodwin	376,757	67.8
Democratic	Marcos Isaias Vélez	179,238	32.2
Total votes		555,995	100.0

== Third-party and independent candidates ==
=== Candidates ===
==== Declared ====
- Anthony Cristo (Libertarian), teacher, nominee for Texas's 15th congressional district in 2018, and nominee for Texas's 34th congressional district in 2020
- Kevin McCormick (Green), former teacher

===== Write-in =====
- Arturo Espinosa
- Stephen Samuelson

==== Did not qualify ====
- Mike Collier (Independent), certified public accountant, Democratic nominee for Lt. Governor in 2018 and 2022, Democratic nominee for Comptroller in 2014
- Jeffery Wayne Marshall (Independent)

== General election ==
Patrick's status as one of the most powerful officeholders in the state made any campaign against him seem like a longshot. Patrick also possessed a significant fundraising advantage starting the race with more than $33 million.

Following the primary election, Mike Collier, an independent candidate who had been the Democratic candidate for the office in 2018 and 2022, filed a suit arguing that the requirements for an independent candidate to get on the statewide ballot were too burdensome to be practicable. Under current law, independent candidates have 30 days after the primary runoff election in which the candidate must submit a petition with the number of signatures equal to 1% of the total vote for governor in the preceding election (81,000 for the 2026 ballot). If someone voted in either party’s primary they are ineligible to sign an independent candidate’s petition. Collier failed to secure a court order to be placed on the November ballot, but the case regarding the constitutionality of the signature rule is still ongoing.

The race was relatively quiet to begin as Patrick spent most of his efforts campaigning against James Talarico, the Democratic nominee in the concurrent U.S. Senate race. Patrick and Goodwin did not have a debate following a pattern of other statewide races. Patrick did not address Goodwin by name in his campaign ads until late August.

Patrick's campaign accused Goodwin, who had consistently been ranked one of the most progressive members of the state legislature, of being in support of DEI, pornography in schools, and transgender women in sports and that as such she was too "woke" and far-left for the Texas electorate. Patrick also claimed that Goodwin wanted to raise property and gas taxes as well as introduce a state income tax. Goodwin insisted that her campaign was not focused on culture war issues.

THC and cannabis legalization was a major issue of the campaign with Goodwin highlighting Patrick's role in the recent rollback on access to smokable hemp and delta-8-THC products in the state. During the 2025 legislative session Patrick championed a complete ban on the products. The ban had provoked widespread backlash from veterans and businesses. Goodwin campaigned on a policy of regulation and taxation.

Patrick's campaign used AI generated content extensively in their campaign materials. On September 19, 2026, Goodwin filed a police complaint with the Travis County Sheriff’s Office against Patrick for posting two AI-generated advertisements depicting Goodwin. She alleged that the videos violated a 2019 Texas law making it a criminal offense to publish or distribute deceptive AI-generated deepfake videos targeting political candidates within 30 days of an election because in-person early voting begins on October 19, 2026. Patrick's campaign denied it broke the law but took down the advertisements the following day.

=== Post-primary endorsements ===
Vikki Goodwin (D)

U.S. senators

- Bernie Sanders, U.S. senator from Vermont (Independent)

Labor unions

- United Auto Workers

Organizations

- EMILYs List

Newspapers

- Austin American-Statesman
- Houston Chronicle
- San Antonio Express-News
Declined to endorse
- The Dallas Morning News

=== Fundraising ===
Campaign finance reports as of October 24, 2026
Candidate	Raised	Spent	Cash on hand
Dan Patrick (R)	$17,269,720	$39,759,435	$11,320,191
Vikki Goodwin (D)	$2,322,760	$2,254,711	$90,896
Anthony Cristo (L)	$2,259	$3,151	$748
Kevin McCormick (G)	$301	$12,745	$0
Source: Texas Ethics Commission

=== Polling ===
Poll source	Date(s) administered	Sample size	Margin of error	Dan Patrick (R)	Vikki Goodwin (D)	Other	Undecided
Texas Southern University	October 21–25, 2026	2,000 (LV)	± 2.2%	49%	45%	3% (Note: Anthony Cristo (L) with 2%; Kevin McCormick (G) with 1%)	3%
Texas Public Opinion Research	October 15–18, 2026	969 (LV)	± 3.9%	50%	47%	2% (Note: Anthony Cristo (L) with 2%; Kevin McCormick (G) with 0%)	1%
University of Houston	October 10–14, 2026	2,000 (LV)	± 2.2%	47%	42%	2% (Note: Anthony Cristo (L) with 3%; Kevin McCormick with 1%)	7%
University of Texas/Texas Politics Project	September 25 – October 5, 2026	861 (LV)	± 3.3%	46%	49%	5% (Note: Anthony Cristo (L) with 2%; Kevin McCormick with 1%; "Someone else" with 2%)	—
Stratus Intelligence (R)	September 22–24, 2026	865 (LV)	± 3.5%	49%	44%	—	7%
Texas Public Opinion Research	September 19–22, 2026	1,007 (LV)	± 3.6%	47%	44%	3% (Note: Anthony Cristo (L) with 2%; Kevin McCormick (G) with 1%)	6%
Texas Southern University	September 15–19, 2026	1,800 (LV)	± 2.3%	47%	41%	3% (Note: Anthony Cristo (L) with 2%; Kevin McCormick (G) with 1%)	9%
ReconMR/Siena University	September 8–11, 2026	614 (LV)	± 4.3%	46%	47%	1%	5%
Texas Public Opinion Research	August 21–24, 2026	1,000 (LV)	± 3.3%	47% (Note: With voters who lean towards a given candidate)	41%	4% (Note: "Would not vote in that race" with 2%; Anthony Cristo (L) & Jeffrey Marshall (I) with 1%)	8%
University of Texas/Texas Politics Project	August 5–13, 2026	1,200 (RV)	± 2.83%	42%	35%	7% (Note: Anthony Cristo (L) with 4%; Someone else with 2%; Kevin McCormick (G) with 1%)	16%
Texas A&M University/ReconMR/Siena University	July 27–30, 2026	619 (LV)	± 4.7%	46%	48%		6%
Texas Southern University	July 27–30, 2026	1,200 (LV)	± 2.8%	46%	39%	3% (Note: Anthony Cristo (L) with 3%)	12%
University of Texas/YouGov	June 5–12, 2026	1,200 (RV)	± 3.47%	43%	36%	5% (Note: "Someone else with 3%; Anthony Cristo (L) with 2%; Kevin McCormick (G) with 1%)	16%
Texas A&M University/ReconMR	June 1–4, 2026	807 (LV)	± 4%	49%	44%	2% (Note: "Wouldn't vote" with 1%; "Someone else" with 1%)	5%
Texas Southern University/YouGov	April 22 – May 5, 2026	1,223 (LV)	± 2.8%	47%	40%	4% (Note: Anthony Cristo (L) with 3%; Kevin McCormick (G) with 1%)	9%
University of Texas/Texas Politics Project	April 10–20, 2026	1,200 (RV)	± 2.83% (Note: ±3.35% adjusted for weighting)	35%	31%	7%	27%
UT Tyler	February 13–22, 2026	1,117 (RV)	± 3.1%	47%	42%	–	11%
University of Texas/Texas Politics Project	February 2–16, 2026	1,300 (RV)	± 5.1%	37%	31%	8%	25%
University of Houston/YouGov	January 20–31, 2026	1,502 (LV)	± 2.5%	46%	41%	4% (Note: Anthony Cristo (L) with 4%)	9%
UT Tyler	May 28 – June 7, 2025	1,154 (RV)	± 3.0%	46%	42%	–	12%

=== Results ===
2026 Texas lieutenant gubernatorial election
Party	Candidate	Votes	%	±%
Democratic	Vikki Goodwin	5,085,428	51.7	
Republican	Dan Patrick (incumbent)	4,486,096	45.6	
Libertarian	Anthony Cristo	170,509	1.7	
Green	Kevin McCormick	88,076	0.9	
Write-in		1,340	0.0	
Total votes		9,831,449	100.0%	
Democratic gain from Republican				

== See also ==
- 2026 United States lieutenant gubernatorial elections
- 2026 Texas elections
