= 2026 Williamson County, Texas Judge election =

Local election in Texas, US

2026 Williamson County Judge election
- November 3, 2026
| Candidate | Heather Jefts | Steve Snell |
| Party | Democratic | Republican |
| Popular vote | 148,887 | 122,196 |
| Percentage | 54.92% | 45.08% |
- Results by precinct Jefts: 50–60% 60–70% 70–80% 80–90% Snell: 50–60% 60–70% 70–80%
County Judge before election
Steve Snell
Republican
Elected County Judge
Heather Jefts
Democratic

The 2026 Williamson County Judge election was held on November 3, 2026, to elect the county judge of Williamson County, Texas. Primary elections were held on March 3. Incumbent Republican judge Steve Snell was appointed in 2025 and ran for re-election. He was defeated by Democratic nominee Heather Jefts.

== Republican primary ==
=== Candidates ===
==== Nominee ====
- Steve Snell, incumbent county judge

=== Results ===
Republican primary
| Party | Candidate | Votes | % |
|---|---|---|---|
| Republican | Steve Snell (incumbent) | 41,622 | 100.00 |
| Total votes | | 41,622 | 100.00 |

== Democratic primary ==
=== Candidates ===
==== Nominee ====
- Heather Jefts, former member of the Cedar Park city council

=== Results ===
Democratic primary
| Party | Candidate | Votes | % |
|---|---|---|---|
| Democratic | Heather Jefts | 54,395 | 100.00 |
| Total votes | | 54,395 | 100.00 |

== General election ==
=== Endorsements ===
Heather Jefts (D)

State legislators

- John Bucy III, state representative from the 136th district
- Sarah Eckhardt, state senator from the 14th district
- Vikki Goodwin, state representative from the 47th district and nominee for lieutenant governor in 2026
- Diana Maldonado, former state representative from the 52nd district
- Gene Wu, state representative from the 137th district
- Erin Zwiener, state representative from the 45th district

Organizations

- Annie's List

=== Results ===
2026 Williamson County Judge election
| Party | Candidate | Votes | % |
|---|---|---|---|
| Democratic | Heather Jefts | 148,887 | 54.92 |
| Republican | Steven Snell (incumbent) | 122,196 | 45.08 |
| Total votes | | 271,083 | 100.00 |
