= Pooja Sethi =

Texas politician

- Sethi in 2025

Member-elect of the Texas House of Representatives from the 47th district
- Assuming office TBD
- Succeeding: Vikki Goodwin

Personal details
- Born: U.S.
- Party: Democratic
- Education: George Washington University (BA); Syracuse University (JD)
- Website: Campaign website

Pooja Sethi is an American politician and attorney who is a member-elect of the Texas House of Representatives from the 47th district. A member of the Democratic Party, Sethi was elected in 2026 to succeed Vikki Goodwin, whom she previously served as chief of staff for.

== Early life and career ==
Sethi was born in the United States and earned a Bachelor of Arts from George Washington University followed by a Juris Doctor from Syracuse University.

Sethi was previously an immigration attorney and CEO of the Law Offices of Pooja Sethi, PLLC, and founded nonprofit Immigration For All.

== Political career ==
Sethi served as chief of staff to state representative Vikki Goodwin from 2021 to 2025 and chair of the Travis County Democratic Party from 2024 to 2025.

=== 2020 Austin City Council campaign ===
Sethi ran for the 10th district of the Austin City Council in 2020, placing third behind incumbent Alison Alter and Jennifer Virden. During a virtual candidate forum hosted by KUT and the Austin Monitor in October, she expressed support for Project Connect and revising the city's land development code to encourage transit-oriented development.

=== Texas House of Representatives ===
In 2026, Sethi ran for the Texas House of Representatives to succeed Goodwin, who retired to run for lieutenant governor.

Turning Point USA commentator Savanah Hernandez posted a photo of a Sethi campaign sign with the caption "Welcome to politics in Texas:" on X in February 2026, inciting anti-Indian and xenophobic rhetoric. Commentors proceeded to use the phrase "Don't Pooja my Texas" as a racist slogan. Sethi responded "My heritage isn’t an insult. It’s my story. And like millions of Americans, it’s rooted in hard work, faith in this country, and service to our community. If that bothers you, that says more about you than it does about me."

In the November general election, Sethi defeated Republican nominee Jennifer Mushtaler. She is the first South Asian woman and the first Hindu elected to the Texas State Legislature.

== Electoral history ==
=== 2026 ===
State Representative District 47 Election

Party	Candidate	Votes
REPUBLICAN	Jennifer Mushtaler	33,291
DEMOCRATIC	Pooja Sethi	57,543

=== 2020 ===
2020 Austin District 10 election
Candidate	Votes	%
Alison Alter (incumbent)	15,640	34.17
Jennifer Virden	11,637	25.42
Pooja Sethi	8,295	18.12
Robert Thomas	7,599	16.60
Belinda Greene	1,364	2.98
Ben Easton	847	1.85
Noel Tristan	390	0.85
Total votes	45,772	100
