= Robert Richardson =

Rob, Bob, Bobby, Bobbie or Robert Richardson may refer to:

== Entertainment ==
- Bob Richardson (animator) (born 1942), American animator
- Bob Richardson (photographer) (Robert George Richardson, 1928–2005), American fashion artist and teacher
- Robert Richardson (cinematographer) (Robert Bridge Richardson, born 1955), American cinematographer
- Rob Richardson, American developer in 2014 of mobile app Pocket Points
- Dick Robertson (songwriter) (Richard Joseph Robertson, 1903–1979), pseudonym Bob Richardson, American songwriter

== Military ==
- Robert Richardson (British Army officer) (Robert Francis Richardson, 1929–2014)
- Robert Richardson (RAAF officer) (Robert Victor Richardson, born 1941)
- Robert C. Richardson Jr. (Robert Charlwood Richardson, 1882–1954), American Army general during World Wars I and II
- Robert C. Richardson III (Robert Charlwood Richardson, 1918–2011), American Army brigadier general, son of above
- Robert V. Richardson (Robert Vinkler Richardson 1820–1870), American Civil War Confederate general

== Politicians and public officials ==
- Robert Richardson (Labour politician) (1862–1943), British MP 1918–1931
- Robert Richardson (Lord Treasurer) (before 1512—1578), Scottish cleric and royal administrator
- Robert A. Richardson (1827–1895), American jurist on Virginia Supreme Court of Appeals
- Bert Richardson (judge) (Robert Carl Richardson, born 1956), American judge on Texas Court of Criminal Appeals
- Bobbie Richardson (born 1949), American politician from North Carolina
- Bob Richardson (politician) (1945–2017), American politician from Texas

== Sportspeople ==
- Robert Richardson (alpine skier) (1927–2004), Canadian alpine skier
- Robert Richardson (sitting volleyball) (born 1982), British Paralympian
- Robert Richardson Jr. (racing driver) (born 1982), American NASCAR veteran
- Bob Richardson (Canadian football) (born 1948), slotback
- Bob Richardson (defensive back) (Robert George Richardson, 1944–2020), American and Canadian football player
- Bobby Richardson (born 1935), American baseball second baseman
- Bobby Richardson (gridiron football) (born 1992), American defensive end

== Science ==
- Robert Coleman Richardson (1937–2013), American physicist and author, 1996 Nobel Prize recipient
- Robert Earl Richardson (1877–1935), American ichthyologist and author of The Fishes of Illinois
- Robert S. Richardson (Robert Shirley Richardson, 1902–1981), American astronomer and science fiction writer as Philip Latham

== Writers ==
- Robert Richardson (poet) (1850–1901), Australian journalist and children's author
- Robert Richardson (religion) (1806–1876), American physician, academic and magazine editor
- Robert Richardson (travel writer) (1779–1847), Scottish physician and author of travel literature
- Robert D. Richardson (Robert Dale Richardson III, 1934–2020), American historian and biographer
- Robert Lorne Richardson (1860–1921), Canadian journalist and politician
- Robert W. Richardson (1910–2007), American railroad historian and editor

== Other people ==
- Robert Richardson (priest) (1732–1781), English divine
