= Naishtat =

Naishtat is a surname. Notable people with the surname include:

- Benjamín Naishtat (born 1986), Argentine film director
- Francisco Samuel Naishtat (born 1958), Argentine philosopher and academic
- Elliott Naishtat (born 1945), American politician
