= Laura Thompson (politician) =

American politician

Member of the Texas House of Representatives from the 120th district
- In office August 2, 2016 – January 9, 2017
- Preceded by: Ruth McClendon
- Succeeded by: Barbara Gervin-Hawkins

Personal details
- Party: Independent
- Education: Howard University
- Occupation: Freelance writer

Laura Thompson is a former independent member of the Texas House of Representatives. She represented District 120 after winning a special election on August 2, 2016, after former state representative Ruth McClendon retired. In the November 2016 general election, she ran for election to a full term but was defeated by Barbara Gervin-Hawkins. Thompson's brief tenure in the Texas House ended on January 9, 2017. Thompson was the first independent to serve in the Texas Legislature in over fifty years.

In October 2016, Democratic Party officials in Bexar County unsuccessfully sued to remove Thompson's name from the ballot in the November 2016 election, claiming that her nomination papers lacked enough valid signatures. On October 20, she was arrested and charged with a Class A misdemeanor for assault and bodily injury on a family member over an incident in 2012.
