= Cindy Burkett =

American politician

Member of the Texas State Independent Living Council
- Incumbent
- Assumed office December 5, 2024
- Governor: Greg Abbott
- Preceded by: Janet M. McSorley

Member of the Texas House of Representatives
- In office January 11, 2011 – January 8, 2019
- Preceded by: Robert Miklos
- Succeeded by: Rhetta Bowers
- Constituency: 101st district (2011–2013); 113th district (2013–2019)

Personal details
- Party: Republican
- Education: University of Texas at Arlington

Cindy Burkett is an American politician serving as a member of the Texas State Independent Living Council since 2024. A member of the Republican Party, she served in the Texas House of Representatives from 2011 to 2019.
