= Montserrat Garibay =

American politician

- Garibay in 2018

Member-elect of the Texas House of Representatives from the 49th district
- Assuming office January 2027
- Succeeding: Gina Hinojosa

Personal details
- Born: Mexico City, Mexico
- Party: Democratic
- Education: Austin Community College; University of Texas at Austin (BS, BA, MEd)
- Website: Campaign website

Montserrat Garibay is a Mexican-born American politician and labor organizer. A member of the Democratic party, she was elected to the Texas House of Representatives for the 49th district in the 2026 election to replace Gina Hinojosa.

== Early life and education ==
Garibay was born in Mexico City and came to the United States fleeing family violence with her mother and sister as an undocumented child in 1992. She attended Murchison Middle School and Anderson High School in the Austin Independent School District. She completed her general coursework at Austin Community College and graduated from the University of Texas at Austin with a Bachelor of Science, a Bachelor of Arts, and a Master of Education.

== Career ==
Garibay was a superdelegate for Hillary Clinton at the 2016 Democratic National Convention. She worked as a bilingual pre-kindergarten teacher at Lucy Read Pre-K Demonstration School in the Austin Independent School District and was on the executive board of Education Austin before she became the secretary-treasurer of the Texas AFL-CIO. In 2021, Garibay was named the senior liaison for labor relations in the office of the secretary at the United States Department of Education.

=== Texas House of Representatives ===
Garibay entered the race for Texas's 49th House of Representatives district to succeed Gina Hinojosa. She received the most votes in the Democratic party primary election and advanced to a runoff election against Kathie Tovo, a former Austin City Councilwoman. Garibay defeated Tovo in the runoff election and won the general election against the Green party candidate and University of Texas at Austin student Arshia Papari.

== Personal life ==
Garibay became an American citizen in 2012.
