= Kendall Scudder =

Texas Democratic Party chair

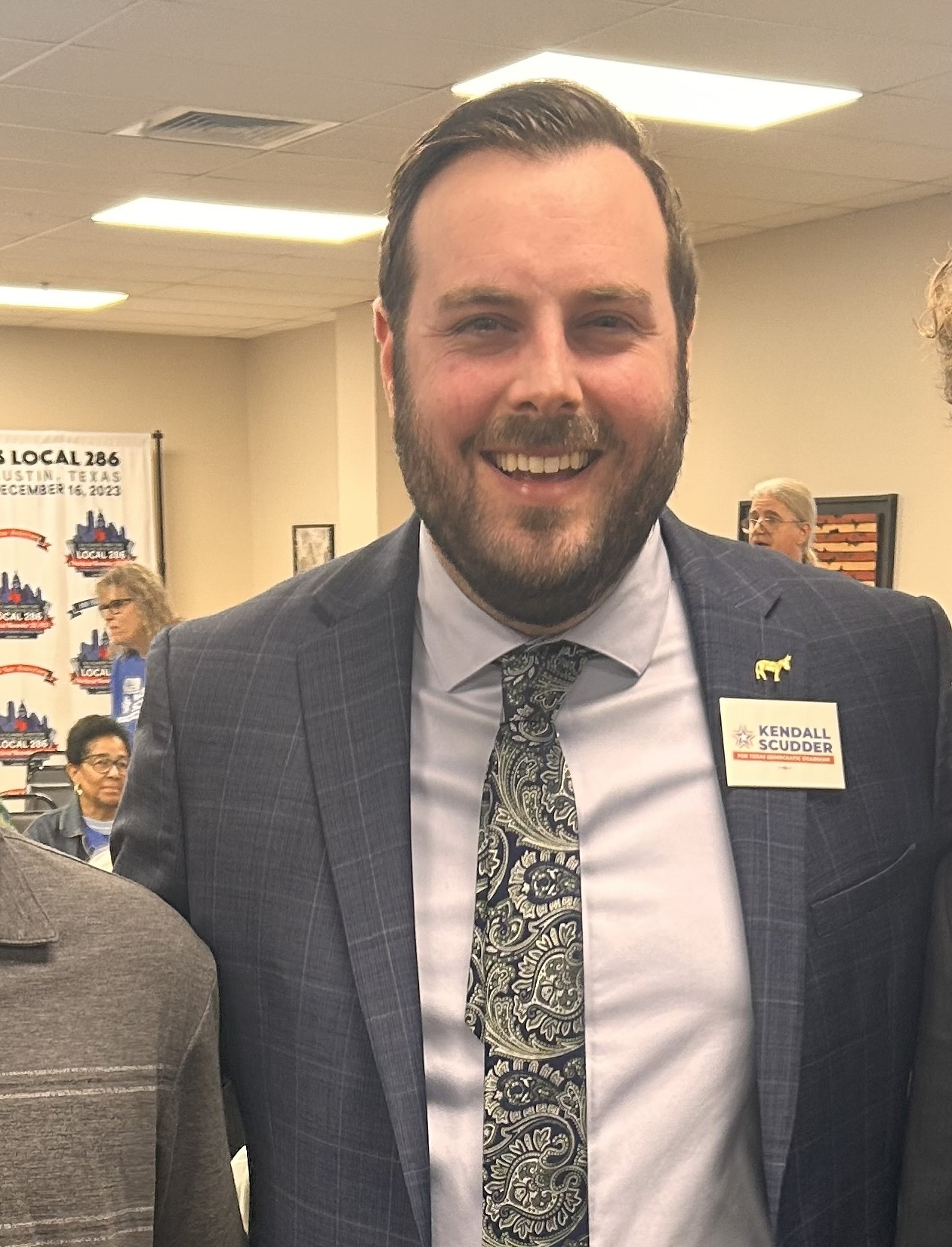
- Scudder in 2025

Chair of the Texas Democratic Party
- Incumbent
- Assumed office March 29, 2025
- Preceded by: Gilberto Hinojosa

Personal details
- Born: February 23, 1990 (age 36) New Boston, Texas, U.S.
- Party: Democratic
- Education: Sam Houston State University (BA); George Washington University (MA)

Kendall Scudder (born February 23, 1990) is the current chair of the Texas Democratic Party. Elected at 35 years old, Scudder is one of the youngest chairs of a state political party in the United States.

== Early life ==
Scudder was born in New Boston, Texas and grew up in Bowie County. He graduated from Sulphur Springs High School in 2008. Growing up with two moms, he first became involved in politics in the early 2000s, knocking on doors against a campaign to label LGBTQ+ people as unfit to be parents. He later attended Sam Houston State University. During his time there, he was involved with political activism and the Texas College Democrats. He graduated with a degree in political science. He later obtained a master's degree in political management from George Washington University.

== Career ==
Scudder's political work began with Texas College Democrats while an undergraduate at Sam Houston State University.

In 2018, Scudder ran for the Texas Senate, losing in the general election to incumbent Bob Hall. In 2022, he ran in the Democratic Primary Election for Texas House District 114, failing to advance to the runoff. Scudder served as Vice Chair of Finance for the Texas Democratic Party. In March of 2024, he was elected to the Dallas Central Appraisal District Board of Directors, Pos. 2, a position he held until becoming chairman.

In March 2025, Scudder was elected to the remainder of a four-year term as chair of the Texas Democratic Party, succeeding Gilberto Hinojosa. In June 2026, Scudder was elected to a full term in his own right, beating out two former staffers.

Under his leadership, the Texas Democratic Party moved its office headquarters from Austin to Dallas.

Party political offices
Preceded by Gilberto Hinojosa	Chair of the Texas Democratic Party; 2025–present	Incumbent
