= Texas Democratic Party =

Texas affiliate of the Democratic Party

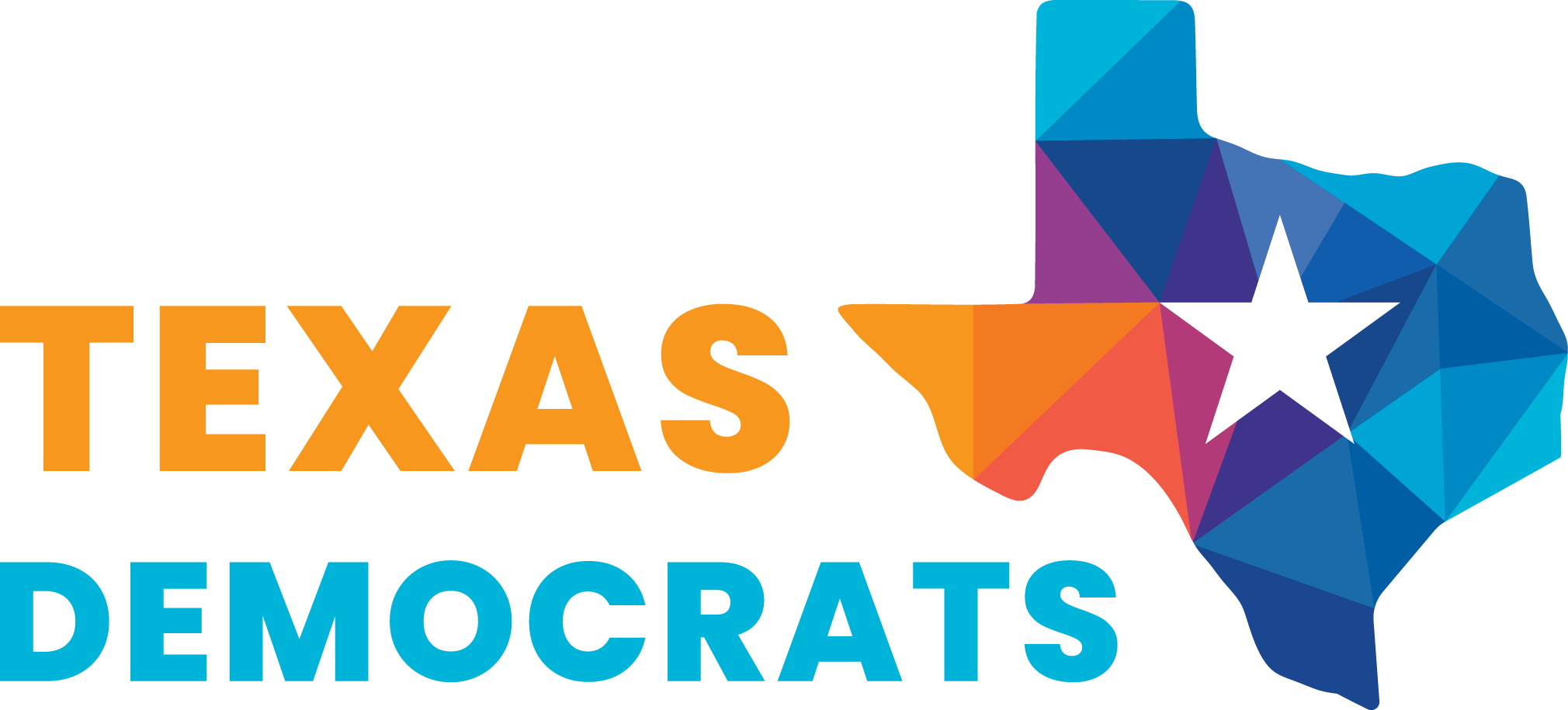
- Chairperson: Kendall Scudder
- Governor-elect: Gina Hinojosa
- Lieutenant Governor-elect: Vikki Goodwin
- Senate Minority Leader: Carol Alvarado
- House Minority Leader: Gene Wu
- Founded: 1846; 179 years ago
- Headquarters: Dallas, Texas
- Membership (2025): ▲8,113,683
- Ideology: Liberalism
- Political position: Center to center-left
- National affiliation: Democratic Party
- Colors: Blue
- Texas Senate: 12 / 31
- Texas House of Representatives: 62 / 150
- Statewide Executive Offices: 0 / 9
- Board of Education: 4 / 15
- United States Senate: 0 / 2
- United States House of Representatives: 13 / 38
- Supreme Court of Texas: 0 / 9

Election symbol

Website
- www.txdemocrats.org

The Texas Democratic Party is the affiliate of the Democratic Party in the U.S. state of Texas and one of the two major political parties in the state. The party's headquarters are in Dallas, Texas.

President Lyndon B. Johnson was a Texas Democrat. 39 out of the 48 politicians who have served as Governor of Texas have been Texas Democrats. The party used to be the dominant political party in Texas; however, like in other Southern states, its rival, the Republican Party of Texas has become the dominant party since the 1990s. Following the 1994 elections, no Democrat won any statewide election in Texas until 2026. At 32 years, Texas had the longest streak of any state for not electing Democrats to any statewide office, and has not voted Democratic in a presidential election since 1976.

The party used to support racial segregation and held white-only primaries until the Texas primary cases; however, it has adopted liberal attitudes on race and other matters since the 1960s.

Similar to the national Democratic Party, Texas Democrats currently support increasing educational funding, abortion access, cannabis legalization, LGBT rights, environmentalism, gun control, Medicaid expansion, and raising the minimum wage. Black Texans, Latino Texans, young Texans, and Texans who live in urban areas are more likely to support the party than other demographic groups. However, Latino Texans had shifted towards the Republican Party in recent elections before returning to the Democrats in 2026.

The party experienced an enormous resurgence in the 2026 elections, sweeping all statewide offices, flipping the Texas House and electing a Democrat to the Senate for the first time in 38 years.

== History ==
Prior to the Annexation of Texas, the Democratic Party had a foothold in the politics of the region. A powerful group of men that called themselves the "Texas Association" served as an early prototype for the Democratic Party of Texas. The Texas Association drew its membership from successful merchants, doctors, and lawyers, often traveling from Tennessee. Many members of the Texas Association were close friends of Andrew Jackson, and most had strong ties to the Democratic Party. Similarly, most of the other settlers in Texas were from states in the South, and white American southerners of this era generally held strong allegiances to the Democratic Party.

In 1845, the 29th United States Congress approved the Texas Constitution and President James K. Polk signed the act admitting Texas as a state on December 29. In 1848, the party convention system was adopted, and it quickly became the primary method of selecting candidates for the Texas Democratic Party. In the period prior to the Civil War, national politics influenced the state party's perspective. Texas Democrats began to discard Jacksonian nationalism in favor of the states' rights agenda of the Deep South. A conflict emerged within the Party between a minority of pro-Union Democrats and a majority of secessionists. During the war, supporters of the Union disappeared from the political scene or moved north. Those who stayed politically active supported the Confederacy. During Reconstruction, the rift between Unionist and Secessionist Democrats remained. For a short period immediately after the war, the Texas Democratic Party was a formidable political force, but they quickly split apart because their positions on freedmen varied greatly; some supported basic civil rights, while most opposed anything more than emancipation. As a result, Republicans captured both the governor's office and the Texas Legislature in 1869, but Republican political dominance in the post-Civil War era was short-lived. By 1872, the Texas Democrats had consolidated their party and taken over the Texas legislature. For the remainder of the 19th century and well into the 20th, Democrats dominated Texas politics and Republicans were minor political players.

In the presidential election of 1928, anti-Catholicism in Texas and across the country swung Texas away from Democratic presidential nominee Al Smith, the first time it ever voted against a Democrat in a presidential election. However, it was not until the middle of the 20th century that the Democrats began to face a growing challenge from the Republican Party in earnest. The 1950s was a decade of factionalism and infighting for the Texas Democratic Party, mainly between liberal and conservative Democrats, and the Republicans managed to carry Texas for native Dwight D. Eisenhower in 1952 and 1956. Cohesion returned to the party in the 1960s, and the Democratic ticket carried Texas in the 1960 presidential election with prominent Texas Senator Lyndon B. Johnson running for Vice President.

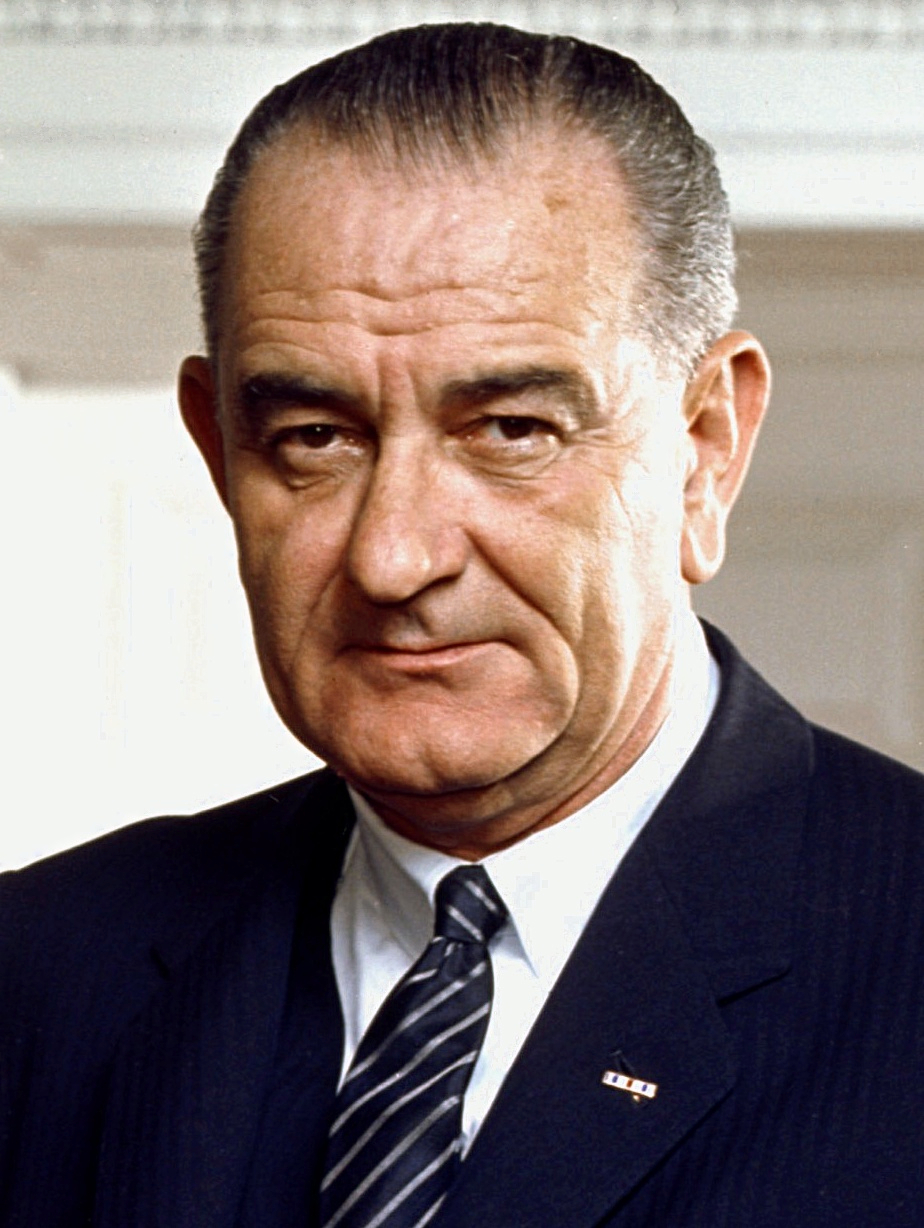
Lyndon B. Johnson is considered one of the most prominent Democrats in Texas history. He served in the Texas House of Representatives from 1937 to 1949, the United States Senate from 1949 to 1961, Vice President of the United States from 1961 to 1963, and President of the United States from 1963 to 1969.

In 1962, John B. Connally, a moderate Democrat, was elected Governor of Texas. The next year, the assassination of President John F. Kennedy on a trip to Dallas created further impetus to bridge the gap between liberal and moderate Texas Democrats; Party unity was solidified with Johnson's ensuing Presidency and the drubbing of Barry Goldwater in the 1964 presidential election. In 1964, Johnson carried his home state with ease, but liberal forces in Texas were in decline. In the 1968 presidential election, Democrat Hubert Humphrey barely managed to win Texas.

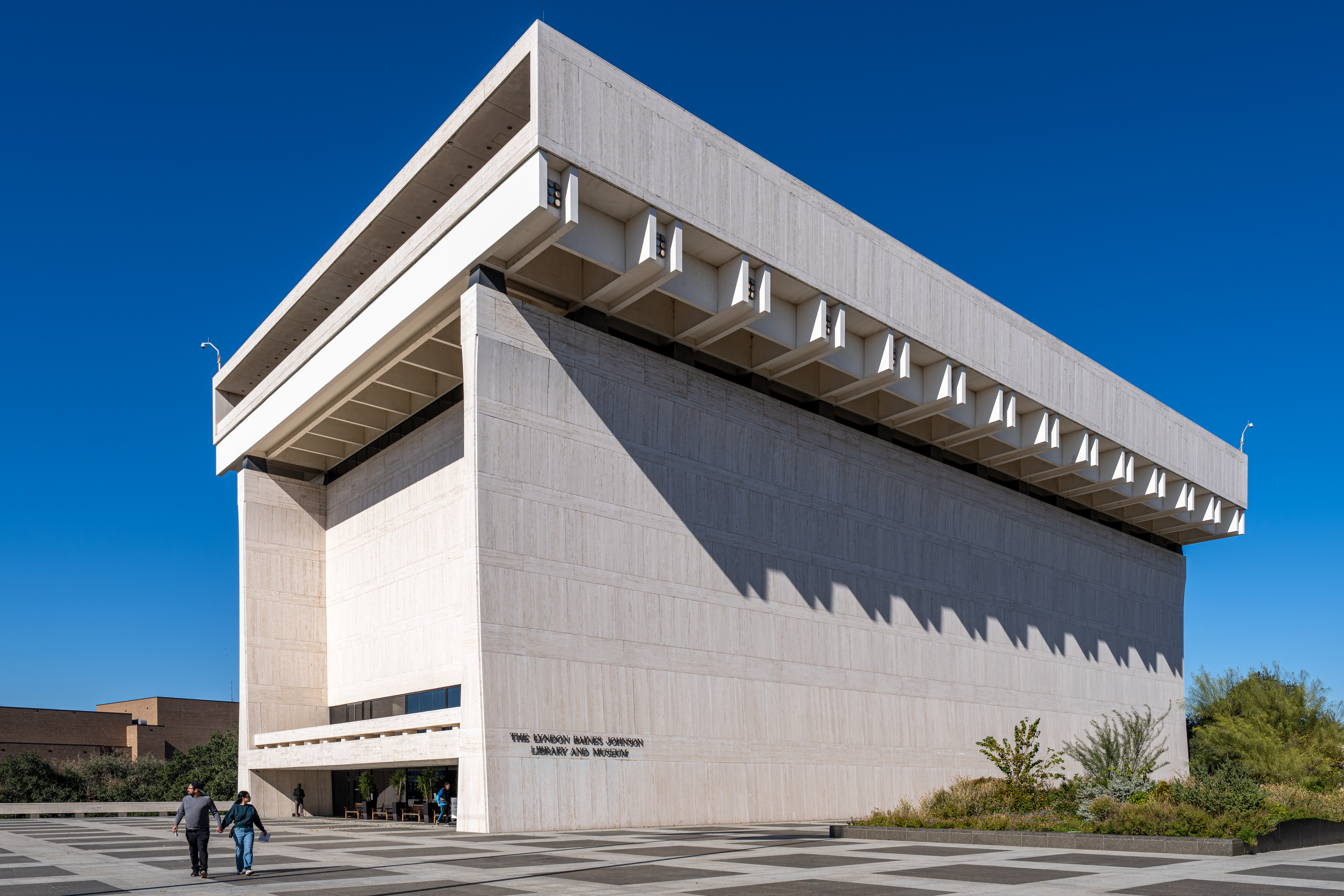
The LBJ Presidential Library at the University of Texas at Austin (UT) in 2025.

In 1976, Jimmy Carter became the last Democratic presidential candidate to carry Texas, and the tide was clearly turning when Democrats lost the gubernatorial election of 1978. Bill Clements was the first Republican governor since Reconstruction. By the 1990s Republicans had gained a strong foothold in the state, and throughout the 21st century they have been largely victorious. Currently, both houses of the Texas Legislature feature Republican majorities.

In 2018, Democratic U.S. Representative Beto O'Rourke lost his Senate bid to the incumbent Republican Ted Cruz by about 200,000 votes, a significant gain for Democrats in the state. O'Rourke's performance in the 2018 Senate race has shaken the notion of Republican dominance in Texas, with analysts predicting greater gains for the Democrats going into the 2020s.

Since the passage of the Affordable Care Act, Texas Democrats have prioritized advocating Medicaid expansion in the state, a policy that would provide a federally subsidized healthcare plan to approximately one million Texans. Another priority for Texas Democrats in the 2010s and 2020s has been increasing the minimum wage.

== Activities ==
Governor Ann Richards delivering a commencement speech at the University of Houston in May 1992.

The Texas Democratic Party is the primary organization responsible for increasing the representation of its ideological base in state, district, county, and city government. Its permanent staff provides training and resources for Democratic candidates within the state, particularly on grassroots organization and fundraising. The Party organization monitors political discourse in the state and speaks on behalf of its members. The party employs a full-time Communications Director who is responsible for the organization's communications strategy, which includes speaking with established state and national media. Press releases regarding current issues are often released through the by permanent staff. The party also maintains a website with updates and policy briefs on issues pertinent to its ideological base. Its online presence also includes Facebook, Instagram, and Twitter accounts, each of which has thousands of followers and is used to update followers on the most recent events affecting the party. The Party also oversees several e-mail and text messaging groups that send periodic updates to millions of followers.

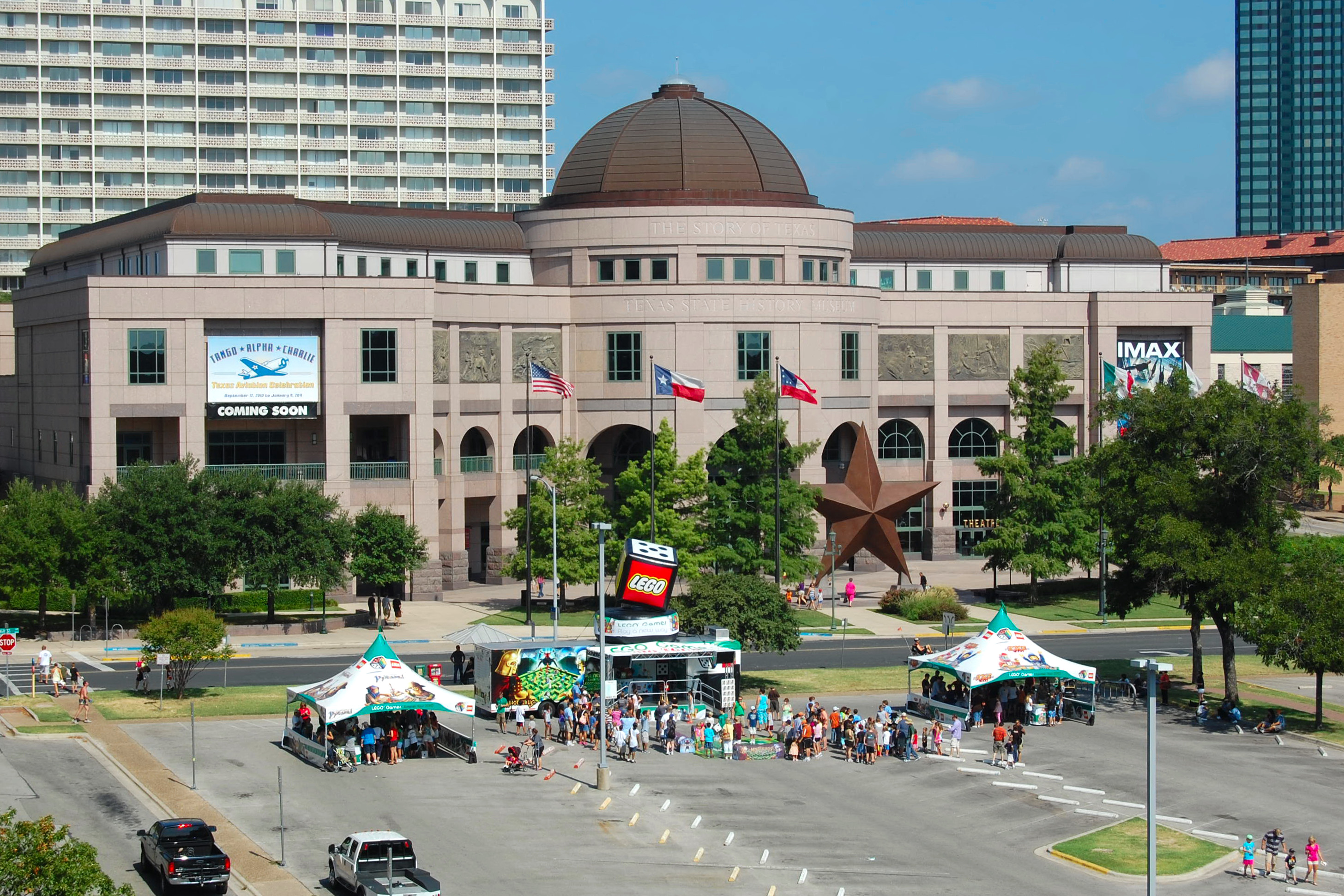
The Texas State History Museum in Austin, Texas is named after former Democratic Texas Lieutenant Governor Bob Bullock, who served under the administrations of Ann Richards and George W. Bush from 1991 to 1999.

A major function of the Texas Democratic Party is to raise funds to maintain the electoral infrastructure within its organization. Funds are used to provide for a permanent staff, publish communication and election material, provide training to candidates, and to pay for legal services.

The organization hosts biennial conventions that take place at precinct, county, and state level. The purpose of the precinct convention is to choose delegates to the county convention, and the delegates who gather at the county conventions are mainly concerned with selecting delegates to the state convention. The purpose of the state convention is to appoint the state executive committee, adopt a party platform, and officially certify the party's candidates to be listed on the general election ballot. The State Democratic Executive Committee (SDEC) includes one Committeeman and one Committeewoman from each of the 31 districts, plus a chairman and a vice-chairman. The SDEC members are elected by the convention's delegates. In presidential election years, the state convention also chooses delegates to go to the Democratic National Convention. Delegates also elect a state party chair. At the 2012 Texas Democratic Party Convention in Houston, delegates elected Gilberto Hinojosa as the new chair of the state party. Hinojosa is a former school board trustee, district judge, and county judge from Cameron County. Hinojosa replaced retiring chair Boyd Richie, who had been chair since April 22, 2006.

The State Democratic Executive Committee adopted the 2020 Delegate Selection Plan for submission to the Rules and Bylaws Committee of the Democratic National Committee. Texas sends the second largest delegation to the Democratic National Convention. Texas’ delegation is 281 persons, 262 delegates and 19 alternates. The delegates selected are in three categories: 149 District-Level delegates selected by attendees at the state convention by senate district caucuses of the supporters of each candidate who wins delegates. A candidate must have won at least 15% of the vote in the senate district to win district delegates. While looking at the statewide votes, the Texas Democratic Party also examines how each candidate performed in each of the 31 state senate districts. The same rule applies that a candidate must have won at least 15% of the vote in the senate district to win district delegates.

On December 2, 2023 the Texas Democratic Party was "the first among all states" to call for a ceasefire in Gaza.

== Current elected officials ==
The Texas Democratic Party holds 13 of the state's 38 U.S. House seats, 12 of the state's 31 Texas Senate seats, and 64 of the state's 150 Texas House of Representatives seats.

=== Members of Congress ===
==== U.S. Senate ====
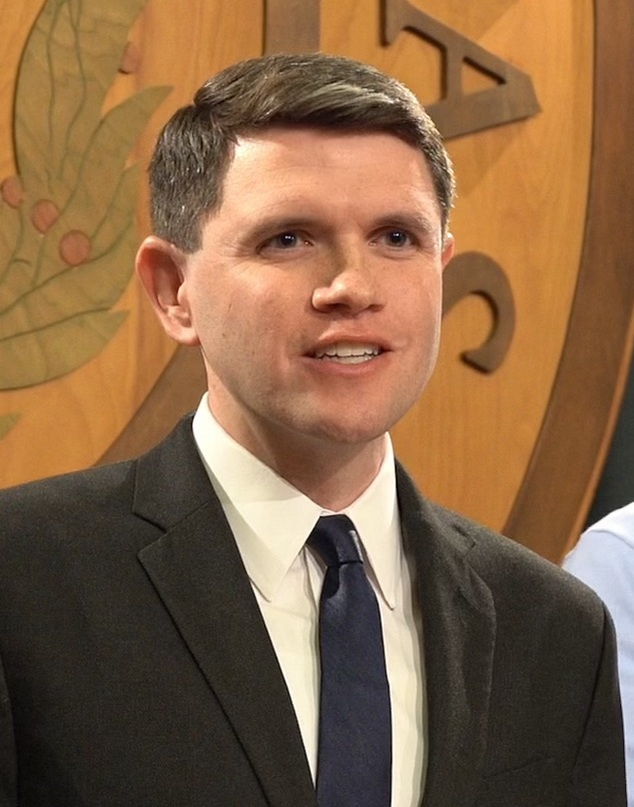
U.S. Senator-elect James Talarico

Both of Texas's U.S. Senate seats were held for 33 years by Republicans since 1993. Bob Krueger was the last Democrat to represent Texas in the U.S. Senate. Appointed in January 1993 by then Governor Ann Richards to fill the vacancy left by Lloyd Bentsen after Bentsen's appointment as the U.S. Secretary of the Treasury, Krueger lost his bid to finish the term in the subsequent 1993 special election to Republican challenger Kay Bailey Hutchison. Lloyd Bentsen was the last Democrat to represent Texas for a full term in the U.S. Senate from 1983 to 1989.

In the 2026 Senate race, James Talarico became the first Democrat to win a Senate election in Texas since Lloyd Bentsen's victory in 1988.

==== U.S. House of Representatives ====
As of February 2026, out of the 38 seats Texas is apportioned in the U.S. House of Representatives, 13 are held by Democrats:

District	Member	Photo
7th	Lizzie Fletcher	
9th	Al Green	
9th	Leticia Gutierrez (elect)	
15th	Bobby Pulido (elect)	
16th	Veronica Escobar	
18th	Christian Menefee	
20th	Joaquin Castro	
23rd	Katy Padilla Stout (elect)	
28th	Henry Cuellar	
29th	Sylvia Garcia	
30th	Jasmine Crockett	
30th	Frederick Haynes III (elect)	
33rd	Marc Veasey	
33rd	Colin Allred (elect)	
34th	Vicente Gonzalez	
35th	Johnny Garcia (elect)	
37th	Lloyd Doggett	
35th → 37th	Greg Casar	

=== Statewide offices ===
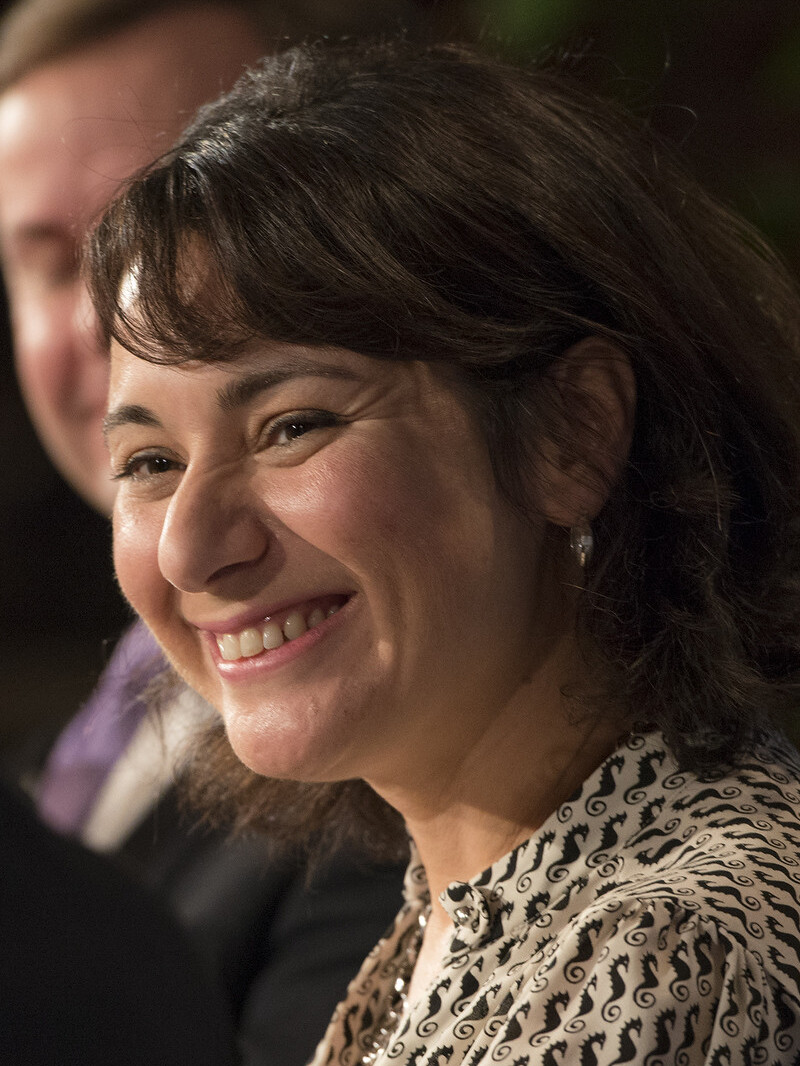
Governor-elect Gina Hinojosa

Lieutenant Governor-elect Vikki Goodwin

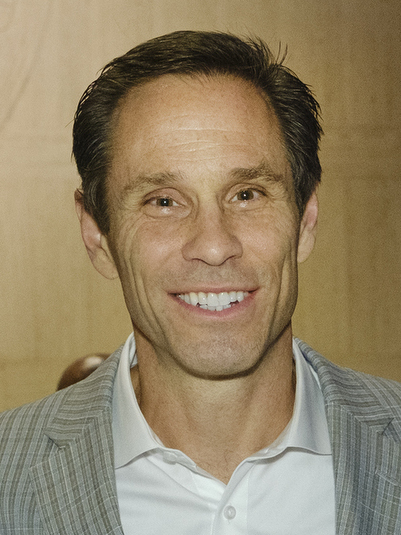
Attorney General-elect Nathan M. Johnson

Comptroller-elect Sarah Eckhardt

Land Commissioner-elect Benjamin Flores

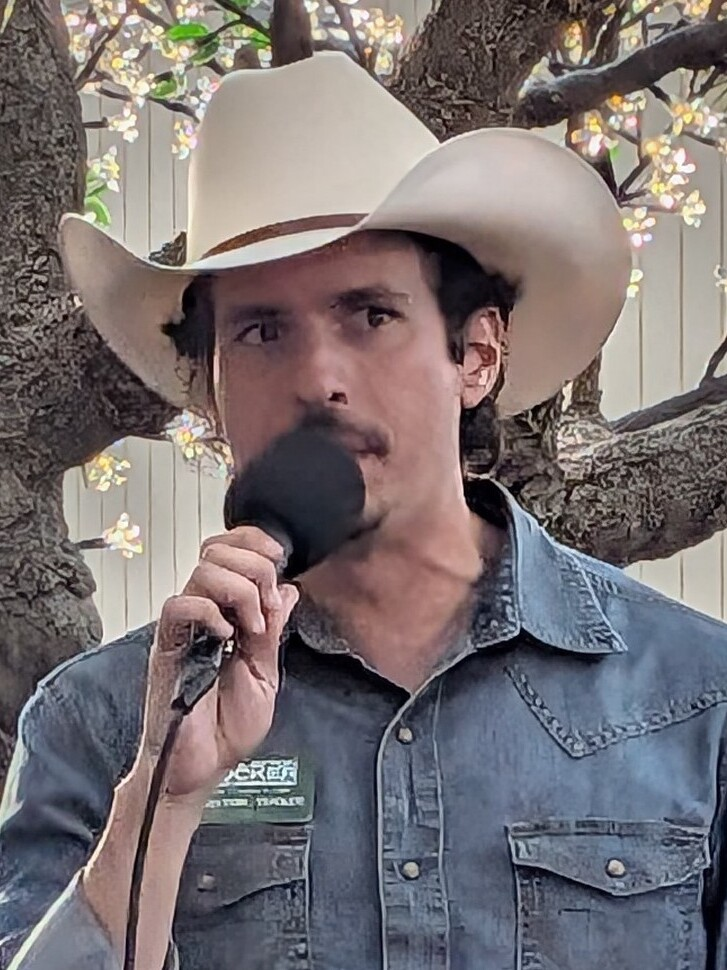
Agriculture Commissioner-elect Clayton Tucker

Texas had not elected any Democratic candidates to statewide office since 1994, when Bob Bullock, Dan Morales, John Sharp, and Garry Mauro were re-elected as lieutenant governor, attorney general, comptroller, and land commissioner, respectively. In 1998, Bullock and Morales both opted to retire instead of seeking third terms while Mauro and Sharp unsuccessfully ran for governor and lieutenant governor, losing to Republican challengers George W. Bush and Rick Perry.

Following the 2026 elections, Democrats swept all statewide elected offices.

=== Legislative leadership ===
- Senate Minority Leader: Carol Alvarado
- Speaker Pro Tempore of the House: Joe Moody
- House Minority Leader and Caucus Chair: Gene Wu

=== Party officers ===
The current Texas Democratic Party chair is Kendall Scudder, elected in 2025 following the resignation of Gilberto Hinojosa.

- Chairman: Kendall Scudder
- Vice Chair: Shay Wyrick Cathey
- Treasurer: Michael Apodaca
- Vice Chair of Finance: Daniel Ayala
- Secretary: Myra Mills Tschirhart
- Sergeant at Arms: Donna Beth McCormick
- Parliamentarian: Deana Tollerton
- Parliamentarian: George Nassar

==== Texas Senate ====
As of February 2026, there are 12 Democrats serving in the Texas Senate.

- Carol Alvarado, District 6
- Taylor Rehmet, District 9
- Borris Miles, District 13
- Sarah Eckhardt, District 14
- Molly Cook, District 15
- Nathan Johnson, District 16
- Roland Gutierrez, District 19
- Juan "Chuy" Hinojosa, District 20
- Judith Zaffirini, District 21
- Royce West, District 23
- Jose Menendez, District 26
- Cesar Blanco, District 29

==== Texas House of Representatives ====
As of July 2025, there are 62 Democrats serving in the Texas House of Representatives.

- Christian Manuel, District 22
- Ron Reynolds, District 27
- Oscar Longoria, District 35
- Sergio Muñoz, District 36
- Erin Gamez, District 38
- Armando Martinez, District 39
- Terry Canales, District 40
- Robert Guerra, District 41
- Richard Raymond, District 42
- Erin Zwiener, District 45
- Sheryl Cole, District 46
- Vikki Goodwin, District 47
- Donna Howard, District 48
- Gina Hinojosa, District 49
- James Talarico, District 50
- Maria Luisa "Lulu" Flores, District 51
- Mihaela Plesa, District 70
- Eddie Morales, Jr., District 74
- Mary Gonzalez, District 75
- Suleman Lalani, District 76
- Vincent Perez, District 77
- Joe Moody, District 78
- Claudia Ordaz, District 79
- Ramon Romero Jr., District 90
- Salman Bhojani, District 92
- Nicole Collier, District 95
- Venton Jones, District 100
- Chris Turner, District 101
- Ana-Maria Ramos, District 102
- Rafael Anchia, District 103
- Jessica González, District 104
- Terry Meza, District 105
- Linda Garcia, District 107
- Aicha Davis, District 109
- Toni Rose, District 110
- Yvonne Davis, District 111
- Rhetta Bowers, District 113
- John Bryant, District 114
- Cassandra Hernandez, District 115
- Trey Martinez Fischer, District 116
- Philip Cortez, District 117
- Elizabeth Campos, District 119
- Barbara Gervin-Hawkins, District 120
- Diego Bernal, District 123
- Josey Garcia, District 124
- Ray Lopez, District 125
- Alma Allen, District 131
- Ann Johnson, District 134
- Jon E. Rosenthal, District 135
- John Bucy III, District 136
- Gene Wu, District 137
- Charlene Ward Johnson, District 139
- Armando Walle, District 140
- Senfronia Thompson, District 141
- Harold Dutton Jr., District 142
- Ana Hernandez, District 143
- Mary Ann Perez, District 144
- Christina Morales, District 145
- Lauren Ashley Simmons, District 146
- Jolanda Jones, District 147
- Penny Morales Shaw, District 148
- Hubert Vo, District 149

==== State Board of Education ====
The following members of the State Board of Education are Democrats; they help oversee the Texas Education Agency:

- Gustalvo Reyes, District 1
- Marisa Perez, District 3
- Staci Childs, District 4
- Rebecca Bell-Metereau, District 5
- Tiffany Clark, District 13

=== County Judges (County Executives) ===
- Harris: Lina Hidalgo (1) → Letitia Plummer (elect)
- Dallas: Clay Jenkins (2)
- Tarrant: Alisa Simmons (elect) (3)
- Bexar: Peter Sakai (4) → Ron Nirenberg (elect)
- Travis: Andy Brown (5)
- Fort Bend: Dexter McCoy (elect) (8)
- Hidalgo: Richard Cortez (9)
- El Paso: Ricardo Samaniego (10)
- Williamson: Heather Jefts (elect) (12)
- Cameron: Eddie Treviño (13)
- Hays: Ruben Becerra (19)
- Val Verde: Lewis G. Owens
- Presidio: Jose Portillo Jr
- Loving: Skeet Lee Jones (254)

=== Mayoral offices ===
Some of the state's major cities have Democratic mayors. As of November 11, 2026, Democrats control the mayor's offices in four of Texas's ten largest cities:

- Houston (1): John Whitmire
- San Antonio (2): Gina Ortiz Jones
- Austin (5): Kirk Watson
- El Paso (6): Renard Johnson

== Election results ==
=== Federal ===
==== U.S. Senate ====
Class 1
Year	Candidate	Votes	%	Result
1970	Lloyd Bentsen	1,194,069	53.55%	Won ✓
1976	Lloyd Bentsen	2,199,956	56.78%	Won ✓
1982	Lloyd Bentsen	1,818,223	58.59%	Won ✓
1988	Lloyd Bentsen	3,149,806	59.71%	Won ✓
1993	Bob Krueger	576,538	32.66%	Lost ✗
1994	Richard W. Fisher	1,639,615	37.31%	Lost ✗
2000	Gene Kelly	2,025,024	32.31%	Lost ✗
2006	Barbara Ann Radnofsky	1,555,202	36.04%	Lost ✗
2012	Paul Sadler	3,194,927	44.71%	Lost ✗
2018	Beto O'Rourke	4,045,632	48.33%	Lost ✗
2024	Colin Allred	5,031,249	44.56%	Lost ✗

Class 2
Year	Candidate	Votes	%	Result
1972	Barefoot Sanders	1,511,985	44.30%	Lost ✗
1978	Bob Krueger	1,139,149	49.26%	Lost ✗
1984	Lloyd Doggett	2,202,557	41.45%	Lost ✗
1990	Hugh Parmer	1,429,986	37.41%	Lost ✗
1996	Victor Morales	2,428,776	43.94%	Lost ✗
2002	Ron Kirk	1,955,758	43.33%	Lost ✗
2008	Rick Noriega	3,389,365	42.84%	Lost ✗
2014	David Alameel	1,597,387	34.36%	Lost ✗
2020	M. J. Hegar	4,889,384	43.87%	Lost ✗
2026	James Talarico	5,447,080	55.09%	Won ✓

==== U.S. House ====
Election	Votes	%	Seats (TX)	±	%
2016	3,160,535	37.06	11 / 37	0	3.96
2018	3,852,752	46.97	13 / 37	▲2	9.9
2020	4,896,383	44.14	13 / 37	0	2.86
2022	3,004,053	38.73	13 / 38	▲1	3.13
2024	4,311,123	40.39	13 / 38	0	1.66
2026	5,145,910	52.62	14 / 38	▲1	12.33

=== State ===
==== Executive offices ====
Governor
Election	Candidate	Votes	%	Result
1962	John Connally	847,038	54.0%	Won ✓
1964	John Connally	1,877,793	73.8%	Won ✓
1966	John Connally	1,037,517	72.8%	Won ✓
1968	Preston Smith	1,662,019	57.0%	Won ✓
1970	Preston Smith	1,232,506	53.4%	Won ✓
1972	Dolph Briscoe	1,633,493	47.9%	Won ✓
1974	Dolph Briscoe	1,016,334	61.4%	Won ✓
1978	John Hill	1,166,919	39.68%	Lost ✗
1982	Mark White	1,697,870	53.20%	Won ✓
1986	Mark White	1,584,515	46.04%	Lost ✗
1990	Ann Richards	1,925,670	49.47%	Won ✓
1994	Ann Richards	2,016,928	46.88%	Lost ✗
1998	Garry Mauro	1,165,592	31.18%	Lost ✗
2002	Tony Sanchez Jr.	1,819,798	38.96%	Lost ✗
2006	Chris Bell	1,310,353	43.92%	Lost ✗
2010	Bill White	2,106,395	42.30%	Lost ✗
2014	Wendy Davis	1,835,596	38.90%	Lost ✗
2018	Lupe Valdez	3,546,615	42.51%	Lost ✗
2022	Beto O'Rourke	3,553,656	43.86%	Lost ✗
2026	Gina Hinojosa	5,232,679	52.82%	Won ✓

Lieutenant Governor
Election	Candidate	Votes	%	Result
2014	Leticia Van de Putte	1,810,720	38.7%	Lost ✗
2018	Mike Collier	3,860,865	46.5%	Lost ✗
2022	Mike Collier	3,492,544	43.48%	Lost ✗
2026	Vikki Goodwin	5,083,719	51.7%	Won ✓

Attorney General
Election	Candidate	Votes	%	Result
2014	Sam Houston	1,773,108	38.02%	Lost ✗
2018	Justin Nelson	3,898,098	47.01%	Lost ✗
2022	Rochelle Mercedes Garza	3,497,267	43.66%	Lost ✗
2026	Nathan M. Johnson	5,133,762	52.4%	Won ✓
