= Gilberto Hinojosa =

American politician (born 1952)

Chair of the Texas Democratic Party
- In office June 9, 2012 – March 29, 2025
- Preceded by: Boyd Richie
- Succeeded by: Kendall Scudder

County Judge of Cameron County
- In office January 1, 1995 – January 1, 2007
- Preceded by: Tony Garza
- Succeeded by: Carlos Cascos

Personal details
- Born: July 8, 1952 (age 74) Alamo, Texas, U.S.
- Party: Democratic
- Children: 2, including Gina
- Education: University of Texas, Pan American (BA); Georgetown University (JD)

Gilberto Hinojosa (/inəˈhoʊsə/; EEN-ə-HOH-sə; born July 8, 1952) is an American politician. A member of the Democratic Party, he served as chair of the Texas Democratic Party from 2012 to 2025. He was previously the county judge of Cameron County, Texas from 1995 to 2006. He is the father of Governor-elect Gina Hinojosa.

== Early career ==
While living in Washington D.C., Hinojosa worked as a staff attorney for the Migrant Legal Action Program, Inc. He later became the director of the Migrant Division of Colorado Rural Legal Services, Inc., in Denver, Colorado. After returning to his native Texas, he continued to practice law as the managing attorney for Texas Rural Legal Aid, Inc., in Brownsville. Although he briefly was a partner with another law firm in 1995 he established his law firm of Magallanes & Hinojosa, P.C., in Brownsville.

== County judge ==
Hinojosa was elected Cameron County Judge on November 8, 1994. During his administration, bridges from Texas to Mexico were built and the restoration of the 1912 era courthouse was completed. The Dancy Building houses the county administration.

On August 11, 2003, Hinojosa appeared before the United States Senate Committee on Environment and Public Works in support of Senate Bill 1329, which would provide funds to assist in moving railroads to improve access for commercial traffic which passes through Cameron County to and from the border with Mexico. He voiced support for the planned Interstate 69 project. After the bill passed, the Cameron County West Rail Relocation Project was initiated providing for the construction of a railroad across the Rio Grande River from Brownsville to Matamoros, Mexico, with approximately $21 million in federal funds provided. The administration of Judge Carlos Cascos continues to work towards completing the project.

== County Democratic Chairman ==
Hinojosa was elected chairman of the Cameron County Democratic Party on November 12, 2007.

On January 21, 2009, the day following the first inauguration of Barack Obama, Hinojosa attended the Democratic National Committee winter meeting in Washington, D.C., which included the 2009 Democratic National Committee chairmanship election. During this official nomination process, he seconded Tim Kaine's nomination and delivered a speech in support. Ultimately, Kaine was elected chairman via acclamation and unanimous vote.

== Texas Democratic Party Chairmanship ==
On May 12, 2011, Hinojosa announced his intention to run for chair of the Texas Democratic Party after the incumbent, Boyd Richie, announced that he would not run for re-election and was retiring. Hinojosa named Houston attorney Cris Felman treasurer of his campaign. Hinojosa was elected chair of the Texas Democratic Party on June 9, 2012, at the state party convention held in Houston. He replaced Richie.

On November 8, 2024, Hinojosa announced his resignation as Texas Democratic Party chair, effective in March 2025.

== Personal life ==
Hinojosa is the father of Xochitl Hinojosa, the spokesperson for the 2020 Democratic National Convention, and Gina Hinojosa, Democratic member of the Texas House of Representatives and the governor-elect of Texas, having defeated incumbent governor Greg Abbott in the 2026 Texas gubernatorial election. He is of Mexican descent.

Party political offices
| Preceded by Boyd Richie | Chair of the Texas Democratic Party; 2012–2025 | Succeeded by Kendall Scudder |
