= Robert Miklos =

American politician

Member of the Texas House of Representatives from the 101st district
- In office January 2009 – January 2011
- Succeeded by: Cindy Burkett

Personal details
- Born: November 6, 1965 (age 60) Mesquite, Texas, U.S.
- Party: Democratic
- Education: University of Texas at Austin (BA); University of Houston (JD)

Robert Miklos is an American attorney and politician who sat in the Texas house of representatives, representing the 101st district, from 2009 to 2011.

== Early life and education ==
Miklos was born on November 6, 1965, in Murray, Utah. He earned a Bachelor of Arts in history from the University of Texas at Austin and Juris Doctor from the University of Houston Law Center.

== Career ==
Before election to the house, Miklos worked as a prosecutor. He assumed office in 2009 and sat for one term. He was defeated for re-election by the Republican, Cindy Burkett. In 2017, he was elected to the Mesquite City Council.
