= Bob Richardson (politician) =

American politician (1945–2017)

Member of the Texas House of Representatives from the 49th district
- In office January 8, 1985 – January 8, 1991
- Preceded by: Russ Tidwell
- Succeeded by: Elliott Naishtat

Personal details
- Born: June 14, 1945
- Died: October 23, 2017 (aged 72)
- Party: Republican
- Spouse: Kathy
- Children: 2
- Education: Vanderbilt University (BA); University of Texas School of Law (JD)
- Occupation: Attorney; reporter

Bob Richardson (June 14, 1945 – October 23, 2017) was an American politician and attorney. He was a Republican member of the Texas House of Representatives for the 49th district from 1985 to 1991.

Prior to becoming a state legislator, Richardson served as an anchor for KTBC during the time he was in law school. Richardson eventually practiced law for over 25 years, including as a prosecutor.

== Texas House of Representatives ==
During Richardson's time in the Texas House of Representatives, he served in the 69th, 70th, and 71st sessions. He successfully amended the Texas Constitution to include a Crime Victim's Bill of Rights.

== Death ==
Richardson died on October 23, 2017, at the age of 72. He was buried at the Texas State Cemetery on October 27.

Texas House of Representatives
| Preceded by Russ Tidwell | Texas State Representative for District 49 (Travis County); 1985 - 1991 | Succeeded by Elliott Naishtat |
