= Texas's 48th House of Representatives district =

American legislative district

Texas's 48th State House of Representatives district
Representative
Donna Howard; D–Austin
- Demographics: 60.2% White; 5.1% Black; 24.6% Hispanic; 8.6% Asian
- Population (2020) • Voting age: 202,586; 161,721

The 48th district of the Texas House of Representatives consists of central and southern portions of Travis County. The current representative is Donna Howard, who has represented the district since 2006.

Following the 2021 redistricting, the district includes much of central and southern parts of the city of Austin, the capital of the state of Texas. The small cities of Rollingwood and West Lake Hills are also located inside the district.

The district contains a portion of major highway I-35 in its southern portion, and borders Texas House district 49 to its east.
