= Donna Howard =

American politician (born 1951)

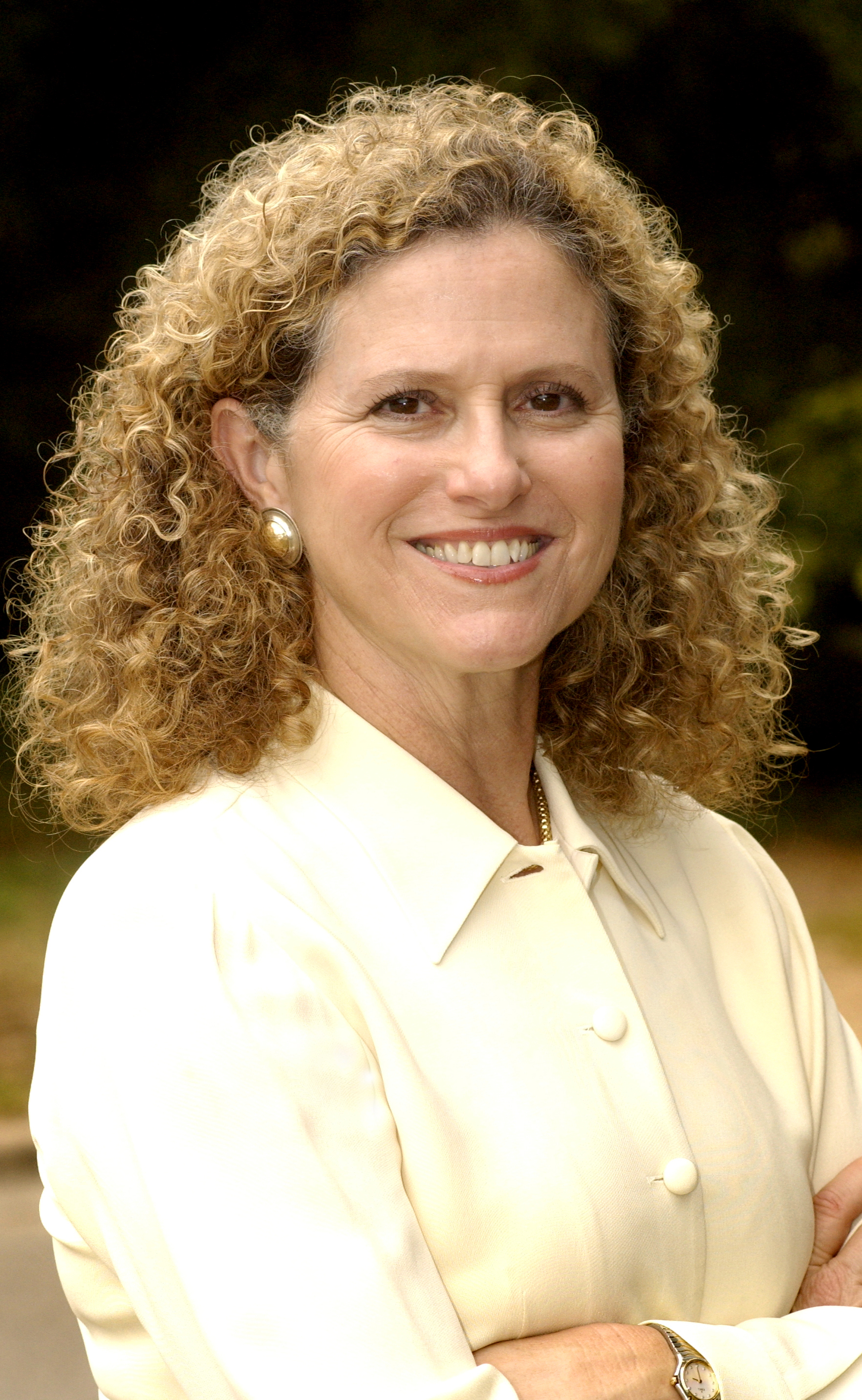
- Howard in 2005

Chair of the Texas House Women's Health Caucus
- Incumbent
- Assumed office January 24, 2020
- Preceded by: Jessica Farrar

Member of the Texas House of Representatives from the 48th district
- Incumbent
- Assumed office March 2, 2006
- Preceded by: Todd Baxter

Personal details
- Born: October 25, 1951 (age 75) Austin, Texas, U.S.
- Party: Democratic
- Spouse: Derek Howard
- Education: University of Texas at Austin (BA, MA)
- Profession: Community advocate Critical care nurse
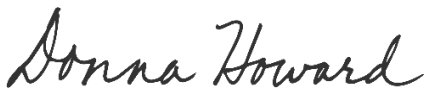
- Signature
- Website: Office website Campaign website

Donna Smelser Howard (born October 25, 1951) is a Democratic member of the Texas House of Representatives, representing the 48th District since her election in 2006. She currently serves as vice chair of the House Administration Committee and also serves on the Appropriations Committee, the Higher Education Committee, and the Appropriations Sub-Committees on Article III and on Budget Transparency and Reform.

== Early life, education, and early career ==
Howard was born in Austin, Texas. She graduated from Reagan High School in Austin before moving on to the University of Texas at Austin, where she earned a B.A. in Nursing in 1974 and an M.A. in Health Administration in 1977.

Howard worked as a critical-care nurse at Brackenrige Hospital and Seton Hospital in Austin. While at Seton, she helped start the Good Health program and served as District 5 President of the Texas Nurse's Association. Howard also served on the University of Texas faculty as a Health Education instructor.

== Political career ==
From 1996 to 1999, Howard served on the Eanes Independent School District school board.

On February 14, 2006, Howard defeated Republican Ben Bentzin in a special election runoff to replace Todd Baxter.

In the 2006 general election, Howard was again to face Bentzin, but Bentzin ultimately withdrew from the race, which Howard won by a wide margin.

Howard retained her seat in 2008, defeating Republican Pamela Waggoner.

In 2009, the Texas Association of Deans and Directors of Professional Nursing Programs honored Howard with its Champion for Nursing Education Award.

In 2010, Howard narrowly defeated former Texas Longhorn and Denver Broncos player Dan Neil. On election day, the Secretary of State of Texas certified Howard as the winner by 16 votes. Following a recount requested by Neil, the Secretary of State found Howard to still be the winner, though by only 12 votes. Neil then requested that the election be investigated by the House of Representatives. After a four-day hearing headed up by Representative Will Hartnett, Howard was found to have won the election by 4 votes and Neil ultimately dropped the contest. The Secretary of State still reports an official margin of 12 votes. Even with the 12 vote victory that the Secretary of State considers official, it is the closest Texas House race on record.

In 2011, Howard was the recipient of the 2011 Dr. Dorothy J. Lovett Distinguished Alumni Award from the University of Texas School of Nursing and was inducted in the University of Texas College of Education Hall of Honor.

In 2019, Howard authored H.B. 1590, which created a Sexual Assault Survivors Task Force in the Governor's Office to collect information on agencies' responses to sexual assaults and develop best practices. The bill passed unanimously in the House and Senate and was signed by the Governor. The Task Force began meeting on February 6, 2020, and is due to deliver a series of reports to the Texas Legislature on November 1, 2020.

Texas Monthly named Howard a Best Lawmaker in June 2019 for her work during Texas' 86th Legislative session.

Donna Howard is an atheist and in 2025, offered an atheist invocation to 'God of many names'.

== Electoral history ==
Election history of Howard.

=== 2022 ===
Texas House of Representatives 48th district, 2022
Party	Candidate	Votes	%
Democratic	Donna Howard (Incumbent)	64,039	79.6
Libertarian	Daniel Jerome Mccarthy	16,439	20.4
Majority		47,600	59.1
Turnout		80,478	54.6
Democratic hold			

=== 2020 ===
Texas House of Representatives 48th district, 2020
Party	Candidate	Votes	%
Democratic	Donna Howard (Incumbent)	73,590	70.1
Republican	Bill Strieber	31,382	29.9
Majority		42,208	40.2
Turnout		104,972	71.6
Democratic hold			

=== 2018 ===
Texas House of Representatives 48th district, 2018
Party	Candidate	Votes	%
Democratic	Donna Howard (Incumbent)	67,952	100.0
Majority		67,952	100.0
Turnout		67,952	8.8
Democratic hold			

=== 2016 ===
Texas House of Representatives 48th district, 2016
Party	Candidate	Votes	%
Democratic	Donna Howard (Incumbent)	60,512	79.4
Libertarian	Ben Easton	15,702	20.6
Majority		44,810	58.8
Turnout		76,214	10.5
Democratic hold			

=== 2014 ===
Texas House of Representatives 48th district, 2014
Party	Candidate	Votes	%
Democratic	Donna Howard (Incumbent)	39,668	78.1
Libertarian	Ben Easton	11,126	21.9
Majority		28,542	56.2
Turnout		50,794	
Democratic hold			

=== 2012 ===
Texas House of Representatives 48th district, 2012
Party	Candidate	Votes	%
Democratic	Donna Howard (Incumbent)	46,512	59.2
Republican	Robert Thomas	27,922	35.5
Libertarian	Joe Edgar	4,134	5.3
Majority		18,590	23.7
Turnout		78,568	
Democratic hold			

=== 2010 ===
Texas House of Representatives 48th district, 2010
Party	Candidate	Votes	%
Democratic	Donna Howard (Incumbent)	25,023	48.54
Republican	Dan Neil	25,011	48.52
Libertarian	Ben Easton	1,519	2.9
Majority		12	0.02
Turnout		51,553	
Democratic hold			

=== 2008 ===
Texas House of Representatives 48th district, 2008
Party	Candidate	Votes	%
Democratic	Donna Howard (Incumbent)	39,748	53.7
Republican	Pamela Waggoner	31,028	42.0
Libertarian	Ben Easton	3,174	4.3
Majority		8,720	11.7
Turnout		73,950	
Democratic hold			

=== 2006 ===
Texas House of Representatives 48th district, 2006
Party	Candidate	Votes	%
Democratic	Donna Howard (Incumbent)	31,255	77.8
Libertarian	Ben Easton	8,939	22.2
Majority		22,316	55.6
Turnout		40,194	
Democratic hold			

Democratic primary for Texas's 48th district, 2006
Party	Candidate	Votes	%
Democratic	Donna Howard (Incumbent)	4,133	92.3
Democratic	Kathy Rider	229	5.1
Democratic	Andy Brown	114	2.5
Turnout		4,476	

Texas House of Representatives 48th district, 2006 special election runoff
Party	Candidate	Votes	%
Democratic	Donna Howard	12,620	57.6
Republican	Ben Bentzin (withdrawn)	9,284	42.4
Majority		3,336	15.2
Turnout		21,904	
Democratic gain from Republican			

Texas House of Representatives 48th district, 2006 special election
Party	Candidate	Votes	%
Democratic	Donna Howard	6,705	49.5
Republican	Ben Bentzin	5,125	37.8
Democratic	Kathy Rider	1,416	10.4
Libertarian	Ben Easton	310	2.3
Turnout		13,556	
