= Texas's 120th House of Representatives district =

American legislative district

Texas's 120th State House of Representatives district
Representative
Barbara Gervin-Hawkins; D–San Antonio
- Demographics: 20.4% White; 24.9% Black; 52.2% Hispanic; 3.9% Asian
- Population (2020) • Voting age: 200,262; 147,538

The 120th district of the Texas House of Representatives contains parts of eastern San Antonio. The district also includes parts of Kirby, Windcrest, and Converse. The current representative is Barbara Gervin-Hawkins, who was first elected in 2016.
