= Independent Living Council =

United States agency

Some states in the United States have a state-named Independent Living Council. While federal funding exists, each state's funding is allocated by the individual state's legislature. Although they can make recommendations, they have few to no powers regarding privately financed single-family homes. At times state Independent Living Councils are caught in a conflict of interest.

== States ==
- California State Independent Living Council:
- New Jersey State Independent Living Council:
- New York State Independent Living Council: Budget cuts in 2001, along with not spending some funds allocated, made obvious the impact felt by many vulnerable groups.
- Texas State Independent Living Council:
