= Texas's 49th House of Representatives district =

American legislative district

Texas's 49th State House of Representatives district
Representative
Gina Hinojosa; D–Austin
- Demographics: 57.1% White; 5.1% Black; 26.6% Hispanic; 9.7% Asian
- Population (2020) • Voting age: 203,558; 174,979

The Texas House of Representatives 49th district includes a central portion of Travis County. Governor-elect Gina Hinojosa has represented the district since 2017.

Since the 2021 redistricting, the district includes much of central Austin, including the Texas State Capitol Building and part of Austin's Sixth Street entertainment and bar district. It also encompasses the small city of Sunset Valley.

Major highway I-35 acts as an eastern border for much of the district, separating it from Texas House district 46.

== List of representatives ==
Elliott Naishtat, 1991-2017

Gina Hinojosa, 2017-2027

Montserrat Garibay, 2027–
