= Pocket Points =

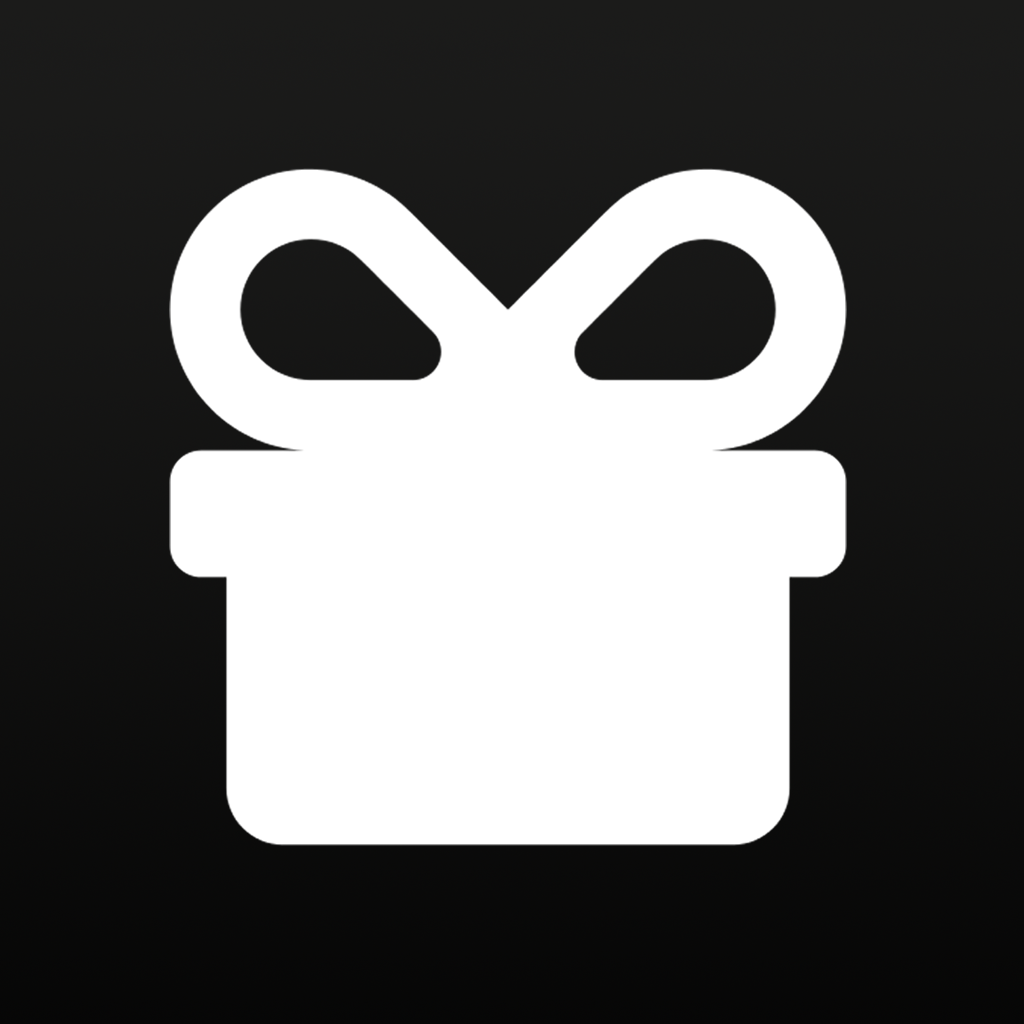
- Headquarters: Chico, California
- Founders: Rob Richardson; Mitch Gardner
- CEO: Rob Richardson
- Industry: Internet
- Employees: 15-50
- Website: pocketpoints.com
- Launched: Fall 2014
- Current status: Inactive
- Native client on: Android

Pocket Points was a mobile app that was developed in 2014 by Mitch Gardner and Rob Richardson. Both were California State University, Chico students and members of Sigma Chi fraternity. The mobile app gives students rewards for not using their phones during class. Students open up the app, lock their phones, and start accumulating points. Points are then used to get discounts at local and online businesses.

== History ==
Richardson realized the problem of smartphone abuse in classrooms as he was sitting in the back of a large lecture. The initial idea was to have professors reward their students with extra credit for not using their phones. After performing a number of focus groups they received negative feedback from professors. They found that professors did want their students more engaged, but didn't want the additional responsibility of monitoring their phone use. After doing research on student incentives, the two of them found that students were heavily motivated by food-related discounts. This led them to their current model: Rewarding students with discounted items at local businesses surrounding each campus.

The iOS version of app launched at California State University, Chico in September 2014. After an angel investment, the company expanded to an additional eleven schools in spring 2015. Some of these schools included California State Polytechnic University, San Luis Obispo and Pennsylvania State University. After securing seed funding, Pocket Points is available on both iOS and Android to students at over 200 schools in the United States and Canada.

== Features ==
The app uses geo-fence technology to know whether students are on or off campus. Students are only able to earn points if they are on campus in academic buildings. Points cannot be earned at the school gym or in dorm rooms. When students are on campus they open the app, lock their phones, and begin earning points. The longer their phones remain locked, the more points they earn. Students will earn roughly one point every twenty minutes, but the rate at which points are earned varies. The more students using the app on each specific campus, the faster points are earned. After accumulating enough points, students can choose from a variety of different discounts at local and online businesses from the app's "Gift Page." The "Gift Page" also includes a map where students can see the location of each participating local business. The app is also equipped with a "Leaderboard" where students can see who has earned the most points that day, week, etc.

== Demographic ==
The app's main demographic consists of college students between 17 and 23 years of age.
