= Gina Hinojosa =

Governor-elect of Texas (born 1973)

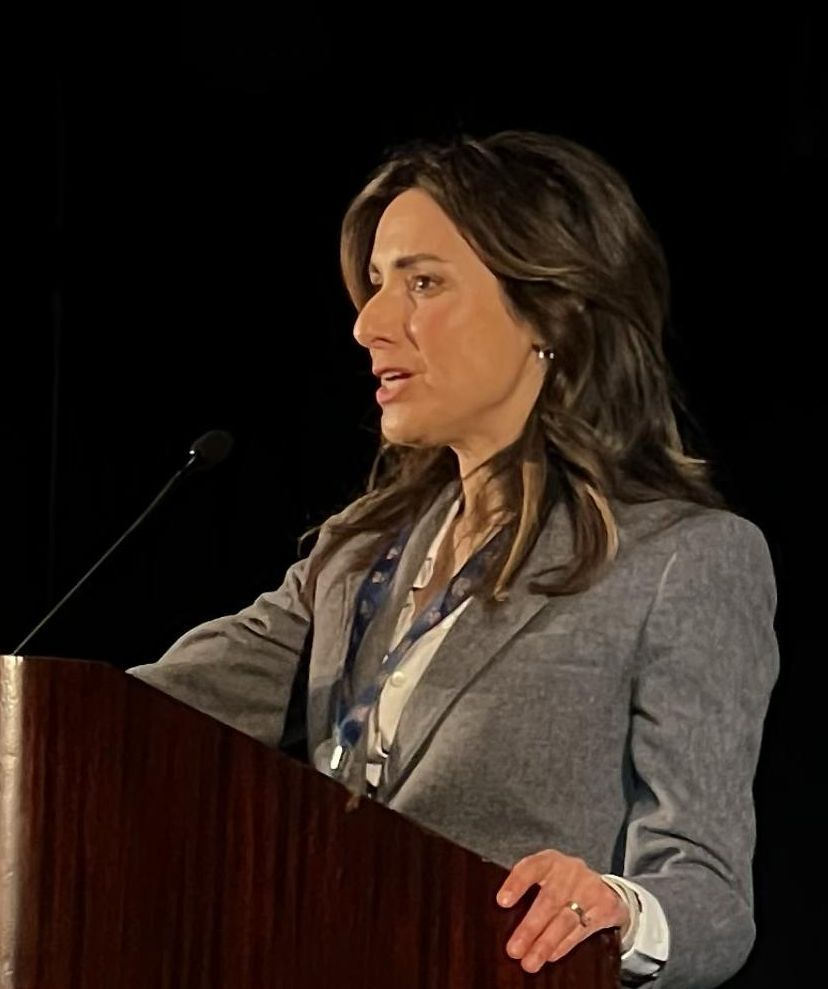
- Hinojosa in 2024

Governor-elect of Texas
- Assuming office January 19, 2027
- Lieutenant: Vikki Goodwin (elect)
- Succeeding: Greg Abbott

Member of the Texas House of Representatives from the 49th district
- Incumbent
- Assumed office January 10, 2017
- Preceded by: Elliott Naishtat

Personal details
- Born: Regina Inez Hinojosa; December 8, 1973 (age 52) McAllen, Texas, U.S.
- Party: Democratic
- Spouse: John Donisi
- Children: 2
- Parent: Gilberto Hinojosa (father)
- Education: University of Texas at Austin (BA); George Washington University (JD)
- Website: State House website; Campaign website

Regina Inez Hinojosa (Note: /ˌiːnəˈhoʊsə/ EE-nə-HOH-sə; Spanish: [inoˈxosa].) (born December 8, 1973) is an American politician and lawyer who is the governor-elect of Texas. A member of the Democratic Party, she has represented the 49th district in the Texas House of Representatives since 2017. Hinojosa was elected governor on November 3, 2026, and will be Texas's first Latina governor.

Born in McAllen, Texas, Hinojosa graduated from the University of Texas at Austin and George Washington University Law School. Before becoming a state legislator, she was a labor and civil rights lawyer. She worked for the American Federation of State, County and Municipal Employees and for the law firm of Kator, Parks & Weiser. In 2005, she was part of the legal team that sued U.S. House Majority Leader Tom DeLay on money laundering charges. She was also a member of the Austin Independent School District's school board and has worked part-time for Catholic Charities USA, Texas Rural Legal Aid, and the Equal Justice Center.

In the 2026 Texas gubernatorial election, Hinojosa defeated incumbent Republican governor Greg Abbott, becoming the first Democrat to be elected governor of Texas since Ann Richards in 1990. The result was widely seen as an upset. Her campaign focused on anti-corruption, healthcare, cost of living, public schools, and opposition to new AI data centers. She has advocated for legal protections for LGBTQ Texans and for restoring Roe v. Wade, but she deemphasized cultural issues in her 2026 campaign. She has criticized both Operation Lone Star and federal immigration enforcement in Texas, including practices such as child detention. Hinojosa is a longtime opponent of school vouchers, and supporter of public education.

== Early life, education, and career ==
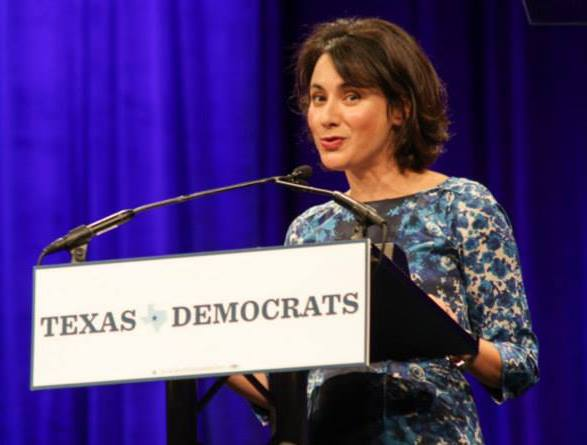
Hinojosa speaking at the Texas Democratic Party's 2014 convention

Regina Inez Hinojosa was born on December 8, 1973, in McAllen, Texas. She is the daughter of politician Gilberto Hinojosa, a former chair of the Texas Democratic Party, and Crisanta Guerra Lozano, a legal aid attorney. Both of her parents began their careers in legal aid for farmworkers. Hinojosa is of Mexican descent. Her mother was born in north-central Mexico, and is a naturalized U.S. citizen. Her father is a second-generation Mexican American.

Hinojosa grew up in Brownsville, a Texan border city. She spent summers with her grandparents in Mission. She graduated from Homer Hanna High School in Brownsville in 1992. When she graduated, Hinojosa predicted in her high school yearbook: "In ten years I will establish my career in a prominent law firm while strategizing my campaign for the next Texas gubernatorial elections after having Governor Ann Richards' endorsement." She obtained her Bachelor of Arts in Plan II Honors and Government from the University of Texas at Austin in 1996. She then earned a Juris Doctor from George Washington University Law School in 1999. She spent one semester at the University of Texas School of Law, where she met her husband.

Hinojosa started her career representing union members as a civil rights lawyer. In 2012, when Pease Elementary School, which her son attended, was under threat of closure, she ran for and was elected to the school board in the Austin Independent School District. She then worked to keep the campus open and ultimately succeeded. She served on the school board until her election to the Texas House of Representatives in 2016.

== Texas House of Representatives ==
=== 2017 ===
Hinojosa speaking at event in 2017

In the 85th Texas Legislature, Hinojosa proposed directing $3 million to the Texas Health and Human Services Commission to help trafficking victims receive necessary services. The proposal passed the House 113 to 32, but was stripped from the budget during negotiations with the Senate.

=== 2019 ===
At an organizing campaign for the Healthy Texas Act of 2019, Hinojosa pledged to introduce legislation to provide every Texas resident with comprehensive healthcare services. The bill was considered in committee, but did not move forward. During the 86th Texas Legislature, Hinojosa also authored HB 1307, which established a system allowing individuals impacted by disasters to apply for assistance. The bill was signed into law.

=== 2021 ===
During the 87th Texas Legislature, Hinojosa filed House Bill 73, which would have prohibited the use of the gay and trans panic defense. Under the panic defense, criminal penalties for assault and murder can be lessened or eliminated if the perpetrator claims they lost control and acted violently in response to the victim's sexual orientation or gender identity. The bill was rejected by the House Committee on Criminal Jurisprudence.

In July 2021, Democratic members of the Texas House, including Hinojosa, left the state in an effort to prevent the passage of voting restriction legislation, which would ban drive-thru and 24-hour voting, prohibit local election officials from distributing unrequested mail-in ballot applications, and grant partisan poll watchers unrestricted movement at voting sites, among other changes. Although the bill eventually passed, provisions that would have made it easier for judges to overturn election results and prohibited early morning voting on Sundays were eliminated.

=== 2023 ===
During the 88th Texas Legislature, Hinojosa authored the Fully Fund Our Future Act. The bill would have invested 40 billion dollars into the Texas public school system, providing teachers with a $15,000 raise and school support staff with a $5,500 raise, increasing per-student funding from $6,160 to $8,947, and allocating an additional $2 billion for special education services. However, Texas Governor Greg Abbott stated that he would not permit increasing public education funding or providing teacher pay raises unless school voucher legislation passed. As a result, public school districts did not receive additional state funding in 2023.

=== 2025 ===
In February 2025, Hinojosa posted a link to an interactive website where users could learn how much money local school districts would lose as a result of school voucher legislation. Governor Abbott, who had designated the passage of school vouchers as his first priority of the session, stated that Democrats either don't understand the legislation "or they lie about it." Hinojosa responded, "Call me a liar to my face," in a post accompanied by a video offering to educate the governor on school finance.

In August 2025, Hinojosa was one of the 51 Democratic members of the Texas House who left the state to participate in the quorum bust in order to delay the passage of new congressional maps. While she was absent from the state, Attorney General Ken Paxton filed a lawsuit to attempt to remove Hinojosa, along with a dozen other representatives, from office by declaring their seats vacant. The members ultimately returned to the state before the Texas Supreme Court could issue a ruling, and the maps passed through the legislature, triggering a nationwide cycle of redistricting. In May 2026, the Texas Supreme Court ruled that it did not have jurisdiction in the legislative dispute and dismissed the case against the absent members.

== Governor-elect of Texas ==
=== 2026 election ===
On October 15, 2025, Hinojosa announced her candidacy for governor of Texas in the 2026 election. Her opponents in the Democratic primary included former Representative and 2006 gubernatorial nominee Chris Bell. On March 3, 2026, she won the primary with 59.9% of the vote.

From July 1 to September 24, 2026, Hinojosa's campaign raised more than $13 million and had $4 million in the bank at the end of that period. Abbott raised more than $20 million over the same weeks and finished with $18.2 million on hand. Latino Democratic leaders urged the Democratic Governors Association to invest $10 million in Hinojosa's campaign. The DGA contributed $1 million in October 2026, its first investment in the race.

Abbott did not debate Hinojosa. He turned down invitations from four Texas news outlets. On October 15, Hinojosa held an event at an empty lectern outside the Governor's Mansion in Austin.

In the general election, Hinojosa was endorsed by Texas AFL-CIO, the editorial board of the Houston Chronicle, EMILYs List, and the Texas State Teachers Association.

Hinojosa defeated Abbott in what was widely considered an upset. Cook Political Report rated the election "lean Republican". USA Today reported that Hinojosa was considered a "long shot", and the Associated Press said she was an "underdog" candidate who "did not have significant support from the national [Democratic] party for her campaign." Hinojosa campaigned as a populist, focusing on anti-corruption, education, healthcare, cost of living, and opposing AI data centers, while dismissing accusations that she was "too woke" on cultural issues. In her campaign rhetoric, she used the term "post-partisan", and embraced the label of economic populism.

Hinojosa anticipated that if she won, she would face a Republican-dominated state legislature. She expected to use the governor's seat as a bully pulpit, saying, "Even if I win, we still have Republican control of everything in this state. ... My agenda will be one that 99 percent of us agree on, which is to secure the American dream, to save Texas public schools, put money in your pocket — a populist agenda, rather than fight fights that I know I can't win." But Democrats unexpectedly gained control of the Texas House of Representatives in the 2026 Texas Legislature elections, though Republicans maintained control of the Texas Senate. In her victory speech, Hinojosa said: "This governor's office does not belong to me. It does not belong to my party. We did not end one era of single-party rule just to usher in another. ... It belongs to Texas."

Hinojosa is the first Democrat to win the governorship in 36 years. She will also be Texas's first Latina governor and the first Latino person of any gender to hold the office. Luci Baines Johnson, daughter of former Texas Senator and President Lyndon B. Johnson, was present and celebrated at Hinojosa's victory party.

=== Transition ===
After the election, Hinojosa began preparing to succeed Governor Abbott. On November 5, 2026, she announced the initial leadership of her gubernatorial transition team, named "By and For the People", during a press conference at the Lyndon B. Johnson School of Public Affairs in Austin. Hinojosa emphasized her intention to establish a bipartisan administration and appointed people with backgrounds in Republican politics, organized labor, public education, and government administration.

Hinojosa appointed former Republican state representative Ernest Bailes and labor leader Ryan Pollock as co-chairs of the transition team. Bailes, who represented Texas House District 18 from 2017 to 2025, previously worked with Hinojosa on public education issues, including opposition to school voucher legislation. Pollock, executive director of the Texas State Building and Construction Trades Council, was selected to bring experience in organized labor, workforce development, and infrastructure policy. Hinojosa said their appointments represented her commitment to working across party lines.

Joseph Carlos "Joe" Madden, a government affairs professional with more than two decades of experience in public administration and legislative affairs, was appointed executive director. Madden previously assisted elected officials in Harris County with administrative transitions and worked on emergency management and government operations. Hinojosa also appointed Tamala Barksdale as senior adviser. Barksdale, a former trustee of the Austin Independent School District, served alongside Hinojosa on the district's school board, where they worked on fiscal management and education policy.

Public education emerged as a priority during the transition. Hinojosa reiterated her intention to replace Texas Education Agency commissioner Mike Morath, saying her team had begun interviewing candidates. She also identified public school funding and opposition to school voucher programs as priorities for her administration.

Hinojosa said that representatives of her transition team had begun communicating with Abbott's administration to facilitate the transfer of power. Although the two had not spoken directly since election night, she said Abbott had expressed his willingness to cooperate with the incoming administration. Hinojosa also called for cooperation with Republican legislators and said that additional appointments and policy announcements would follow in the weeks preceding her inauguration.

=== Tenure ===
Hinojosa will assume office on January 19, 2027.

== Political positions ==
=== Artificial intelligence ===
Hinojosa has supported more guardrails on artificial intelligence (AI). She said, "The federal government has failed to lead on this issue, and we cannot trust the billionaires profiting off of AI to self-regulate." In a September 2026 interview, she stated she would support a requirement that a verified "kill switch" be included for advanced AI systems, establishing AI capability control.

In an October 2026 interview, Hinojosa said AI should not replace teachers or nurses, and "should not be blocking opportunities for jobs." She said AI should not "replace human beings" or "be making life-and-death decisions". In August 2026, she said there should be laws to that effect, and that AI should rather "be a tool".

==== Data centers ====
Opposition to data centers was a central pillar of Hinojosa's 2026 campaign. She criticized Abbott for promoting Texas as the "epicenter" of the AI industry and for granting tax breaks for data center construction, which she said led to the Texas state government "losing more than a billion dollars a year" in revenue. She called for a moratorium on the construction of data centers in Texas, saying that data centers "are owned by the richest men in the world. We're all footing the bill. There are no rules." She said a moratorium should last "until we can pass laws to protect Texans." She also called for more guardrails on water and electricity use by existing data centers, saying, "There's no protections for people to have a seat at the table to decide if and how they come into their communities. There is no protection for water or electricity costs."

=== Cost of living ===
Hinojosa pitched her campaign on affordability, saying she wants to put money back in Texans' pocket. She has also called for freezing residential electricity rates. Under her plan, the Public Utility Commission would hold rates in place until state law required data centers and other power users to cover their own costs. She has also proposed one-time $1,500 refund checks for every Texas household, paid from the state's Rainy Day Fund. On housing, she filed HB 2334 in 2025 to restrict investment firms from buying single-family homes. The bill was referred to committee and did not advance.

=== Education ===
Hinojosa supports increased funding for public schools, and higher teacher pay.

Hinojosa has advocated for an end to the Texas school voucher program, which was signed into law by Abbott in 2025 and allows taxpayer funds to be used for private education. Hinojosa criticized the voucher program as subsidizing private school tuition for wealthy families, while public schools across Texas have shut down, shifted to a four-day schedule, or experienced teacher shortages.

Hinojosa has been a vocal opponent of the state's current academic testing regimen for children and has advocated for an end to the State of Texas Assessments of Academic Readiness (STAAR) tests. She has criticized state takeovers of local school districts, saying that "even when our schools are struggling, it is never the right answer to take schools away from their parents and community who know best." If elected as governor, she has promised to replace the Commissioner of the Texas Education Agency Mike Morath, who has overseen the recent takeovers of Houston ISD, Fort Worth ISD, Beaumont ISD and Lake Worth ISD.

In September 2026, she expressed her opposition to the widespread use of AI tools in education for young children.

=== Elections ===
In her 2026 campaign, Hinojosa stated that she would veto any partisan redistricting and gerrymandering once elected. She said, "We need a governor in Texas who will veto rigged maps. Whether they are rigged for Republicans or rigged for Democrats".

=== Healthcare ===
Hinojosa is supportive of Medicaid expansion. The Texas Tribune reported that it was a "top priority" for her. She said in November 2026, "We have the most children without health insurance of any state in America. It is a sin."

==== Abortion ====
Hinojosa supports restoring abortion access that existed under Roe v. Wade. As a state legislator, she voted against anti-abortion measures. Her 2026 campaign aired an ad with her personal story regarding a pregnancy loss she experienced, after she had decided to carry to term when medical tests found a fetal anomaly. She had previously told the story as a state legislator, while arguing against anti-abortion measures.

Hinojosa's 2026 campaign generally deemphasized the topic of abortion. She said in her campaign that, while she would expand general abortion access in Texas if it were politically possible, it would not be her "priority as governor because that takes way more than the election of a governor." Hinojosa said, as governor, she would instead focus on expanding the ability of doctors to perform abortions for the purpose of saving the lives of mothers. Separately, she said she would "make sure that Texas women have the right to make their own choices, and be able to do so with privacy and dignity."

=== Taxation ===
Hinojosa supports the suspension of the Texas state gas tax as a way to ease rising fuel prices caused by the 2026 Iran war. Campaigning as a candidate for governor, Hinojosa proposed sending a $1,500 rebate check to every Texas household from the state's Economic Stabilization Fund, which she called a "corruption tax refund." She stated she wants to lower, and ultimately eliminate, property taxes for homeowners by cutting corporate subsidies and "corrupt" government contracts.

=== Immigration and border security ===
Hinojosa previously worked for the Office of Immigrant Concerns at Catholic Charities USA.

In November 2023, Hinojosa voted against Senate Bill 3, which funded border barrier construction and border security operations, and against Senate Bill 4, which created a state crime of illegal entry. In an October 2025 interview, she said she supports securing the border and that law-abiding immigrants with roots in their communities despite having no legal status need "some kind of path to be here legally." She also called state spending on Operation Lone Star a misappropriation of taxpayer money.

Hinojosa has criticized federal immigration enforcement in Texas, saying ICE acts with "lethal lawlessness." She has called for investigations into shootings by federal immigration agents, including the March 2025 death of Ruben Ray Martinez on South Padre Island, and the July 2026 death of Lorenzo Salgado Araujo in Houston, after which she asked for body camera footage and an investigation involving the Texas Rangers.

Hinojosa has opposed the detention of children in immigration facilities. In January 2026, she called for the release of Liam Conejo Ramos, a five-year-old boy who had been detained in Texas at Dilley Immigration Processing Center. After her election, Hinojosa stated that she planned to prevent child detentions at the Dilley center (which is operated by a private prison company under contract with ICE), using Texas's regulatory authority.

In October 2026, Hinojosa said in response to ICE raids that, "Public safety should be nonpartisan. Public safety should be about keeping everybody safe. And what is happening is not that. It is distorted into something else entirely".

=== LGBTQ rights ===
Hinojosa has advocated for increased legal protections for LGBTQ Texans. In 2021, Hinojosa filed legislation to ban the gay and trans panic defense statewide, which did not become law. In May 2021, Hinojosa waved a transgender flag with the Texas House's LGBTQ Caucus in opposition to restrictions on transgender student athletes. Hinojosa said in a May 2022 interview that she had "spent a lot of time" intervening in Abbott's efforts to conduct Child Protective Services investigations into the families of trans youth.

During the 2026 Texas gubernatorial election, Hinojosa released an advertisement jokingly stating her "pronouns are Mom, Texan, and soon-to-be Governor", in response to an anti-trans ad from the Abbott campaign which referred to her as "gender-bender Gina". Hinojosa's ad sparked criticism from some trans voters. During the 2026 campaign, she said she had voted to protect access to transgender healthcare as a state legislator. She said efforts to restrict that healthcare "were an effort to punch down at Texans, right, vulnerable Texans, and I voted against those things." However, she said that it would not be her main focus as governor.

== Personal life ==
Hinojosa is married to attorney John Donisi, whom she met while both were attending the University of Texas School of Law. Donisi previously served as a personal aide to Ann Richards during her term as Governor. Donisi, who practices in Austin, specializes in government, administrative, and real estate law. The couple has two sons.

Hinojosa is the sister of Xóchitl Hinojosa, a former Obama administration communicator and Democratic National Committee spokesperson, whose given name derives from the Nahuatl word for "flower". Their father, Gilberto Hinojosa, a second-generation Mexican-American from Alamo, Texas, was the chair of the Texas Democratic Party from 2012 to 2025. Their mother, Crisanta Guerra Lozano, is an attorney who specializes in medical malpractice. She was born in San Luis Potosí, the capital of the Mexican state of the same name.

Hinojosa is a Catholic Christian. In May 2021, she said, "I was raised Mexican Catholic. I am still Catholic, and in that tradition, the value and culture of dignity is held in high esteem." In September 2026, Hinojosa said, "My faith is my moral compass."

== Electoral history ==
=== Texas House of Representatives ===
2016 Texas House of Representatives 49th district election
Primary election
Party	Candidate	Votes	%
Democratic	Gina Hinojosa	17,485	56.96
Democratic	Heather Way	5,752	18.74
Democratic	Huey Rey Fischer	4,322	14.08
Democratic	Blake Rocap	985	3.21
Democratic	other candidates	2,153	7.01
Total votes		30,697	100.0
General election
Democratic	Gina Hinojosa	68,398	84.41
Libertarian	Rick Perkins	12,631	15.59
Total votes		81,029	100.0
Democratic hold			

2018 Texas House of Representatives 49th district election
Primary election
Party	Candidate	Votes	%
Democratic	Gina Hinojosa (incumbent)	24,126	100.0
General election
Democratic	Gina Hinojosa (incumbent)	76,851	83.0
Republican	Kyle Austin	15,736	17.0
Total votes		92,587	100.0
Democratic hold			

2020 Texas House of Representatives 49th district election
Primary election
Party	Candidate	Votes	%
Democratic	Gina Hinojosa (incumbent)	43,031	100.0
Total votes		43,031	100.0
General election
Democratic	Gina Hinojosa (incumbent)	80,258	78.85
Republican	Charles Allan Meyer	18,277	17.96
Libertarian	Kenneth M. Moore	3,248	3.19
Total votes		101,783	100.0
Democratic hold			

2022 Texas House of Representatives 49th district election
Primary election
Party	Candidate	Votes	%
Democratic	Gina Hinojosa (incumbent)	21,566	100.0
Total votes		21,566	100.0
General election
Democratic	Gina Hinojosa (incumbent)	68,786	83.44
Republican	Katherine Griffin	11,882	14.41
Libertarian	J. David Roberson	1,768	2.14
Total votes		82,436	100.0
Democratic hold			

2024 Texas House of Representatives 49th district election
Primary election
Party	Candidate	Votes	%
Democratic	Gina Hinojosa (incumbent)	17,720	100.0
Total votes		17,720	100.0
General election
Democratic	Gina Hinojosa (incumbent)	80,498	100.0
Total votes		80,498	100.0
Democratic hold			

=== Governor of Texas ===
2026 Texas gubernatorial Democratic primary
Party	Candidate	Votes	%
Democratic	Gina Hinojosa	1,289,576	58.5
Democratic	Chris Bell	216,787	9.8
Democratic	Angela "Tia Angie" Villescaz	150,752	6.8
Democratic	Patricia Abrego	128,632	5.8
Democratic	Andrew White (withdrawn)	117,392	5.3
Democratic	Bobby Cole	112,675	5.1
Democratic	Jose Navarro Balbuena	65,826	3.0
Democratic	Carlton W. Hart	63,278	2.9
Democratic	Zach Vance	58,753	2.7
Total votes		2,203,671	100.00

2026 Texas gubernatorial election
Party	Candidate	Votes	%
Democratic	Gina Hinojosa	5,230,908	52.82
Republican	Greg Abbott (incumbent)	4,524,948	45.69
Libertarian	Pat Dixon	148,096	1.50
Write-in		3,987	0.0
Total votes		9,910,807	100.0
Democratic gain from Republican			

== See also ==
- List of female governors in the United States

== Notes ==
Texas House of Representatives
Preceded by Elliott Naishtat	Member of the Texas House of Representatives from the 49th district 2017–present	Incumbent
Party political offices
Preceded by Beto O'Rourke	Democratic nominee for Governor of Texas; 2026	Most recent
Political offices
Preceded by Greg Abbott	Governor of Texas; Taking office 2027	Elect
