= Texas's 47th House of Representatives district =

American legislative district

Texas's 47th State House of Representatives district
Representative
| Vikki Goodwin; D–Austin |
- Demographics: 62.1% White; 4.0% Black; 15.9% Hispanic; 16.1% Asian; 8.4% Other
- Population (2020) • Voting age: 203,643; 153,837

The Texas House of Representatives 47th district that represents west and south Travis County. The current representative of this district is Vikki Goodwin, a Democrat from Shady Hollow.

The district is home to many in Austin.

== List of representatives ==
| Leg. | Representative | Party | Term start | Term end | Counties represented |
|---|---|---|---|---|---|
| 4th | Amasa Turner | Unknown | November 3, 1851 | November 7, 1853 | Gonzales, Lavaca |
| 5th | Amasa Turner | Unknown | November 7, 1853 | November 5, 1855 | Gonzales, DeWitt |
| 5th | James Shaw | Unknown | November 7, 1853 | November 5, 1855 | Brazos, Burleson |
| 6th | James Shaw | Unknown | November 5, 1855 | November 2, 1857 | Brazos, Burleson |
| 7th | Elijah James Chance | Unknown | November 2, 1857 | November 7, 1859 | Brazos, Burleson |
| 8th | Titus Howard Mundine | Unknown | November 7, 1859 | November 4, 1861 | Brazos, Burleson |
| 9th | Constantine W. Buckley | Unknown | November 4, 1861 | November 2, 1863 | Fort Bend, Matagorda, Wharton |
| 10th | Constantine W. Buckley | Unknown | November 2, 1863 | December 19, 1865 | Fort Bend, Matagorda, Wharton |
| 11th | James D. Whitten | Unknown | August 8, 1866 | February 7, 1870 | Fort Bend, Matagorda, Wharton |
| 15th | Edward Chambers | Democratic | April 18, 1876 | January 14, 1879 | Collin |
| 16th | W.W. Merritt | Democratic | January 14, 1879 | January 11, 1881 | Collin |
| 17th | W.W. Merritt | Democratic | January 11, 1881 | January 9, 1883 | Collin |
| 18th | Joseph Rushing | Democratic | January 9, 1883 | January 13, 1885 | Kaufman, Texas |
| 19th | James S. Woods | Democratic | January 13, 1885 | January 11, 1887 | Kaufman, Texas |
| 20th | Sanctus Waskom | Democratic | January 11, 1887 | January 8, 1889 | Kaufman, Texas |
| 21st | James Eldrage Dillard | Democratic | January 8, 1889 | January 13, 1891 | Kaufman, Texas |
| 22nd | Marshall Gossett | Democratic | January 10, 1893 | January 13, 1891 | Kaufman, Texas |
| 23rd | Nathan E. Dever | Democratic | January 10, 1893 | January 8, 1895 | Washington County, Texas |
| 24th | Dewitt Clinton Giddings Jr. | Democratic | January 8, 1895 | January 12, 1897 | Washington County, Texas |
| 25th | Ben S. Rogers | Democratic | January 12, 1897 | January 10, 1899 | Washington County, Texas |
| 26th | Ben S. Rogers | Democratic | January 10, 1899 | January 8, 1901 | Washington County, Texas |
| 27th | Samuel H. Goodlett | Democratic | January 8, 1901 | January 13, 1903 | Washington County, Texas |
| 28th | John Mortimer Johnson | Democratic | January 13, 1903 | January 10, 1905 | Lee, Washington |
| 29th | William David "Davie" Crockett | Democratic | January 10, 1905 | January 8, 1907 | Lee, Washington |
| 30th | Henry Frank Schlosshan | Democratic | January 8, 1907 | January 12, 1909 | Lee, Washington |
| 31st | James P. Buchanan | Democratic | January 12, 1909 | January 10, 1911 | Lee, Washington |
| 32nd | James P. Buchanan | Democratic | January 10, 1911 | January 14, 1913 | Lee, Washington |
| 33rd | Thomas Garland Collins | Democratic | January 14, 1913 | January 12, 1915 | Dallas, Kaufman |
| 34th | James A. Florer | Democratic | January 12, 1915 | January 9, 1917 | Dallas, Kaufman |
| 35th | James A. Florer | Democratic | January 9, 1917 | February 26, 1918 | Dallas, Kaufman |
| 36th | John Davis | Democratic | January 14, 1919 | January 11, 1921 | Dallas, Kaufman |
| 37th | John Davis | Democratic | January 11, 1921 | October 24, 1921 | Dallas, Kaufman |
| 38th | Robert Lee Bob Cable | Democratic | January 9, 1923 | January 13, 1925 | Montague County, Texas |
| 39th | Thomas Luther Walker | Democratic | January 13, 1925 | January 11, 1927 | Montague County, Texas |
| 40th | Thomas Luther Walker | Democratic | January 11, 1927 | January 8, 1929 | Montague County, Texas |
| 41st | John Paul Finn | Democratic | January 8, 1929 | January 13, 1931 | Montague County, Texas |
| 42nd | John Paul Finn | Democratic | January 13, 1931 | January 10, 1933 | Montague County, Texas |
| 43rd | Franklin A. Wood | Democratic | January 10, 1933 | January 8, 1935 | Montague County, Texas |
| 44th | Franklin A. Wood | Democratic | January 8, 1935 | January 12, 1937 | Montague County, Texas |
| 45th | Marvin Flynt London | Democratic | January 12, 1937 | January 10, 1939 | Montague County, Texas |
| 46th | Marvin Flynt London | Democratic | January 10, 1939 | September 27, 1939 | Montague County, Texas |
| 46th | Earl Clinton Fitts | Democratic | November 28, 1939 | January 14, 1941 | Montague County, Texas |
| 47th | Paul Edwin Donald | Democratic | January 14, 1941 | January 12, 1943 | Montague County, Texas |
| 48th | Paul Edwin Donald | Democratic | January 12, 1943 | January 9, 1945 | Montague County, Texas |
| 49th | Elmer Lee Covey | Democratic | January 9, 1945 | January 14, 1947 | Montague County, Texas |
| 50th | Wayne Warren Wagonseller | Democratic | January 14, 1947 | January 11, 1949 | Montague County, Texas |
| 51st | Wayne Warren Wagonseller | Democratic | January 11, 1949 | January 9, 1951 | Montague County, Texas |
| 52nd | Anthony Paul Fenoglio | Democratic | January 9, 1951 | January 13, 1953 | Montague County, Texas |
| 53rd | Fredrick A. Niemann | Democratic | January 13, 1953 | January 11, 1955 | Gonzales, Lavaca |
| 54th | Fredrick A. Niemann | Democratic | January 11, 1955 | January 8, 1957 | Gonzales, Lavaca |
| 55th | Stanley E. Boysen | Democratic | January 8, 1957 | January 13, 1959 | Gonzales, Lavaca |
| 56th | Stanley E. Boysen | Democratic | January 13, 1959 | January 10, 1961 | Gonzales, Lavaca |
| 57th | Stanley E. Boysen | Democratic | January 10, 1961 | January 8, 1963 | Gonzales, Lavaca |
| 58th | Stanley E. Boysen | Democratic | January 8, 1963 | January 12, 1965 | DeWitt, Gonzales, Lavaca |
| 59th | Joseph Terry Newman, Sr. | Democratic | January 12, 1965 | January 10, 1967 | DeWitt, Gonzales, Lavaca |
| 63rd | Jon Paul Newton | Democratic | January 9, 1973 | January 14, 1975 | Atascosa, Bee, Dimmit, La Salle Live Oak, McMullen, Wilson |
| 64th | Jon Paul Newton | Democratic | January 14, 1975 | January 11, 1977 | Atascosa, Bee, Dimmit, La Salle Live Oak, McMullen, Wilson |
| 65th | Thomas Jefferson Martin, Jr. | Democratic | January 11, 1977 | January 9, 1979 | Atascosa, Bee, Dimmit, La Salle Live Oak, McMullen, Wilson |
| 66th | Thomas Jefferson Martin, Jr. | Democratic | January 9, 1979 | January 13, 1981 | Atascosa, Bee, Dimmit, La Salle Live Oak, McMullen, Wilson |
| 67th | Jay Harvey Reynolds | Republican | January 13, 1981 | January 11, 1983 | Atascosa, Bee, Dimmit, La Salle Live Oak, McMullen, Wilson |
| 68th | Robert Barton, Jr. | Democratic | January 11, 1983 | January 8, 1985 | Blanco, Hays, Llano, Travis |
| 69th | Margaret Anne Cooper | Republican | January 8, 1985 | January 13, 1987 | Blanco, Hays, Llano, Travis |
| 70th | Margaret Anne Cooper | Republican | January 13, 1987 | January 10, 1989 | Blanco, Hays, Llano, Travis |
| 71st | Elizabeth Ann Linebarger | Democratic | January 10, 1989 | January 8, 1991 | Blanco, Hays, Llano, Travis |
| 72nd | Elizabeth Ann Linebarger | Democratic | January 8, 1991 | January 12, 1993 | Blanco, Hays, Llano, Travis |
| 73rd | Susan Combs | Republican | January 12, 1993 | January 10, 1995 | Travis |
| 74th | Susan Combs | Republican | January 10, 1995 | January 26, 1996 | Travis |
| 74th | Patty Keel | Republican | June 14, 1996 | January 14, 1997 | Travis |
| 75th | Terry Keel | Republican | January 14, 1997 | January 12, 1999 | Travis |
| 76th | Terry Keel | Republican | January 12, 1999 | January 9, 2001 | Travis |
| 77th | Terry Keel | Republican | January 9, 2001 | January 14, 2003 | Travis |
| 78th | Terry Keel | Republican | January 14, 2003 | January 11, 2005 | Travis |
| 79th | Terry Keel | Republican | January 11, 2005 | January 9, 2007 | Travis |
| 80th | Valinda Bolton | Democratic | January 9, 2007 | January 13, 2009 | Travis |
| 81st | Valinda Bolton | Democratic | January 13, 2009 | January 11, 2011 | Travis |
| 82nd | Paul Workman | Republican | January 11, 2011 | January 8, 2013 | Travis |
| 83rd | Paul Workman | Republican | January 8, 2013 | January 13, 2015 | Travis |
| 84th | Paul Workman | Republican | January 13, 2015 | January 10, 2017 | Travis |
| 85th | Paul Workman | Republican | January 10, 2017 | January 8, 2019 | Travis |
| 86th | Vikki Goodwin | Democratic | January 8, 2019 | January 12, 2021 | Travis |
| 87th | Vikki Goodwin | Democratic | January 12, 2021 | January 9, 2021 | Travis |
| 88th | Vikki Goodwin | Democratic | January 9, 2023 | January 9, 2025 | Travis |
| 89th | Vikki Goodwin | Democratic | January 9, 2025 | January 7, 2027 | |
