= Vikki Goodwin =

American politician (born 1967)

- Goodwin in 2019

Lieutenant Governor-elect of Texas
- Assuming office January 19, 2027
- Governor: Gina Hinojosa (elect)
- Succeeding: Dan Patrick

Member of the Texas House of Representatives from the 47th district
- Incumbent
- Assumed office January 8, 2019
- Preceded by: Paul Workman

Personal details
- Born: Vikki Ann Vondracek; May 18, 1967 (age 59) Arlington Heights, Illinois, U.S.
- Party: Democratic
- Education: University of Texas at Austin (BBA, MPA)
- Website: Campaign website

Vikki Ann Goodwin (born May 18, 1967) is an American politician who is the lieutenant governor-elect of Texas. A member of the Democratic Party, she has represented the 47th district in the Texas House of Representatives since 2019. After securing her party's nomination for lieutenant governor in the 2026 election, Goodwin defeated incumbent Lieutenant Governor Dan Patrick on November 3. She owns a residential real estate business with her husband.

== Early life and education ==
Goodwin was born Vikki Ann Vondracek in Arlington Heights, Illinois. In 1969, her family moved to Dallas where she grew up and her mother, Betty Sue Bumgarner Vondracek, was elected to the Dallas ISD school board in 1986. Her father, Rudy Vondracek, was shot and killed at the family’s home in a 1990 cold case, five years after her brother was killed by a drunk driver.

Goodwin moved to Austin to attend the University of Texas in 1985, where she earned her Bachelor of Business Administration in marketing in May 1989 and her Master of Public Affairs from the LBJ School of Public Affairs in May 1991.

== Texas House of Representatives ==
On November 6, 2018, Goodwin won the general election with 52%, defeating incumbent Republican Paul Workman who got 48% of the vote. Her service as a State Representative has been focused on issues concerning public education, child welfare, and comprehensive healthcare.

Goodwin is known for her work helping pass 'Cati's Act', a drowning prevention act meant to expand safety regulations for children under twelve. In addition she filed the 'Natalia Cox Act', meant to aid victims of domestic violence by requiring police officers and medical professionals to provide victims with resources.

In 2025, Goodwin was one of the Democratic members of the Texas House who participated in a quorum-bust to delay the passage of controversial new congressional maps. While she was absent from the state, Texas Attorney General Ken Paxton filed a lawsuit to have her seat, along with those of 12 other representatives, declared vacant and remove them from office. In May 2026, the Texas Supreme Court ruled that it did not have jurisdiction in the legislative dispute and dismissed the case against the absent members.

During the 89th legislative session she was a member of the House Appropriations Committee and the House Insurance Committee. In prior legislative sessions, she served on the House Committees of Agriculture and Livestock, Environmental Regulation, Homeland Security and Public Safety, Urban Affairs, and the House Select Committee on Community Safety.

== Lieutenant Governor-elect of Texas ==
=== 2026 election ===
In May 2025, Goodwin announced her candidacy for lieutenant governor in the 2026 election. In the Democratic primary she faced union leader Marcos Velez and software manager Courtney Head. On March 3, Goodwin secured 48% of the vote to Velez's 31.5% and Head's 20.5%. With no candidate receiving the majority, Goodwin and Velez advanced to a runoff election that was held on May 26, 2026. Goodwin won the runoff, becoming the Democratic nominee. She defeated lieutenant governor Dan Patrick in the general election.

On September 19, 2026, Goodwin filed a police complaint with the Travis County sheriff's office against Patrick for posting two AI-generated advertisements depicting Goodwin. She alleged that the videos violated a 2019 Texas law making it a criminal offense to publish or distribute deceptive AI-generated deepfake videos targeting political candidates within 30 days of an election because in-person early voting begins on October 19, 2026. Patrick's campaign denied it broke the law but took down the advertisements the following day.

Goodwin won the election, becoming the first woman elected lieutenant governor of Texas.

== Political positions ==
Goodwin has often been ranked as one of the most progressive members of the Texas House.

=== Public education ===
Goodwin has described herself as "a passionate supporter of Texas public schools" and has been a vocal opponent against the use of private school vouchers. If elected as lieutenant governor, she has stated that she "will not pass a budget that has any money going to a private school voucher scam". Goodwin has also supported providing additional funds to retired teachers.

=== Gun laws ===
In 2023, Goodwin filed legislation that would require universal background checks for purchasing firearms and would require a three day waiting period before the weapon could be delivered. The bills died in committee. During the same legislative session, Goodwin attempted to amend a bill that would criminalize the possession and sale of "Glock switches" to increase the minimum age of possession certain weapons to 21, but the amendment failed on a point of order. Goodwin opposed a law passed that would require an armed police or school employee at every school in Texas as a means to combat school shootings.

=== Data centers ===
Goodwin has called for a moratorium on the construction of new AI data centers within the state and has called for Governor Greg Abbott to call a special session to discuss potential reforms to the industry regarding the consumption of resources and economic incentives.

=== Healthcare ===
Goodwin supports Medicaid expansion and has proposed the creation of a comprehensive state run health insurance program.

== Electoral history ==
2018 Texas House of Representatives 47th district election
Primary election
Party	Candidate	Votes	%
Democratic	Vikki Goodwin	5,389	33.64
Democratic	Elaina Fowler	4,674	29.18
Democratic	Sheri Soltes	3,794	23.69
Democratic	Candice Aylor	1,187	7.41
Democratic	Will Simpson	974	6.08
Total votes		16,018	100.0

Primary Runoff election
Party	Candidate	Votes	%
Democratic	Vikki Goodwin	4,676	58.11
Democratic	Elaina Fowler	3,371	41.89
Total votes		8,047	100.0

General election
Party	Candidate	Votes	%
Democratic	Vikki Goodwin	55,307	52.4
Republican	Paul Workman (incumbent)	50,244	47.6
Total votes		105,551	100.0
Democratic gain from Republican			

2020 Texas House of Representatives 47th district General election
Party	Candidate	Votes	%
Democratic	Vikki Goodwin (incumbent)	66,816	49.3
Republican	Justin Berry	65,474	48.3
Libertarian	Michael Clark	3,311	2.4
Total votes		135,601	100.0
Democratic hold			

2022 Texas House of Representatives 47th district General election
Party	Candidate	Votes	%
Democratic	Vikki Goodwin (incumbent)	51,045	61.3
Republican	Rob McCarthy	32,272	38.7
Total votes		83,317	100.0
Democratic hold			

2024 Texas House of Representatives 47th district General election
Party	Candidate	Votes	%
Democratic	Vikki Goodwin (incumbent)	59,016	60.2
Republican	Scott Firsing	39,066	39.8
Total votes		98,082	100.0
Democratic hold			

2026 Texas Lieutenant Governor Democratic primary
Party	Candidate	Votes	%
Democratic	Vikki Goodwin	1,012,055	48.0
Democratic	Marcos Isaias Velez	663,449	31.5
Democratic	Courtney Head	431,833	20.5
Total votes		2,107,387	100.0

2026 Texas Lieutenant Governor Democratic primary runoff
Party	Candidate	Votes	%
Democratic	Vikki Goodwin	374,821	67.8
Democratic	Marcos Isaias Velez	178,274	32.2
Total votes		553,095	100.0

Party political offices
Preceded by Mike Collier	Democratic nominee for Lieutenant Governor of Texas; 2026	Most recent
Political offices
Preceded by Mike Collier	Lieutenant Governor of Texas; Taking office 2027	Elect
