= Rhetta Bowers =

American politician (born 1967)

Member of the Texas House of Representatives from the 113th district
- Incumbent
- Assumed office January 8, 2019
- Preceded by: Cindy Burkett

Personal details
- Born: July 22, 1967 (age 59) Houston, Texas, U.S.
- Party: Democratic
- Education: Texas Southern University (BA)

Rhetta Andrews Bowers (born July 22, 1967) is an American politician and educator, currently serving as a member of the Texas House of Representatives from the 113th district.

== Early life and education ==
Bowers was born and raised in Houston. She earned a Bachelor of Arts degree in Telecommunications, with an emphasis in Broadcast Journalism, from Texas Southern University. In middle school, Bowers volunteered with Congressman Mickey Leland's campaign.

== Career ==
Bowers has worked as a substitute teacher and served on the Rowlett Parks and Recreation Advisory Board for eight years. Bowers also served as the Chair of the Dallas Woman’s March. She is an active member of the St. Paul United Methodist Church. Bowers took office on January 8, 2019, succeeding incumbent Republican Cindy Burkett, who retired from the house to run for the Texas Senate. In January 2020, Bowers endorsed Joe Biden in the 2020 Democratic Party presidential primaries.
