= Barbara Gervin-Hawkins =

Democratic Texas legislator

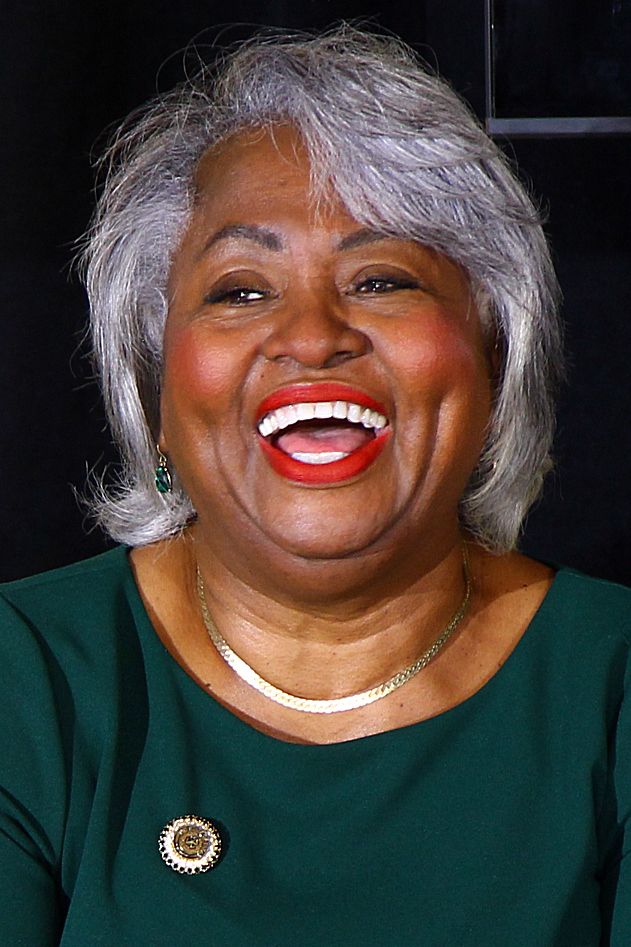
- Gervin-Hawkins in 2023

Member of the Texas House of Representatives from the 120th district
- Incumbent
- Assumed office January 10, 2017
- Preceded by: Laura Thompson

Personal details
- Born: April 3, 1954 (age 72)
- Party: Democratic
- Education: Eastern Michigan University

Barbara Gervin-Hawkins (née Gervin; born April 3, 1954) is an American politician. She is a Democratic member of the Texas House of Representatives, representing the 120th District. She defeated incumbent Laura Thompson, an independent, in the November 2016 general election.

== Biography ==
Gervin-Hawkins was raised in Michigan by a single mother of six. She graduated from Eastern Michigan University in 1975 with a degree in accounting. Her first job was at the Ford Motor Company. She moved to San Antonio, Texas, after her brother, professional basketball player George Gervin, who played for the NBA's San Antonio Spurs, hired her as his personal accountant. In 1991, the siblings founded the George Gervin Youth Center in San Antonio.

Gervin-Hawkins was married to Robert Hawkins, a professional basketball player.
