= Elliott Naishtat =

American politician

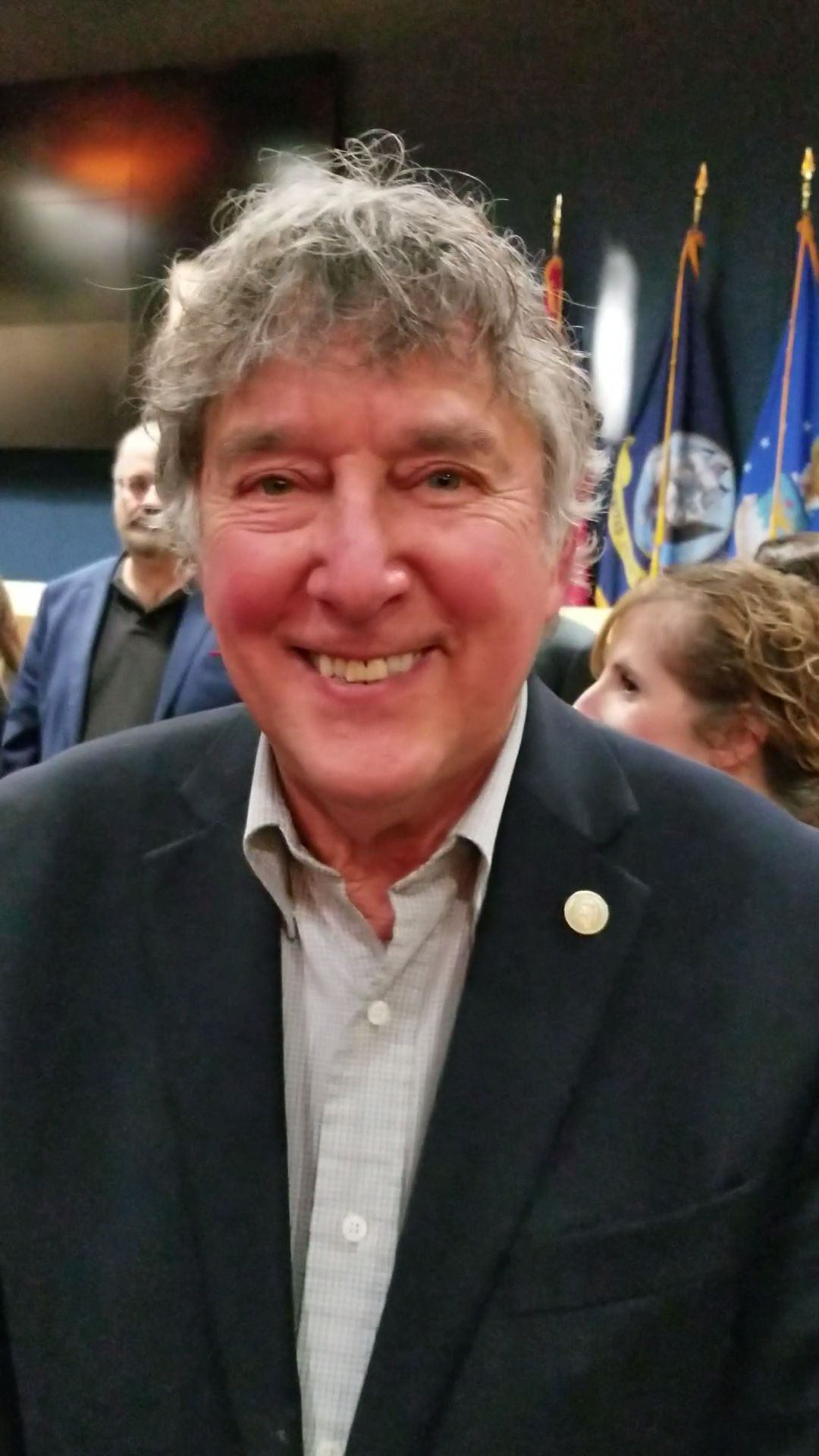

Member of the Texas House of Representatives from the 49th district
- In office January 8, 1991 – January 10, 2017
- Preceded by: Bob Richardson
- Succeeded by: Gina Hinojosa

Personal details
- Born: February 15, 1945 (age 81) New York City, United States
- Party: Democratic

Elliott Naishtat (born February 15, 1945) is an American Democratic politician. He is a former member of the Texas House of Representatives from the 49th District, having served from 1991 until January 2017. Considered a liberal legislator, Naishtat focused on having a positive effect on health and human services, particularly the needs of low- and moderate-income people.

== Early years ==
Born in New York, Naishtat received his bachelor's degree in Political Science from Queens College in 1965. Volunteering with VISTA in Johnson's War on Poverty, he was sent to Eagle Pass, Texas, where he organized residents to improve streets and access to water, but as he observed later, "we didn't eliminate poverty." After completing his VISTA service, he moved to Austin and in 1972 obtained his Master of Science in Social Work (MSSW) with a concentration in Community Organization from the University of Texas at Austin, and his JD from the UT School of Law in 1982.

Naishtat worked for Senator Gonzalo Barrientos as staff counsel and later entered private practice. He directed the U.T. School of Social Work's Legislative Training Program and served as chairman of Austin's Community Development Commission.

== Texas legislator ==
In November 1990, Naishtat was elected to the District 49 seat in the Texas House of Representatives. He served as chair of the House Human Services Committee for nearly a decade and also as Vice Chair of the Public Health Committee, and was a founding board member of the House Progressive Caucus. He was re-elected twelve times and passed 330 bills during his 26-year career in the Texas House.

Two of Naishtat's most notable bills were the Nursing Home Regulatory Reform Act, which garnered national publicity, and the Medicaid Simplification Act, which enabled tens of thousands of children to get on Medicaid. Other bills included the Newborn Hearing Screening Act, Landlord-Tenant Security Devices Act, Indoor Air Quality Act, Nursing Home Reform Act, Braille Literacy Act, Child Protective Services Act, and the Seniors' Property Tax Relief Act. He also passed bills that created a statewide guardianship program, improved child labor law enforcement, and expanded protective services for elderly and disabled people. Naishtat served as an advisor to the Texas Holocaust and Genocide Commission. He also sought a review the state's death penalty policies and supported medical uses of marijuana.

== Recognition ==
Naishtat's accomplishments have been recognized by awards from multiple organizations, including the American Cancer Society, Texas Council on Family Violence, Sierra Club, Texas Public Health Association, AARP, American Foundation for the Blind, Texas Legal Services Center, Equality Texas, Common Cause, Texas CASA and Texas Freedom Network. In 1999, he received the Public Elected Official of the Year award from the National Association of Social Workers. In 2002, he received the National Consumer Health Advocate award from Families USA. Naishtat received the President's Lifetime Achievement Award from the Corporation for National and Community Service, which oversees VISTA and AmeriCorps in December 2016. He has also been named Legislator of the Year by the Texas Apartment Association and one of Texas' Outstanding Public Servants by the Consumers Union, Public Citizen, Gray Panthers, and Texas Citizen Action.
