= List of political endorsements by Donald Trump =

This is a list of political endorsements issued by Donald Trump, the 45th and 47th president of the United States, prior to his becoming president as well as during his time as president and between his two terms.

== Domestic ==
(Italics indicate incumbents)

=== Before presidency ===
==== 2008 ====
Position	Candidate	Result
(United States) President	Hillary Clinton	Lost primary
(United States) President	John McCain	Lost general

==== 2012 ====
Position	Candidate	Result
(United States) President	Mitt Romney	Lost general

==== 2016 Senate elections ====
State	Candidate	Result
Arizona	John McCain	Elected
Florida	Marco Rubio	Elected
Louisiana	John Kennedy	Elected
New Hampshire	Kelly Ayotte	Lost general

==== 2016 House elections ====
District	Candidate	Result
(California) CA-49	Darrell Issa	Elected
(Wisconsin) WI-01	Paul Ryan	Elected

=== First term as president ===
==== 2017 gubernatorial elections ====
State	Candidate	Result
Virginia	Ed Gillespie	Lost general

==== 2017 Senate elections ====
State	Candidate	Result
Alabama (special)	Luther Strange	Lost primary
Alabama (special)	Roy Moore	Lost general

==== 2017 House elections ====
District	Candidate	Result
(Georgia (U.S. state)) GA-06 (special)	Karen Handel	Elected
(Kansas) KS-04 (special)	Ron Estes	Elected
(Montana) MT-AL (special)	Greg Gianforte	Elected
(South Carolina) SC-05 (special)	Ralph Norman	Elected

==== 2018 gubernatorial elections ====
State	Candidate	Result
Alaska	Mike Dunleavy	Elected
Arizona	Doug Ducey	Elected
Arkansas	Asa Hutchinson	Elected
California	John H. Cox	Lost general
Colorado	Walker Stapleton	Lost general
Connecticut	Bob Stefanowski	Lost general
Florida	Ron DeSantis	Elected
(Georgia (U.S. state)) Georgia	Brian Kemp	Elected
Kansas	Kris Kobach	Lost general
Michigan	Bill Schuette	Lost general
Minnesota	Jeff Johnson	Lost general
Nevada	Adam Laxalt	Lost general
Ohio	Mike DeWine	Elected
Oklahoma	Kevin Stitt	Elected
South Carolina	Henry McMaster	Elected
South Dakota	Kristi Noem	Elected
Tennessee	Bill Lee	Elected
Texas	Greg Abbott	Elected
Wisconsin	Scott Walker	Lost general
Wyoming	Foster Friess	Lost primary

==== 2018 Senate elections ====
State	Candidate	Result
Arizona	Martha McSally	Lost general
Florida	Rick Scott	Elected
Indiana	Mike Braun	Elected
Michigan	John James	Lost general
Minnesota (special)	Karin Housley	Lost general
Mississippi (special)	Cindy Hyde-Smith	Elected
Mississippi	Roger Wicker	Elected
Missouri	Josh Hawley	Elected
Montana	Matt Rosendale	Lost general
Nebraska	Deb Fischer	Elected
Nevada	Dean Heller	Lost general
New Jersey	Bob Hugin	Lost general
North Dakota	Kevin Cramer	Elected
Ohio	Jim Renacci	Lost general
Pennsylvania	Lou Barletta	Lost general
Tennessee	Marsha Blackburn	Elected
Texas	Ted Cruz	Elected
Utah	Mitt Romney	Elected
West Virginia	Evan Jenkins (co-endorsement with Morrisey)	Lost primary
West Virginia	Patrick Morrisey (co-endorsement with Jenkins)	Lost general
Wisconsin	Leah Vukmir	Lost general
Wyoming	John Barrasso	Elected

==== 2018 House elections ====
District	Candidate	Result
(Alabama) AL-02	Martha Roby	Elected
(Arizona) AZ-08	Debbie Lesko	Elected
(California) CA-08	Paul Cook	Elected
(California) CA-21	Devin Nunes	Elected
(California) CA-23	Kevin McCarthy	Elected
(California) CA-48	Dana Rohrabacher	Lost general
(California) CA-49	Diane Harkey	Lost general
(Florida) FL-01	Matt Gaetz	Elected
(Florida) FL-02	Neal Dunn	Elected
(Florida) FL-03	Ted Yoho	Elected
(Florida) FL-06	Mike Waltz	Elected
(Florida) FL-15	Ross Spano	Elected
(Illinois) IL-14	Randy Hultgren	Lost general
(Iowa) IA-01	Rod Blum	Lost general
(Kansas) KS-03	Kevin Yoder	Lost general
(Kentucky) KY-06	Andy Barr	Elected
(Louisiana) LA-03	Clay Higgins	Elected
(Maine) ME-02	Bruce Poliquin	Lost general
(Michigan) MI-11	Lena Epstein	Lost general
(Minnesota) MN-01	Jim Hagedorn	Elected
(Minnesota) MN-02	Jason Lewis	Lost general
(Minnesota) MN-03	Erik Paulsen	Lost general
(Minnesota) MN-06	Tom Emmer	Elected
(Minnesota) MN-07	Dave Hughes	Lost general
(Minnesota) MN-08	Pete Stauber	Elected
(Montana) MT-AL	Greg Gianforte	Elected
(Nevada) NV-03	Danny Tarkanian	Lost general
(New Jersey) NJ-11	Jay Webber	Lost general
(New York (state)) NY-01	Lee Zeldin	Elected
(New York (state)) NY-02	Peter King	Elected
(New York (state)) NY-11	Dan Donovan	Lost general
(New York (state)) NY-19	John Faso	Lost general
(New York (state)) NY-22	Claudia Tenney	Lost general
(New York (state)) NY-23	Tom Reed	Elected
(North Carolina) NC-09	Mark Harris	Lost general
(North Carolina) NC-13	Ted Budd	Elected
(Ohio) OH-12 (special)	Troy Balderson	Elected
(Ohio) OH-12	Troy Balderson	Elected
(Pennsylvania) PA-08	John Chrin	Lost general
(Pennsylvania) PA-10	Scott Perry	Elected
(Pennsylvania) PA-11	Lloyd Smucker	Elected
(Pennsylvania) PA-17	Keith Rothfus	Lost general
(Pennsylvania) PA-18 (special)	Rick Saccone	Lost general
(South Carolina) SC-01	Katie Arrington	Lost general
(Tennessee) TN-08	David Kustoff	Elected
(Texas) TX-08	Kevin Brady	Elected
(Texas) TX-32	Pete Sessions	Lost general
(Virginia) VA-05	Denver Riggleman	Elected
(Virginia) VA-07	Dave Brat	Lost general
(Washington (state)) WA-05	Cathy McMorris Rodgers	Elected
(West Virginia) WV-03	Carol Miller	Elected
(Wisconsin) WI-01	Bryan Steil	Elected

==== 2018 state executive elections ====
State	Office	Candidate	Result
(Georgia (U.S. state)) Georgia	Secretary of State	Brad Raffensperger	Elected
Texas	Land Commissioner	George P. Bush	Elected
Texas	Railroad Commissioner	Christi Craddick	Elected
Texas	Comptroller of Public Accounts	Glenn Hegar	Elected
Texas	Commissioner of Agriculture	Sid Miller	Elected
Texas	Lieutenant Governor	Dan Patrick	Elected
Texas	Attorney General	Ken Paxton	Elected

==== 2019 Speaker of the House of Representatives election ====
Position	Candidate	Result
(United States) Speaker	Nancy Pelosi (Democrat)	Elected

==== 2019 gubernatorial elections ====
State	Candidate	Result
Kentucky	Matt Bevin	Lost general
Louisiana	Eddie Rispone (co-endorsement with Abraham)	Lost runoff
Louisiana	Ralph Abraham (co-endorsement with Rispone)	Lost primary
Mississippi	Tate Reeves	Elected

==== 2019 House elections ====
District	Candidate	Result
(North Carolina) NC-03 (special)	Greg Murphy	Elected
(North Carolina) NC-09 (special)	Dan Bishop	Elected
(Pennsylvania) PA-12 (special)	Fred Keller	Elected

==== 2019 state court elections ====
State	Office	Candidate	Result
Pennsylvania	Superior Court Judge	Megan McCarthy King	Elected

==== 2019 state executive elections ====
State	Office	Candidate	Result
Kentucky	Attorney General	Daniel Cameron	Elected

==== 2019 state legislative elections ====
State	Office	Candidate	Result
Virginia	State Senator	Geary Higgins	Lost general

==== 2020 Senate elections ====
State	Candidate	Result
Alabama	Tommy Tuberville	Elected
Alaska	Dan Sullivan	Elected
Arizona (special)	Martha McSally	Lost general
Colorado	Cory Gardner	Lost general
(Georgia (U.S. state)) Georgia	David Perdue	Lost runoff
(Georgia (U.S. state)) Georgia (special)	Kelly Loeffler	Lost runoff
Idaho	Jim Risch	Elected
Iowa	Joni Ernst	Elected
Kansas	Roger Marshall	Elected
Kentucky	Mitch McConnell	Elected
Louisiana	Bill Cassidy	Elected
Michigan	John James	Lost general
Minnesota	Jason Lewis	Lost general
Mississippi	Cindy Hyde-Smith	Elected
Montana	Steve Daines	Elected
Nebraska	Ben Sasse	Elected
New Hampshire	Bryant "Corky" Messner	Lost general
North Carolina	Thom Tillis	Elected
Oklahoma	Jim Inhofe	Elected
South Carolina	Lindsey Graham	Elected
South Dakota	Mike Rounds	Elected
Tennessee	Bill Hagerty	Elected
Texas	John Cornyn	Elected
West Virginia	Shelley Moore Capito	Elected
Wyoming	Cynthia Lummis	Elected

==== 2020 House elections ====
District	Candidate	Result
(Alabama) AL-01	Jerry Carl	Elected
(Alabama) AL-02	Barry Moore	Elected
(Alabama) AL-05	Mo Brooks	Elected
(Alaska) AK-AL	Don Young	Elected
(Arizona) AZ-01	Tiffany Shedd	Lost general
(Arizona) AZ-04	Paul Gosar	Elected
(Arizona) AZ-08	Debbie Lesko	Elected
(California) CA-04	Tom McClintock	Elected
(California) CA-08	Jay Obernolte	Elected
(California) CA-25	Mike Garcia	Elected
(California) CA-43	Joe Collins	Lost general
(California) CA-50	Darrell Issa	Elected
(Colorado) CO-03	Lauren Boebert	Elected
(Colorado) CO-03	Scott Tipton	Lost primary
(Colorado) CO-04	Ken Buck	Elected
(Florida) FL-03	Kat Cammack	Elected
(Florida) FL-04	Bill Posey	Elected

=== Between presidential terms ===
==== 2022 gubernatorial elections ====
State	Candidate	Result
Alaska	Mike Dunleavy	Elected
Arizona	Kari Lake	Lost general
Arkansas	Sarah Huckabee Sanders	Elected
(Georgia (U.S. state)) Georgia	David Perdue	Lost primary
Idaho	Janice McGeachin	Lost primary
Illinois	Darren Bailey	Lost general
Iowa	Kim Reynolds	Elected
Kansas	Derek Schmidt	Lost general
Maryland	Dan Cox	Lost general
Massachusetts	Geoff Diehl	Lost general
Michigan	Tudor Dixon	Lost general
Minnesota	Scott Jensen	Lost general
Nebraska	Charles Herbster	Lost primary
Nevada	Joe Lombardo	Elected
New Mexico	Mark Ronchetti	Lost general
(New York (state)) New York	Lee Zeldin	Lost general
Ohio	Mike DeWine	Elected
Oklahoma	Kevin Stitt	Elected
Pennsylvania	Doug Mastriano	Lost general
South Carolina	Henry McMaster	Elected
South Dakota	Kristi Noem	Elected
Tennessee	Bill Lee	Elected
Texas	Greg Abbott	Elected
Wisconsin	Tim Michels	Lost general

==== 2022 Senate elections ====
State	Candidate	Result
Alabama	~~Mo Brooks~~ (rescinded endorsement)	Lost primary
Alabama	Katie Britt	Elected
Alaska	Kelly Tshibaka	Lost general
Arizona	Blake Masters	Lost general
Arkansas	John Boozman	Elected
Connecticut	Leora Levy	Lost general
Florida	Marco Rubio	Elected
(Georgia (U.S. state)) Georgia	Herschel Walker	Lost runoff
Idaho	Mike Crapo	Elected
Iowa	Chuck Grassley	Elected
Kansas	Jerry Moran	Elected
Kentucky	Rand Paul	Elected
Louisiana	John Kennedy	Elected
Missouri	Eric Schmitt (co-endorsement with Greitens)	Elected
Missouri	Eric Greitens (co-endorsement with Schmitt)	Lost primary
Nevada	Adam Laxalt	Lost general
New Hampshire	Don Bolduc	Lost general
North Carolina	Ted Budd	Elected
North Dakota	John Hoeven	Elected
Ohio	JD Vance	Elected
Oklahoma	James Lankford	Elected
Oklahoma (special)	Markwayne Mullin	Elected
Pennsylvania	~~Sean Parnell~~ (withdrew candidacy)	Withdrew
Pennsylvania	Mehmet Oz	Lost general
South Carolina	Tim Scott	Elected
Utah	Mike Lee	Elected
Vermont	Gerald Malloy	Lost general
Wisconsin	Ron Johnson	Elected

==== 2022 House elections ====
District	Candidate	Primary date	Seat status	Result
(Michigan) MI-03	John Gibbs	August 2, 2022	Challenger	Lost general
(Washington (state)) WA-03	Joe Kent	August 2, 2022	Challenger	Lost general
(Wyoming) WY-AL	Harriet Hageman	August 16, 2022	Challenger	Elected
(New York (state)) NY-10	Dan Goldman (Democrat)	August 23, 2022	Open seat	Elected
(New York (state)) NY-12	Carolyn Maloney (Democrat)	August 23, 2022	Incumbent	Lost primary

==== 2022 state executive elections ====
State	Office	Candidate	Result
Arizona	Attorney General	Abraham Hamadeh	Lost general
Arizona	Secretary of State	Mark Finchem	Lost general

==== Other elections ====
- 2022 Alaska's at-large congressional district special election: endorsed Sarah Palin (advanced to general election from nonpartisan blanket primary but lost general election).
- 2022 election to Arizona's 7th legislative district: endorsed Wendy Rogers (won primary).
- 2022 election to Miami-Dade County's 6th District: endorsed Kevin Marino Cabrera (won primary and general).

==== 2023 Speaker of the House of Representatives elections ====
Election	Candidate	Result
(United States) January election	Kevin McCarthy	Elected
(United States) October election	Jim Jordan (Note: Until the House Republican Conference unselected him.)	Unselected by the House Republican Conference
(United States) October election	Mike Johnson (Note: After the House Republican Conference unselected Jim Jordan.)	Elected

==== 2023 gubernatorial elections ====
State	Candidate	Result
Kentucky	Daniel Cameron	Lost general
Louisiana	Jeff Landry	Elected
Mississippi	Tate Reeves	Elected

==== 2023 state executive elections ====
State	Office	Candidate	Primary date	Seat status	Primary result
Louisiana	Attorney General	Liz Murrill	October 14, 2023	Open	Elected
Louisiana	Treasurer	John Fleming	October 14, 2023	Open	Elected
Louisiana	Secretary of State	Nancy Landry	October 14, 2023	Open	Elected

==== 2024 gubernatorial elections ====
State	Candidate	Result
Indiana	Mike Braun	Elected
Missouri	Mike Kehoe	Elected
North Carolina	Mark Robinson	Lost general
North Dakota	Kelly Armstrong	Elected
West Virginia	Patrick Morrisey	Elected

==== 2024 lieutenant gubernatorial elections ====
State	Candidate	Result
Indiana	Julie McGuire	Lost convention

==== 2024 Senate elections ====
State	Candidate	Result
Arizona	Kari Lake	Lost general
Florida	Rick Scott	Elected
Indiana	Jim Banks	Elected
Maryland	Larry Hogan	Lost general
Michigan	Mike Rogers	Lost general
Mississippi	Roger Wicker	Elected
Missouri	Josh Hawley	Elected
Montana	Tim Sheehy	Elected
Nebraska	Deb Fischer	Elected
Nebraska (special)	Pete Ricketts	Elected
Nevada	Sam Brown	Lost general
New Jersey	Christine Serrano Glassner	Lost primary
(New York (state)) New York	Mike Sapraicone	Lost general
North Dakota	Kevin Cramer	Elected
Ohio	Bernie Moreno	Elected
Pennsylvania	Dave McCormick	Elected
Tennessee	Marsha Blackburn	Elected
Texas	Ted Cruz	Elected
Utah	Trent Staggs	Lost primary
Virginia	Hung Cao	Lost general
West Virginia	Jim Justice	Elected
Wisconsin	Eric Hovde	Lost general
Wyoming	John Barrasso	Elected

==== 2024 House elections ====
District	Candidate	Primary date	Seat status	Primary result
(Alabama) AL-03	Mike Rogers	March 5, 2024	Incumbent	Elected
(Alabama) AL-04	Robert Aderholt	March 5, 2024	Incumbent	Elected
(Alabama) AL-05	Dale Strong	March 5, 2024	Incumbent	Elected
(Alabama) AL-06	Gary Palmer	March 5, 2024	Incumbent	Elected
(California) CA-20	Vince Fong	March 5, 2024	Open seat	Elected
(North Carolina) NC-05	Virginia Foxx	March 5, 2024	Incumbent	Elected
(North Carolina) NC-06	Addison McDowell	March 5, 2024	Open seat	Elected
(North Carolina) NC-14	Tim Moore	March 5, 2024	Open seat	Elected
(Texas) TX-03	Keith Self	March 5, 2024	Incumbent	Elected
(Texas) TX-04	Pat Fallon	March 5, 2024	Incumbent	Elected
(Texas) TX-05	Lance Gooden	March 5, 2024	Incumbent	Elected
(Texas) TX-11	August Pfluger	March 5, 2024	Incumbent	Elected
(Texas) TX-13	Ronny Jackson	March 5, 2024	Incumbent	Elected
(Texas) TX-14	Randy Weber	March 5, 2024	Incumbent	Elected
(Texas) TX-15	Monica De La Cruz	March 5, 2024	Incumbent	Elected
(Texas) TX-17	Pete Sessions	March 5, 2024	Incumbent	Elected
(Texas) TX-19	Jodey Arrington	March 5, 2024	Incumbent	Elected
(Texas) TX-22	Troy Nehls	March 5, 2024	Incumbent	Elected
(Texas) TX-24	Beth Van Duyne	March 5, 2024	Incumbent	Elected
(Texas) TX-25	Roger Williams	March 5, 2024	Incumbent	Elected
(Texas) TX-26	Brandon Gill	March 5, 2024	Open seat	Elected
(Texas) TX-31	John Carter	March 5, 2024	Incumbent	Elected
(Texas) TX-34	Mayra Flores	March 5, 2024	Challenger	Lost general
(Texas) TX-36	Brian Babin	March 5, 2024	Incumbent	Elected
(Texas) TX-38	Wesley Hunt	March 5, 2024	Incumbent	Elected
(Mississippi) MS-04	Mike Ezell	March 12, 2024	Incumbent	Elected
(Montana) MT-01	Ryan Zinke	June 4, 2024	Incumbent	Elected
(Montana) MT-02	Troy Downing	June 4, 2024	Open seat	Elected
(Maine) ME-02	Austin Theriault	June 11, 2024	Challenger	Lost general
(South Carolina) SC-01	Nancy Mace	June 11, 2024	Incumbent	Elected
(South Carolina) SC-04	William Timmons	June 11, 2024	Incumbent	Elected
(Virginia) VA-02	Jen Kiggans	June 18, 2024	Incumbent	Elected
(Colorado) CO-04	Lauren Boebert	June 25, 2024	Incumbent	Elected
(New York (state)) NY-04	Anthony D'Esposito	June 25, 2024	Incumbent	Lost general
(New York (state)) NY-22	Brandon Williams	June 25, 2024	Incumbent	Lost general
(New York (state)) NY-24	Claudia Tenney	June 25, 2024	Incumbent	Elected
(Arizona) AZ-08	Abraham Hamadeh	July 30, 2024	Open seat	Elected
(Tennessee) TN-05	Andy Ogles	August 1, 2024	Incumbent	Elected
(Tennessee) TN-07	Mark Green	August 1, 2024	Incumbent	Elected
(Alaska) AK-AL	Nancy Dahlstrom	August 20, 2024	Challenger	Withdrew
(Alaska) AK-AL	Nick Begich	August 20, 2024	Challenger	Elected
(Florida) FL-07	Cory Mills	August 20, 2024	Incumbent	Elected
(Florida) FL-11	Daniel Webster	August 20, 2024	Incumbent	Elected
(Florida) FL-22	Dan Franzese	August 20, 2024	Challenger	Lost general
(Wyoming) WY-AL	Harriet Hageman	August 20, 2024	Incumbent	Elected
(Louisiana) LA-01	Steve Scalise	November 5, 2024	Incumbent	Elected
(Louisiana) LA-03	Clay Higgins	November 5, 2024	Incumbent	Elected
(Louisiana) LA-04	Mike Johnson	November 5, 2024	Incumbent	Elected
(Louisiana) LA-05	Julia Letlow	November 5, 2024	Incumbent	Elected

==== 2024 state executive elections ====
State	Office	Candidate	Primary date	Seat status	Primary result
North Carolina	Attorney General	Dan Bishop	March 5, 2024	Open seat	Lost election

==== 2024 state legislative elections ====
State	Office	Candidate	Result
Texas	Barry Wernick	Texas State Representative	Lost general
Texas	Caroline Fairly	Texas State Representative	Elected
Texas	John T. Smithee	Texas State Representative	Elected
Texas	Don McLaughlin	Texas State Representative	Elected
Texas	Stormy Bradley	Texas State Representative	Lost general
Texas	Liz Case	Texas State Representative	Lost general
Texas	Mike Olcott	Texas State Representative	Elected
Texas	Helen Kerwin	Texas State Representative	Elected
Texas	Hillary Hickland	Texas State Representative	Elected
Texas	Wesley Virdell	Texas State Representative	Elected
Texas	Alan Schoolcraft	Texas State Representative	Elected
Texas	Gary Gates	Texas State Representative	Elected
Texas	David Covey	Texas State Representative	Lost general
Texas	Janis Holt	Texas State Representative	Elected
Texas	Steve Toth	Texas State Representative	Elected
Texas	Brent Money	Texas State Representative	Elected
Texas	Brent Hagenbuch	Texas State Senator	Elected

==== 2025 Speaker of the House of Representatives election ====
Election	Candidate	Result
(United States) 2025	Mike Johnson	Elected

=== Second term as president ===
==== 2025 state judicial elections ====
State	Candidate	Primary date	Seat status	Result
Wisconsin	Brad Schimel	April 1, 2025	Open	Lost general

==== 2025 House special elections ====
District	Candidate	Result
(Florida) FL-01	Jimmy Patronis	Elected
(Florida) FL-06	Randy Fine	Elected
(Tennessee) TN-07	Matt Van Epps	Elected

==== 2025 gubernatorial elections ====
State	Candidate	Primary date	Seat status	Result
New Jersey	Jack Ciattarelli	June 10, 2025	Open	Lost general
Virginia	Winsome Earle-Sears	June 17, 2025	Open	Lost general

==== 2025 state executive elections ====
State	Office	Candidate	Primary date	Seat status	Primary result
Virginia	Attorney General	Jason Miyares	June 28, 2025	Incumbent	Lost general

==== 2025 mayoral elections ====
City	Candidate	Primary date	Seat status	Result
New York City	Andrew Cuomo (Fight and Deliver party)	June 24, 2025	Challenger	Lost general
Miami	Emilio T. Gonzalez	November 4, 2025	Open	Lost general

==== 2025 county executive elections ====
County	Candidate	Primary date	Seat status	Result
(Nassau County, New York) Nassau County	Bruce Blakeman	November 4, 2025	Incumbent	Elected

==== 2025-26 state legislative elections ====
District	Candidate	Primary date	Seat status	Result
(Texas) TX SD-09	Leigh Wambsganss	November 4, 2025	Open	Lost runoff

==== 2026 House special elections ====
District	Candidate	Result
(Georgia (U.S. state)) GA-14	Clay Fuller	Elected
(California) CA-01	James Gallagher	Elected

==== 2026 gubernatorial elections ====
State	Candidate	Primary date	Seat status	Result
Alabama	Tommy Tuberville	May 19, 2026	Open Seat	Elected
Alaska	Bernadette Wilson	August 18, 2026	Open Seat	Lost general
Arizona	~~Karrin Taylor Robson~~ (withdrew)	July 21, 2026	Challenger	Withdrew
Arizona	Andy Biggs (co-endorsement with Robson)	July 21, 2026	Challenger	Lost general
Arkansas	Sarah Huckabee Sanders	March 3, 2026	Incumbent	Elected
California	Steve Hilton	June 2, 2026	Open Seat	Lost general
Florida	Byron Donalds	August 18, 2026	Open Seat	Elected
(Georgia (U.S. state)) Georgia	Burt Jones	June 16, 2026	Open Seat	Lost Primary
(Georgia (U.S. state)) Georgia	Rick Jackson	June 16, 2026	Open Seat	Lost general
Idaho	Brad Little	May 19, 2026	Incumbent	Elected
Iowa	Randy Feenstra	June 2, 2026	Open Seat	Lost Primary
Iowa	Zach Lahn	June 2, 2026	Open Seat	Lost general
Kansas	Ty Masterson	August 4, 2026	Open Seat	Lost general
Michigan	John James	August 4, 2026	Open Seat	Lost general
Minnesota	Mike Lindell	August 11, 2026	Open Seat	Lost Primary
Nebraska	Jim Pillen	May 12, 2026	Incumbent	Elected
Nevada	Joe Lombardo	June 9, 2026	Incumbent	Lost general
(New York (state)) New York	Bruce Blakeman	June 23, 2026	Challenger	Lost general
Ohio	Vivek Ramaswamy	May 5, 2026	Open Seat	Lost general
Oklahoma	Mike Mazzei	June 16, 2026	Open Seat	Elected
Pennsylvania	~~Dan Meuser~~ (declined to run)	May 19, 2026	Challenger	Declined
Pennsylvania	Stacy Garrity	May 19, 2026	Challenger	Lost general
South Carolina	Pamela Evette	June 9, 2026	Open Seat	Lost Primary
South Carolina	Alan Wilson (co-endorsement with Evette in the Runoff)	June 9, 2026	Open Seat	Elected
South Dakota	Larry Rhoden	June 2, 2026	Incumbent	Elected
Tennessee	Marsha Blackburn	August 6, 2026	Open Seat	Elected
Texas	Greg Abbott	March 3, 2026	Incumbent	Lost general
Wisconsin	Tom Tiffany	August 11, 2026	Open Seat	Lost general
Wyoming	Megan Degenfelder	August 18, 2026	Open Seat	Lost Primary

==== 2026 state executive elections ====
State	Office	Candidate	Primary date	Seat status	Primary result
Alabama	Lieutenant Governor	John Wahl	June 16, 2026	Open	Elected
Florida	Attorney General	James Uthmeier	August 18, 2026	Incumbent	Elected
Florida	Chief Financial Officer	~~Joe Gruters~~ (Withdrew)	August 18, 2026	Challenger	Withdrew
Florida	Commissioner of Agriculture	Wilton Simpson	August 18, 2026	Incumbent	Elected
Idaho	Lieutenant Governor	Scott Bedke	May 19, 2026	Incumbent	Elected
Nebraska	Attorney General	Mike Hilgers	May 12, 2026	Incumbent	Elected
Nevada	Lieutenant Governor	Stavros Anthony	June 9, 2026	Incumbent	Lost general
Nevada	Attorney General	Adriana Guzmán Fralick	June 9, 2026	Open Seat	Lost general
Oklahoma	Lieutenant Governor	T. W. Shannon	June 16, 2026	Open Seat	Elected
South Carolina	Agriculture Commissioner	Cody Simpson	June 9, 2026	Open Seat	Elected
Texas	Lieutenant Governor	Dan Patrick	March 3, 2026	Incumbent	Lost general
Texas	Comptroller	Don Huffines	March 3, 2026	Challenger	Lost general
Texas	General Land Commissioner	Dawn Buckingham	March 3, 2026	Incumbent	Lost general
Texas	Agriculture Commissioner	Sid Miller	March 3, 2026	Incumbent	Lost primary

==== 2026 Senate elections ====
State	Candidate	Primary date	Seat status	Result
Alabama	Barry Moore	June 16, 2026	Open Seat	Elected
Alaska	Dan Sullivan	August 18, 2026	Incumbent	Lost general
Arkansas	Tom Cotton	March 3, 2026	Incumbent	Elected
Florida	Ashley Moody	August 18, 2026	Incumbent	Elected
(Georgia (U.S. state)) Georgia	Mike Collins	May 19, 2026	Challenger	Lost general
Idaho	Jim Risch	May 19, 2026	Incumbent	Elected
Iowa	Ashley Hinson	June 2, 2026	Open Seat	Lost general
Kansas	Roger Marshall	August 4, 2026	Incumbent	Lost general
Kentucky	Andy Barr	May 19, 2026	Open Seat	Elected
Louisiana	Julia Letlow	June 27, 2026	Challenger	Elected
Michigan	Mike Rogers	August 4, 2026	Open Seat	Lost general
Minnesota	Michele Tafoya	August 11, 2026	Open Seat	Lost general
Mississippi	Cindy Hyde-Smith	March 10, 2026	Incumbent	Lost general
Montana	~~Steve Daines~~ (withdrew)	June 2, 2026	Incumbent	Withdrew
Montana	Kurt Alme	June 2, 2026	Open Seat	Elected
Nebraska	Pete Ricketts	May 12, 2026	Incumbent	Elected
New Hampshire	John E. Sununu	September 8, 2026	Open Seat	Lost general
North Carolina	Michael Whatley	March 3, 2026	Open Seat	Lost general
Ohio	Jon Husted	May 5, 2026	Incumbent	Lost general
Oklahoma	~~Markwayne Mullin~~ (resigned to become DHS Secretary)	June 16, 2026	Incumbent	Resigned
Oklahoma	Kevin Hern	June 16, 2026	Open Seat	Elected
South Carolina	~~Lindsey Graham~~ (died)	June 9, 2026	Incumbent	Won Primary but later died
South Carolina	Darline Graham	August 11, 2026 (Note: Special primary)	Incumbent	Lost general
South Dakota	Mike Rounds	June 2, 2026	Incumbent	Elected
Tennessee	Bill Hagerty	August 6, 2026	Incumbent	Elected
Texas	Ken Paxton	May 26, 2026	Challenger	Lost general
West Virginia	Shelley Moore Capito	May 12, 2026	Incumbent	Elected
Wyoming	~~Cynthia Lummis~~ (declined to run)	August 18, 2026	Incumbent	Declined
Wyoming	Harriet Hageman	August 18, 2026	Open Seat	Elected

==== 2026 House elections ====
District	Candidate	Primary date	Seat status	Result
(Alabama) AL-01	Jerry Carl	August 11, 2026	Open Seat	Elected
(Alabama) AL-02	Rhett Marques	August 11, 2026	Challenger	Lost general
(Alabama) AL-03	Mike Rogers	May 19, 2026	Incumbent	Elected
(Alabama) AL-04	Robert Aderholt	May 19, 2026	Incumbent	Elected
(Alabama) AL-05	Dale Strong	May 19, 2026	Incumbent	Elected
(Alabama) AL-06	Gary Palmer	May 19, 2026	Incumbent	Elected
(Alaska) AK-AL	Nick Begich	August 18, 2026	Incumbent	Elected
(Arizona) AZ-01	~~Gina Swoboda~~ (withdrew)	July 21, 2026	Open Seat	Withdrew
(Arizona) AZ-01	Jay Feely (co-endorsement with Swoboda)	July 21, 2026	Open Seat	Lost general
(Arizona) AZ-02	Eli Crane	July 21, 2026	Incumbent	Elected
(Arizona) AZ-05	Mark Lamb	July 21, 2026	Open Seat	Elected
(Arizona) AZ-06	Juan Ciscomani	July 21, 2026	Incumbent	Lost general
(Arizona) AZ-08	Abraham Hamadeh	July 21, 2026	Incumbent	Elected
(Arizona) AZ-09	Paul Gosar	July 21, 2026	Incumbent	Elected
(Arkansas) AR-01	Rick Crawford	March 3, 2026	Incumbent	Elected
(Arkansas) AR-02	French Hill	March 3, 2026	Incumbent	Elected
(Arkansas) AR-03	Steve Womack	March 3, 2026	Incumbent	Elected
(Arkansas) AR-04	Bruce Westerman	March 3, 2026	Incumbent	Elected
(California) CA-01	James Gallagher	June 2, 2026	Incumbent	Lost general
(California) CA-05	Tom McClintock	June 2, 2026	Incumbent	Elected
(California) CA-13	Kevin Lincoln	June 2, 2026	Challenger	Lost general
(California) CA-20	Vince Fong	June 2, 2026	Incumbent	Elected
(California) CA-23	Jay Obernolte	June 2, 2026	Incumbent	TBA
(California) CA-48	~~Darrell Issa~~ (withdrew)	June 2, 2026	Incumbent	Withdrew
(California) CA-48	Jim Desmond	June 2, 2026	Open Seat	Lost general
(Colorado) CO-03	Jeff Hurd (re-endorsed)	June 30, 2026	Incumbent	Elected
(Colorado) CO-03	~~Hope Scheppelman~~ (withdrew)	June 30, 2026	Challenger	Withdrew
(Colorado) CO-04	Lauren Boebert	June 30, 2026	Incumbent	Lost general
(Colorado) CO-05	Jeff Crank	June 30, 2026	Incumbent	Lost general
(Colorado) CO-08	Gabe Evans	June 30, 2026	Incumbent	Lost general
(Florida) FL-01	Jimmy Patronis	August 18, 2026	Incumbent	Elected
(Florida) FL-02	~~Neal Dunn~~ (declined to run)	August 18, 2026	Incumbent	Declined
(Florida) FL-02	Austin Rogers	August 18, 2026	Open Seat	Elected
(Florida) FL-03	Kat Cammack	August 18, 2026	Incumbent	Elected
(Florida) FL-04	Aaron Bean	August 18, 2026	Incumbent	Elected
(Florida) FL-05	John Rutherford	August 18, 2026	Incumbent	Elected
(Florida) FL-06	Randy Fine	August 18, 2026	Incumbent	Elected
(Florida) FL-07	Cory Mills	August 18, 2026	Incumbent	Lost Primary
(Florida) FL-07	Ryan Elijah	August 18, 2026	Open Seat	Elected
(Florida) FL-08	Mike Haridopolos	August 18, 2026	Incumbent	Elected
(Florida) FL-09	Dan Green	August 18, 2026	Challenger	Lost general
(Florida) FL-11	~~Daniel Webster~~ (withdrew)	August 18, 2026	Incumbent	Withdrew
(Florida) FL-11	Joe Strada	August 18, 2026	Open Seat	Elected
(Florida) FL-12	Gus Bilirakis	August 18, 2026	Incumbent	Elected
(Florida) FL-13	Anna Paulina Luna	August 18, 2026	Incumbent	Elected
(Florida) FL-14	Mike Beltran	August 18, 2026	Challenger	Lost general
(Florida) FL-15	Laurel Lee	August 18, 2026	Incumbent	Elected
(Florida) FL-16	~~Vern Buchanan~~ (declined to run)	August 18, 2026	Incumbent	Declined
(Florida) FL-16	Sydney Gruters	August 18, 2026	Open Seat	Elected
(Florida) FL-17	Greg Steube	August 18, 2026	Incumbent	Elected
(Florida) FL-18	Scott Franklin	August 18, 2026	Incumbent	Elected
(Florida) FL-19	Catalina Lauf	August 18, 2026	Open Seat	Lost Primary
(Florida) FL-19	Jim Schwartzel	August 18, 2026	Open Seat	Elected
(Florida) FL-21	Brian Mast	August 18, 2026	Incumbent	Elected
(Florida) FL-22	Casey Askar	August 18, 2026	Open Seat	Lost general
(Florida) FL-25	Scott Singer	August 18, 2026	Open Seat	Lost general
(Florida) FL-26	Mario Díaz-Balart	August 18, 2026	Incumbent	Elected
(Florida) FL-27	~~Maria Elvira Salazar~~ (endorsement rescinded)	August 18, 2026	Incumbent	Elected
(Florida) FL-28	Carlos Giménez	August 18, 2026	Incumbent	Elected
(Georgia (U.S. state)) GA-01	Jim Kingston	May 19, 2026	Open Seat	Elected
(Georgia (U.S. state)) GA-03	Brian Jack	May 19, 2026	Incumbent	Elected
(Georgia (U.S. state)) GA-07	Rich McCormick	May 19, 2026	Incumbent	Elected
(Georgia (U.S. state)) GA-08	Austin Scott	May 19, 2026	Incumbent	Elected
(Georgia (U.S. state)) GA-09	Andrew Clyde	May 19, 2026	Incumbent	Elected
(Georgia (U.S. state)) GA-10	Houston Gaines	May 19, 2026	Open Seat	Elected
(Georgia (U.S. state)) GA-11	~~Barry Loudermilk~~ (withdrew)	May 19, 2026	Incumbent	Withdrew
(Georgia (U.S. state)) GA-12	Rick Allen	May 19, 2026	Incumbent	Elected
(Georgia (U.S. state)) GA-14	~~Marjorie Taylor Greene~~ (endorsement rescinded, resigned)	May 19, 2026	Incumbent	Resigned
(Georgia (U.S. state)) GA-14	Clay Fuller	May 19, 2026	Open Seat	Elected
(Idaho) ID-01	Russ Fulcher	May 19, 2026	Incumbent	Elected
(Idaho) ID-02	Mike Simpson	May 19, 2026	Incumbent	Elected
(Illinois) IL-12	Mike Bost	March 17, 2026	Incumbent	Elected
(Illinois) IL-15	Mary Miller	March 17, 2026	Incumbent	Elected
(Illinois) IL-16	Darin LaHood	March 17, 2026	Incumbent	Elected
(Indiana) IN-02	Rudy Yakym	May 5, 2026	Incumbent	Elected
(Indiana) IN-03	Marlin Stutzman	May 5, 2026	Incumbent	Elected
(Indiana) IN-04	Jim Baird	May 5, 2026	Incumbent	Elected
(Indiana) IN-05	Victoria Spartz	May 5, 2026	Incumbent	Lost general
(Indiana) IN-06	Jefferson Shreve	May 5, 2026	Incumbent	Elected
(Indiana) IN-08	Mark Messmer	May 5, 2026	Incumbent	Elected
(Indiana) IN-09	Erin Houchin	May 5, 2026	Incumbent	Elected
(Iowa) IA-01	Mariannette Miller-Meeks	June 2, 2026	Incumbent	Lost general
(Iowa) IA-02	Joe Mitchell	June 2, 2026	Open Seat	Lost general
(Iowa) IA-03	Zach Nunn	June 2, 2026	Incumbent	Lost general
(Iowa) IA-04	Chris McGowan	June 2, 2026	Open Seat	Elected
(Kansas) KS-01	Tracey Mann	August 4, 2026	Incumbent	Elected
(Kansas) KS-02	Derek Schmidt	August 4, 2026	Incumbent	Elected
(Kansas) KS-04	Ron Estes	August 4, 2026	Incumbent	Elected
(Kentucky) KY-01	James Comer	May 19, 2026	Incumbent	Elected
(Kentucky) KY-02	Brett Guthrie	May 19, 2026	Incumbent	Elected
(Kentucky) KY-04	Ed Gallrein	May 19, 2026	Challenger	Elected
(Kentucky) KY-05	Hal Rogers	May 19, 2026	Incumbent	Elected
(Kentucky) KY-06	Ralph Alvarado	May 19, 2026	Open Seat	Lost general
(Louisiana) LA-01	Steve Scalise	July 15, 2026	Incumbent	Elected
(Louisiana) LA-03	Clay Higgins	July 15, 2026	Incumbent	Elected
(Louisiana) LA-04	Mike Johnson	July 15, 2026	Incumbent	Elected
(Louisiana) LA-05	Blake Miguez	July 15, 2026	Open Seat	TBA
(Maine) ME-02	Paul LePage	June 9, 2026	Open Seat	Elected
(Michigan) MI-01	Jack Bergman	August 4, 2026	Incumbent	Elected
(Michigan) MI-02	John Moolenaar	August 4, 2026	Incumbent	Elected
(Michigan) MI-04	Bill Huizenga	August 4, 2026	Incumbent	Lost general
(Michigan) MI-05	Tim Walberg	August 4, 2026	Incumbent	Elected
(Michigan) MI-07	Tom Barrett	August 4, 2026	Incumbent	Lost general
(Michigan) MI-08	Amir Hassan	August 4, 2026	Challenger	Lost Primary
(Michigan) MI-09	Lisa McClain	August 4, 2026	Incumbent	Elected
(Michigan) MI-10	Mike Bouchard Jr.	August 4, 2026	Open Seat	Lost general
(Minnesota) MN-01	Brad Finstad	August 11, 2026	Incumbent	TBA
(Minnesota) MN-06	Tom Emmer	August 11, 2026	Incumbent	Elected
(Minnesota) MN-07	Michelle Fischbach	August 11, 2026	Incumbent	Elected
(Minnesota) MN-08	Pete Stauber	August 11, 2026	Incumbent	Elected
(Mississippi) MS-01	Trent Kelly	March 10, 2026	Incumbent	Elected
(Mississippi) MS-03	Michael Guest	March 10, 2026	Incumbent	Elected
(Mississippi) MS-04	Mike Ezell	March 10, 2026	Incumbent	Elected
(Missouri) MO-02	Ann Wagner	August 4, 2026	Incumbent	Lost general
(Missouri) MO-03	Bob Onder	August 4, 2026	Incumbent	Elected
(Missouri) MO-04	Mark Alford	August 4, 2026	Incumbent	Elected
(Missouri) MO-05	Rick Brattin	August 4, 2026	Challenger	Lost general
(Missouri) MO-07	Eric Burlison	August 4, 2026	Incumbent	Elected
(Missouri) MO-08	Jason Smith	August 4, 2026	Incumbent	Elected
(Montana) MT-01	~~Ryan Zinke~~ (declined to run)	June 2, 2026	Incumbent	Declined
(Montana) MT-01	Aaron Flint	June 2, 2026	Open Seat	Lost general
(Montana) MT-02	Troy Downing	June 2, 2026	Incumbent	Elected
(Nebraska) NE-01	Mike Flood	May 12, 2026	Incumbent	Elected
(Nebraska) NE-02	Brinker Harding	May 12, 2026	Open Seat	Lost general
(Nebraska) NE-03	Adrian Smith	May 12, 2026	Incumbent	Elected
(Nevada) NV-01	Carrie Buck	June 9, 2026	Challenger	Lost general
(Nevada) NV-02	~~Mark Amodei~~ (withdrew)	June 9, 2026	Incumbent	Withdrew
(Nevada) NV-02	David Flippo	June 9, 2026	Open Seat	Lost general
(Nevada) NV-03	Martin O'Donnell	June 9, 2026	Challenger	Lost general
(New Jersey) NJ-02	Jeff Van Drew	June 2, 2026	Incumbent	Lost general
(New Jersey) NJ-04	Chris Smith	June 2, 2026	Incumbent	Elected
(New Jersey) NJ-07	Thomas Kean Jr.	June 2, 2026	Incumbent	Lost general
(New Mexico) NM-02	Greg Cunningham	June 2, 2026	Challenger	Lost general
(New York (state)) NY-01	Nick LaLota	June 23, 2026	Incumbent	Elected
(New York (state)) NY-02	Andrew Garbarino	June 23, 2026	Incumbent	Elected
(New York (state)) NY-03	Mike LiPetri	June 23, 2026	Challenger	Lost general
(New York (state)) NY-04	Jeanine Driscoll	June 23, 2026	Challenger	Lost general
(New York (state)) NY-11	Nicole Malliotakis	June 23, 2026	Incumbent	Elected
(New York (state)) NY-17	Mike Lawler	June 23, 2026	Incumbent	Lost general
(New York (state)) NY-19	Peter Oberacker	June 23, 2026	Challenger	Lost general
(New York (state)) NY-21	Anthony Constantino	June 23, 2026	Open Seat	Elected
(New York (state)) NY-22	Kailee Buller	June 23, 2026	Challenger	Lost general
(New York (state)) NY-23	Nick Langworthy	June 23, 2026	Incumbent	Elected
(New York (state)) NY-24	Claudia Tenney	June 23, 2026	Incumbent	Elected
(North Carolina) NC-01	Laurie Buckhout	March 3, 2026	Challenger	Lost general
(North Carolina) NC-03	Greg Murphy	March 3, 2026	Incumbent	TBA
(North Carolina) NC-05	Virginia Foxx	March 3, 2026	Incumbent	TBA
(North Carolina) NC-06	Addison McDowell	March 3, 2026	Incumbent	Lost general
(North Carolina) NC-07	David Rouzer	March 3, 2026	Incumbent	TBA
(North Carolina) NC-08	Mark Harris	March 3, 2026	Incumbent	Elected
(North Carolina) NC-09	Richard Hudson	March 3, 2026	Incumbent	Lost general
(North Carolina) NC-10	Pat Harrigan	March 3, 2026	Incumbent	Elected
(North Carolina) NC-11	~~Chuck Edwards~~ (withdrew)	March 3, 2026	Incumbent	Withdrew
(North Carolina) NC-11	Jennifer Balkcom		Open Seat	Lost general
(North Carolina) NC-13	Brad Knott	March 3, 2026	Incumbent	Lost general
(North Carolina) NC-14	Tim Moore	March 3, 2026	Incumbent	Lost general
(North Dakota) ND-AL	Julie Fedorchak	June 9, 2026	Incumbent	Elected
(Ohio) OH-01	Eric Conroy	May 5, 2026	Challenger	Lost general
(Ohio) OH-02	David Taylor	May 5, 2026	Incumbent	Elected
(Ohio) OH-04	Jim Jordan	May 5, 2026	Incumbent	Elected
(Ohio) OH-05	Bob Latta	May 5, 2026	Incumbent	Elected
(Ohio) OH-06	Michael Rulli	May 5, 2026	Incumbent	Elected
(Ohio) OH-07	Max Miller	May 5, 2026	Incumbent	Lost general
(Ohio) OH-08	Warren Davidson	May 5, 2026	Incumbent	Elected
(Ohio) OH-09	Derek Merrin	May 5, 2026	Challenger	Lost general
(Ohio) OH-10	Mike Turner	May 5, 2026	Incumbent	Lost general
(Ohio) OH-12	Troy Balderson	May 5, 2026	Incumbent	Elected
(Ohio) OH-14	David Joyce	May 5, 2026	Incumbent	Elected
(Ohio) OH-15	Mike Carey	May 5, 2026	Incumbent	Lost general
(Oklahoma) OK-01	~~Kevin Hern~~ (withdrew to run for the senate)	June 16, 2026	Incumbent	Withdrew
(Oklahoma) OK-01	~~Jackson Lahmeyer~~ (endorsement rescinded)	June 16, 2026	Open Seat	Withdrew before Runoff
(Oklahoma) OK-01	Mark Tedford	June 16, 2026	Open Seat	Elected
(Oklahoma) OK-02	Josh Brecheen	June 16, 2026	Incumbent	Elected
(Oklahoma) OK-03	Frank Lucas	June 16, 2026	Incumbent	Elected
(Oklahoma) OK-04	Tom Cole	June 16, 2026	Incumbent	Elected
(Oklahoma) OK-05	Stephanie Bice	June 16, 2026	Incumbent	Elected
(Oregon) OR-02	Cliff Bentz	May 19, 2026	Incumbent	Elected
(Pennsylvania) PA-07	Ryan Mackenzie	May 19, 2026	Incumbent	Lost general
(Pennsylvania) PA-08	Rob Bresnahan	May 19, 2026	Incumbent	Lost general
(Pennsylvania) PA-09	Dan Meuser	May 19, 2026	Incumbent	Elected
(Pennsylvania) PA-10	Scott Perry	May 19, 2026	Incumbent	Lost general
(Pennsylvania) PA-11	Lloyd Smucker	May 19, 2026	Incumbent	Elected
(Pennsylvania) PA-13	John Joyce	May 19, 2026	Incumbent	Elected
(Pennsylvania) PA-14	Guy Reschenthaler	May 19, 2026	Incumbent	Elected
(Pennsylvania) PA-15	Glenn Thompson	May 19, 2026	Incumbent	Elected
(Pennsylvania) PA-16	Mike Kelly	May 19, 2026	Incumbent	Elected
(South Carolina) SC-01	Jenny Costa Honeycutt	June 9, 2026	Open Seat	Lost general
(South Carolina) SC-02	Joe Wilson	June 9, 2026	Incumbent	Elected
(South Carolina) SC-03	Sheri Biggs	June 9, 2026	Incumbent	Elected
(South Carolina) SC-04	William Timmons	June 9, 2026	Incumbent	Elected
(South Carolina) SC-07	Russell Fry	June 9, 2026	Incumbent	Elected
(South Dakota) SD-AL	Marty Jackley	June 2, 2026	Open Seat	Elected
(Tennessee) TN-01	Diana Harshbarger	August 6, 2026	Incumbent	Elected
(Tennessee) TN-02	Tim Burchett	August 6, 2026	Incumbent	Elected
(Tennessee) TN-03	Chuck Fleischmann	August 6, 2026	Incumbent	Elected
(Tennessee) TN-04	Scott DesJarlais	August 6, 2026	Incumbent	TBA
(Tennessee) TN-05	Andy Ogles	August 6, 2026	Incumbent	Lost Primary
(Tennessee) TN-05	Charlie Hatcher	August 6, 2026	Challenger	Elected
(Tennessee) TN-07	Matt Van Epps	August 6, 2026	Incumbent	Elected
(Tennessee) TN-08	David Kustoff	August 6, 2026	Incumbent	Elected
(Tennessee) TN-09	Brent Taylor	August 6, 2026	Open Seat	Elected
(Texas) TX-01	Nathaniel Moran	March 3, 2026	Incumbent	Elected
(Texas) TX-02	Steve Toth	March 3, 2026	Challenger	Elected
(Texas) TX-03	Keith Self	March 3, 2026	Incumbent	Elected
(Texas) TX-04	Pat Fallon	March 3, 2026	Incumbent	Elected
(Texas) TX-05	Lance Gooden	March 3, 2026	Incumbent	Elected
(Texas) TX-06	Jake Ellzey	March 3, 2026	Incumbent	Elected
(Texas) TX-08	Jessica Steinmann	March 3, 2026	Open Seat	Elected
(Texas) TX-09	Alex Mealer	May 26, 2026	Open Seat	Lost general
(Texas) TX-10	Chris Gober	March 3, 2026	Open Seat	Elected
(Texas) TX-11	August Pfluger	March 3, 2026	Incumbent	Elected
(Texas) TX-12	Craig Goldman	March 3, 2026	Incumbent	Elected
(Texas) TX-13	Ronny Jackson	March 3, 2026	Incumbent	Elected
(Texas) TX-14	Randy Weber	March 3, 2026	Incumbent	Elected
(Texas) TX-15	Monica De La Cruz	March 3, 2026	Incumbent	Lost general
(Texas) TX-17	Pete Sessions	March 3, 2026	Incumbent	Elected
(Texas) TX-19	~~Jodey Arrington~~ (withdrew)	March 3, 2026	Incumbent	Withdrew
(Texas) TX-21	Mark Teixeira	March 3, 2026	Open Seat	Elected
(Texas) TX-22	~~Troy Nehls~~ (declined to run)	March 3, 2026	Incumbent	Declined
(Texas) TX-22	Trever Nehls	March 3, 2026	Open Seat	Elected
(Texas) TX-23	~~Tony Gonzales~~ (withdrew before Runoff, resigned)	March 3, 2026	Incumbent	Resigned
(Texas) TX-23	Brandon Herrera	May 26, 2026	Challenger	Lost general
(Texas) TX-24	Beth Van Duyne	March 3, 2026	Incumbent	Elected
(Texas) TX-25	Roger Williams	March 3, 2026	Incumbent	Elected
(Texas) TX-26	Brandon Gill	March 3, 2026	Incumbent	Elected
(Texas) TX-27	Michael Cloud	March 3, 2026	Incumbent	Elected
(Texas) TX-28	Tano Tijerina	March 3, 2026	Challenger	Lost general
(Texas) TX-31	John Carter	March 3, 2026	Incumbent	Elected
(Texas) TX-32	Jace Yarbrough	March 3, 2026	Open Seat	Elected
(Texas) TX-34	Eric Flores	March 3, 2026	Challenger	Lost general
(Texas) TX-35	Carlos De La Cruz	May 26, 2026	Open Seat	Lost general
(Texas) TX-36	Brian Babin	March 3, 2026	Incumbent	Elected
(Texas) TX-38	Jon Bonck	May 26, 2026	Open Seat	Elected
(Utah) UT-02	Blake Moore	June 23, 2026	Incumbent	Elected
(Utah) UT-03	Celeste Maloy	June 23, 2026	Incumbent	Elected
(Utah) UT-04	Mike Kennedy	June 23, 2026	Incumbent	Elected
(Virginia) VA-01	Rob Wittman	June 16, 2026	Incumbent	Lost general
(Virginia) VA-02	Jen Kiggans	June 16, 2026	Incumbent	Lost general
(Virginia) VA-05	John McGuire	June 16, 2026	Incumbent	Elected
(Virginia) VA-06	Ben Cline	June 16, 2026	Incumbent	Elected
(Virginia) VA-09	Morgan Griffith	June 16, 2026	Incumbent	Elected
(Washington (state)) WA-03	John Braun	August 4, 2026	Challenger	Lost general
(Washington (state)) WA-04	Amanda McKinney	August 4, 2026	Open Seat	Elected
(Washington (state)) WA-05	Michael Baumgartner	August 4, 2026	Incumbent	Elected
(West Virginia) WV-01	Carol Miller	May 12, 2026	Incumbent	Elected
(West Virginia) WV-02	Riley Moore	May 12, 2026	Incumbent	Elected
(Wisconsin) WI-01	Bryan Steil	August 11, 2026	Incumbent	Lost general
(Wisconsin) WI-03	Derrick Van Orden	August 11, 2026	Incumbent	Lost general
(Wisconsin) WI-05	Scott Fitzgerald	August 11, 2026	Incumbent	Elected
(Wisconsin) WI-06	Glenn Grothman	August 11, 2026	Incumbent	Elected
(Wisconsin) WI-07	Michael Alfonso	August 11, 2026	Open Seat	Elected
(Wisconsin) WI-08	Tony Wied	August 11, 2026	Incumbent	Elected
(Wyoming) WY-AL	Chuck Gray	August 18, 2026	Open Seat	Elected

==== 2026 state legislative special elections ====
District	Candidate	Primary date	Seat status	Result
(Florida) FL HD-87	Jon Maples	January 14, 2026	Open	Lost general

==== 2026 state legislative elections ====
State	Candidate	Office	Seat status	Primary result
Florida	Rick Roth	Florida State Senator	Open Seat	Won Primary
Florida	Ileana Garcia	Florida State Senator	Incumbent	Won Primary
Florida	Ana Maria Rodriguez	Florida State Senator	Incumbent	Won Primary
Florida	Meg Weinberger	Florida State Representative	Incumbent	Won Primary
Indiana	Trevor De Vries	Indiana State Senator	Challenger	Won Primary
Indiana	Brian Schmutzler	Indiana State Senator	Challenger	Won Primary
Indiana	Tyler Johnson	Indiana State Senator	Incumbent	Won Primary
Indiana	Liz Brown	Indiana State Senator	Incumbent	Won Primary
Indiana	Blake Fiechter	Indiana State Senator	Challenger	Won Primary
Indiana	Tracey Powell	Indiana State Senator	Challenger	Won Primary
Indiana	Ron Alting	Indiana State Senator	Incumbent	Won Primary
Indiana	Paula Copenhaver	Indiana State Senator	Challenger	Lost primary
Indiana	Mike Gaskill	Indiana State Senator	Incumbent	Won Primary
Indiana	Scott Alexander	Indiana State Senator	Incumbent	Won Primary
Indiana	Jeff Raatz	Indiana State Senator	Incumbent	Won Primary
Indiana	Brenda Wilson	Indiana State Senator	Challenger	Lost primary
Indiana	Jeff Ellington	Indiana State Senator	Open seat	Won Primary
Indiana	Michelle Davis	Indiana State Senator	Challenger	Won Primary
Indiana	Randy Maxwell	Indiana State Senator	Incumbent	Won Primary
Indiana	Chris Garten	Indiana State Senator	Incumbent	Won Primary
Indiana	Gary Byrne	Indiana State Senator	Incumbent	Won Primary
Indiana	Daryl Schmitt	Indiana State Senator	Incumbent	Won Primary
Indiana	Jim Tomes	Indiana State Senator	Incumbent	Won Primary
Indiana	Jim Pressel	Indiana State Representative	Incumbent	Won Primary
Indiana	Craig Snow	Indiana State Representative	Incumbent	Won Primary
Indiana	Jeff Thompson	Indiana State Representative	Incumbent	Won Primary
Indiana	Heath VanNatter	Indiana State Representative	Incumbent	Won Primary
Indiana	Beau Baird	Indiana State Representative	Incumbent	Won Primary
Indiana	Bruce Borders	Indiana State Representative	Incumbent	Lost primary
Indiana	Bob Heaton	Indiana State Representative	Incumbent	Won Primary
Indiana	Tony Isa	Indiana State Representative	Incumbent	Won Primary
Indiana	Ben Smaltz	Indiana State Representative	Incumbent	Won Primary
Indiana	Martin Carbaugh	Indiana State Representative	Incumbent	Won Primary
North Carolina	Phil Berger	North Carolina State Senator	Incumbent	Lost primary
Tennessee	Kenny Cody	Tennessee State Representative	Open Seat	Won Primary
Texas	Kevin Sparks	Texas State Senator	Incumbent	Won Primary
Texas	David Cook	Texas State Senator	Open seat	Won Primary
Texas	Brian Harrison	Texas State Representative	Incumbent	Won Primary
Texas	Angelia Orr	Texas State Representative	Incumbent	Won Primary
Texas	Jeff Leach	Texas State Representative	Incumbent	Won Primary
Texas	Tom Craddick	Texas State Representative	Incumbent	Won Primary
Texas	Dustin Burrows	Texas State Representative	Incumbent	Won Primary
Texas	Candy Noble	Texas State Representative	Incumbent	Won Primary

== International ==
=== Argentina ===
==== 2027 ====
Position	Candidate	Results
President of Argentina	Javier Milei (La Libertad Avanza)	TBA

=== Armenia ===
==== 2026 ====
Position	Candidate	Results
Prime Minister of Armenia	Nikol Pashinyan (Civil Contract)	Elected prime minister

=== Brazil ===
==== 2022 ====
Position	Candidate	Results
President of Brazil	Jair Bolsonaro (Liberal Party)	Lost election

=== Colombia ===
==== 2026 ====
Position	Candidate	Results
President of Colombia	Abelardo de la Espriella (Defenders of the Homeland)	Elected President

=== Honduras ===
==== 2025 ====
Position	Candidate	Results
President of Honduras	Nasry Asfura (National Party)	Elected president

=== Hungary ===
==== 2022 ====
Position	Candidate	Results
Prime Minister of Hungary	Viktor Orbán (Fidesz)	Fidesz won the election with a supermajority of seats and Orbán remained Prime Minister

==== 2026 ====
Position	Candidate	Results
Prime Minister of Hungary	Viktor Orbán (Fidesz)	Lost election

=== Iraq ===
==== 2026 ====
Position	Candidate	Results
Prime Minister of Iraq	Ali al-Zaidi (Coordination Framework)	The office is selected by Iraq's parliamentary process rather than by direct popular election following the aftermath of the 2025 Iraqi parliamentary election.

=== Israel ===
==== 2013 ====
Position	Candidate	Results
Prime Minister of Israel	Benjamin Netanyahu (Likud Yisrael Beiteinu)	Likud Yisrael Beiteinu won a plurality of seats in the election and formed a coalition government alongside other parties, with Netanyahu chosen as Prime Minister

==== 2019 ====
Position	Candidate	Results
Prime Minister of Israel	Benjamin Netanyahu (Likud)	/ Likud won a plurality of seats, but no party obtained an outright majority, resulting in an hung Parliament and in the calling of a snap election, which was held in September 2019; Netanyahu remained in office as caretaker Prime Minister

==== 2026 ====
Position	Candidate	Results
Prime Minister of Israel	Benjamin Netanyahu (Likud)	TBA

=== Italy ===
==== 2022 ====
Position	Candidate	Results
Prime Minister of Italy	Giuseppe Conte (Five Star Movement)	The Five Star Movement won a minority of seats in the election and became part of the opposition

=== Japan ===
==== 2026 ====
Position	Candidate	Results
Prime Minister of Japan	Sanae Takaichi (Liberal Democratic Party)	Elected

=== Poland ===
==== 2025 ====
Position	Candidate	Results
President of Poland	Karol Nawrocki (Law and Justice)	Elected

=== UK ===
==== 2016 ====
Referendum	Option	Results
United Kingdom European Union membership referendum	"Leave the European Union"	Won

==== 2019 ====
Election	Position	Candidate	Result
(United Kingdom) 2019 Conservative Party leadership election	Leader of the Conservative Party	Boris Johnson	Elected
2019 United Kingdom general election	Prime Minister of the United Kingdom	Boris Johnson (Conservative Party)	Elected with an outright majority
