= TGN =

TGN may refer to:

- Tarragona, abbreviation of the city of Tarragona, in Catalonia
- Thai Global Network, a Thai satellite television channel
- Texas Government Newsletter, for college students
- Tyco Global Network, fiber optic network by Tyco International
- Trans Golgi network in biology
- IEEE 802.11n Task Group N
- Thyroglobulin, a protein
- Getty Thesaurus of Geographic Names
- TGN (AM) radio station, Guatemala
- Latrobe Regional Airport, IATA airport code "TGN"
