= 2025–26 Texas's 9th Senate district special election =

- November 4, 2025 (first round); January 31, 2026 (runoff)

Texas's 9th Senate district
- Turnout: 17.39% (first round); 15.41% (runoff)
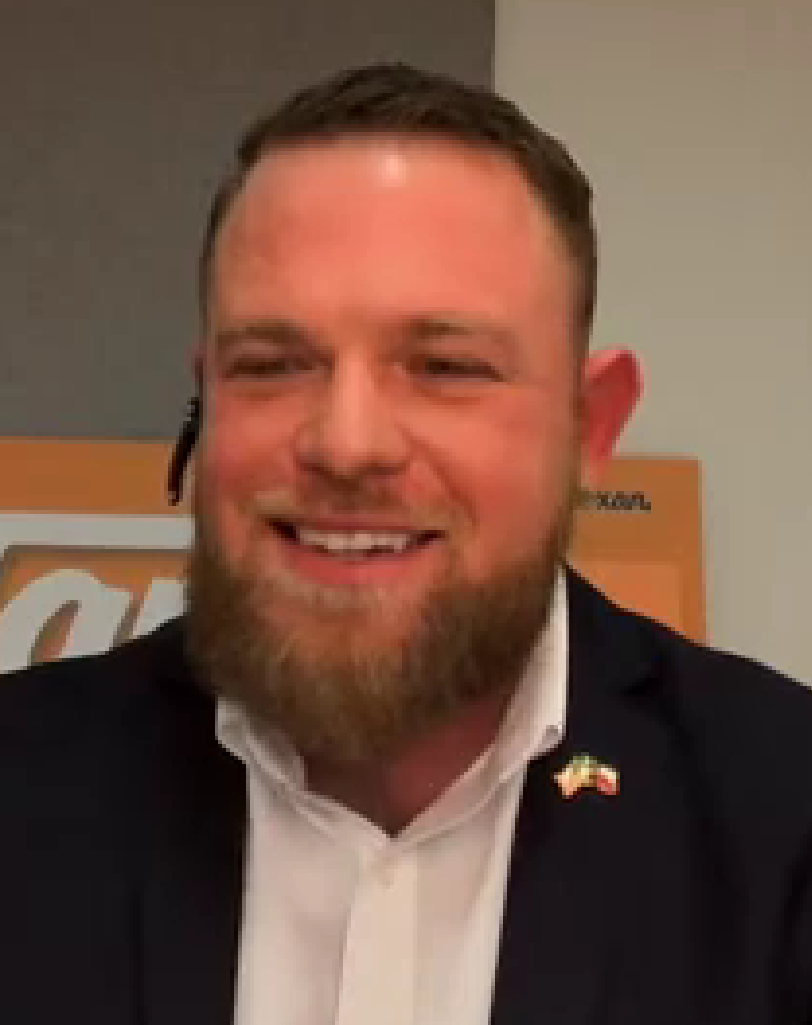

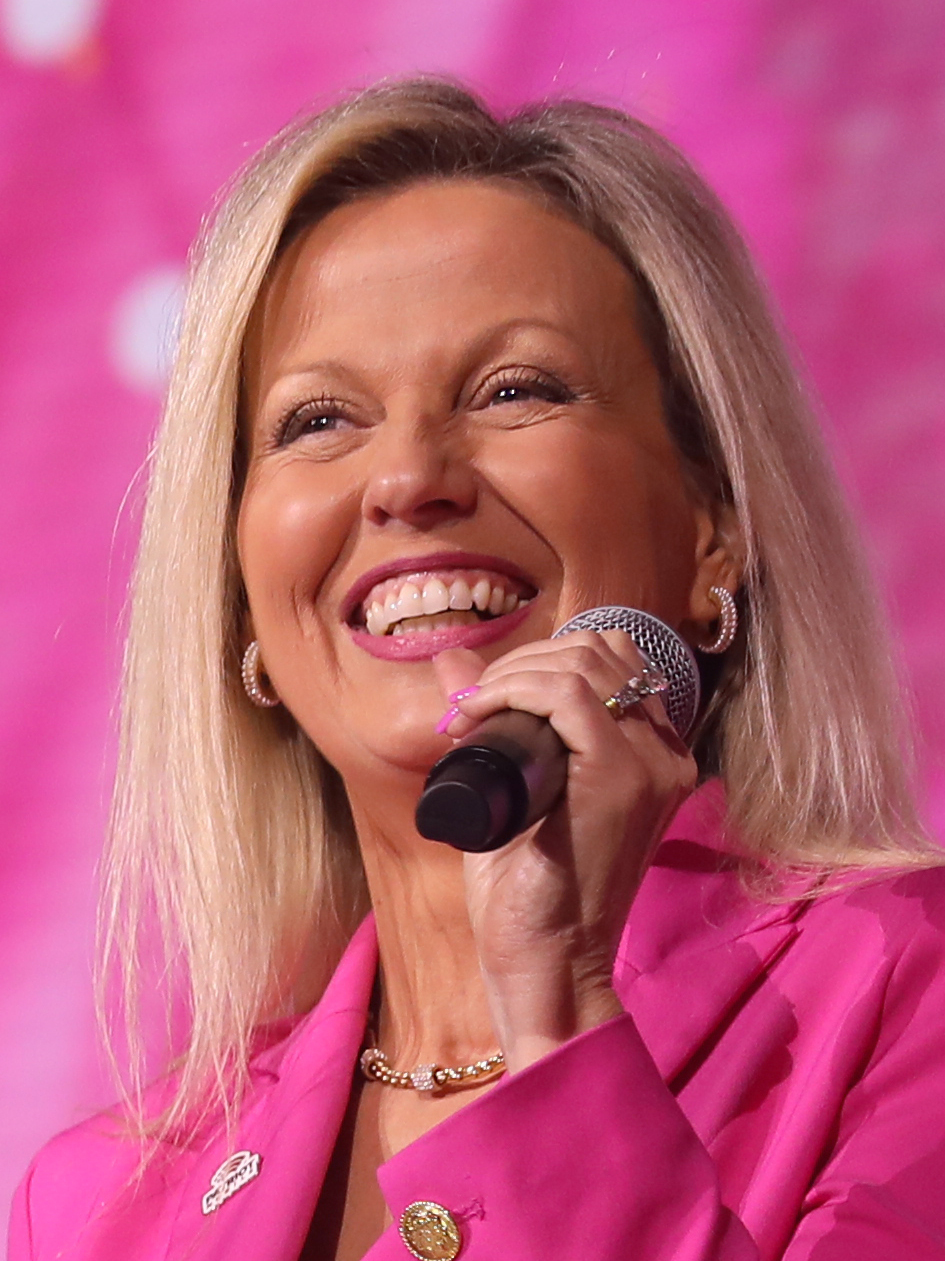

Candidate	Taylor Rehmet	Leigh Wambsganss	John Huffman
Party	Democratic	Republican	Republican
First round	56,565; 47.57%	42,739; 35.94%	19,608; 16.49%
Runoff	54,473; 57.27%	40,648; 42.73%	Eliminated
- Rehmet: 30–40% 40–50% 50–60% 60–70% 70–80% 80–90% >90% Wambsganss: 30–40% 40–50% 50–60% 60–70% 70–80% >90% Huffman: >90% Tie: 50% No votes
Senator before election
Kelly Hancock
Republican
Elected Senator
Taylor Rehmet
Democratic

A special election was held on November 4, 2025, with a runoff on January 31, 2026, to fill the vacant 9th district in the Texas Senate. The district was vacant following the resignation of Republican Kelly Hancock to become the Texas Comptroller of Public Accounts.

== Background ==
Incumbent Republican Senator Kelly Hancock resigned on June 18, 2025, to become chief clerk of the Texas Comptroller of Public Accounts. This led to a special election in the 9th district, which governor Greg Abbott scheduled for November 4, 2025.

Texas's 9th Senate district is strongly Republican, with Donald Trump carrying the district by 17 percentage points in the 2024 presidential election. Special elections in Texas use a two-round system: candidates of all parties appear on the ballot together, and if no candidate receives 50% of the vote, a runoff election is held between the top two candidates.

== First round ==
=== Candidates ===
==== Advanced to runoff ====
- Taylor Rehmet (Democratic) union president and veteran
- Leigh Wambsganss (Republican) activist and Chief Communications Officer at Patriot Mobile

==== Eliminated in first round ====
- John Huffman (Republican) former mayor of Southlake, Texas and candidate for Texas's 26th congressional district in 2024

==== Withdrawn ====
- Armin Mizani (Republican), mayor of Keller (running for the Texas House of Representatives in 2026)
- Nate Schatzline (Republican), state representative from the 93rd district (endorsed Wambsganss)

=== Campaign ===
Republicans John Huffman and Leigh Wambsganss are both seen as highly conservative, but differences on specific issues divide them. Huffman received approximately $500,000 from a PAC bankrolled by Dallas Mavericks owner Miriam Adelson, a proponent of legalizing gambling in Texas. Wambsganss received approximately $450,000 from a PAC started by Texas oil tycoons Tim Dunn and Farris Wilks. Democratic candidate Taylor Rehmet primarily received support from workers' unions, Democratic lawmakers, and small individual contributions.

=== Endorsements ===
John Huffman (R)

Mayors

- Mattie Parker, mayor of Fort Worth

Organizations

- Fort Worth Police Officers Association

Newspapers and publications

- Fort Worth Star-Telegram
- The Dallas Morning News (Endorsed Rehmet in runoff)
Taylor Rehmet (D)

State legislators

- Chris Turner, state representative from the 101st district
- Nathan M. Johnson, state senator from the 16th district
- Roland Gutierrez, state senator from the 19th district

County officials

- Alisa Simmons, Tarrant County commissioner
- Roderick Miles Jr., Tarrant County commissioner

Labor unions

- International Association of Machinists and Aerospace Workers
- Texas AFL–CIO
- Texas American Federation of Teachers

Organizations

- Greater Fort Worth Sierra Club
- Texas Working Families Party
Leigh Wambsganss (R)

Executive branch officials

- Donald Trump, 45th and 47th president of the United States (2017–2021, 2025–present)

Federal officials

- Ted Cruz, U.S. senator from Texas

Statewide officials

- Dan Patrick, lieutenant governor

State legislators

- Tan Parker, majority leader and state senator from the 12th district
- Nate Schatzline, state representative from the 93rd district

County officials

- Tim O'Hare, Tarrant County judge

Notable individuals

- Chris McNutt, gun rights activist

Organizations

- Texas Gun Rights

=== Results ===
Rehmet's nearly 48% of the vote in the election, short of the 50% required to avoid a runoff, was already a considerable overperformance compared to the district's usual voting patterns. His two Republican opponents' combined vote share was above 50%, but his large lead indicated the potential for an upset victory in the January runoff.

Senate District 9 special election
Party	Candidate	Votes	%
Democratic	Taylor Rehmet	56,565	47.57%
Republican	Leigh Wambsganss	42,739	35.94%
Republican	John Huffman	19,608	16.49%
Total votes		118,912	100.00

== Runoff ==
During the runoff campaign, Wambsganss continued to outraise and outspend Rehmet, with donations from several sources for Wambsganss topping $100,000, while Rehmet's donations mostly came from smaller sources. Turnout was higher than usual for similar special elections despite Winter Storm Fern hitting the region during the early voting period. While most observers considered Republicans favored to win the race, they conceded that a narrow victory could signal trouble for Republicans ahead of the 2026 midterm elections.

Rehmet won the election in an upset by an unexpectedly large margin, becoming the first Democrat to represent northern Tarrant County in the Senate since before the 1982 election. Rehmet will not serve any active legislative days during his unexpired term, facing a general election for the seat in November 2026. His situation echoes that of fellow Tarrant County Democrat Dan Barrett, who won a 2007 special election for House District 97 before losing in the 2008 general election by a wide margin.

=== Results ===
Senate District 9 special election runoff
Party	Candidate	Votes	%
Democratic	Taylor Rehmet	54,473	57.27%
Republican	Leigh Wambsganss	40,648	42.73%
Total votes		95,121	100.00%
Democratic gain from Republican			

=== Analysis ===
Rehmet received significant crossover support in his victory, winning nearly 30% of voters who had previously voted in Republican primaries, and over 70% of voters who had voted in neither primary recently. The race had very low voter turnout, typical of off-cycle special elections, but this did not result in disproportionately high turnout among Democratic primary voters. Rehmet also won nearly 80% of the estimated Hispanic vote in the district, a marked improvement for Democrats compared to the 2024 election, which saw Hispanic voters swing sharply towards Donald Trump, particularly in the Rio Grande Valley, but also in urban areas like Fort Worth. Analysts have attributed this, as well as Rehmet's appeal to working class voters and suburban backlash to Wambsganss' sharply conservative policies, as the key factors in this victory. Pete Sessions blamed icy weather for the loss, however, by claiming that the poor conditions prevented people from voting.
