= Leigh Wambsganss =

American conservative political activist

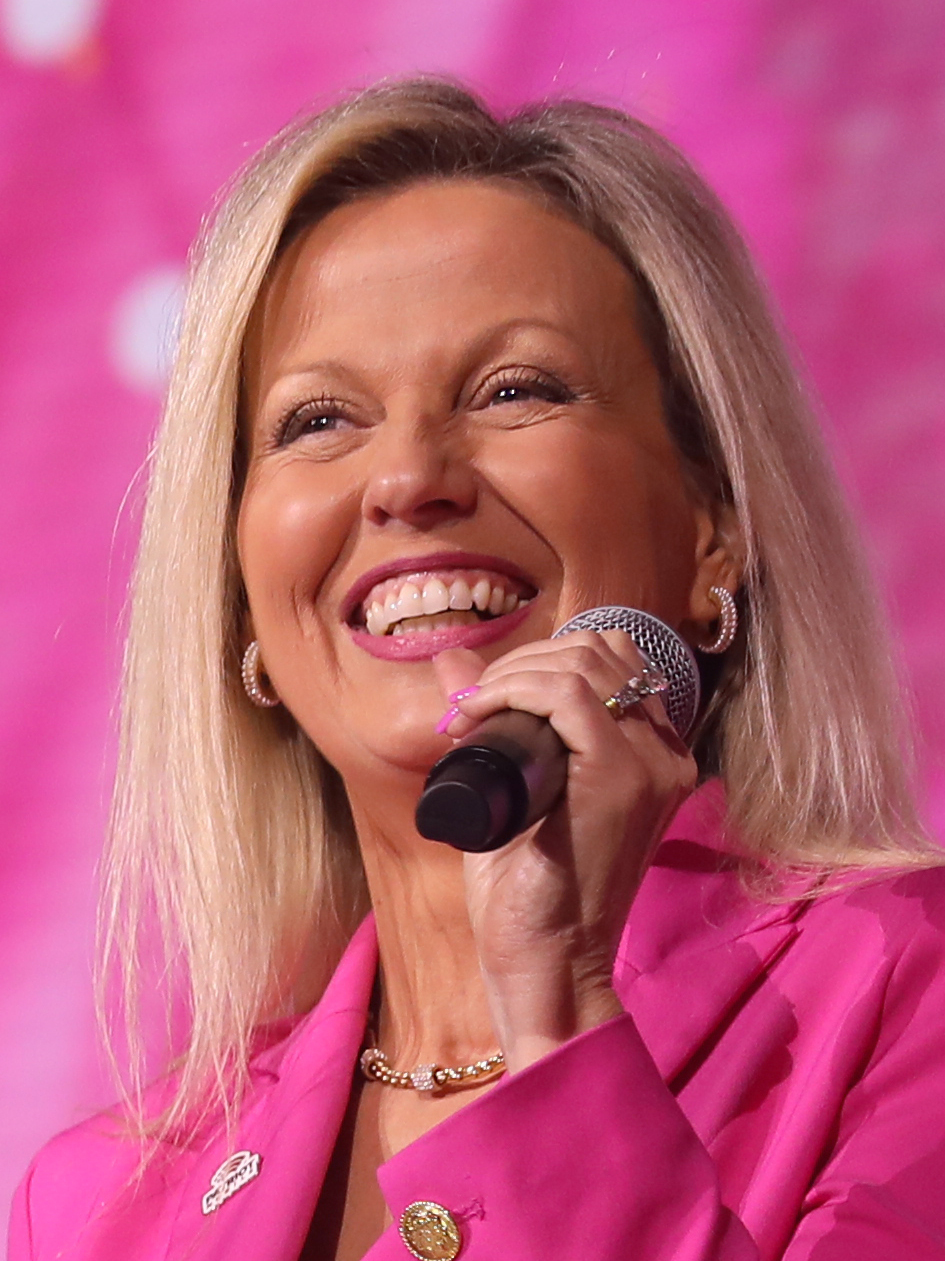
- Wambsganss in 2024

Personal details
- Born: Loretta Leigh Bowman Virginia, U.S.
- Party: Republican
- Spouse(s): David Magee (m. 1993; div. 1998) Andrew Wambsganss (m. 1999)
- Children: 2
- Education: University of Central Oklahoma (BA); Dallas Baptist University (MA)

Loretta Leigh Wambsganss (née Bowman) is an American conservative political activist who is the chief communications officer of Patriot Mobile and executive director of its affiliated political action committee, Patriot Mobile Action. She supported school board candidates who opposed diversity, equity, and inclusion initiatives and critical race theory in the Dallas–Fort Worth region as co-chair of Southlake Families PAC.

Wambsganss was the Republican candidate in the January 31, 2026, special runoff election for the 9th district of the Texas Senate, losing to Democrat Taylor Rehmet. Wambsganss was defeated by Rehmet again in the November 3, 2026, general election.

== Early life and education ==
Loretta Leigh Bowman was born in Virginia; her mother was an insurance agent and her father was a police officer before joining the U.S. Army and moving the family to Fort Sill in Oklahoma. Bowman was a finalist for the 1988 Miss Oklahoma USA contest and is credited in the 1989 slasher film Offerings.

She earned a Bachelor of Arts in broadcast journalism from the University of Central Oklahoma and a Master of Arts in organizational management from Dallas Baptist University.

== Career ==
=== Political activism in Colorado ===
Shortly after her first marriage in 1993, Wambsganss moved to Grand Junction, Colorado, where she formed and co-chaired the "Concerned Citizens Against Incorporation of Clifton" group, which opposed the unincorporated Fruitvale joining nearby Clifton in favor of Grand Junction.

Wambsganss started her professional career as a television news anchor, reporter and producer. She was a congressional staffer and was listed in The Daily Sentinel in 1996 and again in 1997 as the area representative in Grand Junction for U.S. Representative Scott McInnis.

=== Political activism in Texas ===
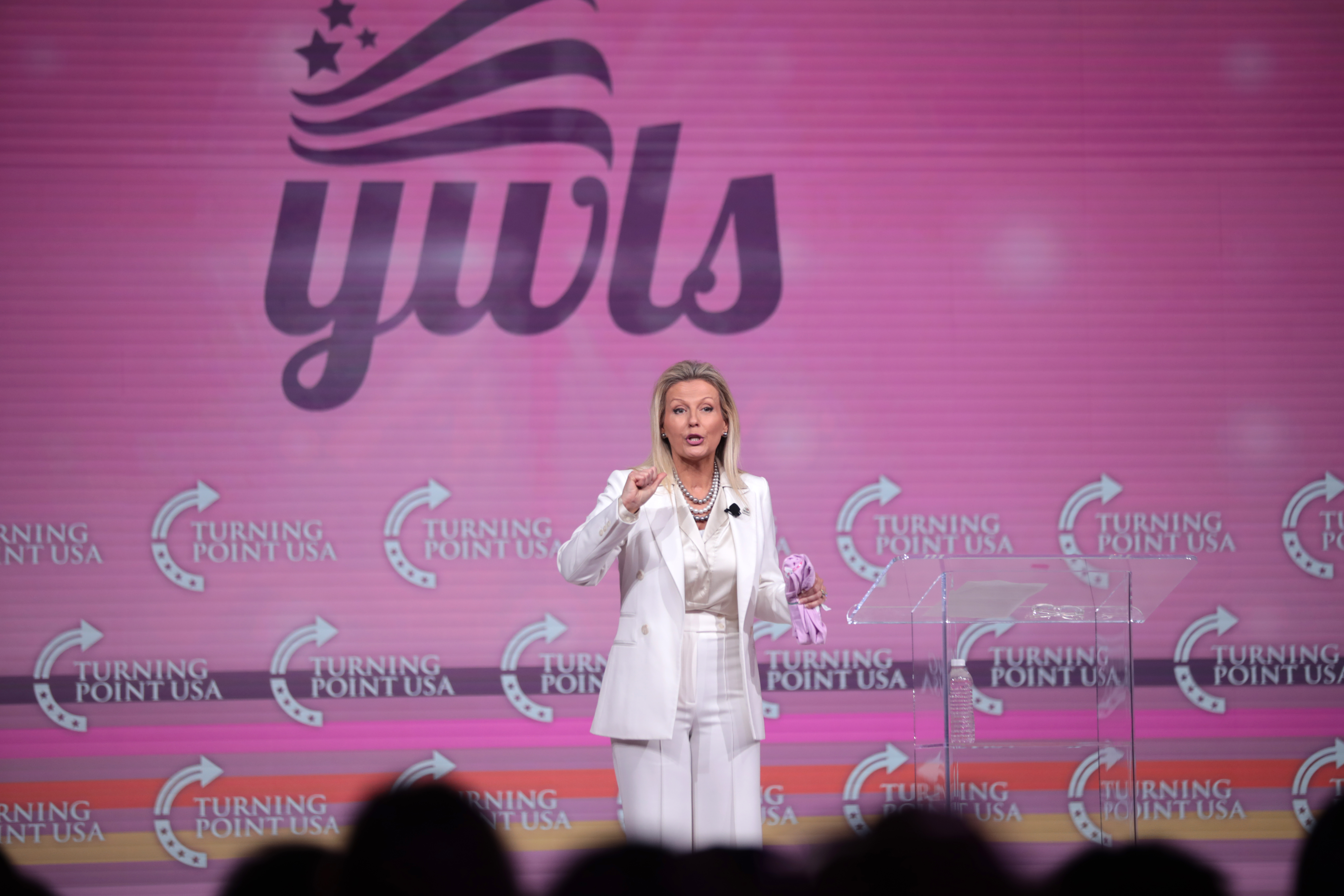
Wambsganss speaks at the Turning Point USA's Young Women for Liberty Summit in 2024.

Amidst the George Floyd protests in 2020, Wambsganss made a Facebook post stating "Sadly, they need to die - but they would still vote" in reference to Black Lives Matter protestors and a conspiracy theory that people were impersonating dead voters.

Speaking at the 2023 Moms for Liberty summit, Wambsganss stated "This is not a political war, it is a spiritual war!" She also testified against the Tarrant County Commissioners providing funding for the county's chapter of Girls Inc. due to the national affiliate's advocacy on LGBTQ rights and abortion, stating the national and local chapter could not be separated.

In late 2024, in response to the Modern Art Museum of Fort Worth including, in a section that includes the photography of Sally Mann, nude depictions of children that many conservatives have characterized as child pornography, Wambsganss stated that "Every adult that approves this, from the board to the staff, should be held accountable."

==== Patriot Mobile ====
Wambsganss served as vice president of government and public affairs at Patriot Mobile, then became the company's chief communications officer.

==== School board activism ====
In 2021, Wambsganss earned national acclaim among conservatives for her work as one of the co-founders alongside Tim O'Hare of Southlake Families PAC, a group that promotes itself as "unapologetically rooted in Judeo-Christian values" that fought against the Carroll Independent School District's diversity plan to crack down on racism and anti-LGBTQ bullying. Under her leadership, it raised hundreds of thousands of dollars to support a slate of school board candidates who promised to kill the plan.

She also serves as the executive director of the political action committee Patriot Mobile Action, where she stated that the group's goal was to eliminate "critical race theory" and "LGBTQ indoctrination" from schools by electing conservative school board members. The group targeted numerous independent school district boards in 2022, supporting far-right candidates in the Keller ISD, Grapevine-Colleyville ISD, Mansfield ISD and Carroll ISD school boards in Tarrant County in the 2022 elections. While all 11 school board candidates backed by Patriot Mobile Action won in 2022, by 2025, only four of the eleven remained on their respective school boards: five lost their re-election bids and one resigned after controversy for allowing a documentary crew into a school to film students without parental consent.

==== State Senate campaigns ====
On June 27, 2025, Wambsganss announced her campaign for the November 4th special election to the Texas Senate in district 9, where incumbent Republican Kelly Hancock resigned to become acting Texas comptroller. She quickly gained the endorsement of Lieutenant Governor Dan Patrick and state representative Nate Schatzline, who had previously announced his campaign but withdrew after she entered the race. Other declared candidates in the nonpartisan primary included former Republican Southlake mayor John Huffman and Democratic labor union leader Taylor Rehmet. Rehmet placed first with 47% of the vote while Wambsganss placed second with 36% of the vote, advancing to a run-off election to be held on January 31.

Wambsganss was soundly defeated by Rehmet in the run-off. The election gained significant attention after Rehmet won by more than 14 percent, particularly due to Trump winning the district by 17 percentage points in the 2024 presidential election and the district having not been represented by a Democrat since 1991.

In the regularly-scheduled November 3, 2026, general election, Rehmet again defeated Wambsganss by a closer margin.

==== Political ideology ====
Ideologically, Wambsganss has been described as a Christian nationalist.

In the 2026 runoff election for Senate District 9, Wambsganss was endorsed by President Donald Trump, who posted in support of her on Truth Social in the week leading up to the election. Following her loss to Rehmet, Trump told reporters he was “not involved” in the race and had “nothing to do with it.”

Following her loss, Wambsganss' campaign for the November 2026 election was noted as distancing itself from Trump. This included removing the phrase "ULTRA MAGA" from her campaign social media, swapping out a photo with him and removing a "Trump Endorsed" banner from her campaign website, as well as dropping his endorsement from her campaign signs.

== Personal life ==
Bowman married David Magee, a firefighter in Grand Junction, Colorado, in 1993. The couple moved to Fort Worth around 1996 then Haslet in 1998, but divorced later that year. A year later, she married then-council member and later mayor of Southlake, Andrew Wambsganss. They have two sons and reside in Southlake.

== Electoral history ==
=== 2025 ===
Texas Senate District 9 special election, November 2025
Party	Candidate	Votes	%
Democratic	Taylor Rehmet	56,565	47.57
Republican	Leigh Wambsganss	42,739	35.94
Republican	John Huffman	19,608	16.49
Total votes		118,912	100.00

=== 2026 ===
Texas Senate District 9 special election runoff, January 2026
Party	Candidate	Votes	%
Democratic	Taylor Rehmet	54,473	57.27%
Republican	Leigh Wambsganss	40,648	42.73%
Total votes		95,121	100.0
Democratic gain from Republican			
