= 2026 Texas Senate election =

- November 3, 2026

16 of the 31 seats in the Texas Senate 16 seats needed for a majority

| | Majority party | Minority party |
|---|---|---|
| Leader | Tan Parker | Carol Alvarado |
| Party | Republican | Democratic |
| Leader since | January 14, 2025 | January 8, 2020 |
| Leader's seat | 12th–Flower Mound | 6th–Houston |
| Last election | 8 seats, 45.00% | 7 seats, 54.88% |
| Seats before | 19 | 12 |
| Seats won | 19 | 12 |
| Seat change | Steady | Steady |
| Seats up | 11 | 5 |
- Map of the incumbents: Republican hold Democratic hold No election
Majority Leader before election
Tan Parker
Republican
Elected Majority Leader
Republican

The 2026 Texas Senate election was held on November 3, 2026, alongside elections for the state house. Elections were held in 16 of the 31 Senate districts for four-year terms. The winners of this election will serve in the 90th Texas Legislature. 18 Senate seats are currently held by Republicans, 12 seats are held by Democrats, and one seat, formerly held by a Republican, is vacant. Primary elections were held on March 3, 2026, with a runoff election held May 26, 2026 in district 19, where no Republican primary candidate secured a majority of the vote. Republicans maintained control of the chamber.

== Background ==
Republicans have controlled the Senate since the 1996 election. Republicans gained one seat in the heavily-Hispanic Rio Grande Valley in the 2024 election, increasing their majority to 20 out of 31 seats.

=== 2025 regular session ===
During the regular session, the legislature passed a number of bills to advance a conservative agenda. Chief among them a school voucher bill, long a priority of the Senate which had historically been stifled in the more moderate House of Representatives. The bill allocates $1 billion of public funds for children to attend private schools or for their parents to homeschool them, prioritized based on income and disability. Other conservative hallmarks related to education included requiring public schools to display the Ten Commandments in classrooms, banning diversity, equity, and inclusion policies from public schools, and restricting free speech on college campuses in the wake of Gaza war protests at universities. Other new laws included the tightening of bail, restricting the rights of transgender people, easing access to vaccine exemption, and cutting property taxes. On a more bipartisan basis, the legislature passed bills to alleviate water supply issues, clarify medical exceptions in the state's abortion ban, and ease the construction of housing in amidst the state's growing housing crisis.

=== Special sessions and redistricting ===
Governor Greg Abbott had already planned to call a special session to address legislation that did not pass in time during the regular session or that Abbott vetoed, such as a ban on THC products, as well as to address new issues such as deadly flooding in central Texas. At the request of president Donald Trump, Abbott added congressional redistricting to the agenda with the goal of flipping five Democratic-held U.S. House seats to the Republicans in the 2026 elections. Senate Democrats staged a walkout before the final vote on the bill, with all but two of them leaving the chamber, but unlike in the House, this was not enough to break quorum and block the bill's passage. The House walkout forced the chamber to pass the bill in a second special session after their walkout ended, which it did on a party-line vote.

=== District partisanship ===
2024 Presidential data by Senate district: Trump: 50–60%; 60–70%; 70–80%; 80–90%; Harris: 50–60%; 60–70%; 70–80%

In the 2024 presidential election, Republican Donald Trump won 21 districts, while Democrat Kamala Harris won 10 districts. Democrats hold 2 districts in which Trump won, although only one is up for election in 2026. Republicans hold no districts won by Harris. Republicans made massive gains across the historically-Democratic Rio Grande Valley region in 2024.

| District | Trump margin of victory in 2024 | Incumbent | Party | First elected | Incumbent's previous margin |
|---|---|---|---|---|---|
| 9th district | R+17.4 | Taylor Rehmet | Democratic | 2025 (special) | D+14.5 |
| 20th district | R+4.3 | Juan Hinojosa | Democratic | 2002 | D+100 (Note: Incumbent was unopposed.) |

== Retirements ==
1. District 3: Robert Nichols is retiring
2. District 4: Brandon Creighton resigned early to serve as Chancellor of the Texas Tech University System
3. District 11: Mayes Middleton is retiring to run for Attorney General
4. District 22: Brian Birdwell is retiring

== Open seats that parties held ==
=== Republican seats held by Republicans ===
1. District 3: Won by Trent Ashby.
2. District 11: Won by Dennis Paul.
3. District 22: Won by David Cook.

== Predictions ==
=== Statewide ===
| Source | Ranking | As of |
|---|---|---|
| Sabato's Crystal Ball | Likely R | October 16, 2026 |
| State Navigate | Safe R | October 29, 2026 |

=== Competitive districts ===
District 9, located in the northern half of Tarrant County, is considered the only highly competitive Senate race in the state, due to having a Democratic incumbent in a district which voted heavily for Donald Trump in the 2024 election. Districts 19 and 21 along the Texas-Mexico border are considered by some to be competitive as well, due to having only narrowly voted for Kamala Harris in 2024.

| District | Incumbent | Last result | State Navigate (Note: Ratings simplified from percentages: <60% = "Tilt"; 60–75% = "Lean"; 75–95% = "Likely"; >95% = "Safe") Sept. 22, 2026 | Capitol Inside Oct. 29, 2026 |
|---|---|---|---|---|
| 2nd | Bob Hall | 61.90% R | Safe R | Lean R |
| 5th | Charles Schwertner | 71.57% R | Safe R | Lean R |
| 9th | Taylor Rehmet | 57.27% D | Likely D | Likely D |
| 11th | Mayes Middleton (retiring) | 100.00% R | Safe R | Lean R |
| 19th | Roland Gutierrez | 55.39% D | Safe D | Likely D |
| 24th | Pete Flores | 64.32% R | Safe R | Likely R |
| Overall | | | Rep – 19; Dem – 12 | Rep – 19; Dem – 12 |

== Special elections ==
A special election took place to fill the unexpired term in Texas's 9th Senate district. A special election is scheduled for May 2, 2026, to fill the unexpired term in Texas's 4th Senate district.

=== 2025 District 9 special election ===
Republican Kelly Hancock resigned to become chief clerk of the Texas Comptroller's office in June 2025. A special election to serve the remainder of the term took place on November 4th, 2025. Democratic candidate Taylor Rehmet received the most votes at 47.6%. He was followed by Republicans Leigh Wambsganss, 36%, and John Huffman, 16%. Rehmet and Wembsganss advanced to a runoff held on January 31, 2026, which Rehmet unexpectedly won by a large margin.

Senate District 9 special election
| Party | Candidate | Votes | % |
|---|---|---|---|
| Democratic | Taylor Rehmet | 56,565 | 47.57% |
| Republican | Leigh Wambsganss | 42,739 | 35.94% |
| Republican | John Huffman | 19,608 | 16.49% |
| Total votes | | 118,912 | 100.00 |

Senate District 9 special election runoff
| Party | Candidate | Votes | % |
|---|---|---|---|
| Democratic | Taylor Rehmet | 54,473 | 57.27% |
| Republican | Leigh Wambsganss | 40,648 | 42.73% |
| Total votes | | 95,121 | 100.00% |
| Democratic gain from Republican | | | |

=== District 4 special election ===
Brandon Creighton resigned to serve as Chancellor of the Texas Tech University System. A special election was held on May 2, 2026, in which Montgomery County District Attorney Brett Ligon, running as a Republican, won the seat.

District 4 special election
| Party | Candidate | Votes | % |
|---|---|---|---|
| Republican | Brett Ligon | 26,068 | 75.06% |
| Democratic | Ron Angeletti | 8,662 | 24.94% |
| Total votes | | 34,730 | 100% |
| Republican hold | | | |

== Summary of results ==
While the Senate saw a number of unexpectedly close races amid a nationwide Democratic wave election which saw the party win every statewide office up for election and control of the Texas House of Representatives, no seat changed parties, leaving Republicans with a 19–12 majority in the chamber. This left the Senate as Republicans' strongest lever of power in the state's government. The election of Democrat Vikki Goodwin to the lieutenant governorship led to speculation that Republicans would strip the office of many of its powers in presiding over the chamber. Under Republican Dan Patrick, senators had ceded near-absolute authority to the office regarding what legislation comes up to vote, but because most of these powers are only defined by the chamber's own rules, Republicans have the power to rescind them with a majority vote.

Summary of the November 3, 2026 Texas Senate election results
| Party | Candidates | Votes | | Seats | | | | |
| Party | Candidates | No. | % | Before | Up | Won | After | +/– |
|---|---|---|---|---|---|---|---|---|
| Republican | 14 | | | 19 | 11 | 11 | 19 | Steady |
| Democratic | 16 | | | 12 | 5 | 5 | 12 | Steady |
| Green | 1 | | | 0 | 0 | 0 | 0 | Steady |
| Total | | | | 31 | 16 | 16 | 31 | Steady |

=== By district ===
† - Incumbent not seeking re-election

| District | 2024 Pres. | Incumbent | Party | Elected Senator | Party |
|---|---|---|---|---|---|
| 1st | R+54.1 | Bryan Hughes | Rep | Bryan Hughes | Rep |
| 2nd | R+20.3 | Bob Hall | Rep | Bob Hall | Rep |
| 3rd | R+52.6 | Robert Nichols† | Rep | Trent Ashby | Rep |
| 4th | R+34.2 | Brett Ligon | Rep | Brett Ligon | Rep |
| 5th | R+23.2 | Charles Schwertner | Rep | Charles Schwertner | Rep |
| 9th | R+17.1 | Taylor Rehmet | Dem | Taylor Rehmet | Dem |
| 11th | R+20.4 | Mayes Middleton† | Rep | Dennis Paul | Rep |
| 13th | D+47.6 | Borris Miles | Dem | Borris Miles | Dem |
| 18th | R+27.3 | Lois Kolkhorst | Rep | Lois Kolkhorst | Rep |
| 19th | D+1.4 | Roland Gutierrez | Dem | Roland Gutierrez | Dem |
| 21st | D+3.2 | Judith Zaffirini | Dem | Judith Zaffirini | Dem |
| 22nd | R+28.0 | Brian Birdwell† | Rep | David Cook | Rep |
| 24th | R+25.1 | Pete Flores | Rep | Pete Flores | Rep |
| 26th | D+22.5 | Jose Menendez | Dem | Jose Menendez | Dem |
| 28th | R+51.6 | Charles Perry | Rep | Charles Perry | Rep |
| 31st | R+61.5 | Kevin Sparks | Rep | Kevin Sparks | Rep |

== Detailed results ==
Results according to the Texas Secretary of State.

=== District 1 ===
Incumbent Republican Bryan Hughes ran for re-election despite speculation that he might run for attorney general. He won the general election against Democrat Laticia Ambroz by a wide margin.

District 1 general election
| Party | Candidate | Votes | % |
|---|---|---|---|
| Republican | Bryan Hughes (incumbent) | | |
| Democratic | Laticia Ambroz | | |
| Total votes | | | |

=== District 2 ===
Incumbent Republican Bob Hall ran for re-election. He defeated a challenge from Jason Eddington in the primary, and faced Democrat Keenen Colbert in the general election. Hall won the election, but the race was much closer than expected.

District 2 Republican primary
| Party | Candidate | Votes | % |
|---|---|---|---|
| Republican | Bob Hall (incumbent) | 62,610 | 78.71% |
| Republican | Jason Eddington | 16,936 | 21.29% |
| Total votes | | 79,546 | 100.0% |

District 2 general election
| Party | Candidate | Votes | % |
|---|---|---|---|
| Republican | Bob Hall (incumbent) | | |
| Democratic | Keenen Colbert | | |
| Total votes | | | |

=== District 3 ===
Incumbent Republican Robert Nichols retired. Nichols was one of only two Republicans to vote to convict attorney general Ken Paxton during his 2023 impeachment trial, and he was the only Senate Republican to vote against school voucher legislation. Trent Ashby, state representative from the 9th district, defeated Rhonda Ward in the Republican primary.

Rhonda Ward, a first-time candidate, received nearly $2 million in campaign funds from businessman James Moyer, one of the largest donations to any legislative candidate this election cycle. The disproportionate size of Moyer's donation compare to the rest of Ward's campaign funds has raised concerns among residents about Moyer's influence over Ward, especially regarding the construction of AI data centers, although Moyer's company is not directly tied to any construction efforts in the district. Ward is considered a hardline conservative, having signed a pledge to call a referendum on Texas's secession from the United States. In contrast to this, Ashby was seen as the more moderate of the two. Lieutenant governor Dan Patrick did not endorse either candidate in the race.

Ashby faced Democrat Bobby Tillman in the general election where he won by a large margin.

District 3 Republican primary
| Party | Candidate | Votes | % |
|---|---|---|---|
| Republican | Trent Ashby | 72,075 | 62.33% |
| Republican | Rhonda Ward | 43,566 | 37.67% |
| Total votes | | 115,641 | 100.0% |

District 3 general election
| Party | Candidate | Votes | % |
|---|---|---|---|
| Republican | Trent Ashby | | |
| Democratic | Bobby Tillman | | |
| Total votes | | | |

=== District 4 ===
Brandon Creighton resigned to serve as Chancellor of the Texas Tech University System. Brett Ligon, who ran who ran for district 4's seat, defeated Charlie Miller in the Republican primary. A special election was held on May 2, 2026, in which Ligon defeated Ron Angeletti for the seat.

District 4 Republican primary
| Party | Candidate | Votes | % |
|---|---|---|---|
| Republican | Brett Ligon | 65,939 | 74.48% |
| Republican | Charlie Miller | 22,590 | 25.52% |
| Total votes | | 88,529 | 100.0% |

District 4 special election
| Party | Candidate | Votes | % |
|---|---|---|---|
| Republican | Brett Ligon | 26,068 | 75.06% |
| Democratic | Ron Angeletti | 8,662 | 24.94% |
| Total votes | | 34,730 | 100% |

=== District 5 ===
Incumbent Republican Charles Schwertner ran for re-election. Schwertner has faced multiple scandals during his time in office, including an arrest for driving while intoxicated and allegations of sexual harassment, although no charges were brought against him for either. In light of these scandals, the Austin American-Statesman endorsed challenger Apollo Hernandez in the primary against Schwertner. Schwertner defeated Hernandez and Larry Nance in the Republican primary.

Schwertner faced Democrat Paul Thomasson in the general election. Schwertner narrowly won the election.

District 5 Republican primary
| Party | Candidate | Votes | % |
|---|---|---|---|
| Republican | Charles Schwertner (incumbent) | 66,931 | 74.65% |
| Republican | Apollo Hernandez | 13,357 | 14.90% |
| Republican | Larry Nance | 9,373 | 10.45% |
| Total votes | | 89,661 | 100.0% |

District 5 Democratic primary
| Party | Candidate | Votes | % |
|---|---|---|---|
| Democratic | Paul Thomasson | 31,810 | 51.27% |
| Democratic | Kevin Nelson | 30,230 | 48.73% |
| Total votes | | 62,040 | 100.0% |

District 5 general election
| Party | Candidate | Votes | % |
|---|---|---|---|
| Republican | Charles Schwertner (incumbent) | | |
| Democratic | Paul Thomasson | | |
| Total votes | | | 100% |

=== District 9 ===
Incumbent Democrat Taylor Rehmet was elected in a January special election runoff. The November general election was a rematch against his special election opponent, Republican Leigh Wambsganss. The legislature was not in session for any of Rehmet's unexpired term, and he was not appointed to any interim Senate committees. Both parties saw the race as a rallying point in Tarrant County, one of the marquee battleground counties in the state, seeking to use the race to motivate voters in several other competitive races in the county. Both candidates campaigned on regulating data center construction, as well as on regulating THC products, opposing a full ban on the substance. Rehmet campaigned with particular emphasis on increasing public school funding, repealing the state's school voucher program, and increasing local government control relative to the state, which had been restricted in 2023. Wambsganss focused on reducing taxes and limiting government regulation. Wambsganss was considered a hardline "ultra-MAGA" Republican, while Rehmet was considered a blue-collar Democrat, focusing on labor protections and affordability. Spending was much more muted in the general election, compared to the special election, with far more parity between the two candidates.

District 9 voted heavily for Donald Trump in the 2024 election, leading Republicans shortly after the runoff to project confidence in their ability to win the district back. However, a private poll taken by a Republican internal pollster in September showed Rehmet leading Wambsganss 53–39 in the race alongside several statewide Democrats holding smaller, though still substantial leads in the district, casting doubt on the district's Republican fundamentals. Late in the campaign, Wambsganss downplayed her hardline conservatism and distanced herself from Trump to appeal to moderate voters in the district, particularly those skeptical of Ken Paxton's candidacy for U.S. Senate. John Huffman, the more moderate Republican who was eliminated in the first round of the special election, declined to endorse either candidate. Rehmet received the endorsement of The Dallas Morning News. Rehment was re-elected to a full term.

District 9 general election
| Party | Candidate | Votes | % |
|---|---|---|---|
| Democratic | Taylor Rehmet (incumbent) | | |
| Republican | Leigh Wambsganss | | |
| Total votes | | | |

=== District 11 ===
Incumbent Republican Mayes Middleton retired to run for Attorney General. Republican state representative Dennis Paul ran to succeed Middleton, Paul's campaign was endorsed by lieutenant governor Dan Patrick. He won the nomination unopposed. Two Democrats, coordinator Shannon Dicely and systems specialist Cameron Rollwitz, ran for the Democratic nomination, which Dicely won. Paul received the endorsement of the Houston Chronicle. Paul defeated Dicely in the general election in a race that was much closer than expected.

District 11 Democratic primary
| Party | Candidate | Votes | % |
|---|---|---|---|
| Democratic | Shannon Dicely | 46,484 | 74.75% |
| Democratic | Cameron Rollwitz | 15,705 | 25.25% |
| Total votes | | 62,189 | 100.0% |

District 11 general election
| Party | Candidate | Votes | % |
|---|---|---|---|
| Republican | Dennis Paul | | |
| Democratic | Shannon Dicely | | |
| Total votes | | | |

=== District 13 ===
Incumbent Democrat Borris Miles won re-election unopposed.

District 13 general election
| Party | Candidate | Votes | % |
|---|---|---|---|
| Democratic | Borris Miles (incumbent) | | |
| Total votes | | | |

=== District 18 ===
Incumbent Republican Lois Kolkhorst ran for re-election. She faced Democrat Erica Gillum in the general election. Kolkhort campaigned heavily on opposition to Flock cameras and other automated license plate readers in the state, drafting legislation to ban them statewide. Kolkhorst won re-election by a narrower margin than expected.

District 18 general election
| Party | Candidate | Votes | % |
|---|---|---|---|
| Republican | Lois Kolkhorst (incumbent) | | |
| Democratic | Erica Gillum | | |
| Total votes | | | |

=== District 19 ===
Incumbent Democrat Roland Gutierrez ran for re-election. The Republican primary featured candidates Marcus Cardenas, Robert Marks Jr. and Adam Ernest Salyer. No candidate in the Republican primary received over 50% and a runoff election was held on May 26, 2026 between Cardenas and Marks, in which Cardenas won. District 19, located along the Texas-Mexico border, voted narrowly for Kamala Harris in the 2024 presidential election and was seen by some as potentially competitive in the general election. Gutierrez was re-elected by a large margin.

District 19 Republican primary
| Party | Candidate | Votes | % |
|---|---|---|---|
| Republican | Marcus Cardenas | 14,646 | 44.32% |
| Republican | Robert Marks Jr. | 10,616 | 32.13% |
| Republican | Adam Ernest Salyer | 7,783 | 23.55% |
| Total votes | | 33,045 | 100.0% |

District 19 Republican primary runoff
| Party | Candidate | Votes | % |
|---|---|---|---|
| Republican | Marcus Cardenas | 11,877 | 52.57% |
| Republican | Robert Marks Jr. | 10,735 | 47.43% |
| Total votes | | 22,612 | 100.0% |

District 19 general election
| Party | Candidate | Votes | % |
|---|---|---|---|
| Democratic | Roland Gutierrez (incumbent) | | |
| Republican | Marcus Cardenas | | |
| Total votes | | | |

=== District 21 ===
Incumbent Democrat Judith Zaffirini ran for re-election. She defeated social worker Cortney Jones in the Democratic primary and faced Republican Julie Dahlberg in the general election. District 21, located along the Texas-Mexico border, voted narrowly for Kamala Harris in the 2024 presidential election and was seen by some as potentially competitive in the general election. Zaffirini was re-elected by a wide margin.

District 21 Democratic primary
| Party | Candidate | Votes | % |
|---|---|---|---|
| Democratic | Judith Zaffirini (incumbent) | 67,324 | 73.16% |
| Democratic | Cortney Jones | 24,704 | 26.84% |
| Total votes | | 92,028 | 100.0% |

District 21 general election
| Party | Candidate | Votes | % |
|---|---|---|---|
| Democratic | Judith Zaffirini (incumbent) | | |
| Republican | Julie Dahlberg | | |
| Total votes | | | |

=== District 22 ===
Incumbent Republican Brian Birdwell did not run for re-election. Three Republicans filed for the nomination: State representative David Cook, McLennan County District Clerk Jon Gimble, and Angel Wings Ranch director Rena Schroeder. Cook won the primary and faced Democrat Amy Martinez-Salas in the general election. Schroeder announced she would endorse Martinez-Salas in the general election, citing concerns over support for AI data centers. Birdwell resigned from his seat early to join the Second Trump Administration, triggering a special election to be held concurrently with the general election for the remainder of the unexpired term. Cook won both races.

District 22 Republican primary
| Party | Candidate | Votes | % |
|---|---|---|---|
| Republican | David Cook | 57,804 | 67.34% |
| Republican | Jon Gimble | 20,624 | 24.03% |
| Republican | Rena Schroeder | 7,409 | 8.63% |
| Total votes | | 85,837 | 100.0% |

District 22 special election
| Party | Candidate | Votes | % |
|---|---|---|---|
| Republican | David Cook | | |
| Democratic | Amy Martinez-Salas | | |
| Total votes | | | |

District 22 general election
| Party | Candidate | Votes | % |
|---|---|---|---|
| Republican | David Cook | | |
| Democratic | Amy Martinez-Salas | | |
| Total votes | | | |

=== District 24 ===
Incumbent Republican Pete Flores ran for re-election and will faced Democrat Joe Herrera in the general election. Flores was re-elected.

District 24 general election
| Party | Candidate | Votes | % |
|---|---|---|---|
| Republican | Pete Flores (incumbent) | | |
| Democratic | Joe Herrera | | |
| Total votes | | | |

=== District 26 ===
Incumbent Democrat José Menéndez ran for re-election. In the general election, he faced Julián Villarreal, the Green Party nominee who previously ran for this seat in 2020. Menéndez was re-elected by a large margin.

District 26 general election
| Party | Candidate | Votes | % |
|---|---|---|---|
| Democratic | José Menéndez (incumbent) | | |
| Green | Julián Villarreal | | |
| Total votes | | | |

=== District 28 ===
Incumbent Republican Charles Perry ran for re-election. He defeated Democrat Riley Rodriquez by a large margin.

District 28 general election
| Party | Candidate | Votes | % |
|---|---|---|---|
| Republican | Charles Perry (incumbent) | | |
| Democratic | Riley Rodriquez | | |
| Total votes | | | |

=== District 31 ===
Incumbent Republican Kevin Sparks ran for re-election. He faced Democrat and Amarillo College regent John Betancourt. Sparks won the general election by a large margin.

District 31 general election
| Party | Candidate | Votes | % |
|---|---|---|---|
| Republican | Kevin Sparks (incumbent) | | |
| Democratic | John Betancourt | | |
| Total votes | | | |

== See also ==
- 2024 Texas elections
- 2026 Texas elections
