= Texas's 9th Senate district =

American legislative district

Texas's 9th State Senate district
Senator
Taylor Rehmet; D–Fort Worth
- Demographics: 43.1% White; 14.2% Black; 35% Hispanic; 7.5% Asian
- Population: 902,387

District 9 of the Texas Senate is a senatorial district that currently serves a portion of Tarrant County in the U.S. state of Texas, including Keller, North Richland Hills, Hurst, and a large portion of Fort Worth. The seat is currently held by senator Taylor Rehmet, who won the January 2026 Special Election.

== Election history ==
Election history of District 9 from 1992.

=== 2026 Special Election ===
Special election, November 4, 2025: Senate District 9
Party	Candidate	Votes	%
Democratic	Taylor Rehmet	56,565	47.57
Republican	Leigh Wambsganss	42,739	35.94
Republican	John Huffman	19,608	16.49
Total votes		118,912	100.00

Special election runoff, January 31, 2026: Senate District 9
Party	Candidate	Votes	%	±%
Democratic	Taylor Rehmet	54,280	57.21	+17.25
Republican	Leigh Wambsganss	40,600	42.79	−17.25
Total votes		94,880	100.0	
Democratic gain from Republican				

=== 2022 ===
Texas general election, 2022: Senate District 9
Party	Candidate	Votes	%	±%
Republican	Kelly Hancock (incumbent)	166,864	60.05	+6.02
Democratic	Gwenn Burud	111,019	39.95	−6.02
Total votes		277,883	100.0	
Republican hold				

=== 2018 ===
Texas general election, 2018: Senate District 9
Party	Candidate	Votes	%	±%
Republican	Kelly Hancock (incumbent)	132,256	54.03	−11.03
Democratic	Gwenn Burud	112,537	45.97	+11.03
Total votes		244,793	100.0	
Republican hold				

=== 2014 ===
Texas general election, 2014: Senate District 9
Party	Candidate	Votes	%	±%
Republican	Kelly Hancock	89,331	65.06	+6.71
Democratic	Gregory R. Perry	47,965	34.94	−3.27
Turnout		137,296		
Republican hold				

=== 2012 ===
Texas general election, 2012: Senate District 9
Party	Candidate	Votes	%	±%
Republican	Kelly Hancock	136,288	58.35	+4.27
Democratic	Pete Martinez	89,255	38.21	−5.12
Libertarian	Dave (Mac) McElwee	8,034	3.44	+0.86
Turnout		233,577		
Republican hold				

=== 2008 ===
Texas general election, 2008: Senate District 9
Party	Candidate	Votes	%	±%
Republican	Chris Harris (Incumbent)	125,443	54.08	−45.92
Democratic	Melvin Willms	100,509	43.33	+43.33
Libertarian	Carl Nulsen	5,991	2.58	+2.58
Majority		24,934		−10.75
Turnout		231,943		
Republican hold				

=== 2004 ===
Texas general election, 2004: Senate District 9
Party	Candidate	Votes	%	±%
Republican	Chris Harris (Incumbent)	143,501	100.00	+13.44
Majority		143,501	100.00	+26.87
Turnout		143,501		+51.50
Republican hold				

=== 2002 ===
Texas general election, 2002: Senate District 9
Party	Candidate	Votes	%	±%
Republican	Chris Harris (Incumbent)	81,994	86.56	−13.44
Libertarian	David C. Pepperdine	12,727	13.44	+13.44
Majority		69,267	73.13	−26.87
Turnout		94,721		−54.26
Republican hold				

=== 2000 ===
Texas general election, 2000: Senate District 9
Party	Candidate	Votes	%	±%
Republican	Jane Nelson (Incumbent)	207,079	100.00	0.00
Majority		207,079	100.00	0.00
Turnout		207,079		+29.19
Republican hold				

=== 1996 ===
Texas general election, 1996: Senate District 9
Party	Candidate	Votes	%	±%
Republican	Jane Nelson (Incumbent)	160,296	100.00	0.00
Majority		160,296	100.00	0.00
Turnout		160,296		+25.60
Republican hold				

=== 1994 ===
Texas general election, 1994: Senate District 9
Party	Candidate	Votes	%	±%
Republican	Jane Nelson (Incumbent)	127,623	100.00	+39.44
Majority		127,623	100.00	+78.88
Turnout		127,623		−31.75
Republican hold				

=== 1992 ===
Texas general election, 1992: Senate District 9
Party	Candidate	Votes	%	±%
Republican	David Sibley (Incumbent)	113,246	60.56	
Democratic	Charles "Charlie" Osborn	73,759	39.44	
Majority		39,487	21.12	
Turnout		187,005		
Republican hold				

== District officeholders ==
Legislature	Senator, District 9	Counties in District
1	Jesse Grimes	Montgomery.
2	Jesse Grimes	Grimes, Montgomery, Walker.
3	John H. Moffitt	All of Jefferson, Liberty, Polk, Tyler. Portion of Angelina.
4	William Thomas Scott	Harrison, Upshur.
5	David Gage	Rusk.
6	James Winwright Flanagan	Rusk.
7	Malcolm D. Graham	Rusk.
8	Jesse H. Parsons	Rusk.
9	Samuel Bell Maxey; Rice Maxey	Hopkins, Lamar.
10	Rice Maxey	Hopkins, Lamar.
11	Hudson W. Nelson	Hopkins, Lamar.
12	Henry Russell Latimer	Red River, Titus.
13	Henry Russell Latimer	Red River, Titus.
14	L. D. Bradley	Freestone, Limestone, Navarro.
15	Charles D. Grace	Delta, Fannin, Lamar.
16	Charles D. Grace	Delta, Fannin, Lamar.
17	Henry W. Lightfoot	Delta, Fannin, Lamar.
18	James W. Jones	Harris, Montgomery, Trinity, Walker.
19	James W. Jones	Harris, Montgomery, Trinity, Walker.
20	Leonard Anderson Abercrombie	Harris, Montgomery, Trinity, Walker.
21	Leonard Anderson Abercrombie	Harris, Montgomery, Trinity, Walker.
22	Theodore U. Lubbock	Harris, Montgomery, Trinity, Walker.
23	George T. Jester	Henderson, Kaufman, Navarro.
24	Oscar Branch Colquitt	Henderson, Kaufman, Navarro.
25	Oscar Branch Colquitt	Henderson, Kaufman, Navarro.
26	Ben H. Johnson	Henderson, Kaufman, Navarro.
27	Ben H. Johnson	Henderson, Kaufman, Navarro.
28	James J. Faulk	Henderson, Kaufman, Navarro.
29	James J. Faulk	Henderson, Kaufman, Navarro.
30	Walter R. Holsey	Henderson, Kaufman, Navarro.
31	Walter R. Holsey	Henderson, Kaufman, Navarro.
32	Robert L. Warren	Henderson, Kaufman, Navarro.
33	Robert L. Warren	Henderson, Kaufman, Navarro.
34	Archie C. Robbins	Henderson, Kaufman, Navarro.
35	Archie C. Robbins	Henderson, Kaufman, Navarro.
36	James H. Woods	Henderson, Kaufman, Navarro.
37	James H. Woods	Henderson, Kaufman, Navarro.
38	James H. Woods	Henderson, Kaufman, Navarro.
39	W. S. Moore; Ed Westbrook	Cooke, Fannin, Grayson.
40	Ed Westbrook	Cooke, Fannin, Grayson.
41	Ed Westbrook	Cooke, Fannin, Grayson.
42	Jacob J. Loy; Cecil Murphy	Cooke, Fannin, Grayson.
43	Cecil Murphy	Cooke, Fannin, Grayson.
44	Olan R. Van Zandt	Cooke, Fannin, Grayson.
45	Olan R. Van Zandt	Cooke, Fannin, Grayson.
46	Olan R. Van Zandt	Cooke, Fannin, Grayson.
47	Olan R. Van Zandt	Cooke, Fannin, Grayson.
48	Charles R. Jones	Cooke, Fannin, Grayson.
49	Charles R. Jones	Cooke, Fannin, Grayson.
50	Charles R. Jones	Cooke, Fannin, Grayson.
51	Charles R. Jones	Cooke, Fannin, Grayson.
52	Joe D. Carter	Cooke, Fannin, Grayson.
53	Joe Russell	Collin, Cooke, Fannin, Grayson, Hunt, Rains, Rockwall.
54	Ray Roberts	Collin, Cooke, Fannin, Grayson, Hunt, Rains, Rockwall.
55	Ray Roberts	Collin, Cooke, Fannin, Grayson, Hunt, Rains, Rockwall.
56	Ray Roberts	Collin, Cooke, Fannin, Grayson, Hunt, Rains, Rockwall.
57	Ray Roberts	Collin, Cooke, Fannin, Grayson, Hunt, Rains, Rockwall.
58	Ralph Hall	Collin, Cooke, Fannin, Grayson, Hunt, Rains, Rockwall.
59	Ralph Hall	Collin, Cooke, Fannin, Grayson, Hunt, Rains, Rockwall.
60	Ralph Hall	Collin, Cooke, Denton, Grayson, Hunt, Kaufman, Rains, Rockwall.
61	Ralph Hall	All of Collin, Cooke, Denton, Grayson, Hunt, Kaufman, Rains, Rockwall. Portion of Dallas.
62	Ralph Hall	All of Collin, Cooke, Denton, Grayson, Hunt, Kaufman, Rains, Rockwall. Portion of Dallas.
63	Ron Clower	All of Ellis, Limestone, Navarro. Portion of Dallas.
64	Ron Clower	All of Ellis, Limestone, Navarro. Portion of Dallas.
65	Ron Clower	All of Ellis, Limestone, Navarro. Portion of Dallas.
66	Ron Clower	All of Ellis, Limestone, Navarro. Portion of Dallas.
67	Dee Travis	All of Ellis, Limestone, Navarro. Portion of Dallas.
68	Chet Edwards	All of Ellis, Falls, Freestone, Henderson, Hill, Limestone, McLennan, Navarro. Portion of Dallas.
69	Chet Edwards	All of Ellis, Falls, Freestone, Henderson, Hill, Limestone, McLennan, Navarro. Portion of Dallas.
70	Chet Edwards	All of Ellis, Falls, Freestone, Henderson, Hill, Limestone, McLennan, Navarro. Portion of Dallas.
71	Chet Edwards	All of Ellis, Falls, Freestone, Henderson, Hill, Limestone, McLennan, Navarro. Portion of Dallas.
72	David Sibley	All of Ellis, Falls, Freestone, Henderson, Hill, Limestone, McLennan, Navarro. Portion of Dallas.
73	David Sibley	All of Ellis, Hill, McLennan, Navarro. Portions of Dallas, Tarrant.
74	Jane Nelson	Portions of Dallas, Denton, Ellis, Tarrant.
75	Jane Nelson	Portions of Dallas, Denton, Ellis, Tarrant.
76	Jane Nelson	Portions of Dallas, Denton, Ellis, Tarrant.
77	Jane Nelson	Portions of Dallas, Denton, Ellis, Tarrant.
78	Chris Harris	Portions of Dallas, Denton, Tarrant.
79	Chris Harris	Portions of Dallas, Denton, Tarrant.
80	Chris Harris	Portions of Dallas, Denton, Tarrant.
81	Chris Harris	Portions of Dallas, Denton, Tarrant.
82	Chris Harris	Portions of Dallas, Denton, Tarrant.
83	Kelly Hancock	Portions of Dallas, Denton, Tarrant.
84	Kelly Hancock	Portions of Dallas, Denton, Tarrant.
85	Kelly Hancock	Portions of Dallas, Denton, Tarrant.
86	Kelly Hancock	Portions of Dallas, Denton, Tarrant.
87	Kelly Hancock	Portions of Dallas, Denton, Tarrant.
88	Kelly Hancock	Portion of Tarrant.
89	Kelly Hancock	Portion of Tarrant.
89	Kelly Hancock; Taylor Rehmet	Portion of Tarrant.
