= Texas Senate =

Upper house of the Texas Legislature

Coordinates: 30°16′28″N 97°44′24″W

- 89th Texas Legislature

Type
- Type: Upper house of the Texas Legislature
- Term limits: None

History
- New session started: January 14, 2025

Leadership
- President: Dan Patrick (R) since January 20, 2015
- President pro tempore: Charles Perry (R) since June 2, 2025
- Majority Leader: Tan Parker (R) since January 14, 2025
- Minority Leader: Carol Alvarado (D) since January 8, 2020

Structure
- Seats: 31
- Political groups: Majority: Republican (18); Minority: Democratic (12); Vacant: Vacant (1)
- Length of term: 4 years (with one 2-year term each decade)
- Authority: Article 3, Texas Constitution
- Salary: $7,200/year + per diem

Elections
- Voting system: First-past-the-post
- Last election: November 3, 2026 (16 seats)
- Next election: November 8, 2028 (15 seats)
- Redistricting: Legislative control

Meeting place
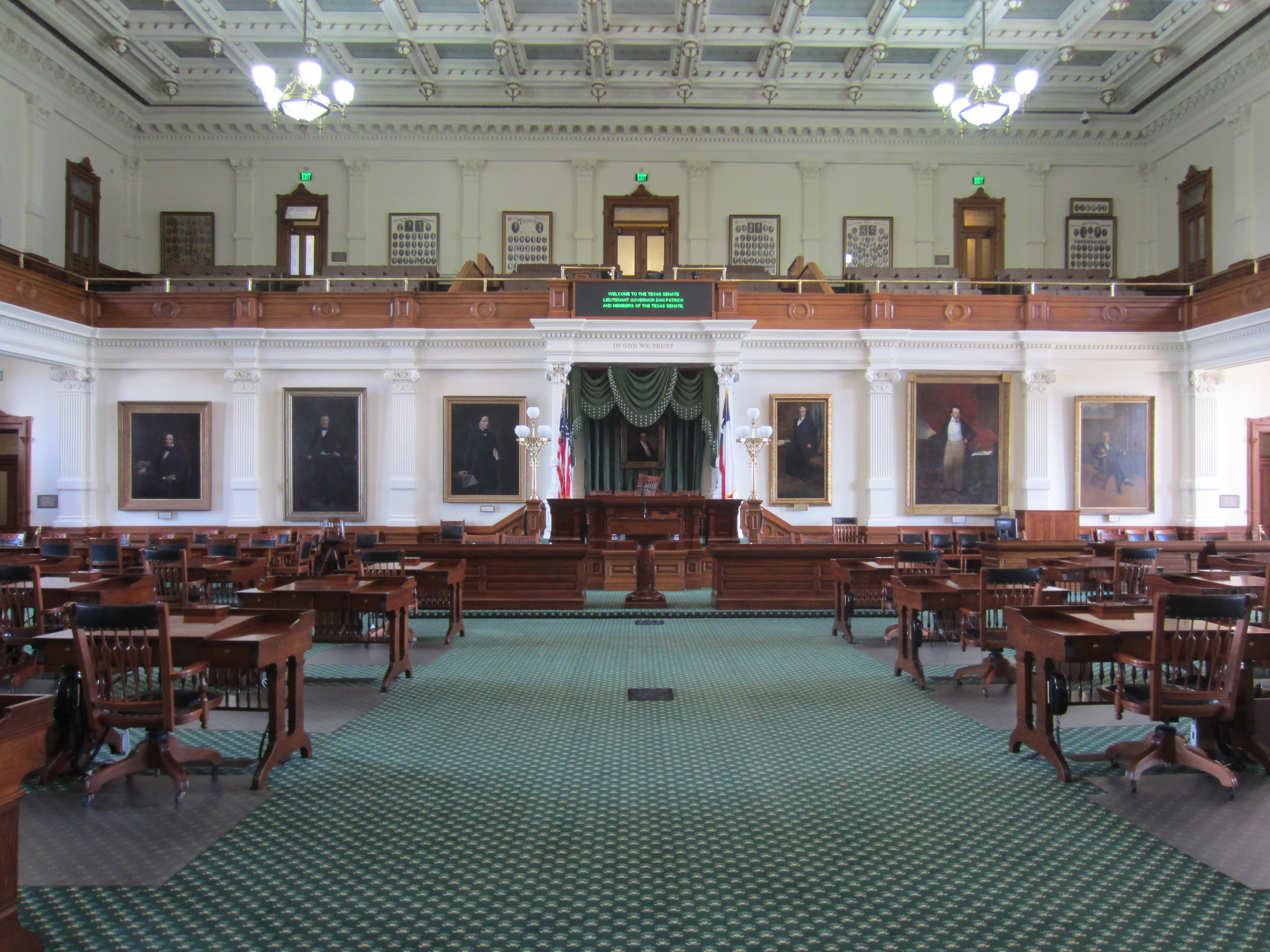
- State Senate Chamber; Texas State Capitol; Austin, Texas

Website
- Texas Senate

The Texas Senate is the upper house of the Texas Legislature, with the Texas House of Representatives functioning as the lower house. Together, they form a bicameral system for the state legislature of Texas. The Senate has meetings at the Texas State Capitol in Austin for several occasions, such as budgeting, lawmaking, addressing important issues, or joint sessions.

The Republicans currently control the chamber. With 1 vacant seat, there is currently a total of 18 Republicans and 12 Democrats making up the Senate.

The Senate is made up of 31 members, where each represents a single-member district across the U.S. state of Texas, with populations of approximately 940,000 per constituency, based on the 2020 U.S. census. Texas Senate districts contain the second largest electorate per member for a legislature in the United States (slightly under the 988,000 per California State Senator). Elections are held in even-numbered years on the first Tuesday after the first Monday in November.

Senators serve four year terms, with no term limits. Senators are divided into two groups based in part on the intervening Census:

- In elections in years ending in "2" (the election after the Census), all 31 seats are up for election.
- Once the Senate meets in session after said election, the Senators will participate in a drawing to determine their election cycle:
  - One-half will have a 2-4-4 cycle, whereupon the seat would stand for election after two years (the year ending in "4"), then again in four years (the year ending in "8"), then finally in another four years (coinciding with all seats standing for election in the year ending in "2").
  - The other half will have a 4-4-2 cycle, whereupon the seat would stand for election after four years (the year ending in "6"), then again in four years (the year ending in "0"), then finally in only two years (coinciding with all seats standing for election in the year ending in "2").

As such, every two years, almost half of the senate is up for election.

== Leadership ==
The Lieutenant Governor of Texas serves as the President of the Senate. Unlike most lieutenant governors who are constitutionally designated as presiding officers of the upper house, the Lieutenant Governor regularly presides over the chamber rather than delegate this role to the President Pro Tempore. The Lieutenant Governor's duties include appointing chairs of committees, committee members, assigning and referring bills to specific committees, recognizing members during debate, and making procedural rulings. The Lieutenant Governor may also cast a vote should a Senate floor vote end in a tie. If the Senate votes to dissolve itself into the Committee of the Whole, in which all members are part of the Committee, the President Pro-Tempore presides over the proceedings, with the Lieutenant Governor acting as a regular voting member. Due to the various powers of committee selection and bill assignment, the Lieutenant Governor of Texas is considered one of the most powerful lieutenant governorships in the United States.

Unlike other state legislatures, the Texas Senate does not have official majority or minority leaders. Instead, the President Pro Tempore is considered the second most powerful position, regardless of party affiliation. Presidents Pro Tempore are usually the most senior members of the Senate. The President Pro Tempore presides when the Lieutenant Governor is not present or when the legislature is not in regular session.

=== Leaders ===
Position	Name	Party	Residence	District
Lieutenant Governor/President of the Senate	Dan Patrick	Republican	Houston	Elected Statewide
President Pro Tempore	Charles Perry	Republican	Lubbock	28

== History ==
=== Quorum-busting ===
There have been at least three cases of quorum-busting in Texas Senate history. The first case was in 1870, with the Rump Senate, followed by the 1979 Killer Bees and finally the "Texas Eleven" in August 2003 during the controversial mid-decade redistricting plan at the time.

== Committee structure ==
The Lieutenant Governor appoints the members to the various standing committees. The exact number and size of these committees can change with any given session. In addition to the standing committees there can be issue specific special, joint, and interim committees.

The following represents the Senate standing committee structure for the 89th Legislature (numbers in parentheses are the number of committee members).

- Administration (7)
- Border Security (5)
- Business and Commerce (11)
- Criminal Justice (7)
- Economic Development (5)
- Education K-16 (11)
- Finance (15)
- Health & Human Services (8)
- Jurisprudence (5)
- Local Government (7)
- Natural Resources (8)
- Nominations (9)
- State Affairs (11)
- Transportation (9)
- Veteran Affairs (7)
- Water, Agriculture and Rural Affairs (9)

In addition to these committees, there are also six joint committees composed of members of both the State Senate and House:

- Criminal Justice Legislative Oversight
- Legislative Audit Committee (Note: This committees has six members: the Speaker of the House and the Lieutenant Governor (who serve as joint chairs), the Chair of the Senate Finance Committee, the Chairs of the House Appropriations and Ways and Means Committees, and one Senator appointed by the Lieutenant Governor; the Committee in turn hires and oversees the State Auditor of Texas.)
- Legislative Budget Board (Note: This committee has ten members: the Speaker of the House and the Lieutenant Governor (who serve as joint chairs), the Chair of the Senate Finance Committee, the Chairs of the House Appropriations and Ways and Means Committees, three Senators appointed by the Lieutenant Governor, and two Representatives appointed by the Speaker.)
- Legislative Reference Library Board (Note: This committee has six members: the Speaker of the House and the Lieutenant Governor the Chair of the House Appropriations Committee, two Senators appointed by the Lieutenant Governor, and one Representative appointed by the Speaker.)
- Sunset Advisory Commission
- Texas Legislative Council (Note: This committee has 14 members: the Speaker of the House and the Lieutenant Governor (who serve as joint chairs), the Chair of the House Administration Committee, six Senators appointed by the Lieutenant Governor, and five Representatives appointed by the Speaker.)

== Current composition ==
↓
12	18
Democratic	Republican

Affiliation	Party (shading indicates majority caucus)		Total	Vacant
Affiliation	Republican	Democratic	Total	Vacant
2011–12	19	12	31	0
2013–14	19	12	31	0
2015–16	20	11	31	0
2017–18	20	11	31	0
2019–20	19	12	31	0
2021–22	18	13	31	0
2023–24	19	12	31	0
Begin 2025	20	11	31	0
June 18, 2025	19	11	30	1
October 2, 2025	18	11	29	2
January 31, 2026	18	12	30	1
May 2, 2026	19	12	31	0
May 26, 2026	18	12	30	1
Latest voting share	60%	40%		

Senate districts and party affiliation after the 2024 election Republican Party Democratic Party

=== Current members, 2025–2027 ===
District	Name	Party	Born	Occupation(s)	Previous elective office(s)	Education	Assumed office	Next Election	Residence
1	Bryan Hughes	Republican	July 21, 1969 (age 57)	Attorney	Texas House	University of Texas at Tyler (BBA) Baylor University (JD)	January 10, 2017	2026	Mineola
2	Bob Hall	Republican	March 5, 1942 (age 84)	U.S. Air Force Captain Business Owner (Retired)	None	The Citadel (BS)	January 13, 2015	2026(retiring)	Edgewood
3	Robert Nichols	Republican	November 25, 1944 (age 81)	Engineer	Mayor of Jacksonville	Lamar University (BS)	January 9, 2007	2026	Jacksonville
4	Brett Ligon	Republican	October 6, 1968 (age 58)	Attorney	District Attorney of Montgomery County	Texas A&M University (BA) South Texas College of Law Houston (JD)	May 19, 2026 (Note: First elected in a special election.)	2026	Montgomery
5	Charles Schwertner	Republican	May 29, 1970 (age 56)	Orthopedic Surgeon	Texas House	University of Texas at Austin (BS) University of Texas Medical Branch at Galveston (MD)	January 8, 2013	2026	Georgetown
6	Carol Alvarado	Democratic	October 26, 1967 (age 59)	Small Business Owner	Texas House Houston City Council	University of Houston (BA, MBA)	December 21, 2018	2028	Houston
7	Paul Bettencourt	Republican	October 20, 1958 (age 68)	President and CEO, Bettencourt Tax Advisors L.L.C.	Tax Assessor-Collector of Harris County	Texas A&M University (BS)	January 13, 2015	2028	Houston
8	Angela Paxton	Republican	February 14, 1963 (age 63)	Leadership Consultant Teacher	None	Baylor University (BS) University of Texas, Clear Lake (MEd)	January 8, 2019	2028	McKinney
9	Taylor Rehmet	Democratic	July 17, 1992 (age 34)	Aerospace Machinist U.S. Air Force	None	None	February 19, 2026	2026	Fort Worth
10	Phil King	Republican	February 29, 1956 (age 70)	Attorney Small Business Owner	Texas House	Dallas Baptist University (BA, MBA) Texas Wesleyan University (JD)	January 10, 2023	2028	Weatherford
11	Mayes Middleton	Republican	September 18, 1981 (age 45)	President & CEO, Middleton Oil	Texas House	University of Texas at Austin (BA, JD)	January 10, 2023	2026 (retiring)	Galveston
12	Tan Parker	Republican	May 22, 1971 (age 55)	Businessman Entrepreneur	Texas House	University of Dallas (BA) London School of Economics (MS)	January 10, 2023	2028	Flower Mound
13	Borris Miles	Democratic	October 29, 1965 (age 61)	Insurance broker	Texas House	Sam Houston State University (BS)	January 10, 2017	2026	Houston
14	Sarah Eckhardt	Democratic	September 18, 1964 (age 62)	Attorney	Travis County Judge Travis County Commissioner	New York University (BFA) University of Texas at Austin (MPA, JD)	July 31, 2020	2028	Austin
15	Molly Cook	Democratic	June 6, 1991 (age 35)	Emergency room nurse Musician	None	University of Texas at Austin (BSN) Johns Hopkins University (MPH, MSN)	May 16, 2024	2028	Houston
16	Nathan Johnson	Democratic	February 12, 1968 (age 58)	Attorney Composer	None	University of Arizona (BS) University of Texas at Austin (JD)	January 8, 2019	2028	Dallas
17	Joan Huffman	Republican	August 17, 1956 (age 70)	Attorney	None	Louisiana State University (BA) South Texas College of Law (JD)	December 29, 2008	2028	Houston
18	Lois Kolkhorst	Republican	November 4, 1964 (age 62)	Business Owner	Texas House	Texas Christian University (BS)	December 22, 2014	2026	Brenham
19	Roland Gutierrez	Democratic	September 1, 1970 (age 56)	Attorney	Texas House San Antonio City Council	University of Texas at San Antonio (BA) St. Mary's University (JD)	January 12, 2021	2026	San Antonio
20	Juan Hinojosa	Democratic	March 7, 1946 (age 80)	Attorney U.S. Marine Corps	Texas House	University of Texas, Pan American (BS) Georgetown University (JD)	January 14, 2003	2028	McAllen
21	Judith Zaffirini	Democratic	February 13, 1946 (age 80)	Communications Specialist Educator	None	University of Texas at Austin (BS, MA, PhD) University of Houston Laredo Junior College	January 13, 1987	2026	Laredo
22	Vacant							2026	
23	Royce West	Democratic	September 26, 1952 (age 74)	Attorney	None	University of Texas at Arlington (BA, MA) University of Houston (JD)	January 12, 1993	2028	Dallas
24	Pete Flores	Republican	January 30, 1960 (age 66)	Game Warden	Texas Senate	Texas A&M University (BA) Laredo Junior College	January 10, 2023	2026	Pleasanton
25	Donna Campbell	Republican	September 17, 1954 (age 72)	Emergency Room Physician	None	University of Central Oklahoma (BSN) Texas Women's University (MSN) Texas Tech University (MD)	January 8, 2013	2028	New Braunfels
26	Jose Menendez	Democratic	March 11, 1969 (age 57)	Vice President, Stewart Title Guaranty	Texas House San Antonio City Council	Southern Methodist University (BBA, BA)	March 4, 2015	2026	San Antonio
27	Adam Hinojosa	Republican	October 19, 1976 (age 50)	Small Business Owner	None	Del Mar College	January 14, 2025	2028	Corpus Christi
28	Charles Perry	Republican	March 9, 1962 (age 64)	Certified Public Accountant	Texas House	Texas Tech University (BBA)	September 30, 2014	2026	Lubbock
29	Cesar Blanco	Democratic	April 23, 1976 (age 50)	Consultant U.S. Navy	Texas House	University of Texas at El Paso (BA)	January 12, 2021	2028	El Paso
30	Brent Hagenbuch	Republican	March 22, 1960 (age 66)	Owner & Chairman, Titus Transport, Inc. U.S. Navy	None	United States Naval Academy (BS) Stanford University (MS) University of California, Los Angeles (MBA)	January 14, 2025	2028	Denton
31	Kevin Sparks	Republican	May 10, 1964 (age 62)	Oil and Gas Operator	None	University of Texas at Austin (BBA)	January 10, 2023	2026	Midland

== Past composition of the Senate ==
The Senate was continuously held by Democrats from the end of the Reconstruction era until the Seventy-fifth Texas Legislature was seated in 1997, at which point Republicans took control. The Republican Party has maintained its control of the Senate since then.

=== Obsolete districts ===
- Texas Senate, District F (1846–1848)
- Texas Senate, District 32 (1853–1866)
- Texas Senate, District 33 (1853–1866)

=== Notable past members ===
- Edward Clark, Lieutenant Governor of Texas (1859–1861), Governor of Texas (1861).
- Wayne Connally, Senator from Wilson County (1967–1973), brother of Governor John Connally.
- Lloyd Doggett, Texas Supreme Court Justice (1989–1994), U.S. House of Representatives (1995–present).
- Robert L. Duncan, State Senator from Lubbock, 1996–2014; Chancellor of the Texas Tech University System, 2014-2018.
- Chet Edwards, U.S. House of Representatives (1991–2011).
- Pat Fallon, U.S. House of Representatives (2021–present).
- James W. Flanagan, U.S. Senate (1870–1875).
- Sylvia Garcia, U.S. House of Representatives (2019–present).
- Glenn Hegar, Texas Comptroller of Public Accounts (2015–2025).
- John Ireland, Texas Supreme Court Justice (1876), Governor of Texas (1883–1887).
- Eddie Bernice Johnson, U.S. House of Representatives (1993–2023).
- Rienzi Melville Johnston, U.S. Senate (1913).
- Barbara Jordan, U.S. House of Representatives (1973–1979).
- Earle Bradford Mayfield, U.S. Senate (1923–1929).
- William Neff "Bill" Patman, Senator from Jackson County (1961–1981), U.S. House of Representatives (1981–1985).
- Dan Patrick, current Lieutenant Governor of Texas (2015–present).
- Jerry E. Patterson, Commissioner of the Texas General Land Office (2003–2015).
- Lawrence Sullivan Ross, Governor of Texas, (1887–1891).
- Joseph D. Sayers, Lieutenant Governor of Texas (1879–1881), U.S. House of Representatives (1885–1899), Governor of Texas (1899–1903).
- Phillip Barry Miller, Lieutenant Governor of Texas (1925–1931), Candidate for Governor of Texas, 1932).
- Allan Shivers, Lieutenant Governor of Texas (1946–1949), Governor of Texas (1949–1957).
- Preston Smith, Governor of Texas (1969–1973).
- Frank Tejeda, U.S. House of Representatives (1993–1997).
- James W. Throckmorton, Governor of Texas (1866–1867), U.S. House of Representatives (1875–1879, 1883–1887).
- Carlos Truan, Senator from Corpus Christi (1977–2003); author of Texas Bilingual Education Act.
- Jim Turner, U.S. House of Representatives (1997–2005).
- Matthias Ward, U.S. Senate (1858–1859).
- Kirk Watson, Mayor of Austin (1997–2001, 2023–present).
- Ferdinand C. Weinert, Texas House and Texas Senate (1893–1935), Texas Secretary of State (1913).
- Louis Wigfall, U.S. Senate (1859–1861).
- Charles Wilson, U.S. House of Representatives (1973–1997).
- Roy Blake, Sr., Senator from Nacogdoches County, Texas, (1978–1989), President Pro Tempore (1987–1989).

== See also ==
- Texas Legislature
- Texas House of Representatives
- List of presidents pro tempore of the Texas Senate
- List of Texas state legislatures
- Texas Government Newsletter, voting history of the Texas Legislature.
