= Patriot Mobile =

American virtual cell network operator

- Founded: 2013
- Founder: Glenn Story
- Headquarters: Grapevine, Texas, United States
- Owner: Glenn Story
- Website: https://www.patriotmobile.com/

Patriot Mobile is an American mobile virtual network operator (MVNO) based in Grapevine, Texas. The company uses AT&T, T-Mobile, and Verizon to deliver wireless services on 4G and 5G networks. Patriot Mobile has described itself as "America's only Christian, conservative wireless provider," and is notable for its financial support of conservative political causes. The company was estimated in 2022 to have just under 100,000 subscribers.

The company has been compared to CREDO Mobile, an MVNO with a similar business model that donates to progressive political causes.

== History ==
Patriot Mobile was established in 2013 by Glenn Story. offering cellular services to individuals who prioritize constitutional freedoms, religious liberty, and "traditional American values".

In May 2024, TechCrunch revealed that Patriot Mobile was subject to a data breach that included subscribers' full names, email addresses, home ZIP codes, and account PINs. According to TechCrunch, a bug on Patriot Mobile's public website also appeared to be leaking some of the same personal information. As of 2025, Patriot Mobile had not publicly acknowledged the breach.

== Services ==
Patriot Mobile's website claims to provide coverage across the US through the use of the three major wireless network's towers, although in February 2022 the company tweeted that they leased access from T-Mobile and AT&T's networks.

== Political donations ==
In 2022, Patriot Mobile created Patriot Mobile Action, a political action committee, initially funded with about $650,000 in cash and in-kind contributions. The purpose of this PAC was to support candidates in school board races in Fort Worth, Texas, part of a broader strategy to "stand against [the] leftist indoctrination" that Patriot Mobile Action posited was taking place in public schools.

In 2022, all 11 school board candidates endorsed and financially backed by Patriot Mobile won their races. As of the 2025-2026 school year, only four of the 11 remained on their respective school boards, with five losing their 2025 re-election bids and one resigning in 2024 after controversy for allowing a religious documentary crew to film students without parental consent.

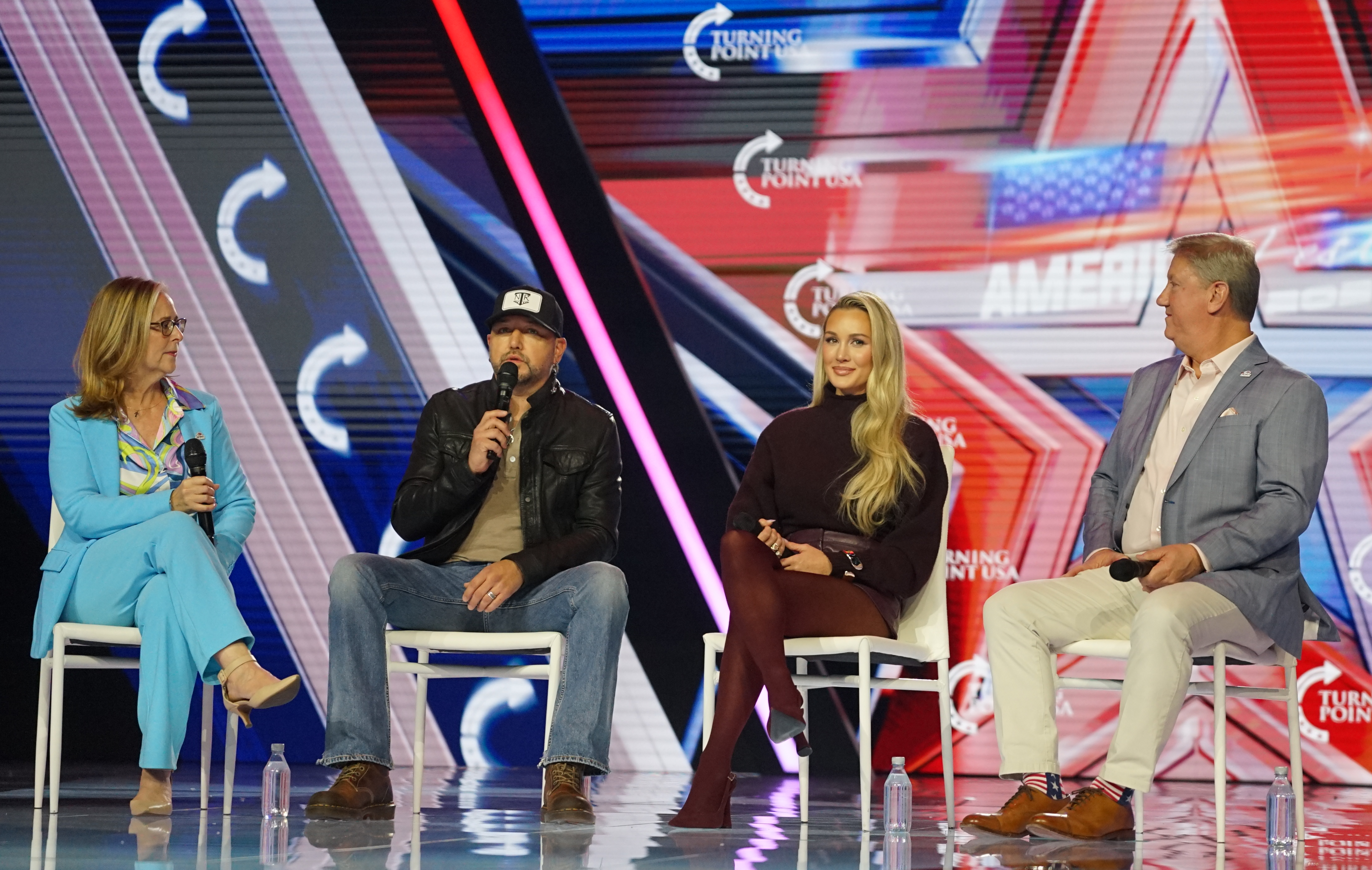
Jenny Story, Jason Aldean, Brittany Aldean, Glenn Story at AmericaFest 2025

The company's involvement in local elections attracted statewide and national attention. The PAC was credited with helping to reshape several suburban school boards in the Dallas-Fort Worth metroplex, including Keller ISD, Mansfield ISD and Grapevine-Colleyville ISD, by supporting candidates who favored policies to restrict classroom discussions of race, gender identity, and sexuality. Supporters viewed these efforts as promoting parental control in education, while critics said they injected partisan politics into nonpartisan school board elections. The company's political activities led to public pressure on wireless carriers like T-Mobile to reconsider their business relationships with Patriot Mobile.

The company also supports various other conservative organizations and initiatives. The company describes its donations as being centered around what it refers to as its "Four Pillars of Giving": the First Amendment; the Second Amendment; sanctity of life; and military veterans and first responders.

Some of the notable organizations listed on Patriot Mobile's website as causes that it supports include:

- Turning Point USA
- Concerned Women for America
- CPAC
- First Liberty Institute
- National Rifle Association
- Gun Owners of America
- Susan B. Anthony Pro-Life America

== See also ==
- Trump Mobile
