= Texas Government Newsletter =

- Type: Weekly
- Format: Newsletter
- Editor: Charles W. Deaton ('73-'79), Donald G. Martin ('79-'83), Thomas L. Whatley ('83-'96)
- Founded: 1975
- Political alignment: Nonpartisan
- ISSN: 0164-9221
- Website: None

Texas Government Newsletter (TGN) was originally published 40 times a year during the regular college school year, as a weekly publication edited primarily for college students who are taking Texas Government courses. The publication is typically subscribed to by college Texas-Government professors on behalf of their students to keep their students abreast of current events, politics, and the Texas Legislature. Each issue is devoted one-half to current events of the week related to the Government of Texas and politics, and the other half to an in-depth look at a single current topic.

The publication was founded in 1973 by Charles W. Deaton (Publisher and Editor), an observer of Texas government and politics, and author of "The Year They Threw The Rascals Out". It was then sold in 1979 to businessman and writer Donald G. Martin, and then in 1983 to Thomas L. Whatley, currently Director of the House Research Organization. In 1996 Whatley sold the publication to a group of owners who changed the name to Texas Government News and changed the format of the newsletter.

The original publication and its articles are still routinely referred to in numerous college government textbooks and other publications such as Texas State Historical Association publications, and the Institute of Public Affairs at the University of Texas.

In addition, each biennium TGN published a new issue of the "Voter's Guide" series of periodicals on the Texas Legislature recapping the most important votes of the legislative session.
