= 1996 Texas Senate election =

- November 5, 1996; December 10, 1996 (District 28 runoff)

15 of the 31 seats in the Texas Senate 16 seats needed for a majority
| | Majority party | Minority party |
|---|---|---|
| Party | Republican | Democratic |
| Last election | 14 | 17 |
| Seats won | 16 | 15 |
| Seat change | ▲2 | ▼2 |
| Popular vote | 1,347,551 | 966,719 |
| Percentage | 57.00% | 40.89% |
| Swing | ▲5.58% | ▼6.06% |
- Senate results by district Republican hold Republican gain Democratic hold No election
President Pro Tempore before election
Democratic
Elected President Pro Tempore
Republican

The 1996 Texas Senate elections took place as part of the biennial United States elections. Texas voters elected state senators in 15 State Senate districts. All of the seats up for this election were for four-year terms, with senators up for re-election in the 2000 elections. The winners of this election served in the 75th Texas Legislature.

== Background ==
Democrats had controlled the Texas Senate since the 1872 elections. The 1992 elections had been held under lines drawn by federal courts, which had overturned the maps passed by the legislature as unconstitutional gerrymanders. Democrats had tried to pass their own maps for the courts to allow in a January 1992 special session, but the courts rejected these maps and imposed their own. Republicans made substantial gains in the 1992 elections, winning 13 seats to the Democrats' 18.

The 1994 elections were held under the lines passed by the legislature in the January 1992 special session. Because that map was completely different from the 1992 map, all senators were required to run for re-election, instead of only half of them. During these elections, Republicans made further gains, winning 14 seats to the Democrats' 17, but they failed to take control of the chamber, even amidst the Republican Revolution which saw the election of George W. Bush to the governorship and Republicans winning majorities on the Supreme Court, Board of Education, and Railroad Commission.

=== Redistricting ===
Minor redistricting took place between the 1994 and 1996 elections due to the federal court case Thomas v. Bush. Multiple Senate districts in Dallas and Houston were challenged as unconstitutional racial gerrymanders. The parties settled the case in 1995, which resulted in minor changes to these districts, making them much more compact while negligibly changing their racial and partisan makeups.

== Results ==
The initial November elections had left a 15–15 tie in the chamber, with one special election in West Texas-based District 28 outstanding. Republicans won the race in a December runoff, securing a majority in the chamber for the first time since Reconstruction. This created a divided government between the Democratic-controlled House of Representatives and the Republican-controlled Senate and governorship leading into the 75th Legislature.

=== Results by district ===
| District | Democratic | | Republican | | Others | | Total | | Result |
| District | Votes | % | Votes | % | Votes | % | Votes | % | Result |
|---|---|---|---|---|---|---|---|---|---|
| District 2 | 82,580 | 52.17% | 75,704 | 47.83% | - | - | 158,284 | 100.00% | Democratic hold |
| District 3 | 103,835 | 49.91% | 104,222 | 50.09% | - | - | 208,057 | 100.00% | Democratic hold |
| District 7 | - | - | 182,144 | 100.00% | - | - | 182,144 | 100.00% | Republican hold |
| District 8 | - | - | 189,985 | 89.76% | 21,674 | 10.24% | 211,659 | 100.00% | Republican hold |
| District 9 | - | - | 160,296 | 100.00% | - | - | 160,296 | 100.00% | Republican hold |
| District 10 | - | - | 154,989 | 100.00% | - | - | 154,989 | 100.00% | Republican hold |
| District 12 | 112,733 | 100.00% | - | - | - | - | 112,733 | 100.00% | Democratic hold |
| District 14 | 157,194 | 84.87% | - | - | 28,013 | 15.13% | 185,207 | 100.00% | Democratic hold |
| District 15 | 81,134 | 62.05% | 49,619 | 37.95% | - | - | 130,753 | 100.00% | Democratic hold |
| District 21 | 91,956 | 66.32% | 46,698 | 33.68% | - | - | 138,654 | 100.00% | Democratic hold |
| District 24 | 80,632 | 48.15% | 86,828 | 51.85% | - | - | 167,460 | 100.00% | Republican gain |
| District 25 | - | - | 223,739 | 100.00% | - | - | 223,739 | 100.00% | Republican hold |
| District 26 | 85,922 | 67.54% | 41,298 | 32.46% | - | - | 127,220 | 100.00% | Democratic hold |
| District 27 | 80,865 | 100.00% | - | - | - | - | 80,865 | 100.00% | Democratic hold |
| District 29 | 89,868 | 73.72% | 32,029 | 26.28% | - | - | 121,897 | 100.00% | Republican hold |
| Total | 966,719 | 40.89% | 1,347,551 | 57.00% | 49,687 | 2.10% | 2,363,957 | 100.00% | Source: |

== Notable races ==
=== District 3 ===
Incumbent Republican Drew Nixon ran for re-election. Nixon faced multiple controversies during his first term in office, including a 1993 arrest for possession of an unlicensed firearm while in his car with three prostitutes. His opponent, Democrat Jerry K. Johnson, also attacked him for taking a vacation to Greece during the campaign. Nixon ultimately won re-election, but by a surprisingly narrow margin.

District 3 general election
| Party | Candidate | Votes | % |
|---|---|---|---|
| Republican | Drew Nixon | 104,222 | 50.09% |
| Democratic | Jerry K. Johnson | 103,835 | 49.91% |
| Total votes | | 208,057 | 100.00% |
| Republican hold | | | |

=== District 24 ===
Incumbent Democrat Bill Sims announced he would not run for re-election after suffering a stroke in 1995. Republican Troy Fraser, whom Sims had defeated in the 1992 election, won the open seat against Democrat Rick Rhodes, the mayor of Streetwater, flipping the seat to the Republicans.

District 24 general election
| Party | Candidate | Votes | % |
|---|---|---|---|
| Republican | Troy Fraser | 86,828 | 51.85% |
| Democratic | Rick Rhodes | 80,632 | 48.15% |
| Total votes | | 148,443 | 100.00% |
| Republican gain from Democratic | | | |

=== District 28 (special) ===
28th district special election
- December 10, 1996
| Nominee | Robert L. Duncan | David R. Langston |
| Party | Republican | Democratic |
| Popular vote | 32,489 | 24,686 |
| Percentage | 56.82% | 43.18% |
- County results Duncan: 50–60% 60–70% 70–80% Langston: 50–60% 60–70% Tie: 50%
Texas Senator before election
John T. Montford
Democratic Party
Elected Texas Senator
Robert L. Duncan
Republican Party

Incumbent Democrat John T. Montford resigned to become the first chancellor of the Texas Tech University System. No candidate received a majority of the vote in the first round, held concurrently with the general election, so a runoff was to be held on December 10. Due to the tie created by the general election, this runoff would decide control of the Texas Senate. Republican Robert Duncan defeated Democrat David Langston in the runoff, flipping the seat and giving Republicans control of the chamber for the first time since Reconstruction.

District 28 special election
| Party | Candidate | Votes | % |
|---|---|---|---|
| Republican | Robert Duncan | 45,106 | 30.41% |
| Democratic | David R. Langston | 36,032 | 24.29% |
| Republican | Tim Lambert | 18,885 | 12.73% |
| Democratic | Gary L. Watkins | 18,652 | 12.57% |
| Republican | Monte Hasie | 13,303 | 8.97% |
| Democratic | Lorenzo 'Bubba' Sedeno | 12,419 | 8.37% |
| Republican | Dick Bowen | 3,938 | 2.65% |
| Total votes | | 148,335 | 100.00% |

District 28 special election runoff
| Party | Candidate | Votes | % |
|---|---|---|---|
| Republican | Robert Duncan | 32,489 | 56.82% |
| Democratic | David R. Langston | 24,686 | 43.18% |
| Total votes | | 57,175 | 100.00% |
| Republican gain from Democratic | | | |
