= 1998 Texas Senate election =

- November 3, 1998

16 of the 31 seats in the Texas Senate 16 seats needed for a majority
	Majority party	Minority party
Party	Republican	Democratic
Last election	16	15
Seats before	17	14
Seats won	16	15
Seat change	▼1	▲1
Popular vote	917,623	659,753
Percentage	58.17%	41.83%
Swing	▲1.17%	▲0.94%
- Senate results by district Republican hold Democratic hold Democratic gain No election
President Pro Tempore before election
Republican
Elected President Pro Tempore
Republican

The 1998 Texas Senate elections took place as part of the biennial United States elections. Texas voters elected state senators in 16 State Senate districts. All of the seats up for this election were for four-year terms, with senators up for re-election in the 2002 elections. The winners of this election served in the 76th Texas Legislature.

== Background ==
The 1996 elections had initially left the Senate with a 15–15 tie between the Republicans and the Democrats, with one outstanding special election runoff in the West Texas-based 28th district. Republicans won the December runoff, winning a majority of seats and breaking over 100 years of continuous Democratic control of the chamber.

=== District 5 special election ===
Democratic Senator Jim Turner resigned his seat after winning a seat in the U.S. House of Representatives in the 1996 elections. A special election was held for his seat in January 1997, which Republican Steve Ogden won, flipping the district and expanding the Republicans' newfound majority.

1997 District 5 special election
Party	Candidate	Votes	%
Republican	Steve Ogden	21,245	55.46%
Democratic	Mary M. Moore	17,062	44.54%
Total votes		38,307	100.00%
Republican gain from Democratic			

== Results ==
Despite Republican governor George W. Bush's landslide re-election, his party only won a narrow 16–15 majority in the Senate. Democrats gained one seat in the chamber, with David Bernsen's victory in Beaumont-based 4th district. Bernsen defeated incumbent Republican Michael Galloway, who himself had flipped the seat in an upset victory in 1994.

=== Results by district ===
District	Democratic		Republican		Total		Result
District	Votes	%	Votes	%	Votes	%	Result
District 1	-	-	90,024	100.00%	90,024	100.00%	Republican hold
District 4	76,540	55.15%	62,237	44.85%	138,777	100.00%	Democratic gain
District 5	61,508	44.33%	77,227	55.67%	138,735	100.00%	Republican hold
District 6	37,746	100.00%	-	-	37,746	100.00%	Democratic hold
District 11	47,696	42.90%	63,492	57.10%	111,188	100.00%	Republican hold
District 13	86,631	100.00%	-	-	86,631	100.00%	Democratic hold
District 16	-	-	80,802	100.00%	80,802	100.00%	Republican hold
District 17	40,331	29.40%	96,846	70.60%	137,177	100.00%	Republican hold
District 18	85,291	59.44%	58,195	40.56%	143,486	100.00%	Democratic hold
District 19	55,544	100.00%	-	-	55,544	100.00%	Democratic hold
District 20	57,298	58.09%	41,338	41.91%	98,636	100.00%	Democratic hold
District 22	-	-	83,933	100.00%	83,933	100.00%	Republican hold
District 23	61,685	100.00%	-	-	61,685	100.00%	Democratic hold
District 28	-	-	82,368	100.00%	82,368	100.00%	Republican hold
District 30	49,483	37.35%	82,996	62.65%	132,479	100.00%	Republican hold
District 31	-	-	98,165	100.00%	98,165	100.00%	Republican hold
Total	659,753	41.83%	917,623	58.17%	1,577,376	100.00%	Source:
