= 1992 Texas Senate election =

- November 3, 1992

All 31 seats in the Texas Senate 16 seats needed for a majority
	Majority party	Minority party
Party	Democratic	Republican
Last election	23	8
Seats before	22	9
Seats won	18	13
Seat change	▼4	▲4
Popular vote	2,725,616	2,400,175
Percentage	51.50%	45.35%
- Senate results by district Democratic hold Republican hold Republican gain
President Pro Tempore before election
Democratic
Elected President Pro Tempore
Democratic

The 1992 Texas Senate elections took place as part of the biennial United States elections. Texas voters elected state senators in all 31 State Senate districts due to redistricting. Originally, half of the seats were elected for two-year terms and the other half were elected for four-year terms, but subsequent redistricting forced all Senators to run for re-election again in 1994. The winners of this election served in the 73rd Texas Legislature.

== Background ==
Democrats had controlled the Texas Senate since the 1872 elections. They maintained their supermajority of 23 seats in the 1990 election, but they lost one seat soon after. Democratic Senator Chet Edwards resigned following his election to the U.S. House of Representatives. A special election was held in February 1991, which was won by Republican David Sibley, flipping the seat and reducing the Democratic supermajority to 22 seats.

1991 District 9 special election
Party	Candidate	Votes	%
Republican	David Sibley	28,757	53.21%
Democratic	Betty Denton	25,283	46.79%
Total votes		54,040	100.00%
Republican gain from Democratic			

=== Redistricting ===
Democrats had regained a full government trifecta following the election of Ann Richards to the governorship in 1990, giving them a substantial redistricting advantage following the 1990 census. The legislature drew maps for the Senate in its 1991 regular session, but federal courts struck them down as unconstitutional partisan gerrymanders. Democrats then tried to pass a new set of maps for the courts to allow in a January 1992 special session, but the courts rejected the Senate map and imposed their own.

Democrats took issue with the presence of Judge James Robertson Nowlin on the panel. Nowlin was a former Republican state representative who had taken part in the controversial 1981 redistricting. Nowlin would later admit to being in contact with multiple Republican House members concerning the districts the courts were drawing. Democrats sought Nowlin's recusal from the case because of this, but the plans had already been enacted by the time this had occurred.

== Results ==
The court-imposed maps were seen as highly favorable to Republicans, and they believed they had the opportunity to win the chamber for the first time sine Reconstruction under them. Republicans made substantial gains, winning four seats from the Democrats, breaking their supermajority, but they failed to win control.

=== Results by district ===
District	Democratic		Republican		Libertarian		Total		Result
District	Votes	%	Votes	%	Votes	%	Votes	%	Result
District 1	93,937	47.87%	102,310	52.13%	-	-	196,247	100.00%	Republican hold
District 2	96,746	40.08%	129,228	53.54%	15,384	6.37%	241,358	100.00%	Republican gain
District 3	117,709	53.86%	100,826	46.14%	-	-	218,535	100.00%	Democratic hold
District 4	114,999	54.57%	95,741	45.43%	-	-	210,740	100.00%	Democratic hold
District 5	134,875	100.00%	-	-	-	-	134,875	100.00%	Democratic hold
District 6	64,669	42.48%	87,570	57.52%	-	-	152,239	100.00%	Republican gain
District 7	-	-	178,850	89.09%	21,910	10.91%	200,760	100.00%	Republican hold
District 8	-	-	169,173	82.66%	35,483	17.34%	204,656	100.00%	Republican hold
District 9	73,759	39.44%	113,246	60.56%	-	-	187,005	100.00%	Republican hold
District 10	83,711	38.64%	132,947	61.36%	-	-	216,658	100.00%	Republican hold
District 11	92,702	46.24%	98,671	49.21%	9,121	4.55%	200,494	100.00%	Republican gain
District 12	101,823	100.00%	-	-	-	-	101,823	100.00%	Democratic hold
District 13	135,262	91.41%	-	-	12,713	8.59%	147,975	100.00%	Democratic hold
District 14	172,384	67.61%	73,729	28.92%	8,837	3.47%	254,950	100.00%	Democratic hold
District 15	69,844	69.88%	25,660	25.67%	4,438	4.44%	99,942	100.00%	Democratic hold
District 16	-	-	144,908	80.85%	34,325	19.15%	179,233	100.00%	Republican hold
District 17	82,468	40.40%	121,676	59.60%	-	-	204,144	100.00%	Republican hold
District 18	113,729	59.66%	76,905	40.34%	-	-	190,634	100.00%	Democratic hold
District 19	86,742	50.95%	76,967	45.21%	6,551	3.85%	170,260	100.00%	Democratic hold
District 20	102,405	100.00%	-	-	-	-	102,405	100.00%	Democratic hold
District 21	111,398	100.00%	-	-	-	-	111,398	100.00%	Democratic hold
District 22	92,113	39.70%	139,901	60.30%	-	-	232,014	100.00%	Republican gain
District 23	110,856	89.46%	-	-	13,066	10.54%	123,922	100.00%	Democratic hold
District 24	110,534	100.00%	-	-	-	-	110,534	100.00%	Democratic hold
District 25	98,763	51.74%	92,107	48.26%	-	-	190,870	100.00%	Democratic hold
District 26	73,303	33.40%	146,159	66.60%	-	-	219,462	100.00%	Republican hold
District 27	80,961	100.00%	-	-	-	-	80,961	100.00%	Democratic hold
District 28	111,384	64.36%	57,119	33.00%	4,572	2.64%	173,075	100.00%	Democratic hold
District 29	98,461	100.00%	-	-	-	-	98,461	100.00%	Democratic hold
District 30	100,079	50.73%	97,180	49.27%	-	-	197,259	100.00%	Democratic hold
District 31	-	-	139,302	100.00%	-	-	139,302	100.00%	Republican hold
Total	2,725,616	51.50%	2,400,175	45.35%	166,400	3.14%	5,292,191	100.00%	Source:
