= Texas–Texas Tech football rivalry =

American college football rivalry

Battle For The Chancellor's Spurs
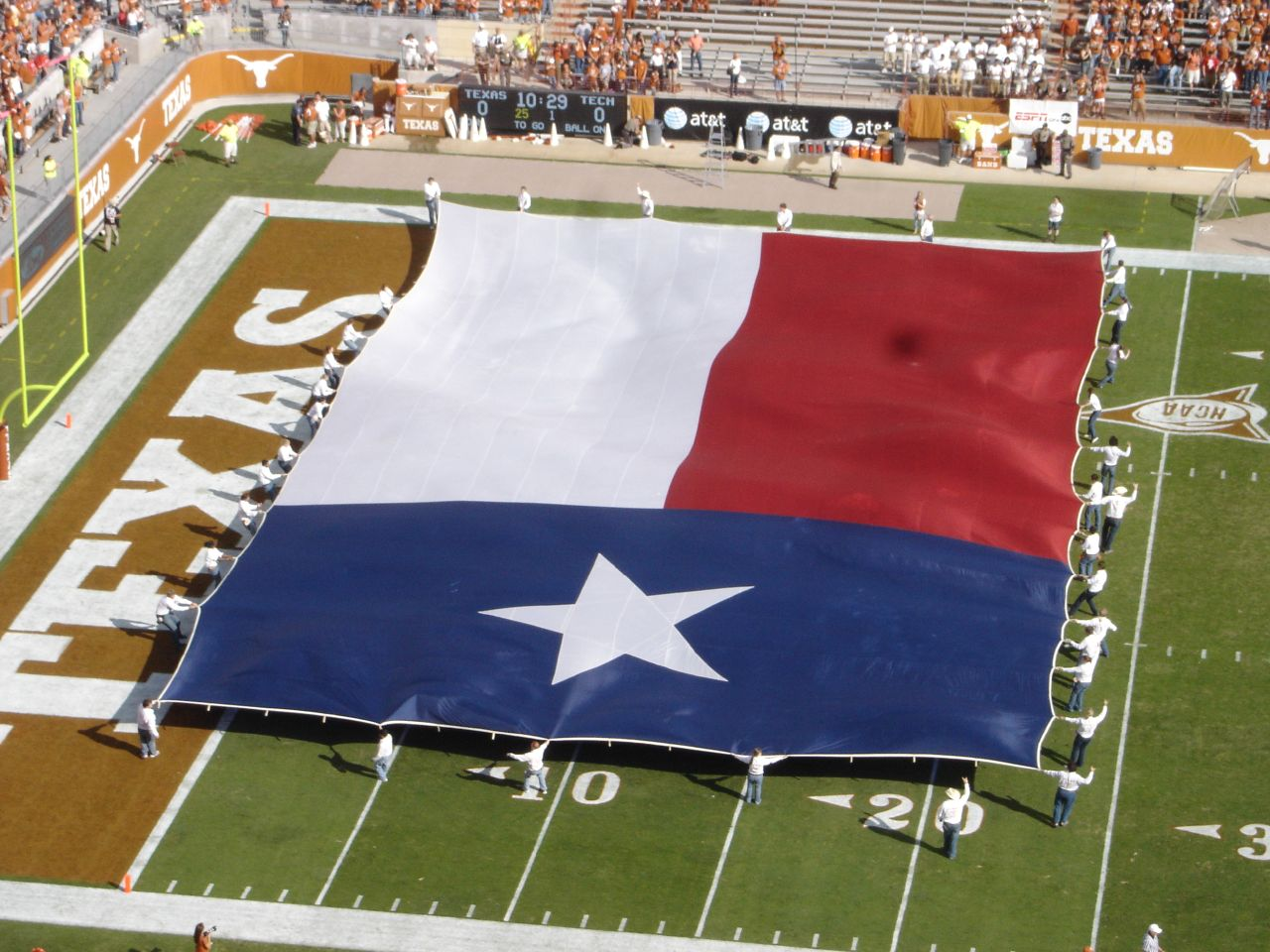
- Texas and Texas Tech facing off in 2007.

- Texas Longhorns Texas Tech Red Raiders
- First meeting: October 6, 1928; Texas 12, Texas Tech 0
- Latest meeting: November 24, 2023; Texas 57, Texas Tech 7
- Stadiums: Darrell K Royal–Texas Memorial Stadium (Texas); Jones AT&T Stadium (Texas Tech)
- Trophy: Chancellor's Spurs

Statistics
- Total meetings: 73
- All-time series: Texas leads, 55–18 (75.3%)
- Trophy series: Texas leads, 21–6
- Largest victory: Texas: 58–7 (1999); Texas Tech: 33–9 (1994)
- Longest win streak: Texas, 8 (1958–1966)
- Current win streak: Texas, 1 (2023–present)

Locations of Texas Tech and Texas

The Texas–Texas Tech football rivalry is an American college football rivalry between the Texas Longhorns and the Texas Tech Red Raiders. The winner of this gauntlet receives the other university's chancellor's sterling silver boot spurs which is what the name of the rivalry is named after. The Battle For The Chancellor's Spurs was played uninterrupted between the 1960 to 2023 college football seasons. Since Texas joined the SEC, the future of this game has remained uncertain.

== Chancellor's Spurs ==
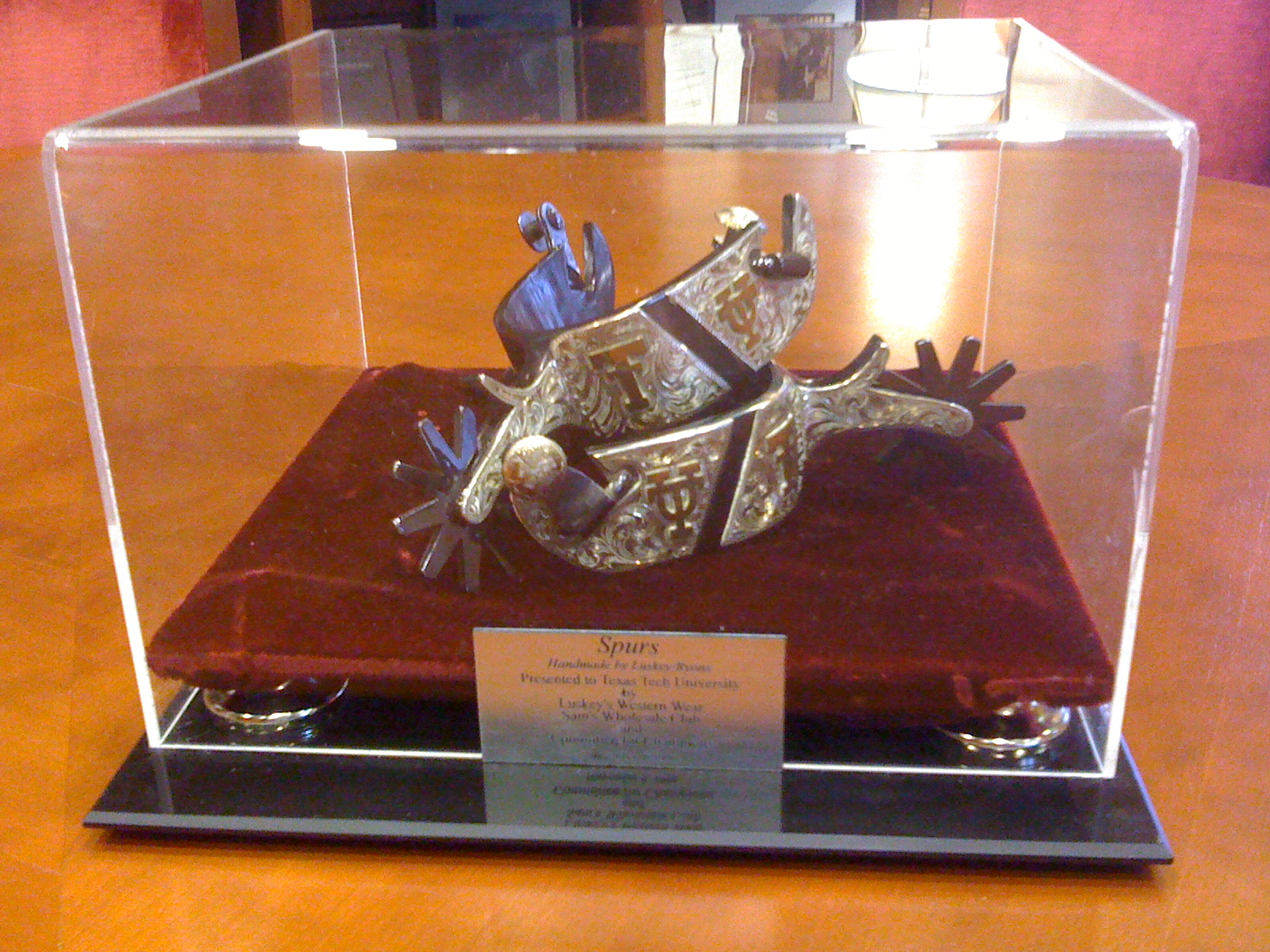
The Chancellor's Spurs on display

The Chancellor's Spurs is the trophy awarded to the winner of the game. The trophy is a set of spurs exchanged between the chancellors of the University of Texas System and Texas Tech University System. The teams first played during the 1928 season and have played annually since 1960 when Texas Tech began participating in the Southwest Conference. The tradition of a "traveling trophy" between the two universities began during the 1996 season when, for the first time, both universities' administration included a chancellor position; the Texas Tech University System was established and the system's first chancellor, John T. Montford, started the exchange of the Chancellor's Spurs between the two universities. The 46th meeting between the teams marked the first game the winner would receive the Chancellor's Spurs. The spurs are gold and silver and engraved with Texas Tech's Double T and Texas' interlocking UT logo.

== History ==
The first meeting took place in 1928, which Texas won 12–0. The Longhorns and Red Raiders only faced each other nine times until 1960. Since 1960, both teams have played annually as members of the Southwest Conference through 1995 and from 1996 as charter members of the Big 12 Conference. The 2008 game was one of three games that led to a 3-way tie controversy in the Big 12 Conference South Division. Texas leads the series 52–17; the Longhorns are 19–7 against the Red Raiders since 1994. Texas Tech's 48–45 victory in 2015 was their first in Austin since 1997. It also ended the Longhorns' six-game winning streak. The Red Raiders' 37–34 victory in overtime on September 24, 2022, is their first victory in Lubbock since 2008. The rivalry ended with Texas' departure to the SEC conference, and a 57–7 victory in their favor.

== Game results ==
| Texas victories | Texas Tech victories |

| No. | Date | Location | Winning team | | Losing team | |
|---|---|---|---|---|---|---|
| 1 | October 6, 1928 | Austin | Texas | 12 | Texas Tech | 0 |
| 2 | September 22, 1934 | Lubbock | Texas | 12 | Texas Tech | 6 |
| 3 | September 25, 1937 | Austin | Texas | 25 | Texas Tech | 12 |
| 4 | October 6, 1945 | Austin | Texas | 33 | Texas Tech | 0 |
| 5 | September 20, 1947 | Austin | Texas | 33 | Texas Tech | 0 |
| 6 | September 17, 1949 | Austin | Texas | 43 | Texas Tech | 0 |
| 7 | September 23, 1950 | Lubbock | #5 Texas | 28 | Texas Tech | 14 |
| 8 | September 17, 1955 | Austin | Texas Tech | 20 | Texas | 14 |
| 9 | October 4, 1958 | Austin | #17 Texas | 12 | Texas Tech | 7 |
| 10 | October 1, 1960 | Austin | #13 Texas | 17 | Texas Tech | 0 |
| 11 | September 30, 1961 | Austin | #6 Texas | 42 | Texas Tech | 14 |
| 12 | September 29, 1962 | Lubbock | #3 Texas | 34 | Texas Tech | 0 |
| 13 | September 28, 1963 | Austin | #4 Texas | 49 | Texas Tech | 7 |
| 14 | September 26, 1964 | Lubbock | #4 Texas | 23 | Texas Tech | 0 |
| 15 | September 25, 1965 | Austin | #3 Texas | 33 | Texas Tech | 7 |
| 16 | September 24, 1966 | Lubbock | #6 Texas | 31 | Texas Tech | 21 |
| 17 | September 30, 1967 | Austin | Texas Tech | 19 | #8 Texas | 13 |
| 18 | September 28, 1968 | Lubbock | Texas Tech | 31 | #6 Texas | 22 |
| 19 | September 27, 1969 | Austin | #4 Texas | 49 | Texas Tech | 7 |
| 20 | September 26, 1970 | Lubbock | #2 Texas | 35 | Texas Tech | 13 |
| 21 | September 25, 1971 | Austin | #3 Texas | 28 | Texas Tech | 0 |
| 22 | September 30, 1972 | Lubbock | #12 Texas | 25 | Texas Tech | 20 |
| 23 | September 29, 1973 | Austin | #14 Texas | 28 | Texas Tech | 12 |
| 24 | September 28, 1974 | Lubbock | Texas Tech | 26 | #6 Texas | 3 |
| 25 | September 27, 1975 | Austin | #6 Texas | 42 | Texas Tech | 18 |
| 26 | October 30, 1976 | Lubbock | #6 Texas Tech | 31 | #15 Texas | 28 |
| 27 | October 29, 1977 | Austin | #1 Texas | 26 | #14 Texas Tech | 0 |
| 28 | September 30, 1978 | Lubbock | #6 Texas | 24 | Texas Tech | 7 |
| 29 | November 3, 1979 | Austin | #8 Texas | 14 | Texas Tech | 6 |
| 30 | November 1, 1980 | Lubbock | Texas Tech | 24 | #12 Texas | 20 |
| 31 | October 31, 1981 | Austin | #6 Texas | 26 | Texas Tech | 9 |
| 32 | October 30, 1982 | Lubbock | Texas | 27 | Texas Tech | 0 |
| 33 | October 29, 1983 | Austin | #2 Texas | 20 | Texas Tech | 3 |
| 34 | November 3, 1984 | Lubbock | #2 Texas | 13 | Texas Tech | 10 |
| 35 | November 2, 1985 | Austin | Texas | 34 | Texas Tech | 21 |
| 36 | November 1, 1986 | Lubbock | Texas Tech | 23 | Texas | 21 |
| 37 | October 31, 1987 | Austin | Texas | 41 | Texas Tech | 27 |

| No. | Date | Location | Winning team | | Losing team | |
|---|---|---|---|---|---|---|
| 38 | October 29, 1988 | Lubbock | Texas Tech | 33 | Texas | 32 |
| 39 | November 4, 1989 | Austin | Texas Tech | 24 | #22 Texas | 17 |
| 40 | November 3, 1990 | Lubbock | #14 Texas | 41 | Texas Tech | 22 |
| 41 | November 2, 1991 | Austin | Texas | 23 | Texas Tech | 15 |
| 42 | October 31, 1992 | Lubbock | #25 Texas | 44 | Texas Tech | 33 |
| 43 | October 30, 1993 | Austin | Texas Tech | 31 | Texas | 22 |
| 44 | October 29, 1994 | Lubbock | Texas Tech | 33 | #19 Texas | 9 |
| 45 | November 4, 1995 | Austin | #13 Texas | 48 | #23 Texas Tech | 7 |
| 46 | November 9, 1996 | Lubbock | Texas | 38 | Texas Tech | 32 |
| 47 | November 8, 1997 | Austin | Texas Tech | 24 | Texas | 10 |
| 48 | November 14, 1998 | Lubbock | Texas Tech | 42 | #18 Texas | 35 |
| 49 | November 13, 1999 | Austin | #10 Texas | 58 | Texas Tech | 7 |
| 50 | November 4, 2000 | Lubbock | #20 Texas | 29 | Texas Tech | 17 |
| 51 | September 29, 2001 | Austin | #5 Texas | 42 | Texas Tech | 7 |
| 52 | November 16, 2002 | Lubbock | Texas Tech | 42 | #4 Texas | 38 |
| 53 | November 15, 2003 | Austin | #6 Texas | 43 | Texas Tech | 40 |
| 54 | October 23, 2004 | Lubbock | #8 Texas | 51 | #24 Texas Tech | 21 |
| 55 | October 22, 2005 | Austin | #2 Texas | 52 | #8 Texas Tech | 17 |
| 56 | October 28, 2006 | Lubbock | #5 Texas | 35 | Texas Tech | 31 |
| 57 | November 10, 2007 | Austin | #14 Texas | 59 | Texas Tech | 43 |
| 58 | November 1, 2008 | Lubbock | #7 Texas Tech | 39 | #1 Texas | 33 |
| 59 | September 19, 2009 | Austin | #2 Texas | 34 | Texas Tech | 24 |
| 60 | September 18, 2010 | Lubbock | #6 Texas | 24 | Texas Tech | 14 |
| 61 | November 5, 2011 | Austin | #25 Texas | 52 | Texas Tech | 20 |
| 62 | November 3, 2012 | Lubbock | #23 Texas | 31 | #18 Texas Tech | 22 |
| 63 | November 28, 2013 | Austin | Texas | 41 | Texas Tech | 16 |
| 64 | November 1, 2014 | Lubbock | Texas | 34 | Texas Tech | 13 |
| 65 | November 26, 2015 | Austin | Texas Tech | 48 | Texas | 45 |
| 66 | November 5, 2016 | Lubbock | Texas | 45 | Texas Tech | 37 |
| 67 | November 24, 2017 | Austin | Texas Tech | 27 | Texas | 23 |
| 68 | November 10, 2018 | Lubbock | #19 Texas | 41 | Texas Tech | 34 |
| 69 | November 29, 2019 | Austin | Texas | 49 | Texas Tech | 24 |
| 70 | September 26, 2020 | Lubbock | #8 Texas | 63 | Texas Tech | 56^{OT} |
| 71 | September 25, 2021 | Austin | Texas | 70 | Texas Tech | 35 |
| 72 | September 24, 2022 | Lubbock | Texas Tech | 37 | #22 Texas | 34^{OT} |
| 73 | November 24, 2023 | Austin | #7 Texas | 57 | Texas Tech | 7 |
Series: Texas leads 55–18

=== Results by location ===
As of November 24, 2023

| City | Games | Texas victories | Texas Tech victories |
|---|---|---|---|
| Austin | 40 | 33 | 7 |
| Lubbock | 33 | 22 | 11 |

== See also ==
- List of NCAA college football rivalry games
