= 2002 Texas Senate election =

- November 5, 2002

All of the 31 seats in the Texas Senate 16 seats needed for a majority
| | Majority party | Minority party |
|---|---|---|
| Party | Republican | Democratic |
| Seats before | 16 | 15 |
| Seats won | 19 | 12 |
| Seat change | ▲3 | ▼3 |
| Popular vote | 2,360,682 | 1,567,895 |
| Percentage | 57.77% | 38.37% |
| Swing | ▼7.31% | ▲6.64% |
- Senate results by district Republican hold Democratic hold Republican gain No election
President Pro Tempore before election
Republican
Elected President Pro Tempore
Republican

The 2002 Texas Senate elections took place as part of the biennial United States elections. Texas voters elected state senators in all 31 Senate districts. All of the seats up for this election, with half of the seats elected for two-year terms and the other half elected for four-year terms. The winners of this election served in the 78th Texas Legislature.

Following the 2000 elections, the Republicans maintained effective control of the Senate with sixteen members to the Democrats' fifteen.

To claim control of the chamber from Republicans, the Democrats needed to gain one seat. Instead, Republicans gained three seats.

== Background ==
The Republican Party had held the State Senate since the 1996 elections. Due to the state's divided government after Democrats maintained control of the Texas House of Representatives in the 2000 elections, neither party held control over the redistricting process. During the 2001 regular session, the divided legislature failed to pass any redistricting plans. The task then fell to the Legislative Redistricting Board after Republican governor Rick Perry did not call a special session. Republicans controlled four of the five seats on the board, so Democrats tried to convince the Republican members of the board to adopt a plan that would keep the partisan balance of the legislature intact. While Republican lieutenant governor Bill Ratliff was open to such a plan, the majority of the board pushed for a plan that heavily favored Republicans.

== Predictions ==
| Source | Ranking | As of |
|---|---|---|
| The Cook; Political Report | Likely R | October 4, 2002 |

== Results ==
Republicans major gains in the Texas Senate in 2002, flipping three seats from the Democrats. In addition to their victory in the concurrent elections for the Texas House, Republicans won a government trifecta for the first time since Reconstruction.

=== Statewide ===
Summary of the November 6, 2012 Texas Senate election results
| Party | Candidates | Votes | | Seats | | | | |
| Party | Candidates | No. | % | Before | Up | Won | After | +/– |
|---|---|---|---|---|---|---|---|---|
| Republican | 22 | 2,360,682 | 57.77% | 16 | 16 | 19 | 19 | ▲3 |
| Democratic | 22 | 1,567,895 | 38.37% | 15 | 15 | 12 | 12 | ▼3 |
| Libertarian | 16 | 157,565 | 3.86% | 0 | 0 | 0 | 0 | Steady |
| Total | | 4,086,142 | 100.00% | 31 | 31 | 31 | 31 | Steady |

Popular vote
| Republican | 57.77% |
| Democratic | 38.37% |
| Libertarian | 3.86% |

Senate seats won
| Republican | 61.29% |
| Democratic | 38.71% |

=== Close races ===
| District | Winner | Margin |
|---|---|---|
| District 18 | Democratic | 8.18% |
| District 2 | Republican (flip) | 9.38% |
| District 14 | Democratic | 9.58% |

=== Results by district ===
| District | Democratic | | Republican | | Libertarian | | Total | | Result |
| District | Votes | % | Votes | % | Votes | % | Votes | % | Result |
|---|---|---|---|---|---|---|---|---|---|
| District 1 | 53,201 | 31.83% | 133,939 | 68.17% | - | - | 167,140 | 100.00% | Republican hold |
| District 2 | 66,151 | 44.56% | 80,075 | 53.94% | 2,217 | 1.49% | 148,443 | 100.00% | Republican gain |
| District 3 | - | - | 119,993 | 88.23% | 16,001 | 11.77% | 135,994 | 100.00% | Republican hold |
| District 4 | 55,808 | 36.47% | 97,237 | 63.53% | - | - | 153,045 | 100.00% | Republican gain |
| District 5 | - | - | 122,119 | 86.86% | 18,482 | 13.14% | 140,601 | 100.00% | Republican hold |
| District 6 | 54,130 | 100.00% | - | - | - | - | 54,130 | 100.00% | Democratic hold |
| District 7 | - | - | 139,827 | 91.31% | 13,305 | 8.69% | 153,132 | 100.00% | Republican hold |
| District 8 | - | - | 135,927 | 89.75% | 15,525 | 10.25% | 151,452 | 100.00% | Republican hold |
| District 9 | 89,255 | 38.21% | 136,288 | 58.35% | - | - | 225,543 | 100.00% | Republican hold |
| District 10 | 69,038 | 39.93% | 101,511 | 58.71% | 2,367 | 1.37% | 172,916 | 100.00% | Republican hold |
| District 11 | - | - | 103,204 | 86.30% | 16,387 | 13.70% | 119,591 | 100.00% | Republican hold |
| District 12 | - | - | 121,991 | 89.83% | 13,818 | 10.17% | 135,809 | 100.00% | Republican gain |
| District 13 | 107,897 | 100.00% | - | - | - | - | 107,897 | 100.00% | Democratic hold |
| District 14 | 95,182 | 52.70% | 77,885 | 43.12% | 7,537 | 4.17% | 180,604 | 100.00% | Democratic hold |
| District 15 | 62,458 | 60.37% | 41,003 | 39.63% | - | - | 103,461 | 100.00% | Democratic hold |
| District 16 | 50,895 | 34.02% | 95,853 | 64.07% | 2,857 | 1.91% | 149,605 | 100.00% | Republican hold |
| District 17 | 55,502 | 38.57% | 88,393 | 61.43% | - | - | 143,895 | 100.00% | Republican hold |
| District 18 | 85,401 | 53.31% | 72,296 | 45.13% | 2,508 | 1.57% | 160,205 | 100.00% | Democratic hold |
| District 19 | 76,590 | 100.00% | - | - | - | - | 76,590 | 100.00% | Democratic hold |
| District 20 | 78,685 | 100.00% | - | - | - | - | 78,685 | 100.00% | Democratic hold |
| District 21 | 95,644 | 89.11% | - | - | 11,688 | 10.89% | 107,332 | 100.00% | Democratic hold |
| District 22 | 51,506 | 32.62% | 106,371 | 67.38% | - | - | 157,877 | 100.00% | Republican hold |
| District 23 | 101,793 | 100.00% | - | - | - | - | 101,793 | 100.00% | Democratic hold |
| District 24 | - | - | 122,355 | 90.47% | 12,887 | 9.53% | 135,242 | 100.00% | Republican hold |
| District 25 | 61,899 | 30.20% | 136,802 | 66.73% | 6,293 | 3.07% | 204,994 | 100.00% | Republican hold |
| District 26 | 74,163 | 100.00% | - | - | - | - | 74,163 | 100.00% | Democratic hold |
| District 27 | 61,382 | 100.00% | - | - | - | - | 61,382 | 100.00% | Democratic hold |
| District 28 | - | - | 119,508 | 91.31% | 11,372 | 8.69% | 130,880 | 100.00% | Republican hold |
| District 29 | 73,205 | 100.00% | - | - | - | - | 73,205 | 100.00% | Democratic hold |
| District 30 | 48,110 | 29.77% | 109,167 | 67.55% | 4,321 | 2.67% | 161,598 | 100.00% | Republican hold |
| District 31 | - | - | 118,938 | 100.00% | - | - | 118,938 | 100.00% | Republican hold |
| Total | 1,567,895 | 38.37% | 2,360,682 | 57.77% | 157,565 | 3.86% | 4,086,142 | 100.00% | Source: |

== Notable races ==
=== District 2 ===
2nd senate district election
| Nominee | Bob Deuell | David Cain |
| Party | Republican | Democratic |
| Popular vote | 80,075 | 66,151 |
| Percentage | 53.94% | 44.56% |
- County results Deuell: 40–50% 50–60% 70–80% Cain: 50–60% 70–80%
Texas Senator before election
David Cain
Democratic Party
Elected Texas Senator
Bob Deuell
Republican Party

Incumbent Democratic senator David Cain sought re-election, but he lost to Republican Bob Deuell in a rematch of the 2000 election, which Cain had narrowly won.

District 2 general election
| Party | Candidate | Votes | % |
|---|---|---|---|
| Republican | Bob Deuell | 80,075 | 53.94% |
| Democratic | David Cain (incumbent) | 66,151 | 44.56% |
| Libertarian | Robert Parker | 2,217 | 1.49% |
| Total votes | | 148,443 | 100.00% |
| Republican gain from Democratic | | | |

=== District 18 ===
18th senate district election
| Nominee | Ken Armbrister | Lester Phillips |
| Party | Democratic | Republican |
| Popular vote | 85,401 | 72,296 |
| Percentage | 53.31% | 45.13% |
- County results Armbrister: 50–60% 60–70% 70–80% Phillips: 50–60% 60–70%
Texas Senator before election
Ken Armbrister
Democratic Party
Elected Texas Senator
Ken Armbrister
Democratic Party

Incumbent Democratic senator Ken Armbrister ran for re-election. District 18, centered around Victoria, voted strongly for President George W. Bush during his gubernatorial elections and in the 2000 presidential election. Armbrister was considered the most conservative Democrat in the Senate and had endorsed and openly campaigned for Bush during his presidential run, although he did not consider switching parties. He won re-election.

District 18 general election
| Party | Candidate | Votes | % |
|---|---|---|---|
| Democratic | Ken Armbrister (incumbent) | 85,401 | 53.31% |
| Republican | Lester Phillips | 72,296 | 45.13% |
| Libertarian | Horace Henley | 2,508 | 1.57% |
| Total votes | | 160,205 | 100.00% |
| Democratic hold | | | |
