= Kent Hance =

American politician (born 1942)

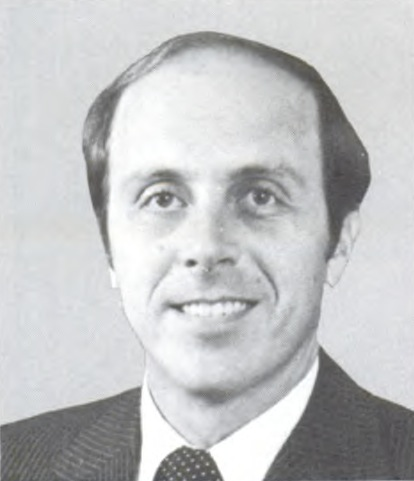
- Official portrait, 1979

Chancellor of the Texas Tech University System
- In office December 1, 2006 – June 30, 2014
- Preceded by: David Smith
- Succeeded by: Robert L. Duncan

Railroad Commissioner of Texas
- In office September 23, 1987 – January 2, 1991
- Governor: Bill Clements
- Preceded by: Mark Wallace
- Succeeded by: Bob Krueger

Member of the U.S. House of Representatives from Texas's 19th district
- In office January 3, 1979 – January 3, 1985
- Preceded by: George H. Mahon
- Succeeded by: Larry Combest

Member of the Texas Senate from the 28th district
- In office January 14, 1975 – January 9, 1979
- Preceded by: Doc Blanchard
- Succeeded by: E. L. Short

Personal details
- Born: Kent Ronald Hance; November 14, 1942 (age 83) Dimmitt, Texas, U.S.
- Party: Democratic (before 1985); Republican (1985–present)
- Education: Texas Tech University (BBA); University of Texas, Austin (LLB)

Kent Ronald Hance (born November 14, 1942) is an American politician and lawyer who is the former Chancellor of the Texas Tech University System. In his role, he oversaw Texas Tech University, Texas Tech University Health Sciences Center and Angelo State University in San Angelo, Texas. He is also a lobbyist and lawyer. Hance is the only person to defeat George W. Bush in an election. (which he did in the 1978 U.S. House of Representatives election for Texas's 19th District) and became a Democratic member of the United States House of Representatives from West Texas, having served from 1979 to 1985. After his congressional service, he switched to the Republican Party and in both 1986 and 1990 ran for governor of Texas, losing in the primary election.

== Early years and election to Congress ==
Hance obtained his Bachelor of Business Administration degree in finance from the Rawls College of Business at Texas Tech University in 1965 where he was also a member of Delta Tau Delta, which he served as president. He also served as the Student Government Association Vice-president and was a member of the Saddle Tramps.

He later attended the University of Texas School of Law. During his time as a law student, he was the Student Bar Association President and chosen as recipient of the Counsel Award. After law school, he was admitted to the Texas bar and in 1968 became a practicing attorney in Lubbock, Texas. During this period, he was also a law professor at Texas Tech from 1968 until 1973.

In 1974, Hance ran for the Texas Senate and defeated incumbent H.J. "Doc" Blanchard in the 1974 primary. His campaign at the beginning seemed doomed to failure, but Hance quickly made connection with voters in the sprawling West Texas district.

=== 1978 election vs. George W. Bush ===
He served in the state senate from 1975 to 1979. After winning the 1978 Democratic primary nomination for the Lubbock-based 19th congressional district, he defeated the Republican nominee George W. Bush of Midland. The seat, which was based in Lubbock, had been held since its inception by popular Democrat George H. Mahon, long-time chairman of the House Appropriations Committee (the 19th included most of the Permian Basin at the time). Bush won the Republican nomination in a hard-fought but low-turnout runoff primary against the 1976 party nominee, Jim Reese of Odessa.

The 19th had long been one of the more conservative areas of Texas. It was one of the first areas of Texas to move away from its Democratic roots; it hadn't supported a Democrat for president since 1964. However, at the time, conservative Democrats continued to represent much of the region at the state and local levels, and would do so well into the 1990s. Hance claimed Bush was "not a real Texan" because of his privileged upbringing and Yale education. Hance won by seven points—the only time that the future 43rd president of the United States was ever defeated in an election.

=== Tenure in Congress ===
As a Democratic member of Congress during 1979–1985, Hance was a member of the "boll-weevil" conservative Democrats. As such, he became one of President Ronald Reagan's allies and carried his tax-cut, the nation's largest tax cut, in 1981.

Hance was reelected two times. His voting record was very conservative even by Texas Democrat standards; he compiled a lifetime rating of 72 from the American Conservative Union.

=== 1984 Senate bid ===
He did not run for a fourth term in 1984, opting instead to seek the Democratic nomination for the Senate seat being vacated by the retiring John Tower. Hance announced within hours of Tower's withdrawal that he would run for the Senate. No candidate received a majority vote in the primary, so Hance, along with State Senator Lloyd Doggett of Austin, advanced to a run-off. He was defeated by only 1,345 votes by Doggett, who lost the general election for Senate but later served many years in the House. Geography worked against Hance in the primary; no one from west of San Antonio has ever represented Texas in the Senate.

Hance endorsed one of his aides, Don R. Richards, in the Democratic primary for his congressional seat. Richards won the nomination, but was defeated in the general election by a young Republican, Larry Combest, a former aide to Tower. Proving just how Republican this district had become at the national level, Richards only tallied 41.9 percent of the vote—one of only two times since Hance left office that a Democrat has cleared 40 percent of the vote.

Hance donated money to his former opponent George W. Bush's campaign for Governor of Texas in 1994.

== Kent R. Hance Chapel ==
On May 1, 2011, Texas Tech University announced that Kent Hance provided the largest gift, $1.75 million, toward the $3 million privately funded non-denominational campus chapel, named the Kent R. Hance Chapel designed by McKinney York Architects.

== Awards ==
In 1985, Hance received the Texas Tech Alumni Association Distinguished Alumni Award. In 2009, Hance received the South Plains Council Boy Scouts of America John F. Lott Distinguished Citizen Award. In 2009–2010, Hance received the Outstanding Texas State Leader Award at the Annual Texas Leadership Forum, presented by the John Ben Shepperd Public Leadership Institute. Additionally, Hance received the Hope Award from the National Multiple Sclerosis Society West Texas Chapter in April 2010.

== Footnotes ==
U.S. House of Representatives
Preceded by George H. Mahon	Member of the U.S. House of Representatives from Texas's 19th congressional district 1979–1985	Succeeded by Larry Combest
Political offices
Preceded by Mark Wallace	Member of the Texas Railroad Commission; 1987–1991	Succeeded by Bob Krueger
Academic offices
Preceded by David Smith	Chancellor of Texas Tech University System; 2006–2014	Succeeded by Robert L. Duncan
U.S. order of precedence (ceremonial)
Preceded by Mike Waltz as Former U.S. Representative	Order of precedence of the United States as Former U.S. Representative	Succeeded by Bill Sarpalius as Former U.S. Representative
