= Texas Senate Bill 3 =

Texas Legislature
- Long title: AN ACT relating to the regulation of products derived from hemp, including consumable hemp products and the hemp-derived cannabinoids contained in those products; requiring occupational licenses and permits; imposing fees; creating criminal offenses; authorizing an administrative penalty.
- Vetoed by: Greg Abbott
- Vetoed: June 22, 2025
- Introduced by: Charles Perry
- Status: Vetoed

Texas Senate Bill 3 was a 2025 bill of the Texas Legislature vetoed by Governor Greg Abbott on June 22, 2025.

== Background ==
Hemp was legalized at the federal level by the Agriculture Improvement Act of 2018 and at the state level in Texas by House Bill 1325 in 2019.

== Legislative history ==
=== Passage ===
The bill passed the Texas House of Representatives on May 22, 2025.

The bill was vetoed by Governor Greg Abbott on June 22, 2025.

=== Senate Bill 5 ===
In July 2025, Perry reintroduced the legislation as Texas Senate Bill 5. It passed the upper chamber of the Senate on August 1, 2025.
