= 2000 Texas Senate election =

- November 7, 2000

15 of the 31 seats in the Texas Senate 16 seats needed for a majority
	Majority party	Minority party
Party	Republican	Democratic
Seats before	16	15
Seats won	16	15
Seat change	Steady	Steady
Popular vote	1,661,939	810,279
Percentage	65.08%	31.73%
Swing	▲6.91%	▼10.10%
- Senate results by district Republican hold Democratic hold No election
President Pro Tempore before election
Republican
Elected President Pro Tempore
Republican

The 2000 Texas Senate elections took place as part of the biennial United States elections. Texas voters elected state senators in 15 State Senate districts. All of the seats up for this election were for two-year terms, with senators up for re-election in the 2002 elections. State senators typically serve four-year terms in the Texas State Senate, but all Senators come up for election in the cycles following each decennial redistricting. The winners of this election served in the 77th Texas Legislature.

== Background ==
The Republican Party had held the State Senate since the 1996 elections.

== Results ==
Despite the highly contentious 2000 presidential election taking place at the same time, in which Republican governor George W. Bush won nearly 60% of the vote in Texas, Republicans failed to expand their narrow majority in the Texas Senate. Only one seat saw a new member elected, a seat Republicans held after one member retired. Republicans had heavily targeted Democrat David Cain, who represented an increasingly Republican-leaning district in and east of Dallas, but he won re-election by a larger than expected margin, maintaining the chamber's composition.

=== Results by district ===
District	Democratic		Republican		Libertarian		Total		Result
District	Votes	%	Votes	%	Votes	%	Votes	%	Result
District 2	100,181	53.18%	88,212	46.82%	-	-	188,393	100.00%	Democratic hold
District 3	98,976	39.36%	152,514	60.64%	-	-	251,490	100.00%	Democratic hold
District 7	-	-	219,835	100.00%	-	-	219,835	100.00%	Republican hold
District 8	-	-	225,369	100.00%	-	-	225,369	100.00%	Republican hold
District 9	-	-	207,079	100.00%	-	-	207,079	100.00%	Republican hold
District 10	-	-	187,302	100.00%	-	-	187,302	100.00%	Republican hold
District 12	187,302	75.18%	61,846	24.82%	-	-	24,9148	100.00%	Democratic hold
District 14	185,478	81.95%	-	-	40,847	18.05%	226,325	100.00%	Democratic hold
District 15	95,826	65.06%	51,465	34.94%	-	-	147,291	100.00%	Democratic hold
District 21	106,089	66.46%	53,547	33.54%	-	-	159,636	100.00%	Democratic hold
District 24	-	-	130,913	100.00%	-	-	130,913	100.00%	Republican hold
District 25	-	-	283,857	87.43%	40,806	12.57%	324,663	100.00%	Republican hold
District 26	105,771	100.00%	-	-	-	-	105,771	100.00%	Democratic hold
District 27	94,042	100.00%	-	-	-	-	94,042	100.00%	Democratic hold
District 29	101,045	100.00%	-	-	-	-	101,045	100.00%	Republican hold
Total	810,279	31.73%	1,661,939	65.08%	81,653	3.19%	2,553,871	100.00%	Source:
