= Tedd L. Mitchell =

American physician and academic administrator

Tedd Mitchell
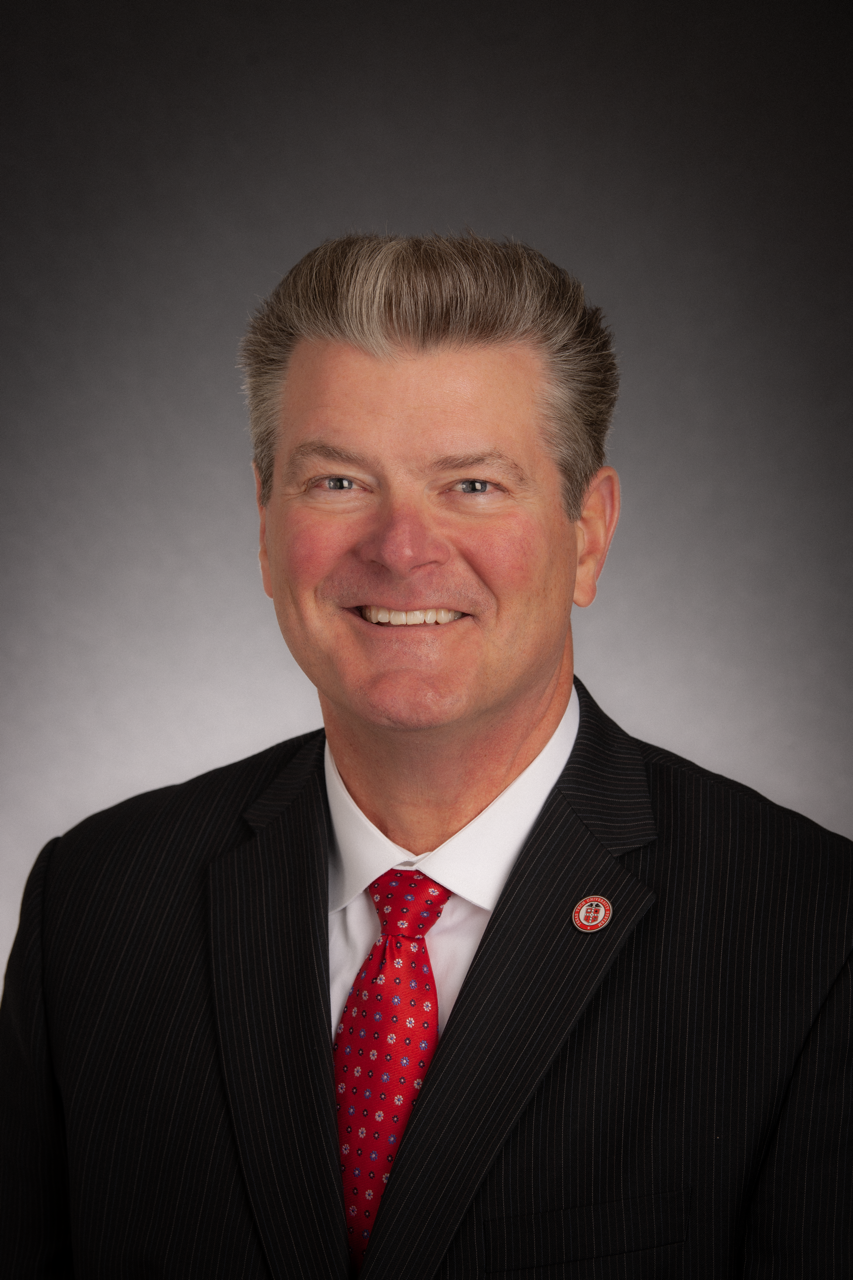

5th Chancellor of the Texas Tech University System
- In office September 1, 2018 – November 19, 2025
- Preceded by: Robert L. Duncan
- Succeeded by: Brandon Creighton

8th President of the Texas Tech University Health Sciences Center
- In office May 17, 2010 – October 30, 2019
- Preceded by: John C. Baldwin
- Succeeded by: Lori Rice-Spearman

Personal details
- Born: February 24, 1962 (age 64) Columbia, Louisiana, U.S.
- Education: Stephen F. Austin State University (BS); University of Texas, Galveston (MD)

Military service
- Branch/service: United States Army
- Years of service: 1988–1996
- Rank: Captain
- Unit: United States Army Medical Corps; United States Army Reserve • Army Reserve Medical Command

Tedd L. Mitchell (born February 24, 1962) is an American physician, academic, and author. He served as the fifth chancellor of the Texas Tech University System (2018-2025), the eighth president of the Texas Tech University Health Sciences Center (2010-2019), the chairman of the Board of Trustees of the Cooper Institute (2010-2024), a Dallas-based health and wellness system founded by Kenneth H. Cooper, and the president of the Cooper Clinic (2006-2010).

== Early life and education ==
Mitchell was born in Columbia, Louisiana and raised in Longview, Texas. While at Longview High School, he swam competitively and held the school's 100-yard butterfly record for more than four decades (1980-2021). After high school graduation in 1980, he earned a Bachelor of Science degree in biology from Stephen F. Austin State University and a Doctor of Medicine degree in 1987 from the University of Texas Medical Branch, where he is an Ashbel Smith Distinguished Alumnus.

He trained in Internal Medicine at the University of Texas Medical Branch (John Sealy Hospital System) and served an additional year as the Chief Medical Resident.

== Military ==
Mitchell served as a captain of the U.S. Army Reserves Medical Corps from 1988 to 1996.

== Career ==
=== Career with the Cooper Clinic ===
In 1991, he joined the Cooper Clinic in Dallas, eventually earning a certificate of added qualification in Sports Medicine. He held the position of Medical Director of the Cooper Wellness Program until being named president and chief executive officer in 2006.

In 2002, he was appointed by President George W. Bush to serve on the President's Council on Physical Fitness and Sports. In 2007, he was named to the American College of Sports Medicine Board of Trustees. He also served on Texas Governor George Bush’s State Board on Aging (1998 – 2002).

He is a Fellow of the American College of Physicians and the American College of Sports Medicine.

During his time at the Cooper Clinic, Mitchell served as the Health and Wellness Editor for USA Weekend, writing over 600 articles from 1998 to 2010. He also co-authored three books: Fit to Lead, Move Yourself, and Fit to Lead 2 (one of the co-authors was his wife, Dr. Janet Tornelli-Mitchell).

=== Career with the Texas Tech University System ===
In 2010, Mitchell began his career in academic administration joining the Texas Tech University System as president of Texas Tech University Health Sciences Center. During his tenure, Texas Tech University Health Sciences Center El Paso was established as a standalone institution in 2013, becoming the Texas Tech University System's fourth university. During his presidency, the Texas Tech University Health Sciences Center University Center in Lubbock was expanded, along with facilities expansions in Odessa, Amarillo, Abilene, and Dallas.

On October 25, 2018, the Texas Tech University System Board of Regents named Mitchell the fifth chancellor of the TTU System. Following the appointment, he served in the dual role of TTU System chancellor and TTUHSC president for approximately one year, until Nov. 1, 2019, when Lori Rice-Spearman, TTUHSC provost and chief academic officer, was named interim TTUHSC president.

During his tenure as chancellor, Midwestern State University joined the TTU System, becoming its fifth member institution on September 1, 2021.

In 2019, a delegation led by Mitchell urged the 86th Texas Legislature to approve and fund a new Texas Tech University veterinary school in Amarillo, Texas's first new veterinary school since 1916. The veterinary school, intended to address shortages in rural and regional veterinary services, admitted its first class in August 2021. The initial cohort graduated in May 2025, with 97 percent passing the North American Veterinary Licensing Examination and a majority entering veterinary practice in underserved communities. In July 2021, the Woody L. Hunt School of Dental Medicine at Texas Tech University Health Sciences Center El Paso opened as Texas’s first new dental school in over 50 years and the only dental school on the U.S.–Mexico border. Its first class graduated in May 2025.

In 2023, Mitchell campaigned for the 88th Texas Legislature to create the Texas University Fund (TUF), an endowment designed to provide additional annual research funding to universities not eligible for money from the Permanent University Fund (PUF) endowment. This legislation was passed and signed by Governor Greg Abbott in June 2023. The fund also required an amendment to the Texas Constitution, which Texas voters approved in November of that year.

In 2025, Mitchell worked with members of the 89th Texas Legislature on the budget of the Texas Tech University System, which at approximately $3.7 billion was the largest in its history.

During his tenure as chancellor, the Texas Tech University System had record enrollment and received over $1.5 billion in support from donors.

=== Leadership ===
Mitchell led efforts to identify a shared set of core values intended to guide decision-making, professional conduct, and organizational accountability, which the Texas Tech University System adopted.

Under Mitchell, an Office of Leader & Culture Development was set up, first at Texas Tech University Health Sciences Center and later at the TTU System Administration and other system universities. The offices provide leadership training for faculty, staff, administrators, and students. The Texas Tech University System also introduced leadership and professional development programs for employees and students, covering problem-solving, critical thinking, ethical leadership, and character building.

== Personal life ==
Mitchell is married to Dr. Janet Tornelli-Mitchell, also a physician and partner with him while in practice at the Cooper Clinic. The couple met while in medical school. Dr. Tornelli-Mitchell served on the Texas Medical Board under Governors George W. Bush and Rick Perry. The Mitchells have three children and five grandchildren.

Mitchell holds a 5th-degree black belt in Taekwondo.

== Honors, affiliations, and awards ==
- Finalist, Texan of the Year; Dallas Morning News, 2022.
- The Honor Society of Phi Kappa Phi, member, 2017.
- Business Person of the Year, Lubbock Chamber of Commerce, 2015.
- The University of Texas Medical Branch, Ashbel Smith Distinguished Alumnus Award, 2014.
- American Medical Writers Association, Walter C. Alvarez Award for Excellence in Medical Communication, 2008.
- Clarion Award, National Informational Column (HealthSmart), USA Weekend, 2006.

== Selected publications ==
- Mitchell, Tedd; Barlow, Carolyn E. (July 2011). "Review of the Role of Exercise in Improving Quality of Life in Healthy Individuals and in Those With Chronic Diseases". Current Sports Medicine Reports. 10 (4): 211–216. doi:10.1249/JSR.0b013e318223cc9e. PMID 23531896.
- Mitchell, Tedd L.; Gibbons, Larry W.; Devers, Susan M.; Earnest, Conrad P. (December 2004). "Effects of Cardiorespiratory Fitness on Healthcare Utilization". Medicine & Science in Sports & Exercise. 36 (12): 2088–2092. doi:10.1249/01.mss.0000147581.47326.58. PMID 15570144.
- Mitchell, Tedd L.; Pippin, John J.; Devers, Susan M.; Kimball, Thomas E.; Cannaday, John J.; Gibbons, Larry W.; Cooper, Kenneth H. (February 2001). "Age- and sex-based nomograms from coronary artery calcium scores as determined by electron beam computed tomography". The American Journal of Cardiology. 87 (4): 453–456. doi:10.1016/s0002-9149(00)01403-x. PMID 11179534.
- Gibbons, Larry W; Mitchell, Tedd L; Wei, Ming; Blair, Steven N; Cooper, Kenneth H (July 2000). "Maximal exercise test as a predictor of risk for mortality from coronary heart disease in asymptomatic men". The American Journal of Cardiology. 86 (1): 53–58. doi:10.1016/S0002-9149(00)00827-4. PMID 10867092.
- Neck, Christopher P.; Mitchell, T.L.; Manz, Charles C.; Cooper, Kenneth H.; Thompson, Emmet C. (December 2000). "Observations – Fit to lead: is fitness the key to effective executive leadership?". Journal of Managerial Psychology. 15 (8): 833–841. doi:10.1108/02683940010694323.
- Wei, Ming; Gibbons, Larry W.; Mitchell, Tedd L.; Kampert, James B.; Stern, Michael P.; Blair, Steven N. (May 2, 2000). "Low Fasting Plasma Glucose Level as a Predictor of Cardiovascular Disease and All-Cause Mortality". Circulation. 101 (17): 2047–2052. doi:10.1161/01.cir.101.17.2047. PMID 10790345.
