= Charles Perry (Texas politician) =

American politician and accountant

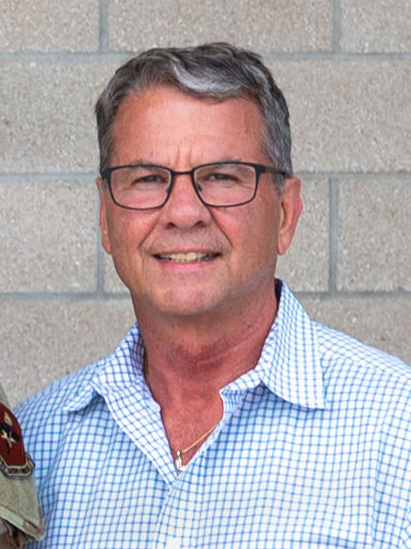
- Perry in 2026

President pro tempore of the Texas Senate
- Incumbent
- Assumed office June 2, 2025
- Preceded by: Brandon Creighton

Member of the Texas Senate from the 28th district
- Incumbent
- Assumed office September 30, 2014
- Preceded by: Robert L. Duncan

Member of the Texas House of Representatives from the 83rd district
- In office January 11, 2011 – September 30, 2014
- Preceded by: Delwin Jones
- Succeeded by: Dustin Burrows

Personal details
- Born: March 9, 1962 (age 64) Abilene, Texas, U.S.
- Party: Republican
- Spouse: Jacklyn
- Children: 2
- Education: Texas Tech University (BBA)
- Website: Office website Campaign website

Charles Perry is an accountant and politician serving as a member of the Texas Senate from the 28th district. He assumed office on September 30, 2014. He was previously a member of the Texas House of Representatives for the 83rd district from 2010 to 2014.

== Early life and education ==
Perry is a native of Lubbock, Texas. After graduating from Sweetwater High School in Sweetwater, Texas, Perry earned a Bachelor of Business Administration degree in accounting and management information systems from Texas Tech University. Perry has worked as a Certified Public Accountant.

== Political career ==
Perry was first elected to the Texas House of Representatives in 2010, defeating Delwin Jones who held the position since 1989. He was a member of the Texas House for the 83rd district from 2010 to 2014.

Perry was elected to the Texas Senate in 2014, winning a special election for the seat vacated by Robert L. Duncan. In 2025, Perry authored legislation to ban THC in Texas.

Texas Senate
Preceded by Brandon Creighton	President pro tempore of the Texas Senate; 2025–present	Incumbent
