= John C. Baldwin =

American cardiac surgeon and academic administrator(1948–2016)

7th President of the Texas Tech University Health Sciences Center
- Succeeded by: Tedd L. Mitchell

Personal details
- Born: September 23, 1948
- Died: April 3, 2016 (aged 67) San Diego, California
- Education: Harvard University; Stanford University (MD)

John Charles Baldwin (September 23, 1948 – April 3, 2016) was an American cardiac surgeon and academic administrator. He served as the surgery department chairman at Baylor College of Medicine, as dean of Dartmouth College's Geisel School of Medicine, as president and CEO of the Harvard Immune Disease Institute, and as president of the Texas Tech University Health Sciences Center.

== Biography ==
Baldwin earned an undergraduate degree in anthropology at Harvard University, was a Rhodes Scholar at Magdalen College, Oxford, and attended Stanford University School of Medicine. He completed a cardiothoracic surgery residency at Stanford in 1983. At Stanford, he trained under cardiac surgeon Norman Shumway. After he completed his training, Baldwin taught and practiced cardiothoracic surgery as a faculty member at Stanford, becoming the director of the heart-lung transplantation program there. In 1988, he accepted the same position at the Yale School of Medicine.

Baldwin was named the Debakey Professor and the surgery department chairman at Baylor College of Medicine in 1994. While at Baylor, he performed the first successful cardiac "auto-transplant" procedure, in which he removed a patient's heart, took a tumor out of the heart, and reimplanted the heart into the patient. He conducted research on gene therapy and growth factor utilization in cardiac care, and he worked to enhance the care provided in academic managed care systems. He became the medical school dean and associate provost for health affairs at Dartmouth College in 1998.

Baldwin was president and CEO of the Harvard Immune Disease Institute from 2005 to 2007. He became president of the Texas Tech University Health Sciences Center (TTUHSC) in 2007. During Baldwin's presidency, the Paul L. Foster School of Medicine at the TTUHSC El Paso campus received its accreditation as a four-year medical school. He resigned as president in 2009, but he remained at Texas Tech as an advisor to the chancellor and as a tenured professor.

In 1995, Baldwin was elected to a six-year term on the Harvard University Board of Overseers. He also served on the board of directors of the Robert F. Kennedy Foundation and he received a 2011 presidential appointment to the U.S. Defense Health Board.

Baldwin died on April 3, 2016, following a swimming accident in San Diego, California.
