= 1990 Texas Senate election =

- November 6, 1990

16 of the 31 seats in the Texas Senate 16 seats needed for a majority
	Majority party	Minority party
Party	Democratic	Republican
Last election	23	8
Seats won	23	8
Seat change	Steady	Steady
- Senate results by district Democratic hold Republican hold No election
President Pro Tempore before election
Democratic
Elected President Pro Tempore
Democratic

The 1990 Texas Senate elections took place as part of the biennial United States elections. Texas voters elected state senators in 16 of the 31 State Senate. The winners of this election served in the 72rd Texas Legislature.

== Background ==
Democrats had controlled the Texas Senate since the 1872 elections.

== Results ==
No seats changed hands in the 1990 elections, with Democrats maintaining their supermajority in the chamber.

=== Results by district ===
District	Democratic		Republican		Others		Total		Result
District	Votes	%	Votes	%	Votes	%	Votes	%	Result
District 5	73,231	50.00%	64,542	44.06%	8,703	5.94%	146,476	100.00%	Democratic hold
District 6	50,092	69.21%	22,285	30.79%	-	-	72,377	100.00%	Democratic hold
District 7	-	-	-	100.00%	-	-	-	100.00%	Republican hold
District 10	-	-	-	100.00%	-	-	-	100.00%	Republican hold
District 11	56,399	55.23%	45,721	44.77%	-	-	102,120	100.00%	Democratic hold
District 12	73,759	63.41%	39,259	33.75%	3,297	2.83%	116,315	100.00%	Democratic hold
District 13	68,398	75.30%	22,418	24.68%	21	0.02%	90,837	100.00%	Democratic hold
District 15	-	100.00%	-	-	-	-	-	100.00%	Democratic hold
District 16	49,968	40.19%	74,356	59.81%	-	-	124,324	100.00%	Republican hold
District 18	-	100.00%	-	-	-	-	-	100.00%	Democratic hold
District 19	-	100.00%	-	-	-	-	-	100.00%	Democratic hold
District 21	81,363	68.29%	37,781	31.71%	-	-	119,144	100.00%	Democratic hold
District 23	-	100.00%	-	-	-	-	-	100.00%	Democratic hold
District 25	-	100.00%	-	-	-	-	-	100.00%	Democratic hold
District 27	-	100.00%	-	-	-	-	-	100.00%	Democratic hold
District 29	51,487	68.28%	23,920	31.72%	-	-	75,407	100.00%	Democratic hold
Total	–	–	–	–	–	–	–	100.00%	Source:
