= Robert L. Duncan =

American politician (born 1953)

Robert Lloyd Duncan

4th Chancellor of the Texas Tech University System
- In office July 7, 2014 – August 31, 2018
- Preceded by: Kent Hance
- Succeeded by: Tedd L. Mitchell

Member of the Texas Senate from the 28th district
- In office January 1997 – July 6, 2014
- Preceded by: John T. Montford
- Succeeded by: Charles Perry

Member of the Texas House of Representatives from the 84th district
- In office January 1989 – January 1993
- Preceded by: Warren Chisum
- Succeeded by: Carl Isett

Personal details
- Born: August 5, 1953 (age 73) Vernon, Texas, U.S.
- Party: Republican
- Children: 2
- Education: Texas Tech University (BA, JD)

Robert Lloyd Duncan (born August 5, 1953) is an American attorney and politician who served as the fourth chancellor of the Texas Tech University System from 2014 to 2018. A Republican, he previously served as a member of both houses of the Texas State Legislature.

== Early life and education ==
Duncan is the only son of the five children of Frank L. Duncan, a district conservationist for the U.S. Department of Agriculture in Vernon, and the former Robena Formby. Duncan graduated from Vernon High School in 1971, and obtained a bachelor degree in agricultural economics from Texas Tech University, where he was elected student senator and student body president. He also obtained a Juris Doctor degree from Texas Tech law school.

== Career ==
Duncan served in the Texas State Senate from the 28th district, centered about Lubbock, from 1996, when he won a special election, until his resignation in July 2014, when he was named chancellor of the Texas Tech system. He previously served in the Texas House of Representatives from District 84 from his election in 1992 until 1996. On May 19, 2014, the Texas Tech University System Board of Regents named Duncan the sole finalist to succeed former U.S. Representative Kent Hance as the system chancellor. He resigned his role as chancellor in 2018.

Duncan was a partner at the Lubbock firm of Crenshaw Dupree & Milam, L.L.P. for 25 years, and is now of counsel for the firm. In January 2025, the office of Texas House Speaker Dustin Burrows announced that Duncan would be joining his team to serve as Chief of Staff.

== Personal life ==
Duncan is married to the former Terri Patterson. He has two children from his first marriage to the former Lynne Stebbins, Lindsey and Matthew Duncan.

== Election history ==
Senate election history of Duncan.

=== Most recent election ===
==== 2004 ====
Texas general election, 2004: Senate District 28
Party	Candidate	Votes	%	±%
Republican	Robert Duncan (Incumbent)	176,588	100.00	+8.68
Majority		176,588	100.00	+17.37
Turnout		176,588		+34.85
Republican hold				

=== Previous elections ===
==== 2002 ====
Texas general election, 2002: Senate District 28
Party	Candidate	Votes	%	±%
Republican	Robert Duncan (Incumbent)	119,580	91.32	−8.68
Libertarian	Jon Ensor	11,372	8.8	+8.68
Majority		108,208	82.63	−17.37
Turnout		130,952		+58.98
Republican hold				

==== 1998 ====
Texas general election, 1998: Senate District 28
Party	Candidate	Votes	%	±%
Republican	Robert Duncan (Incumbent)	82,368	100.00	+64.21
Majority		82,368	100.00	+71.58
Turnout		82,368		−32.78
Republican hold				

==== 1996 ====
Special Election Runoff: Senate District 28, Unexpired term December 10, 1996
Party	Candidate	Votes	%	±%
Republican	Robert Duncan	32,489	56.82	'"`UNIQ−−ref−00000056−QINU`"'+26.42
Democratic	David R. Langston	24,686	43.18	+18.89
Majority		7,803	13.65	
Turnout		57,175		
Republican gain from Democratic				

Special Election: Senate District 28, Unexpired term November 2, 1996
Party	Candidate	Votes	%	±%
Republican	Dick Bowen	3,938	2.65	
Republican	Robert Duncan	45,106	30.41	
Republican	Monte Hasie of Lubbock	13,303	8.97	
Republican	Tim Lambert of Lubbock	18,885	12.73	
Democratic	David R. Langston of Lubbock	36,032	24.29	
Democratic	Lorenzo "Bubba" Sedeno	12,419	8.37	
Democratic	Gary L. Watkins of Odessa	18,652	12.57	
Turnout		148,335		

Academic offices
Preceded by Kent Hance	Chancellor of Texas Tech University System; 2014	Incumbent
Texas House of Representatives
Preceded by Warren Chisum	Member of the Texas House of Representatives from District 84 (Lubbock); 1988–1993	Succeeded by Carl Isett
Texas Senate
Preceded by John T. Montford	Texas State Senator from District 28 (Lubbock); 1996-2014	Succeeded by Charles Perry
