= 1994 Texas Senate election =

- November 8, 1994

All 31 seats in the Texas Senate 16 seats needed for a majority
	Majority party	Minority party
Party	Democratic	Republican
Last election	18	13
Seats won	17	14
Seat change	▼1	▲1
Popular vote	1,757,113	1,924,437
Percentage	46.95%	51.42%
Swing	▼4.55%	▲6.07%
- Senate results by district Democratic hold Democratic gain Republican hold Republican gain
President Pro Tempore before election
Democratic
Elected President Pro Tempore
Democratic

The 1994 Texas Senate elections took place as part of the biennial United States elections. Texas voters elected state senators in all 31 State Senate districts due to redistricting. Half of the seats were elected for two-year terms and the other half were elected for four-year terms. The winners of this election served in the 74th Texas Legislature. This was the last election in which Democrats won a majority in the Senate.

== Background ==
Democrats had controlled the Texas Senate since the 1872 elections. The 1992 elections had been held under lines drawn by federal courts, which had overturned the maps passed by the legislature as unconstitutional partisan gerrymanders. Democrats had tried to pass their own maps for the courts to allow in a January 1992 special session, but the courts rejected these maps and imposed their own. Democrats took issue with the presence of Judge James Robertson Nowlin on the panel. Nowlin was a former Republican state representative who had taken part in the controversial 1981 redistricting. Nowlin would later admit to being in contact with multiple Republican House members concerning the districts the courts were drawing. Democrats sought Nowlin's recusal from the case because of this, but the plans had already been enacted by the time this had occurred.

The court-imposed maps were seen as highly favorable to Republicans, and they believed they had the opportunity to win the chamber for the first time since Reconstruction under them. Republicans made substantial gains in the 1992 elections, gaining four seats from the Democrats, but they failed to win control. With Judge Nowlin no longer on the federal panel, the 1994 elections were allowed to be held under the lines passed by the legislature in the January 1992 special session. Despite the more favorable maps, the political damage had already been done to the Democrats, as many of the incumbents their map was designed to protect had already lost re-election in 1992. Because the 1994 map was completely different from the 1992 map, all senators were required to run for re-election, instead of only half of them.

== Results ==
Republicans made mild gains, winning 14 seats to the Democrats' 17, but they failed to take control of the chamber, even amidst the Republican Revolution which saw the election of George W. Bush to the governorship and Republicans winning majorities on the Supreme Court, Board of Education, and Railroad Commission.

=== Results by district ===
District	Democratic		Republican		Others		Total		Result
District	Votes	%	Votes	%	Votes	%	Votes	%	Result
District 1	55,616	35.46%	101,207	64.54%	-	-	156,823	100.00%	Republican hold
District 2	61,757	50.59%	60,317	49.41%	-	-	122,074	100.00%	Democratic gain
District 3	76,245	47.65%	83,779	52.35%	-	-	160,024	100.00%	Republican gain
District 4	71,012	47.26%	79,252	52.74%	-	-	150,264	100.00%	Republican gain
District 5	82,541	55.99%	64,875	44.01%	-	-	147,416	100.00%	Democratic hold
District 6	38,759	100.00%	-	-	-	-	38,759	100.00%	Democratic gain
District 7	-	-	143,628	100.00%	-	-	143,628	100.00%	Republican hold
District 8	-	-	156,014	90.23%	16,889	9.77%	172,903	100.00%	Republican hold
District 9	-	-	127,623	100.00%	-	-	127,623	100.00%	Republican hold
District 10	-	-	129,343	100.00%	-	-	129,343	100.00%	Republican hold
District 11	59,047	44.39%	73,959	55.61%	-	-	133,006	100.00%	Republican hold
District 12	94,707	100.00%	-	-	-	-	94,707	100.00%	Democratic hold
District 13	89,832	100.00%	-	-	-	-	89,832	100.00%	Democratic hold
District 14	135,979	83.02%	-	-	27,820	16.98%	163,799	100.00%	Democratic hold
District 15	66,341	100.00%	-	-	-	-	66,341	100.00%	Democratic hold
District 16	-	-	108,229	64.07%	16,026	12.90%	124,255	100.00%	Republican hold
District 17	44,465	27.42%	117,727	72.58%	-	-	162,192	100.00%	Republican hold
District 18	98,066	100.00%	-	-	-	-	98,066	100.00%	Democratic hold
District 19	60,422	100.00%	-	-	-	-	60,422	100.00%	Democratic hold
District 20	67,066	58.44%	47,686	41.56%	-	-	114,752	100.00%	Democratic hold
District 21	71,029	68.53%	32,624	31.47%	-	-	103,653	100.00%	Democratic hold
District 22	58,544	41.34%	83,064	58.66%	-	-	141,608	100.00%	Republican hold
District 23	79,157	100.00%	-	-	-	-	79,157	100.00%	Democratic hold
District 24	67,536	53.35%	59,048	46.65%	-	-	126,584	100.00%	Democratic hold
District 25	53,152	24.97%	159,729	75.03%	-	-	212,881	100.00%	Republican hold
District 26	55,799	63.28%	32,375	36.72%	-	-	88,174	100.00%	Democratic hold
District 27	53,194	66.73%	26,527	33.27%	-	-	79,721	100.00%	Democratic hold
District 28	78,676	64.21%	43,854	35.79%	-	-	122,530	100.00%	Democratic hold
District 29	64,207	100.00%	-	-	-	-	64,207	100.00%	Democratic hold
District 30	73,964	48.79%	77,626	51.21%	-	-	151,590	100.00%	Republican gain
District 31	-	-	115,951	100.00%	-	-	115,951	100.00%	Republican hold
Total	1,757,113	46.95%	1,924,437	51.42%	60,735	1.62%	3,742,285	100.00%	Source:
