= Texas Tech University System =

Public university system in Lubbock, Texas, U.S.

- Type: Public university system
- Established: 1996; 30 years ago
- Endowment: $3.35 billion (FY2025)
- Budget: $3.72 billion (FY2026)
- Chancellor: Brandon Creighton
- Students: 64,022 (fall 2024)
- Location: Lubbock, Texas, United States; 33.581°N 101.893°W
- Campus: 3 Universities; 2 Health Sciences Centers
- Colors: Scarlet and black
- Website: www.texastech.edu

Texas Tech University System Locations

The Texas Tech University System is a public university system in Texas with five member universities. Headquartered in Lubbock, Texas, United States, the Texas Tech University System is a $3 billion enterprise focused on advancing higher education, health care, research, and outreach with approximately 21,000 employees and 64,000 students, more than 400,000 alumni and an endowment valued at $3.35 billion. In its short history (established in 1996), the TTU System has grown tremendously with 24 academic locations statewide and internationally.

== History ==
On February 10, 1923, Texas Technological College (now named Texas Tech University) was founded, and that August, a committee selected to locate the institution in Lubbock. The Board of Directors of Texas Technological College (now named the Board of Regents of the Texas Tech University System) was established to oversee the institution.

In 1969, the Texas Tech University School of Medicine (now named Texas Tech University Health Sciences Center), was founded as a separate multi-campus institution from Texas Tech University. It was also overseen by same board of regents as Texas Tech University.

In 1985, then state senator, and future TTU System chancellor, John T. Montford proposed the creation of the Texas Tech University System.

In 1999, the Texas Legislature formally established the Texas Tech University System, consisting of the same two institutions, overseen by the board of regents, and the newly created position of chancellor to provide leadership and support for both Texas Tech University, and Texas Tech University Health Sciences Center.

In 2007, Angelo State University left the Texas State University System and joined the Texas Tech University System. On May 18, 2013, Texas Tech University Health Sciences Center at El Paso was established as a standalone institution after previously being a regional site for TTUHSC in El Paso.

On August 6, 2020, the Texas Tech University System and Midwestern State University agreed to a memorandum of understanding to begin the process of MSU Texas becoming the fifth university to join the system. The process continued on June 8, 2021, when Governor Greg Abbott signed HB 1522 into law. Midwestern State officially became a component institution when HB 1522 went into effect on September 1, 2021.

In August 2026, The New York Times reported that under the chancellorship of Brandon Creighton, the university system has featured widespread censorship of topics viewed as left-wing from college curriculum and mandated professors submit course material for ideological review.

== Component institutions ==
=== Angelo State University ===
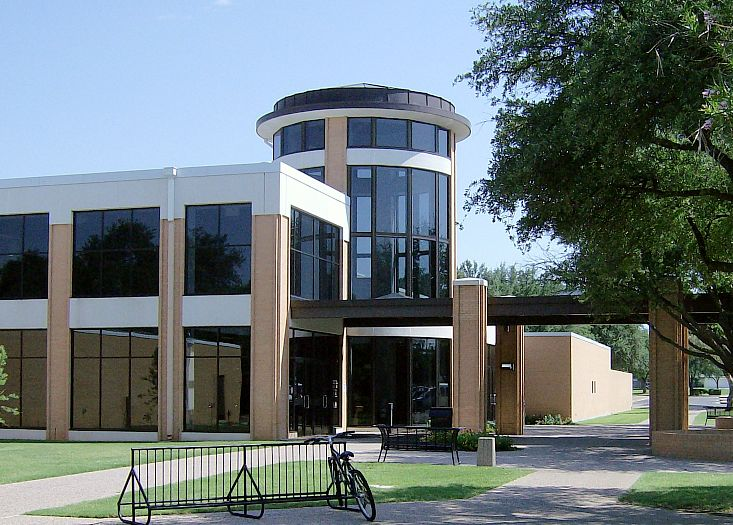
Angelo State University

Angelo State University is a public university with an enrollment of 10,826 (fall 2021) located in San Angelo, Texas. It was founded in 1928 as a two-year college. In 1965, the school began offering four-year degrees and 10 years later became part of the Texas State University System.

Angelo State University offers 48 undergraduate degrees, 28 masters and two doctoral degree programs. The university is divided into five colleges, Health and Human Services, Arts and Humanities, Education, Graduate Studies and Research, Engineering and Business. Their athletic program competes in the Lone Star Conference as a part of the NCAA Division II.

In March 2007, Rep. Drew Darby and Sen. Robert Duncan co-sponsored House Bill 3564, which aimed to realign Angelo State with the Texas Tech University System. The merger received widespread support in both Lubbock and San Angelo. The bill was approved by the full House on April 24, 2007, and by the Senate in a unanimous vote on May 15, 2007. On May 23, 2007, Gov. Rick Perry signed the bill. A companion amendment to the Texas Constitution went before voters on November 6, 2007, as Proposition 1, which passed 66.28 percent in favor to 33.72 percent against.

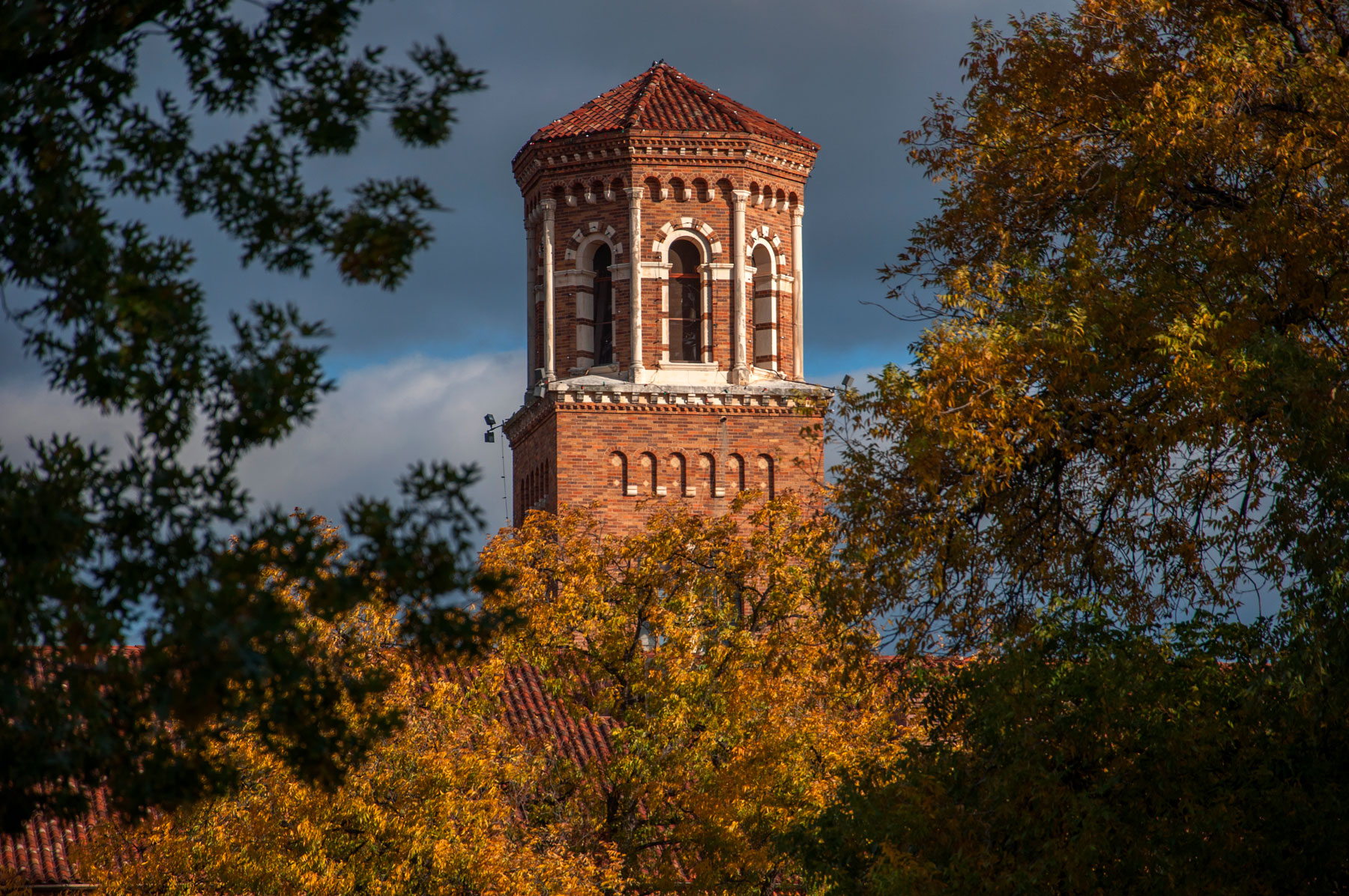
Midwestern State University

=== Midwestern State University ===
Midwestern State University is a public university in Wichita Falls, Texas with an enrollment of 5,797 (fall 2021). It is the only university in the state to become a member of the Council of Public Liberal Arts Colleges. The school was founded in 1922 as Wichita Falls Junior College and was renamed Hardin Junior College in 1937 when it moved to its present location off Taft Boulevard. In 1946, when a senior division was added, it was renamed Hardin College. In January 1950, the name changed to Midwestern University, with the junior college division remaining Hardin Junior College. Their athletic program also competes in the Lone Star Conference as a part of the NCAA Division II.

=== Texas Tech University ===
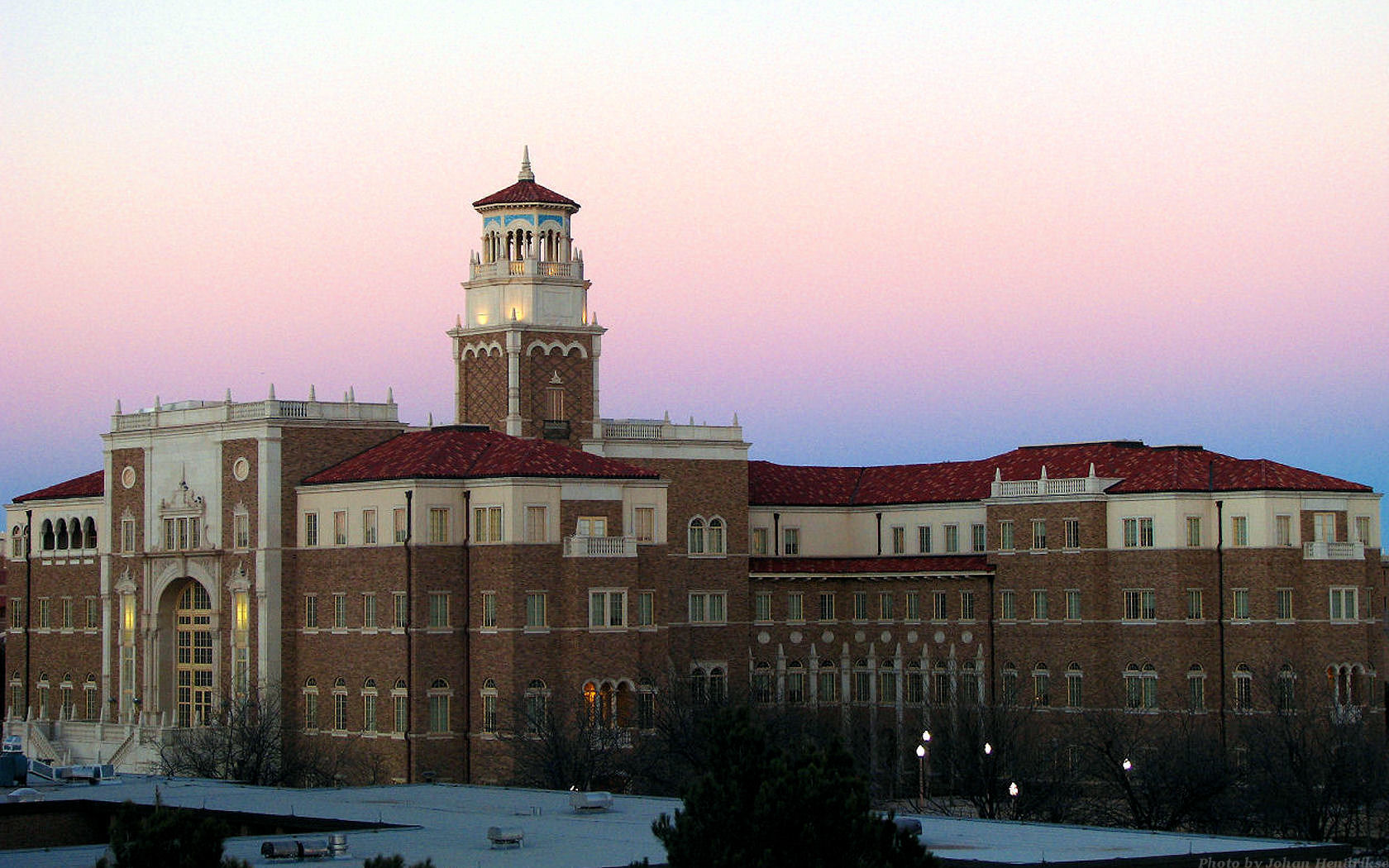
Texas Tech University

Texas Tech University was founded in 1923, is a public, coeducational, doctoral/research university, and is the system flagship. Current enrollment totals 40,666 students in fall 2021. The main campus is located in Lubbock, Texas, and is bordered by Marsha Sharp Freeway (4th Street), 19th Street, University Avenue, and Quaker Avenue. Their athletic program competes in the Big XII Conference as a part of the NCAA Division I. It operates several satellite campuses and centers outside of Lubbock, listed in the next section. Texas Tech University consists of 13 colleges and schools and offers 150 degree programs.

=== Texas Tech University Health Sciences Center ===
Texas Tech University Health Sciences Center was created as the Texas Tech University School of Medicine by the 61st Texas Legislature in 1969. In 1979, the charter was expanded to create the Texas Tech University Health Sciences Center. The university's enrollment was a record 5,423 in fall 2021. Texas Tech University Health Sciences Center has five schools and operates on six campuses in addition to the main campus in Lubbock, Texas. TTUHSC's five schools are the Graduate School of Biomedical Sciences, School of Health Professions, School of Medicine, School of Nursing and the Jerry H. Hodge School of Pharmacy, which is headquartered in Amarillo, Texas. The institution has campuses located in Abilene, Amarillo, Dallas, Lubbock, Midland and Odessa.

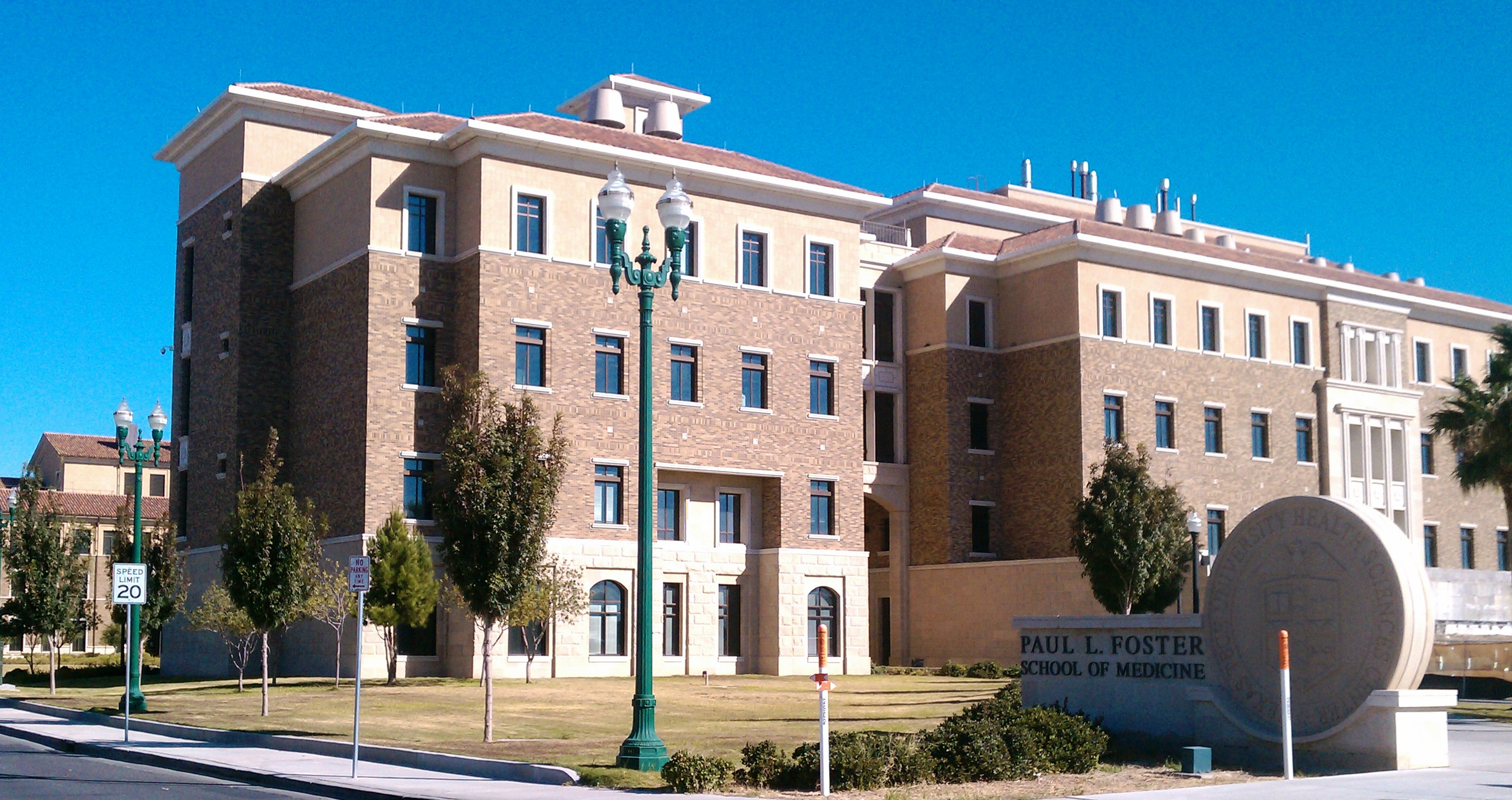
Paul L. Foster School of Medicine

=== Texas Tech University Health Sciences Center El Paso ===
On May 18, 2013, Texas Tech University Health Sciences Center El Paso (TTUHSC El Paso) was established as a separate university from TTUHSC. The university is made up of four schools: Gayle Greve Hunt School of Nursing, Paul L. Foster School of Medicine, L. Frederick Francis Graduate School of Biomedical Sciences and Woody L. Hunt School of Dental Medicine.

== Governance and administration ==
=== Board of Regents ===
The government, control, and direction of the Texas Tech University System is vested in a nine-member Board of Regents appointed by the governor and confirmed by the legislature. Each Regent serves a six-year term, and appointments are staggered so that three members of the Board's terms expire in odd-numbered years. In addition to the nine members, there also is a student regent who is appointed by the governor to serve a one-year term that begins on June 1 of each year.

In 1923, Governor Pat Neff appointed the first members of the Board of Directors of Texas Technological College (as the council was known until 1969). When the name of Texas Technological College was changed in 1969, so did the council to: Board of Regents of Texas Tech University. The council has been known by its current name, Board of Regents of the Texas Tech University System, after the Texas Tech University System was established in 1996.

=== Chancellor ===
The Chancellor is the chief executive officer of the Texas Tech University System appointed by, and responsible to, the Board of Regents. The Chancellor carries out the policies of the System as determined by the Regents and has direct responsibility for all aspects of the operations of the Texas Tech University System's six primary components: Texas Tech University, Texas Tech University Health Sciences Center, Angelo State University, Texas Tech University Health Sciences Center El Paso, Midwestern State University and the Texas Tech University System Administration.

The Texas Tech University System has had five Chancellors: John T. Montford, David Smith, Kent Hance, Robert L. Duncan, and Tedd L. Mitchell. Mitchell announced his retirement from the position on July 11, 2025. On September 4, 2025, Texas Senator Brandon Creighton was unanimously selected as the sole finalist for the chancellor and chief executive officer position. He will assume the role effective November 19, 2025.

=== Presidents ===
The presidents of Texas Tech University, Texas Tech University Health Sciences Center, Angelo State University, Texas Tech University Health Sciences Center El Paso and Midwestern State University are appointed by the Chancellor and are the CEOs of their respective institutions and responsible for the strategic operation of each institution.

== Campuses ==
The five institutions of the Texas Tech University System are located on multiple campuses and academic sites.

=== Angelo State University ===
- San Angelo, Texas

=== Midwestern State University ===
- Wichita Falls, Texas (main campus)

=== Texas Tech University ===
- Amarillo, Texas (School of Veterinary Medicine)
- Cleburne, Texas (Hill College campus)
- El Paso, Texas (College of Architecture branch)
- Escazú, San José, Costa Rica (Costa Rica campus)
- Fredericksburg, Texas
- Junction, Texas
- Lubbock, Texas (Main campus)
- Marble Falls, Texas (Texas Tech University at Highland Lakes)
- McKinney (Collin College campus)
- Rockwall, Texas
- Sherman, Texas (Austin College campus)
- Seville, Spain (Spain campus)
- Waco, Texas

=== Texas Tech University Health Sciences Center ===
- Abilene, Texas
- Amarillo, Texas
- Dallas, Texas
- Lubbock, Texas
- Mansfield, Texas
- Midland, Texas
- Odessa, Texas

=== Texas Tech University Health Sciences Center El Paso ===
- El Paso, Texas
