= John T. Montford =

American politician

Member of the Texas Senate from the 28th district
- In office 1983–1996
- Preceded by: E. L. Short
- Succeeded by: Robert L. Duncan

Personal details
- Born: John Thomas Montford; June 28, 1943 (age 83) Fort Worth, Texas, U.S.
- Party: Democratic
- Spouses: ? (divorced) Debra Kay Mears (m. 1975)
- Children: Mindy M. Montford Melonie Ann Montford DeRose John Ross Montford
- Education: University of Texas at Austin (BA, JD)
- Occupation: Lawyer; Businessman; University chancellor

Military service
- Allegiance: United States
- Branch/service: United States Marine Corps
- Years of service: 1968-1971

John Thomas Montford (born June 28, 1943) is a business consultant in San Antonio, Texas, who is a former member of the Texas State Senate from District 28, based about Lubbock in West Texas. He is a former district attorney for Lubbock County and a former chancellor of the Texas Tech University System.

== Political life ==
A native of Fort Worth, Montford graduated in 1965 from the University of Texas at Austin. He received his juris doctor degree in 1968 from the University of Texas School of Law. He was a judge advocate in the United States Marine Corps from 1968 to 1971. Thereafter, he became a practicing attorney in Lubbock. A Democrat, he was elected in 1978 as district attorney, in which capacity he acquired the sobriquet "Maximum John" for his vigorous prosecution of crime and demand for lengthy sentences.

Montford did not seek a second term as DA in 1982. Instead, he ran for and was elected to the state Senate. He unseated E. L. Short in the Democratic primary election and then defeated Republican Jim Reese, the former mayor of Odessa, in the general election. Montford served in the Senate from 1983 to 1996, during which time he was the chairman of the Senate Finance Committee and the Senate President Pro Tem. He was a member of the Legislative Budget Board and the Legislative Audit Committee. He joined with Ron Givens of Lubbock to create an additional county court at-law judgeship for Lubbock County. Montford authored the Statewide Water Package, approved by Texas voters in November 1985. Texas Monthly magazine named Montford among its "Top 10 Best Legislators" for five legislative sessions. He was "Governor for the Day" on April 24, 1993.

On leaving the Senate, he became the first chancellor of the newly established Texas Tech University System, a position which he maintained for five years until 2001. In February 1998, chancellor Montford announced a fundraising goal of $300 million to underwrite university improvements. Instead, donors contributed $500 million, which allowed for construction of the United Spirit Arena and renovations to Jones AT&T Stadium and several academic buildings. Mrs. Montford, the former Debra Kay Mears (born 1952), known as Debbie Montford, was involved in beautification of the Texas Tech campus while her husband was the chancellor. In 1999, Montford was named by the Lubbock Avalanche-Journal as Lubbock's "Most Influential Person".

In a 2012 radio appearance in Lubbock, Montford endorsed the legalization of casino gambling in Texas. Montford said that Texans are already traveling to Louisiana, New Mexico, and Oklahoma to gamble, and the state should earmark those otherwise lost revenues to public use.

== Business career ==
In 2001, Montford relocated to San Antonio, where he became involved in a succession of large business enterprises, beginning with the vice presidency for external affairs and then the presidency of Southwestern Bell, or SBC Communications, which was thereafter absorbed by American Telephone and Telegraph Company. John and Debbie Montford are civic leaders in San Antonio, having raised money for charities, educational institutions, and nonprofit organizations, including the San Antonio Symphony and the University of Texas at San Antonio. He pushed for the establishment of the UTSA Presidents Dinner, which in 2007 raised $4.6 million, a large bonanza for a commuter educational institution.

Since January 2010, Montford has been the president and chief executive officer of his own company, JTM Consulting, LLC. General Motors retained his firm as a consultant, in which assignment Montford was the senior advisor of government relations and global public policy until January 2012. Prior to the establishment of his own company, Montford had been mentioned in 2009 as a potential candidate for mayor of San Antonio. However, he did not run for the nonpartisan position, and victory instead went to another Democrat, Julian Castro.

Montford serves on the board of directors of Southwest Airlines.

== Family ==
John and Debra Montford have two children, Melonie Ann Montford DeRose (born 1978) and Dr. John Ross Montford (born 1981). Montford's daughter from a previous marriage, Mindy, was born in 1970 in North Carolina while he was in the Marines. She is a lawyer in Austin, where she was primarily reared after her parents' divorce. She lived in Lubbock only from 1970 to 1976. Mindy Montford, as she is known, lost a high-profile Democratic primary race in 2008 for district attorney of Travis County to succeed her then-boss, Ronnie Earle. In 2010, Mindy Montford lost a Democrat runoff election for a state district court judgeship in Travis County. In 2010, Governor Rick Perry appointed Debra Montford, a native of Littlefield in Lamb County, to the Texas Tech board of regents to a term that extends until 2017. Mrs. Montford attended Texas Tech and the University of Texas.

Upon their deaths, John and Debra Montford will be interred at the Texas State Cemetery in Austin.

Preceded by E L Short	Texas State Senator (District 28); 1983–1996	Succeeded by Robert L. Duncan
