= Texas's 28th Senate district =

American legislative district

Texas's 28th State Senate district
Senator
| Charles Perry; R–Lubbock |
- Demographics: 53.3% White; 6.8% Black; 38.1% Hispanic; 1.7% Asian
- Population: 799,687

District 28 of the Texas Senate is a senatorial district that currently serves Baylor, Childress, Coleman, Collingsworth, Concho, Cottle, Crosby, Dickens, Donley, Fisher, Floyd, Foard, Garza, Gray, Hale, Hardeman, Haskell, Hockley, Jones, Kent, King, Knox, Lamb, Lubbock, Lynn, Mason, McCulloch, Menard, Mills, Motley, Nolan, Runnels, San Saba, Stonewall, Taylor, Terry, Throckmorton, Tom Green, Wheeler, Wilbarger counties and a portion of Wichita county in the U.S. state of Texas.

The current senator from District 28 is Charles Perry.

== Biggest cities in the district ==
District 28 has a population of 778,341 with 586,992 that is at voting age from the 2010 census.

| | Name | County | Pop. (Note: Population is based on the number of people in the district in that city, not the overall population of that city) |
|---|---|---|---|
| 1 | Lubbock | Lubbock | 229,573 |
| 2 | San Angelo | Tom Green | 93,200 |
| 3 | Abilene | Jones/Taylor | 38,346 |
| 4 | Plainview | Hale | 22,194 |
| 5 | Levelland | Hockley | 13,542 |

== Election history ==
Election history of District 28 from 1992. (Note: Uncontested primary elections are not shown.)

=== 2022 ===
Charles Perry (Republican) was unopposed; as such, the election was cancelled and Perry was declared elected without a vote.

=== 2020 ===
Texas general election, 2020: Senate District 28
| Party | Candidate | Votes | % | ±% |
|---|---|---|---|---|
| Republican | Charles Perry | 248,025 | 100.00 | |
| Turnout | | 248,025 | 100.00 | |
| Republican hold | | | | |

=== 2016 ===
Texas general election, 2016: Senate District 28
| Party | Candidate | Votes | % | ±% |
|---|---|---|---|---|
| Republican | Charles Perry | 205,512 | 100.00 | |
| Turnout | | 205,512 | | |
| Republican hold | | | | |

=== 2014 (special) ===
Texas Senate District 28 special election - 9 September 2014
| Party | Candidate | Votes | % | ±% |
|---|---|---|---|---|
| Republican | Charles Perry | 22,860 | 53.39 | |
| Republican | Jodey Arrington | 12,958 | 30.26 | |
| Democratic | Greg Wortham | 5,616 | 13.12 | |
| Republican | Delwin Jones | 677 | 1.58 | |
| Libertarian | Kerry Douglas McKennon | 358 | 0.84 | |
| Republican | E.M. Garza | 347 | 0.81 | |
| Turnout | | 42,816 | | |
| Republican hold | | | | |

=== 2012 ===
Texas general election, 2012: Senate District 28
| Party | Candidate | Votes | % | ±% |
|---|---|---|---|---|
| Republican | Robert L. Duncan (Incumbent) | 183,619 | 86.39 | |
| Libertarian | M.J. Smith | 28,932 | 13.61 | |
| Turnout | | 212,551 | | |
| Republican hold | | | | |

=== 2008 ===
Texas general election, 2008: Senate District 28
| Party | Candidate | Votes | % | ±% |
|---|---|---|---|---|
| Republican | Robert L. Duncan (Incumbent) | 179,059 | 88.17 | |
| Libertarian | M.J. Smith | 24,022 | 11.83 | |
| Turnout | | 203,081 | | |
| Republican hold | | | | |

=== 2004 ===
Texas general election, 2004: Senate District 28
| Party | Candidate | Votes | % | ±% |
|---|---|---|---|---|
| Republican | Robert L. Duncan (Incumbent) | 176,588 | 100.00 | +8.68 |
| Majority | | 176,588 | 100.00 | +17.37 |
| Turnout | | 176,588 | | +34.85 |
| Republican hold | | | | |

=== 2002 ===
Texas general election, 2002: Senate District 28
| Party | Candidate | Votes | % | ±% |
|---|---|---|---|---|
| Republican | Robert Duncan (Incumbent) | 119,580 | 91.32 | −8.68 |
| Libertarian | Jon Ensor | 11,372 | 8.8 | +8.68 |
| Majority | | 108,208 | 82.63 | −17.37 |
| Turnout | | 130,952 | | +58.98 |
| Republican hold | | | | |

=== 1998 ===
Texas general election, 1998: Senate District 28
| Party | Candidate | Votes | % | ±% |
|---|---|---|---|---|
| Republican | Robert Duncan (Incumbent) | 82,368 | 100.00 | +64.21 |
| Majority | | 82,368 | 100.00 | +71.58 |
| Turnout | | 82,368 | | −32.78 |
| Republican hold | | | | |

=== 1996 (special) ===
Texas Senate District 28 special runoff election - 5 November 1996
| Party | Candidate | Votes | % | ±% |
|---|---|---|---|---|
| Republican | Robert L. Duncan | 32,489 | 56.82 | +26.42 |
| Democratic | David R. Langston | 24,686 | 43.18 | +18.89 |
| Majority | | 7,803 | 13.65 | |
| Turnout | | 57,175 | | |
| Republican gain from Democratic | | | | |

Texas Senate District 28 special election - 5 November 1996
| Party | Candidate | Votes | % |
|---|---|---|---|
| Republican | Robert L. Duncan | 45,106 | 30.41 |
| Democratic | David R. Langston | 36,032 | 24.29 |
| Republican | Tim Lambert | 18,885 | 12.73 |
| Democratic | Gary Watkins | 18,652 | 12.57 |
| Republican | Monte Hasie | 13,303 | 8.97 |
| Democratic | Lorenzo "Bubba" Sedeno | 12,419 | 8.37 |
| Republican | Dick Bowen | 3,938 | 2.65 |
| Turnout | | 148,335 | |

=== 1994 ===
Texas general election, 1994: Senate District 28
| Party | Candidate | Votes | % | ±% |
|---|---|---|---|---|
| Democratic | John T. Montford (Incumbent) | 78,676 | 64.21 | −0.15 |
| Republican | Val Varley | 43,854 | 35.79 | +2.79 |
| Majority | | 34,822 | 28.42 | −2.93 |
| Turnout | | 122,530 | | −29.20 |
| Democratic hold | | | | |

=== 1992 ===
Texas general election, 1992: Senate District 28
| Party | Candidate | Votes | % | ±% |
|---|---|---|---|---|
| Democratic | John T. Montford (Incumbent) | 111,384 | 64.36 | |
| Republican | Geo. Gray | 57,119 | 33.00 | |
| Libertarian | E. A. Addington | 4,572 | 2.64 | |
| Majority | | 54,265 | 31.35 | |
| Turnout | | 173,075 | | |
| Democratic hold | | | | |

== District officeholders ==
| Legislature | Senator, District 28 | Counties in District |
|---|---|---|
| 5 | Edwin B. Scarborough | Cameron, Hidalgo. |
| 6 | Edwin B. Scarborough | Cameron, Hidalgo. |
| 7 | Edwin B. Scarborough | Cameron, Hidalgo. |
| 8 | Edwin B. Scarborough | Cameron, Hidalgo. |
| 9 | George Bernard Erath; George E. Burney | All of Bosque, Brown, Callahan, Coleman, Comanche, Coryell, Eastland, Falls, Hamilton, Hill, McLennan, Runnels, Taylor. Portion of Ellis. |
| 10 | George E. Burney | All of Bosque, Brown, Callahan, Coleman, Comanche, Coryell, Eastland, Falls, Hamilton, Hill, McLennan, Runnels, Taylor. Portion of Ellis. |
| 11 | George E. Burney | Bosque, Brown, Callahan, Coleman, Comanche, Coryell, Eastland, Falls, Hamilton, Hill, McLennan, Runnels, Taylor. |
| 12 | Marmion Henry Bowers | Bell, Brown, Coleman, Comanche, Concho, Coryell, Hamilton, Hays, Lampasas, McCulloch, Runnels, San Saba, Travis, Williamson. |
| 13 | Nathan George Shelley | Bell, Brown, Coleman, Comanche, Concho, Coryell, Hamilton, Hays, Lampasas, McCulloch, Runnels, San Saba, Travis, Williamson. |
| 14 | William H. Westfall | Blanco, Burnet, Concho, Lampasas, Llano, McCulloch, San Saba, Travis, Williamson. |
| 15 | William Henry Crain; Ellsberry R. Lane | Aransas, Atascosa, Bee, Calhoun, DeWitt, Goliad, Jackson, Karnes, Refugio, Victoria, Wilson. |
| 16 | Ellsberry R. Lane | Aransas, Atascosa, Bee, Calhoun, DeWitt, Goliad, Jackson, Karnes, Refugio, Victoria, Wilson. |
| 17 | Ellsberry R. Lane; Lucas H. Brown | Aransas, Atascosa, Bee, Calhoun, DeWitt, Goliad, Jackson, Karnes, Refugio, Victoria, Wilson. |
| 18 | Augustus W. Houston | Bandera, Bexar, Crockett, Edwards, El Paso, Gillespie, Kerr, Kimble, Mason, Medina, Menard, Pecos, Presidio, Tom Green. |
| 19 | Augustus W. Houston | Bandera, Bexar, Crockett, Edwards, El Paso, Gillespie, Kerr, Kimble, Mason, Medina, Menard, Pecos, Presidio, Tom Green. |
| 20 | Robert Hance Burney | Bandera, Bexar, Crockett, Edwards, El Paso, Gillespie, Kerr, Kimble, Mason, Medina, Menard, Pecos, Presidio, Tom Green. |
| 21 | Robert Hance Burney | Bandera, Bexar, Crockett, Edwards, El Paso, Gillespie, Kerr, Kimble, Mason, Medina, Menard, Pecos, Presidio, Tom Green. |
| 22 | Robert Hance Burney | Bandera, Bexar, Crockett, Edwards, El Paso, Gillespie, Kerr, Kimble, Mason, Medina, Menard, Pecos, Presidio, Tom Green. |
| 23 | John C. Baldwin | Andrews, Borden, Callahan, Crane, Dawson, Eastland, Ector, Fisher, Gaines, Garza, Glasscock, Haskell, Howard, Jones, Kent, Loving, Lynn, Martin, Midland, Mitchell, Nolan, Palo Pinto, Reeves, Scurry, Shackelford, Stephens, Stonewall, Taylor, Terry, Upton, Ward, Winkler, Yoakum. |
| 24 | R. D. Gage | Andrews, Borden, Callahan, Crane, Dawson, Eastland, Ector, Fisher, Gaines, Garza, Glasscock, Haskell, Howard, Jones, Kent, Loving, Lynn, Martin, Midland, Mitchell, Nolan, Palo Pinto, Reeves, Scurry, Stephens, Stonewall, Taylor, Terry, Upton, Ward, Winkler, Yoakum. |
| 25 | Henry A. Tillett | Andrews, Borden, Callahan, Crane, Dawson, Eastland, Ector, Fisher, Gaines, Garza, Glasscock, Haskell, Howard, Jones, Kent, Loving, Lynn, Martin, Midland, Mitchell, Nolan, Palo Pinto, Reeves, Scurry, Shackelford, Stephens, Stonewall, Taylor, Terry, Upton, Ward, Winkler, Yoakum. |
| 26 | William P. Sebastian | Andrews, Borden, Callahan, Crane, Dawson, Eastland, Ector, Fisher, Gaines, Garza, Glasscock, Haskell, Howard, Jones, Kent, Loving, Lynn, Martin, Midland, Mitchell, Nolan, Palo Pinto, Reeves, Scurry, Shackelford, Stephens, Stonewall, Taylor, Terry, Upton, Ward, Winkler, Yoakum. |
| 27 | William P. Sebastian | Andrews, Borden, Callahan, Crane, Dawson, Eastland, Ector, Fisher, Gaines, Garza, Glasscock, Haskell, Howard, Jones, Kent, Loving, Lynn, Martin, Midland, Mitchell, Nolan, Palo Pinto, Reeves, Scurry, Shackelford, Stephens, Stonewall, Taylor, Terry, Upton, Ward, Winkler, Yoakum. |
| 28 | William P. Sebastian | Andrews, Borden, Callahan, Crane, Dawson, Eastland, Ector, Fisher, Gaines, Garza, Glasscock, Haskell, Howard, Jones, Kent, Loving, Lynn, Martin, Midland, Mitchell, Nolan, Palo Pinto, Scurry, Shackelford, Stephens, Stonewall, Taylor, Terry, Upton, Ward, Winkler, Yoakum. |
| 29 | Albert S. Hawkins; William J. Cunningham | Andrews, Borden, Callahan, Crane, Dawson, Eastland, Ector, Fisher, Gaines, Garza, Glasscock, Haskell, Howard, Jones, Kent, Loving, Lynn, Martin, Midland, Mitchell, Nolan, Palo Pinto, Scurry, Shackelford, Stephens, Stonewall, Taylor, Terry, Upton, Ward, Winkler, Yoakum. |
| 30 | William J. Cunningham | Andrews, Borden, Callahan, Crane, Dawson, Eastland, Ector, Fisher, Gaines, Garza, Glasscock, Haskell, Howard, Jones, Kent, Loving, Lynn, Martin, Midland, Mitchell, Nolan, Palo Pinto, Scurry, Shackelford, Stephens, Stonewall, Taylor, Terry, Upton, Ward, Winkler, Yoakum. |
| 31 | W. John Bryan | Andrews, Borden, Callahan, Crane, Dawson, Eastland, Ector, Fisher, Gaines, Garza, Glasscock, Haskell, Howard, Jones, Kent, Loving, Lynn, Martin, Midland, Mitchell, Nolan, Palo Pinto, Scurry, Shackelford, Stephens, Stonewall, Taylor, Terry, Upton, Ward, Winkler, Yoakum. |
| 32 | W. John Bryan | Andrews, Borden, Callahan, Crane, Dawson, Eastland, Ector, Fisher, Gaines, Garza, Glasscock, Haskell, Howard, Jones, Kent, Loving, Lynn, Martin, Midland, Mitchell, Nolan, Palo Pinto, Scurry, Shackelford, Stephens, Stonewall, Taylor, Terry, Upton, Ward, Winkler, Yoakum. |
| 33 | Homer P. Brelsford | Andrews, Borden, Callahan, Crane, Dawson, Eastland, Ector, Fisher, Gaines, Garza, Glasscock, Haskell, Howard, Jones, Kent, Loving, Lynn, Martin, Midland, Mitchell, Nolan, Palo Pinto, Scurry, Shackelford, Stephens, Stonewall, Taylor, Terry, Upton, Ward, Winkler, Yoakum. |
| 34 | Homer P. Brelsford | Andrews, Borden, Callahan, Crane, Dawson, Eastland, Ector, Fisher, Gaines, Garza, Glasscock, Haskell, Howard, Jones, Kent, Loving, Lynn, Martin, Midland, Mitchell, Nolan, Palo Pinto, Scurry, Shackelford, Stephens, Stonewall, Taylor, Terry, Upton, Ward, Winkler, Yoakum. |
| 35 | Charles R. Buchanan | Andrews, Borden, Callahan, Crane, Dawson, Eastland, Ector, Fisher, Gaines, Garza, Glasscock, Haskell, Howard, Jones, Kent, Loving, Lynn, Martin, Midland, Mitchell, Nolan, Palo Pinto, Scurry, Shackelford, Stephens, Stonewall, Taylor, Terry, Upton, Ward, Winkler, Yoakum. |
| 36 | Charles R. Buchanan | Andrews, Borden, Callahan, Crane, Dawson, Eastland, Ector, Fisher, Gaines, Garza, Glasscock, Haskell, Howard, Jones, Kent, Loving, Lynn, Martin, Midland, Mitchell, Nolan, Palo Pinto, Scurry, Shackelford, Stephens, Stonewall, Taylor, Terry, Upton, Ward, Winkler, Yoakum. |
| 37 | John A. Russell; Joe Burkett | Andrews, Borden, Callahan, Crane, Dawson, Eastland, Ector, Fisher, Gaines, Garza, Glasscock, Haskell, Howard, Jones, Kent, Loving, Lynn, Martin, Midland, Mitchell, Nolan, Palo Pinto, Scurry, Shackelford, Stephens, Stonewall, Taylor, Terry, Upton, Ward, Winkler, Yoakum. |
| 38 | Joe Burkett | Andrews, Borden, Callahan, Crane, Dawson, Eastland, Ector, Fisher, Gaines, Garza, Glasscock, Haskell, Howard, Jones, Kent, Loving, Lynn, Martin, Midland, Mitchell, Nolan, Palo Pinto, Scurry, Shackelford, Stephens, Stonewall, Taylor, Terry, Upton, Ward, Winkler, Yoakum. |
| 39 | Robert A. Stuart | Tarrant. |
| 40 | Robert A. Stuart; Julian C. Hyer | Tarrant. |
| 41 | Julian C. Hyer | Tarrant. |
| 42 | Frank H. Rawlings | Tarrant. |
| 43 | Frank H. Rawlings | Tarrant. |
| 44 | Frank H. Rawlings | Tarrant. |
| 45 | Frank H. Rawlings | Tarrant. |
| 46 | Jesse Martin | Tarrant. |
| 47 | Jesse Martin | Tarrant. |
| 48 | Jesse Martin | Tarrant. |
| 49 | Jesse Martin | Tarrant. |
| 50 | Keith F. Kelly | Tarrant. |
| 51 | Keith F. Kelly | Tarrant. |
| 52 | Keith F. Kelly | Tarrant. |
| 53 | Kilmer B. Corbin | Andrews, Cochran, Crosby, Dawson, Gaines, Hockley, Lubbock, Lynn, Martin, Terry, Yoakum. |
| 54 | Kilmer B. Corbin | Andrews, Cochran, Crosby, Dawson, Gaines, Hockley, Lubbock, Lynn, Martin, Terry, Yoakum. |
| 55 | Preston Smith | Andrews, Cochran, Crosby, Dawson, Gaines, Hockley, Lubbock, Lynn, Martin, Terry, Yoakum. |
| 56 | Preston Smith | Andrews, Cochran, Crosby, Dawson, Gaines, Hockley, Lubbock, Lynn, Martin, Terry, Yoakum. |
| 57 | Preston Smith | Andrews, Cochran, Crosby, Dawson, Gaines, Hockley, Lubbock, Lynn, Martin, Terry, Yoakum. |
| 58 | H. J. "Doc" Blanchard | Andrews, Cochran, Crosby, Dawson, Gaines, Hockley, Lubbock, Lynn, Martin, Terry, Yoakum. |
| 59 | H. J. "Doc" Blanchard | Andrews, Cochran, Crosby, Dawson, Gaines, Hockley, Lubbock, Lynn, Martin, Terry, Yoakum. |
| 60 | H. J. "Doc" Blanchard | Andrews, Cochran, Crosby, Dawson, Gaines, Hockley, Lubbock, Lynn, Martin, Terry, Ward, Winkler, Yoakum. |
| 61 | H. J. "Doc" Blanchard | Andrews, Cochran, Crosby, Dawson, Gaines, Hockley, Lubbock, Lynn, Martin, Terry, Ward, Winkler, Yoakum. |
| 62 | H. J. "Doc" Blanchard | Andrews, Cochran, Crosby, Dawson, Gaines, Hockley, Lubbock, Lynn, Martin, Terry, Ward, Winkler, Yoakum. |
| 63 | H. J. "Doc" Blanchard | Andrews, Borden, Cochran, Crosby, Dawson, Ector, Gaines, Garza, Lubbock, Lynn, Martin, Terry, Yoakum. |
| 64 | Kent Hance | Andrews, Borden, Cochran, Crosby, Dawson, Ector, Gaines, Garza, Lubbock, Lynn, Martin, Terry, Yoakum. |
| 65 | Kent Hance | Andrews, Borden, Cochran, Crosby, Dawson, Ector, Gaines, Garza, Lubbock, Lynn, Martin, Terry, Yoakum. |
| 66 | E. L. Short | Andrews, Borden, Cochran, Crosby, Dawson, Ector, Gaines, Garza, Lubbock, Lynn, Martin, Terry, Yoakum. |
| 67 | E. L. Short | Andrews, Borden, Cochran, Crosby, Dawson, Ector, Gaines, Garza, Lubbock, Lynn, Martin, Terry, Yoakum. |
| 68 | John T. Montford | Andrews, Borden, Cochran, Crosby, Dawson, Ector, Gaines, Garza, Howard, Lubbock, Lynn, Martin, Terry, Yoakum. |
| 69 | John T. Montford | Andrews, Borden, Cochran, Crosby, Dawson, Ector, Gaines, Garza, Howard, Lubbock, Lynn, Martin, Terry, Yoakum. |
| 70 | John T. Montford | Andrews, Borden, Cochran, Crosby, Dawson, Ector, Gaines, Garza, Howard, Lubbock, Lynn, Martin, Terry, Yoakum. |
| 71 | John T. Montford | Andrews, Borden, Cochran, Crosby, Dawson, Ector, Gaines, Garza, Howard, Lubbock, Lynn, Martin, Terry, Yoakum. |
| 72 | John T. Montford | Andrews, Borden, Cochran, Crosby, Dawson, Ector, Gaines, Garza, Howard, Lubbock, Lynn, Martin, Terry, Yoakum. |
| 73 | John T. Montford | Borden, Castro, Crane, Crosby, Dawson, Ector, Garza, Glasscock, Hale, Hockley, Howard, Lamb, Loving, Lubbock, Lynn, Martin, Reagan, Swisher, Terry, Upton, Ward, Winkler. |
| 74 | John T. Montford; Robert L. Duncan | All of Borden, Crane, Crosby, Dawson, Garza, Glasscock, Hale, Hockley, Howard, Hudspeth, Irion, Lamb, Loving, Lubbock, Lynn, Martin, Reagan, Reeves, Sterling, Terry, Upton, Ward. Portions of Culberson, Ector, El Paso, Tom Green. |
| 75 | Robert L. Duncan | All of Borden, Crane, Crosby, Dawson, Garza, Glasscock, Hale, Hockley, Howard, Hudspeth, Irion, Lamb, Loving, Lubbock, Lynn, Martin, Reagan, Reeves, Sterling, Terry, Upton, Ward. Portions of Culberson, Ector, El Paso, Tom Green. |
| 76 | Robert L. Duncan | All of Borden, Crane, Crosby, Dawson, Garza, Glasscock, Hale, Hockley, Howard, Hudspeth, Irion, Lamb, Loving, Lubbock, Lynn, Martin, Reagan, Reeves, Sterling, Terry, Upton, Ward. Portions of Culberson, Ector, El Paso, Tom Green. |
| 77 | Robert L. Duncan | All of Borden, Crane, Crosby, Dawson, Garza, Glasscock, Hale, Hockley, Howard, Hudspeth, Irion, Lamb, Loving, Lubbock, Lynn, Martin, Reagan, Reeves, Sterling, Terry, Upton, Ward. Portions of Culberson, Ector, El Paso, Tom Green. |
| 78 | Robert L. Duncan | Armstrong, Borden, Briscoe, Carson, Castro, Childress, Coke, Collingsworth, Concho, Cottle, Crosby, Dawson, Dickens, Donley, Fisher, Floyd, Foard, Garza, Gray, Hale, Hall, Hardeman, Haskell, Hockley, Irion, Jones, Kent, King, Knox, Lamb, Lubbock, Lynn, Mitchell, Motley, Nolan, Reagan, Runnels, Schleicher, Scurry, Sterling, Stonewall, Swisher, Terry, Tom Green, Upton, Wheeler. |
| 79 | Robert L. Duncan | Armstrong, Borden, Briscoe, Carson, Castro, Childress, Coke, Collingsworth, Concho, Cottle, Crosby, Dawson, Dickens, Donley, Fisher, Floyd, Foard, Garza, Gray, Hale, Hall, Hardeman, Haskell, Hockley, Irion, Jones, Kent, King, Knox, Lamb, Lubbock, Lynn, Mitchell, Motley, Nolan, Reagan, Runnels, Schleicher, Scurry, Sterling, Stonewall, Swisher, Terry, Tom Green, Upton, Wheeler. |
| 80 | Robert L. Duncan | Armstrong, Borden, Briscoe, Carson, Castro, Childress, Coke, Collingsworth, Concho, Cottle, Crosby, Dawson, Dickens, Donley, Fisher, Floyd, Foard, Garza, Gray, Hale, Hall, Hardeman, Haskell, Hockley, Irion, Jones, Kent, King, Knox, Lamb, Lubbock, Lynn, Mitchell, Motley, Nolan, Reagan, Runnels, Schleicher, Scurry, Sterling, Stonewall, Swisher, Terry, Tom Green, Upton, Wheeler. |
| 81 | Robert L. Duncan | Armstrong, Borden, Briscoe, Carson, Castro, Childress, Coke, Collingsworth, Concho, Cottle, Crosby, Dawson, Dickens, Donley, Fisher, Floyd, Foard, Garza, Gray, Hale, Hall, Hardeman, Haskell, Hockley, Irion, Jones, Kent, King, Knox, Lamb, Lubbock, Lynn, Mitchell, Motley, Nolan, Reagan, Runnels, Schleicher, Scurry, Sterling, Stonewall, Swisher, Terry, Tom Green, Upton, Wheeler. |
| 82 | Robert L. Duncan | Armstrong, Borden, Briscoe, Carson, Castro, Childress, Coke, Collingsworth, Concho, Cottle, Crosby, Dawson, Dickens, Donley, Fisher, Floyd, Foard, Garza, Gray, Hale, Hall, Hardeman, Haskell, Hockley, Irion, Jones, Kent, King, Knox, Lamb, Lubbock, Lynn, Mitchell, Motley, Nolan, Reagan, Runnels, Schleicher, Scurry, Sterling, Stonewall, Swisher, Terry, Tom Green, Upton, Wheeler. |
| 83 | Robert L. Duncan; Charles Perry | All of Baylor, Borden, Childress, Coke, Coleman, Concho, Cottle, Crane, Crosby, Dawson, Dickens, Eastland, Fisher, Floyd, Foard, Garza, Hale, Hardeman, Haskell, Hockley, Irion, Jones, Kent, Kimble, King, Knox, Lamb, Lubbock, Lynn, Mason, McCulloch, Menard, Mitchell, Motley, Nolan, Reagan, Runnels, Schleicher, Scurry, Shackelford, Stephens, Sterling, Stonewall, Sutton, Terry, Throckmorton, Tom Green, Upton, Ward, Wilbarger. Portions of Taylor. |
| 84 | Charles Perry | All of Baylor, Borden, Childress, Coke, Coleman, Concho, Cottle, Crane, Crosby, Dawson, Dickens, Eastland, Fisher, Floyd, Foard, Garza, Hale, Hardeman, Haskell, Hockley, Irion, Jones, Kent, Kimble, King, Knox, Lamb, Lubbock, Lynn, Mason, McCulloch, Menard, Mitchell, Motley, Nolan, Reagan, Runnels, Schleicher, Scurry, Shackelford, Stephens, Sterling, Stonewall, Sutton, Terry, Throckmorton, Tom Green, Upton, Ward, Wilbarger. Portions of Taylor. |
| 85 | Charles Perry | All of Baylor, Borden, Childress, Coke, Coleman, Concho, Cottle, Crane, Crosby, Dawson, Dickens, Eastland, Fisher, Floyd, Foard, Garza, Hale, Hardeman, Haskell, Hockley, Irion, Jones, Kent, Kimble, King, Knox, Lamb, Lubbock, Lynn, Mason, McCulloch, Menard, Mitchell, Motley, Nolan, Reagan, Runnels, Schleicher, Scurry, Shackelford, Stephens, Sterling, Stonewall, Sutton, Terry, Throckmorton, Tom Green, Upton, Ward, Wilbarger. Portions of Taylor. |
| 86 | Charles Perry | All of Baylor, Borden, Childress, Coke, Coleman, Concho, Cottle, Crane, Crosby, Dawson, Dickens, Eastland, Fisher, Floyd, Foard, Garza, Hale, Hardeman, Haskell, Hockley, Irion, Jones, Kent, Kimble, King, Knox, Lamb, Lubbock, Lynn, Mason, McCulloch, Menard, Mitchell, Motley, Nolan, Reagan, Runnels, Schleicher, Scurry, Shackelford, Stephens, Sterling, Stonewall, Sutton, Terry, Throckmorton, Tom Green, Upton, Ward, Wilbarger. Portions of Taylor. |
| 87 | Charles Perry | All of Baylor, Borden, Childress, Coke, Coleman, Concho, Cottle, Crane, Crosby, Dawson, Dickens, Eastland, Fisher, Floyd, Foard, Garza, Hale, Hardeman, Haskell, Hockley, Irion, Jones, Kent, Kimble, King, Knox, Lamb, Lubbock, Lynn, Mason, McCulloch, Menard, Mitchell, Motley, Nolan, Reagan, Runnels, Schleicher, Scurry, Shackelford, Stephens, Sterling, Stonewall, Sutton, Terry, Throckmorton, Tom Green, Upton, Ward, Wilbarger. Portions of Taylor. |
| 88 | Charles Perry | All of Baylor, Childress, Coleman, Collingsworth, Concho, Cottle, Crosby, Dickens, Donley, Fisher, Floyd, Foard, Garza, Gray, Hale, Hardeman, Haskell, Hockley, Jones, Kent, King, Knox, Lamb, Lubbock, Lynn, Mason, McCulloch, Menard, Mills, Motley, Nolan, Runnels, San Saba, Stonewall, Taylor, Terry, Throckmorton, Tom Green, Wheeler, Wilbarger. Portions of Wichita. |
| 89 | Charles Perry | All of Baylor, Childress, Coleman, Collingsworth, Concho, Cottle, Crosby, Dickens, Donley, Fisher, Floyd, Foard, Garza, Gray, Hale, Hardeman, Haskell, Hockley, Jones, Kent, King, Knox, Lamb, Lubbock, Lynn, Mason, McCulloch, Menard, Mills, Motley, Nolan, Runnels, San Saba, Stonewall, Taylor, Terry, Throckmorton, Tom Green, Wheeler, Wilbarger. Portions of Wichita. |
