= Texas's 16th Senate district =

American legislative district

Texas's 16th State Senate district
Senator
Nathan Johnson; D–Dallas
- Demographics: 44.6% White; 13.1% Black; 29.3% Hispanic; 12.7% Asian
- Population: 898,224

District 16 of the Texas Senate is a senatorial district that currently serves a portion of Dallas county in the U.S. state of Texas.

The current senator from District 16 is Nathan M. Johnson.

== Biggest cities in the district ==
District 16 has a population of 816,670 with 614,614 that is at voting age as of the 2010 census.

	Name	County	Pop. (Note: Population is based on the number of people in the district in that city, not the overall population of that city)
1	Dallas	Dallas	350,201
2	Garland	Dallas	134,462
3	Irving	Dallas	121,029
4	Carrollton	Dallas	49,352
5	Rowlett	Dallas	49,188

== Election history ==
Election history of District 25 from 1992. (Note: Uncontested primary elections are not shown.)

=== 2024 ===
Texas general election, 2024: Senate District 16
Party	Candidate	Votes	%	±%
Democratic	Nathan M. Johnson (Incumbent)	187,557	100.00	+38.05
Majority		187,557	100.00	+76.10
Turnout		187,557		
Democratic hold				

=== 2022 ===
Texas general election, 2022: Senate District 16
Party	Candidate	Votes	%	±%
Democratic	Nathan Johnson (Incumbent)	118,663	61.95	+7.82
Republican	Brandon Copeland	72,885	38.05	−7.82
Majority		45,778	23.90	+15.62
Turnout		191,548		
Democratic hold				

=== 2018 ===
Texas general election, 2018: Senate District 16
Party	Candidate	Votes	%	±%
Democratic	Nathan Johnson	159,288	54.13	+54.13
Republican	Don Huffines (Incumbent)	134,933	45.87	−54.13
Majority		24,355	8.28	−91.72
Turnout		294,161		
Democratic gain from Republican				

=== 2014 ===
Texas general election, 2014: Senate District 16
Party	Candidate	Votes	%	±%
Republican	Don Huffines	106,546	100.00	+0.00
Majority		106,546	100.00	+0.00
Turnout		106,546		
Republican hold				

=== 2012 ===
Texas general election, 2012: Senate District 16
Party	Candidate	Votes	%	±%
Republican	John Carona (Incumbent)	181,746	100.00	+43.75
Majority		181,746	100.00	+84.81
Turnout		181,746		
Republican hold				

=== 2008 ===
Texas general election, 2008: Senate District 16
Party	Candidate	Votes	%	±%
Republican	John Carona (Incumbent)	121,928	56.25	−43.75
Democratic	Rain Levy Minns	89,000	41.06	+41.06
Libertarian	Paul E. Osborn	5,806	2.67	+2.67
Majority		32,928	15.19	−84.81
Turnout		216,734		
Republican hold				

=== 2004 ===
Texas general election, 2004: Senate District 16
Party	Candidate	Votes	%	±%
Republican	John Carona (Incumbent)	142,542	100.00	+35.93
Majority		142,542	100.00	+69.95
Turnout		142,542		−4.72
Republican hold				

=== 2002 ===
Texas general election, 2002: Senate District 16
Party	Candidate	Votes	%	±%
Republican	John Carona (Incumbent)	95,853	67.07	−35.93
Democratic	Jan Erik Frederiksen	50,895	34.02	+34.02
Libertarian	Jack Thompson	2,857	1.91	+1.91
Majority		44,958	30.05	−69.95
Turnout		149,605		+85.15
Republican hold				

=== 1998 ===
Texas general election, 1998: Senate District 16
Party	Candidate	Votes	%	±%
Republican	John Carona (Incumbent)	80,802	100.00	
Majority		80,802	100.00	
Turnout		80,802		
Republican hold				

=== 1996 (special) ===
Texas Senate District 16 special runoff election - 1 June 1996
Party	Candidate	Votes	%	±%
Republican	John Carona	10,459	57.04	+17.19
Republican	Donna Halstead	7,876	42.96	+11.55
Majority		2,583	14.09	
Turnout		18,335		
Republican hold				

Texas Senate District 16 special election - 4 May 1996
Party	Candidate	Votes	%
Republican	John Carona	9,357	39.85
Republican	Donna Halstead	7,375	31.41
Democratic	Jan Erik Frederiksen	3,295	14.03
Republican	Steve Matthews	3,174	13.52
Republican	Bob White	282	1.20
Turnout		23,483	

=== 1994 ===
Texas general election, 1994: Senate District 16
Party	Candidate	Votes	%	±%
Republican	John N. Leedom (Incumbent)	108,229	87.10	+6.25
Libertarian	Randal Morgan	15,959	12.84	−6.31
Write-In	Henry Gail Norrid	67	0.05	
Majority		92,270	74.26	+12.56
Turnout		124,255		−30.67
Republican hold				

=== 1992 ===
Texas general election, 1992: Senate District 16
Party	Candidate	Votes	%	±%
Republican	John N. Leedom (Incumbent)	144,908	80.85	
Libertarian	Randal Morgan	34,325	19.15	
Majority		110,583	61.70	
Turnout		179,233		
Republican hold				

== District officeholders ==
Legislature	Senator, District 16	Counties in District
1	Robert McAlpin Williamson	Milam, Washington.
2	Robert McAlpin Williamson	Milam, Washington.
3	Edward Burleson	Bastrop, Caldwell, Fayette, Hays, Travis.
4	William S. Day	Austin, Fort Bend, Washington.
5	Henry C. Pedigo	Jefferson, Liberty, Orange, Polk, Trinity, Tyler.
6	Henry C. Pedigo	Jefferson, Liberty, Orange, Polk, Trinity, Tyler.
7	Henry C. Pedigo	Jefferson, Liberty, Orange, Polk, Trinity, Tyler.
8	Enoch S. Pitts	Jefferson, Liberty, Orange, Polk, Trinity, Tyler.
9	A. N. Jordan	Brazoria, Fort Bend, Harris.
10	A. N. Jordan	Brazoria, Fort Bend, Harris.
11	Abram Morris Gentry	Brazoria, Fort Bend, Harris.
12	Matthew Gaines	Washington.
13	Matthew Gaines	Washington.
14	Seth Shepard; T. G. Davidson	Burleson, Washington.
15	Tillman Smith; James R. Burnett	Grimes, Madison, Trinity, Walker.
16	James R. Burnett; John T. Buchanan	Grimes, Madison, Trinity, Walker.
17	John T. Buchanan; James G. McDonald	Grimes, Madison, Trinity, Walker.
18	Barnett Gibbs	Dallas, Kaufman, Rockwall.
19	J. O. Terrell	Dallas, Kaufman, Rockwall.
20	J. O. Terrell	Dallas, Kaufman, Rockwall.
21	Robert S. Kimbrough	Dallas, Kaufman, Rockwall.
22	Robert S. Kimbrough	Dallas, Kaufman, Rockwall.
23	James H. Shelburne	Austin, Fort Bend, Harris, Waller.
24	James H. Shelburne	Austin, Fort Bend, Harris, Waller.
25	Waller T. Burns	Austin, Fort Bend, Harris, Waller.
26	Waller T. Burns	Austin, Fort Bend, Harris, Waller.
27	Abner G. Lipscomb	Austin, Fort Bend, Harris, Waller.
28	Abner G. Lipscomb	Fort Bend, Harris, Waller.
29	George B. Griggs	Fort Bend, Harris, Waller.
30	George B. Griggs	Fort Bend, Harris, Waller.
31	Francis Charles Hume, Jr.	Fort Bend, Harris, Waller.
32	Francis Charles Hume, Jr.	Fort Bend, Harris, Waller.
33	Louis H. Bailey	Fort Bend, Harris, Waller.
34	Louis H. Bailey	Fort Bend, Harris, Waller.
35	Rienzi Melville Johnston	Fort Bend, Harris, Waller.
36	Rienzi Melville Johnston; Lynch Davidson	Fort Bend, Harris, Waller.
37	Charles A. Murphy	Fort Bend, Harris, Waller.
38	Charles A. Murphy	Fort Bend, Harris, Waller.
39	Charles A. Murphy	Harris.
40	James W. Hall; Walter Frank Woodul	Harris.
41	Walter Frank Woodul	Harris.
42	Walter Frank Woodul	Harris.
43	Walter Frank Woodul	Harris.
44	Weaver Moore	Harris.
45	Weaver Moore	Harris.
46	Weaver Moore	Harris.
47	Weaver Moore	Harris.
48	Weaver Moore	Harris.
49	Weaver Moore	Harris.
50	W. Lacy Stewart; Maribelle Stewart	Harris.
51	J. Searcy Bracewell, Jr.	Harris.
52	J. Searcy Bracewell, Jr.	Harris.
53	Carlos C. Ashley, Sr.	Bandera, Brown, Burnet, Concho, Gillespie, Kerr, Kimble, Kinney, Lampasas, Llano, Mason, McCulloch, Menard, Mills, Real, San Saba, Uvalde, Zavala.
54	Carlos C. Ashley, Sr.	Bandera, Brown, Burnet, Concho, Gillespie, Kerr, Kimble, Kinney, Lampasas, Llano, Mason, McCulloch, Menard, Mills, Real, San Saba, Uvalde, Zavala.
55	Carlos C. Ashley, Sr.	Bandera, Brown, Burnet, Concho, Gillespie, Kerr, Kimble, Kinney, Lampasas, Llano, Mason, McCulloch, Menard, Mills, Real, San Saba, Uvalde, Zavala.
56	Louis Crump	Bandera, Brown, Burnet, Concho, Gillespie, Kerr, Kimble, Kinney, Lampasas, Llano, Mason, McCulloch, Menard, Mills, Real, San Saba, Uvalde, Zavala.
57	Louis Crump	Bandera, Brown, Burnet, Concho, Gillespie, Kerr, Kimble, Kinney, Lampasas, Llano, Mason, McCulloch, Menard, Mills, Real, San Saba, Uvalde, Zavala.
58	Louis Crump	Bandera, Brown, Burnet, Concho, Gillespie, Kerr, Kimble, Kinney, Lampasas, Llano, Mason, McCulloch, Menard, Mills, Real, San Saba, Uvalde, Zavala.
59	Louis Crump	Bandera, Brown, Burnet, Concho, Gillespie, Kerr, Kimble, Kinney, Lampasas, Llano, Mason, McCulloch, Menard, Mills, Real, San Saba, Uvalde, Zavala.
60	Jim Wade	Portion of Dallas.
61	Mike McKool	Portion of Dallas.
62	Mike McKool	Portion of Dallas.
63	Bill Braecklein	Portion of Dallas.
64	Bill Braecklein	Portion of Dallas.
65	Bill Braecklein	Portion of Dallas.
66	Bill Braecklein	Portion of Dallas.
67	John N. Leedom	Portion of Dallas.
68	John N. Leedom	Portion of Dallas.
69	John N. Leedom	Portion of Dallas.
70	John N. Leedom	Portion of Dallas.
71	John N. Leedom	Portion of Dallas.
72	John N. Leedom	Portion of Dallas.
73	John N. Leedom	Portion of Dallas.
74	John N. Leedom; John J. Carona	Portions of Dallas, Rockwall.
75	John J. Carona	Portions of Dallas, Rockwall.
76	John J. Carona	Portions of Dallas, Rockwall.
77	John J. Carona	Portions of Dallas, Rockwall.
78	John J. Carona	Portion of Dallas.
79	John J. Carona	Portion of Dallas.
80	John J. Carona	Portion of Dallas.
81	John J. Carona	Portion of Dallas.
82	John J. Carona	Portion of Dallas.
83	John J. Carona	Portion of Dallas.
84	Don Huffines	Portion of Dallas.
85	Don Huffines	Portion of Dallas.
86	Nathan M. Johnson	Portion of Dallas.
87	Nathan M. Johnson	Portion of Dallas.
88	Nathan M. Johnson	Portion of Dallas.
89	Nathan M. Johnson	Portion of Dallas.
