= 2026 Texas Comptroller of Public Accounts election =

- November 3, 2026

Nominee	Sarah Eckhardt	Don Huffines
Party	Democratic	Republican
Popular vote	5,016,329	4,512,804
Percentage	51.30%	46.15%
- County results Eckhardt: 40–50% 50–60% 60–70% 70–80% Huffines: 40–50% 50–60% 60–70% 70–80% 80–90% ≥90%
Comptroller before election
Don Huffines
(acting)
Republican
Elected Comptroller
Sarah Eckhardt
Democratic

The 2026 Texas Comptroller of Public Accounts election took on November 3, 2026, to select the next Texas Comptroller of Public Accounts. Incumbent Republican Comptroller Glenn Hegar was elected to a third term with 56.4% of the vote in 2022; he resigned on July 1, 2025, to become chancellor of the Texas A&M University System and was succeeded by his chief clerk Kelly Hancock as acting Comptroller.

Hancock ran for a full term, but lost the primary to former state senator Don Huffines. Not long after losing the primary, Hancock announced that he would also resign from the office. Governor Greg Abbott then appointed Huffines to serve out the remainder of the term as acting Comproller.

Huffines faced the Democratic nominee state senator Sarah Eckhardt in the general election. Eckhardt won the election becoming the first Democrat to win the office since 1994.

== Republican primary ==
=== Background ===
In March 2025, it was announced that Glenn Hegar would resign to become chancellor of the Texas A&M University System. Railroad Commissioner Christi Craddick and former State Senator Don Huffines announced their candidacy. In July 2025, Governor Greg Abbott appointed Kelly Hancock to serve as acting Comptroller until the election. Hancock had been serving as a State Senator from District 9, but resigned prior to his appointment to become chief clerk of the Comptroller's office in order to get around state law barring the Governor's appointment of legislators during their terms.

=== Candidates ===
==== Nominee ====
- Don Huffines, former state senator from the 16th district (2015–2019) and candidate for governor in 2022

==== Eliminated in primary ====
- Michael Berlanga, candidate for Texas House of Representatives in 2018
- Christi Craddick, member of the Texas Railroad Commission (2012–present) and daughter of former state house speaker Tom Craddick
- Kelly Hancock, acting comptroller (2025–2026) and former state senator from the 9th district (2013–2025)

=== Endorsements ===
Michael Berlanga

Newspapers

- Austin American-Statesman
- Houston Chronicle
- San Antonio Express-News
Christi Craddick

State legislators

- Tom Craddick, former speaker of the Texas House of Representatives (2003–2009) from the 82nd district (1969–present) (candidate's father)

Individuals

- G. Brint Ryan, tax consultant
- Kelcy Warren, CEO of Energy Transfer
Kelly Hancock

Statewide officials

- Greg Abbott, governor of Texas (2015–present)
- Glenn Hegar, former state comptroller (2015–2025) and chancellor of the Texas A&M University System (2025–present)

Labor unions

- Combined Law Enforcement Associations of Texas

Newspapers

- Dallas Morning News
- Fort Worth Star-Telegram
Don Huffines

Executive branch officials

- Donald Trump, president of the United States (2017–2021, 2025–present)

U.S. senators

- Ted Cruz, Texas (2013–present)

U.S. representatives

- Matt Gaetz, former FL-01 (2017–2024)
- Brandon Gill, TX-26 (2025–present)
- Wesley Hunt, TX-38 (2023–present)
- Ronny Jackson, TX-13 (2021–present)
- Ron Paul, former TX-22 (1976–1977, 1979–1985) and TX-14 (1997–2013)
- Chip Roy, TX-21 (2019–present)
- Keith Self, TX-03 (2023–present)

State legislators

- Matt Rinaldi, former state representative from the 115th district (2015–2019) and chair of the Texas Republican Party (2021–2024)

Individuals

- Rafael Cruz, pastor and father of U.S. Senator Ted Cruz
- Riley Gaines, swimmer and conservative activist
- Charlie Kirk, founder of Turning Point USA (deceased)
- Jim McIngvale, businessman
- Chad Prather, political commentator and comedian
- Vivek Ramaswamy, entrepreneur

Organizations

- Gun Owners of America Texas
- Republicans for National Renewal
- Texas Eagle Forum
- Texas Gun Rights
- Texas Right to Life PAC
- Young Conservatives of Texas

=== Polling ===
Poll source	Date(s) administered	Sample size (Note: Key: A – all adults RV – registered voters LV – likely voters V – unclear)	Margin of error	Christi Craddick	Kelly Hancock	Don Huffines	Other	Undecided
University of Houston/YouGov	January 20–31, 2026	550 (LV)	± 4.2%	21%	13%	33%	4% (Note: Michael Berlanga with 4%)	29%
Texas Southern University	August 6–12, 2025	1,500 (LV)	± 2.5%	22%	10%	21%	–	47%

=== Results ===
Results by county Huffines: 20–30%; 30–40%; 40–50%; 50–60%; 60–70%; Hancock: 30–40%; 40–50%; Craddick: 30–40%

Republican primary
Party	Candidate	Votes	%
Republican	Don Huffines	1,191,151	57.4
Republican	Kelly Hancock (incumbent)	490,933	23.7
Republican	Christi Craddick	312,314	15.1
Republican	Michael Berlanga	80,949	3.9
Total votes		2,075,347	100.0

== Democratic primary ==
=== Background ===
Following the announcement that longtime U.S. Representative Michael McCaul was retiring from Congress, state senator Sarah Eckhardt announced her intention to run for the position. On the candidate filing deadline, Eckhardt announced that she was instead going to run for Comptroller.

=== Candidates ===
==== Nominee ====
- Sarah Eckhardt, state senator from the 14th district (2020–present)

==== Eliminated in primary ====
- Michael Lange, candidate for Texas Land Commissioner in 2022
- Savant Moore, entrepreneur

=== Endorsements ===
Sarah Eckhardt

Labor unions

- Texas AFL-CIO

Organizations

- Houston LGBTQ+ Political Caucus

Newspapers

- Austin American-Statesman
- Dallas Morning News
- Fort Worth Star-Telegram
- Houston Chronicle
- San Antonio Express-News
- The Austin Chronicle

=== Results ===
Results by county Eckhardt: 40–50%; 50–60%; 60–70%; 70–80%; 80–90%; 90–100%; Moore: 60–70%; Lange: 30–40%; 50–60%; 90–100%

Democratic primary
Party	Candidate	Votes	%
Democratic	Sarah Eckhardt	1,317,024	64.1
Democratic	Savant Moore	392,043	19.1
Democratic	Michael Lange	346,484	16.9
Total votes		2,055,551	100.0

== Third party conventions ==
=== Candidates ===
==== Nominees ====
- V. Alonzo Echavarria-Garza (Libertarian), Hearne city manager and nominee in 2022
- Shehla Faizi (Green), podcaster

== General election ==
The March 3 primaries resulted in Don Huffines and Sarah Eckhardt winning their respective primaries by wide margins.

On July 1, 2026 acting comptroller Hancock announced that he would be resigning from his office at the end of the month. The next day Governor Abbott announced that he would be appointing Huffines to serve out the remainder of Hancock's term.

When Huffines took office he initiaited a controlversial reorganization of the of the department, including the termination of 41 employees and hiring of a political strategist as deputy comptroller. The Dallas Morning News also reported that Huffines had initiated a $3,000,000 renovation of the comptroller's executive suite using the agency's safekeeping trust, drawing criticism from opponents.

Huffines campaigned on instituting DOGE-like reforms to state agencies and ending regulations that he claimed were unfairly burdening businesses and taxpayers. To this end, soon into his tenure he initiated a series of so called "executive orders" aimed at targeting "woke DEI" contracts, auditing school districts, and eliminating "hidden" taxes.

Eckhardt campaigned on returning political independence to the office which she argued had in recent years become mired by partisan ideologies. She also critiqued the Huffines administration's rule changes and restructuring as disruptive.

=== Post-primary endorsements ===
Sarah Eckhardt (D)

Newspapers

- Austin American-Statesman
- The Dallas Morning News
- Houston Chronicle
- San Antonio Express-News

=== Fundraising ===
Campaign finance reports as of October 24, 2026
Candidate	Raised	Spent	Cash on hand
Don Huffines (R)	$8,374,073	$7,114,238	$2,276,031
Sarah Eckhardt (D)	$1,222,200	$981,165	$308,669
Alonzo Echavarria-Garza (L)	$394	$0	$0
Shehla Faizi (G)	$10,610	$6,048	$3,976
Source: Texas Ethics Commission

=== Polling ===
Poll source	Date(s) administered	Sample size	Margin of error	Don Huffines (R)	Sarah Eckhardt (D)	Other	Undecided
Texas Southern University	October 21–25, 2026	2,000 (LV)	± 2.2%	50%	44%	1% (Note: Alonzo Echavarria-Garza (L) with 1%; Shela Faizi (G) with 0%)	5%
Texas Public Opinion Research	October 15–18, 2026	969 (LV)	± 3.9%	50%	48%	2% (Note: Alonzo Echavarria-Garza (L) with 2%; Shela Faizi (G) with 0%)	–
University of Houston	October 10–14, 2026	2,000 (LV)	± 2.2%	47%	40%	2% (Note: Alonzo Echavarria-Garza (L) with 2%; Shela Faizi (G) with 0%)	11%
University of Texas/Texas Politics Project	September 25 – October 5, 2026	861 (LV)	± 3.3%	47%	46%	5% (Note: V. Alonzo Echavarria Garza (L) with 2%; Shehla Faizi (G) with 1%; "Someone else" with 2%)	—
Stratus Intelligence (R)	September 22–24, 2026	865 (LV)	± 3.5%	49%	43%	—	8%
Texas Public Opinion Research	September 19–22, 2026	1,007 (LV)	± 3.6%	46%	43%	4% (Note: "Would not vote" with 2%; V. Alonzo Echavarria-Garza (L) with 1%; Shela Faizi (G) with 1%)	7%
Texas Southern University	September 15–19, 2026	1,800 (LV)	± 2.3%	47%	39%	3% (Note: V. Alonzo Echavarria-Garza (L) with 2%; Shela Faizi (G) with 1%)	11%
Texas Public Opinion Research	August 21–24, 2026	1,000 (LV)	± 3.3%	43% (Note: With voters who lean towards a given candidate)	41%	4% (Note: "Would not vote in that race" with 3%; Alonzo Echavarria-Garza (L) with 1%)	11%
University of Texas/Texas Politics Project	August 5–13, 2026	1,200 (RV)	± 2.83%	41%	34%	4% (Note: V. Alonzo Echavarria-Garza (L) with 2%; Shehla Faizi (G) with 1%; Someone else with 1%)	21%
Texas Southern University	July 27–30, 2026	1,200 (LV)	± 2.8%	46%	39%	2% (Note: Alonzo Echavarria-Garza (L) with 2%)	13%
University of Texas/YouGov	June 5–12, 2026	1,200 (RV)	± 3.47%	40%	34%	4% (Note: "Someone else" with 2%; Alonzo Echavarria-Garza (L) & Shehla Faizi (G) with 1%)	21%

=== Results ===
2026 Texas Comptroller of Public Accounts election
Party	Candidate	Votes	%	±%
Democratic	Sarah Eckhardt	5,016,329	51.3	
Republican	Don Huffines (incumbent)	4,512,804	46.2	
Libertarian	V. Alonzo Echavarria-Garza	185,258	1.9	
Green	Shehla Faizi	63,892	0.7	
Total votes		9,778,283	100.0%	
Democratic gain from Republican				

== Aftermath ==
Following the election, Eckhardt requested that Huffines pause further regulatory rule changes and agency reorganization till she is sworn into office in January in order to smooth the transition of power. Huffines refused the request and has continued to issue new regulatory changes. Eckhardt has also stated that she will request Governor Abbott to appoint her to the office early if Huffines won't cooperate.
