= 68th Texas Legislature =

The 68th Texas Legislature met in regular session from January 11, 1983, to May 30, 1983, and in two subsequent special called sessions (see below). All members present during this session were elected in the 1982 general elections.

== Sessions ==
Regular Session: January 11, 1983 - May 30, 1983
1st Called Session: June 22, 1983 - June 25, 1983
2nd Called Session: June 4, 1984 - July 3, 1984

== Party summary ==
=== Senate ===
Affiliation	Members	Note
Democratic Party	26	
Republican Party	5	
Total	31	

=== House ===
Affiliation	Members	Note
Democratic Party	113	
Republican Party	37	
Total	150	

== Officers ==
=== Senate ===
- Lieutenant Governor: William P. Hobby, Jr., Democrat
- President Pro Tempore (regular session): J. Grant Jones, Democrat
- President Pro Tempore (1st called session): Lloyd Doggett, Democrat
- President Pro Tempore (2nd called session): Lindon Williams, Democrat

=== House ===
- Speaker of the House: Gibson D. "Gib" Lewis, Democrat

== Members ==
=== Senate ===
Dist. 1

- Ed Howard (D), Texarkana

Dist. 2

- Ted Lyon (D), Rockwall

Dist. 3

- Don Adams (D), Jasper

Dist. 4

- Carl A. Parker (D), Port Arthur

Dist. 5

- Kent A. Caperton (D), Bryan

Dist. 6

- Lindon Williams (D), Houston

Dist. 7

- Don Henderson (R), Houston

Dist. 8

- O.H. "Ike" Harris (R), Dallas

Dist. 9

- Chet Edwards (D), Duncanville

Dist. 10

- Bob McFarland (R), Arlington

Dist. 11

- Chet Brooks (D), Houston

Dist. 12

- Hugh Q. Parmer (D), Fort Worth

Dist. 13

- Craig Washington (D), Houston

Dist. 14

- Lloyd Doggett (D), Austin

Dist. 15

- John Whitmire (D), Houston

Dist. 16

- John N. Leedom (R), Dallas

Dist. 17

- J. E. "Buster" Brown (R), Galveston

Dist. 18

- John Sharp (D), Victoria

Dist. 19

- Glenn Kothmann (D), San Antonio

Dist. 20

- Carlos F. Truan (D), Corpus Christi

Dist. 21

- John Traeger (D), Seguin

Dist. 22

- Bob Glasgow (D), Stephenville

Dist. 23

- Oscar Mauzy (D), Dallas

Dist. 24

- Grant Jones (D), Abilene

Dist. 25

- Bill Sims (D), San Angelo

Dist. 26

- R.L. "Bob" Vale (D), San Antonio

Dist. 27

- Raul Longoria (D), Edinburg

Dist. 28

- John T. Montford (D), Lubbock

Dist. 29

- Tati Santiesteban (D), El Paso

Dist. 30

- Ray Farabee (D), Wichita Falls

Dist. 31

- Bill Sarpalius (D), Amarillo
