= Taylor Rehmet =

American politician (born 1992)

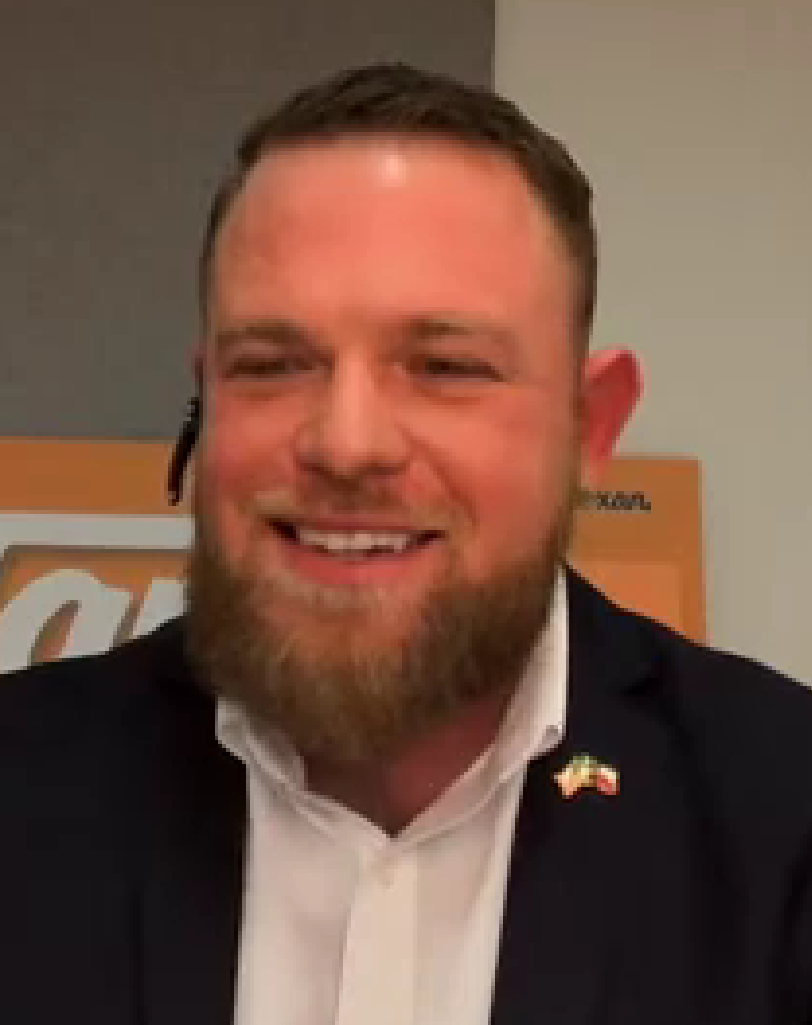
- Rehmet in 2026

Member of the Texas Senate from the 9th district
- Incumbent
- Assumed office February 19, 2026
- Preceded by: Kelly Hancock

Personal details
- Born: July 17, 1992 (age 34) Garland, Texas, U.S.
- Party: Democratic
- Occupation: Aircraft mechanic
- Website: Campaign website

Military service
- Branch/service: United States Air Force

Taylor Rehmet (born July 17, 1992) is an American politician, union leader, and aircraft mechanic elected in 2026 to represent the 9th district in the Texas Senate. A member of the Democratic Party, Rehmet gained national attention after he won the runoff election held on January 31, 2026, by 14.4%. The district, which Republican Donald Trump won by 17 points in 2024, had not been represented by a Democrat since 1991. Rehmet was re-elected in the 2026 general election.

== Early life and career ==
Rehmet was born in Garland, Texas. His father worked as an airline mechanic and his mother worked in a salon. Rehmet stated that he grew up Republican. At the age of 19, he joined the United States Air Force and served as an electrical and environmental systems specialist in Minot, North Dakota.

After four years of active duty, he left the Air Force and joined Lockheed Martin as an aircraft mechanic in Fort Worth, Texas, in 2017. He serves as president of his local and state chapter of the International Association of Machinists and Aerospace Workers.

== Texas Senate ==
After Republican Kelly Hancock resigned from the Texas Senate to become the acting Texas comptroller, Rehmet ran for the vacant seat to fill his term ending January 2027. In the November 5, 2025, special election, Rehmet placed first with 47.6% of the vote ahead of Republicans Leigh Wambsganss and John Huffman. Rehmet and Wambsganss advanced to a runoff on January 31, 2026, where Rehmet won by over 14% of the vote.

Media noted that the district was reliably Republican and that Donald Trump had won the district by 17 points in the 2024 presidential election, making Rehmet's victory an upset. Going into the January runoff election he spent $70,000, and Wambsganss reported $736,000 in expenditure. He received $500,000 in independent expenditures from VoteVets and $143,383 in donations from the Texas Democratic Party's Texas Majority PAC.

He was sworn into office on February 19, 2026.

== Electoral history ==
2025–26 Texas's 9th Senate district special election
| Party | Candidate | Votes | % |
|---|---|---|---|
| Democratic | Taylor Rehmet | 56,565 | 47.57% |
| Republican | Leigh Wambsganss | 42,739 | 35.94% |
| Republican | John Huffman | 19,608 | 16.49% |
| Total votes | | 118,912 | 100.0 |
Runoff election
| Democratic | Taylor Rehmet | 54,473 | 57.27% |
| Republican | Leigh Wambsganss | 40,648 | 42.73% |
| Total votes | | 95,121 | 100.0 |
| Democratic gain from Republican | | | |
