= Don Huffines =

American politician

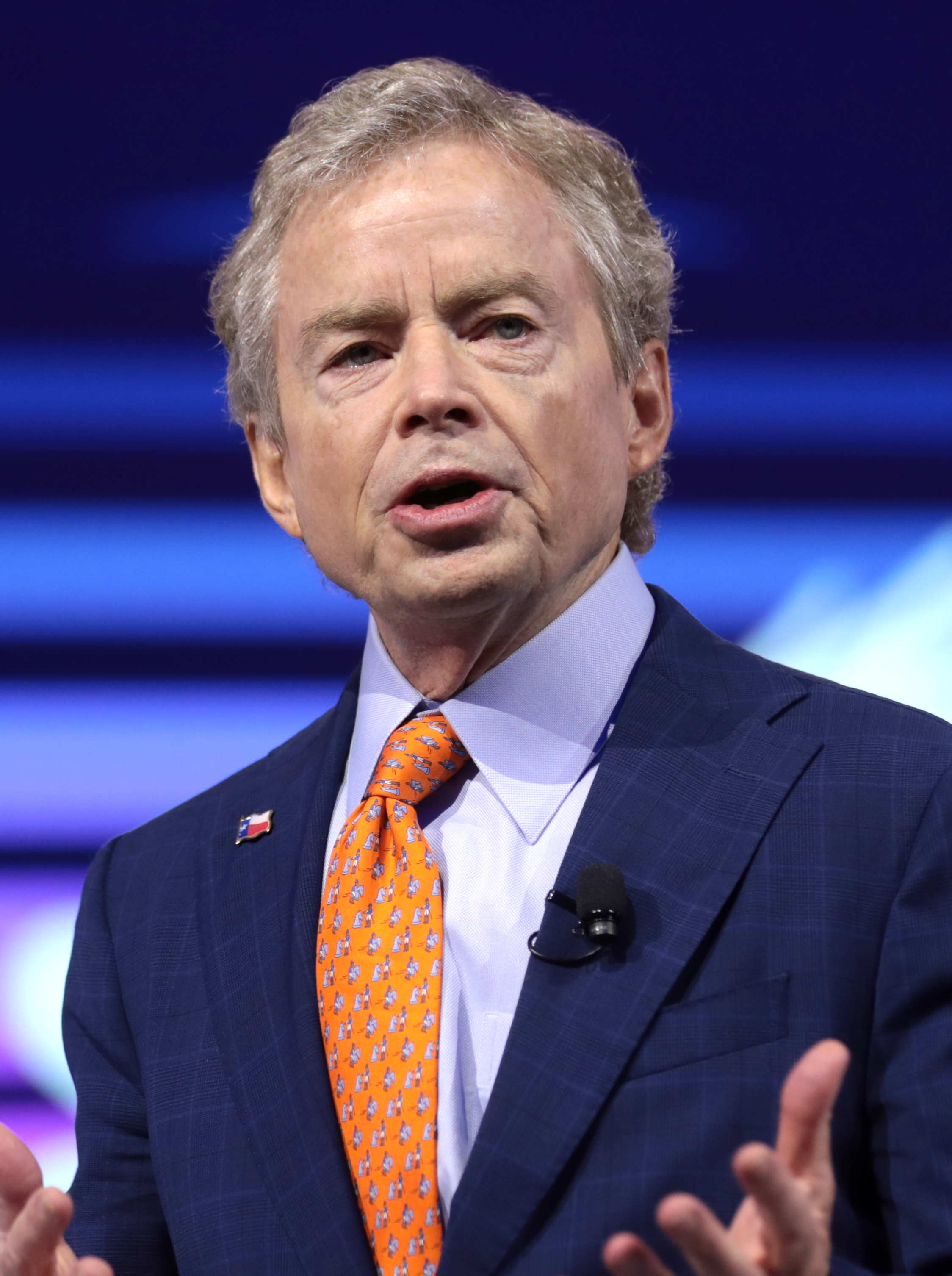
- Huffines in 2021

40th Comptroller of Texas
- Incumbent
- Assumed office August 1, 2026
- Governor: Greg Abbott
- Preceded by: Kelly Hancock (acting)

Member of the Texas Senate from the 16th district
- In office January 13, 2015 – January 8, 2019
- Preceded by: John Carona
- Succeeded by: Nathan M. Johnson

Personal details
- Born: Donald Blaine Huffines; April 26, 1958 (age 68) Dallas, Texas, U.S.
- Party: Republican
- Spouse: Mary Huffines
- Children: 6
- Education: University of Texas, Austin (BBA)
- Website: Campaign website

Donald Blaine Huffines (born April 26, 1958) is an American politician and businessman serving as the Texas Comptroller of Public Accounts since 2026. A member of the Republican Party, he served in the Texas Senate from 2015 to 2019.

Huffines ran for governor of Texas in the 2022 Republican primary, unsuccessfully challenging incumbent Greg Abbott, following the COVID-19 pandemic and lockdowns.

On March 7, 2025, Huffines announced his candidacy for Texas comptroller. He won the Republican primary for the office on March 3, 2026, defeating the incumbent Kelly Hancock. Not long after losing the primary, Hancock announced that he would resign and on July 2, 2026, Abbott announced that he would be appointing Huffines to serve out the remainder of the term. Huffines ran for a full term in the 2026 Texas Comptroller of Public Accounts election and lost to Democrat Sarah Eckhardt.

== Early life and education ==
Don Huffines is a fifth-generation Texan, born in Dallas on April 26, 1958. He has two older brothers, James and Ray, and an identical twin brother, Phillip. In his childhood, he and his brothers helped out at their grandfather's car dealership. Don Huffines' grandfather, James Lecil "J.L." Huffines, started the Huffines Motor Company in Denton, Texas, in 1924. The company has since grown into a large network of metroplex dealerships run by Don's brother, Ray Huffines.

Huffines graduated from the University of Texas at Austin with a Bachelor of Business Administration in finance.

== Real-estate career ==
Huffines and his twin brother Phillip are the co-founders and current owners of Huffines Communities, a Dallas/Fort Worth real-estate company they established in 1985. Huffines is also the president and founder of Huffines Enterprises.

In 2022, he founded the Huffines Liberty Foundation, a Texas think-tank proposing fiscally conservative public policies. Huffines has published numerous op-eds with the Foundation in the Houston Chronicle and Dallas Morning News about property taxes.

== State politics ==
=== Texas Senate ===
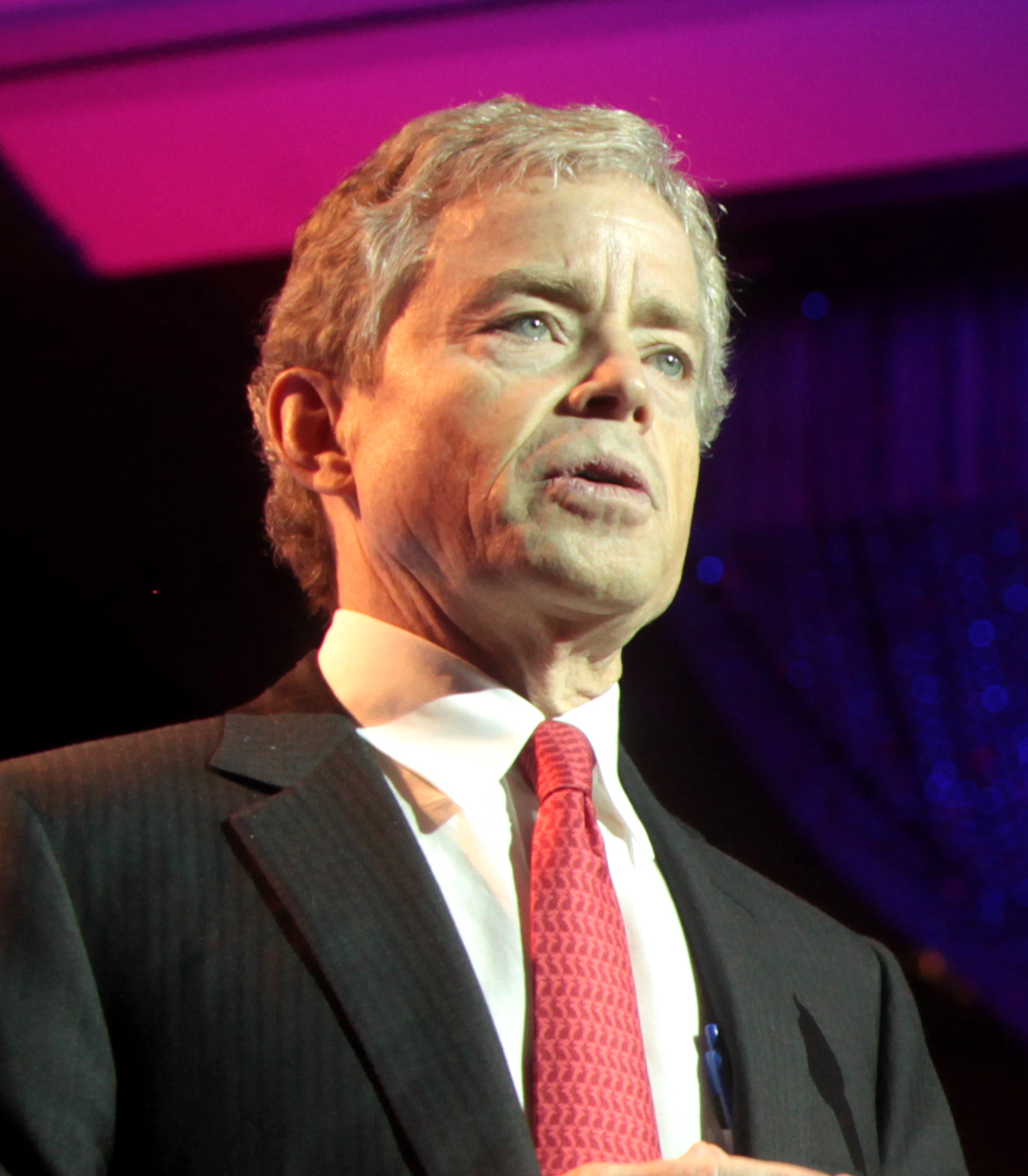
Huffines in 2014

In 2014, Huffines ran for a seat in the Texas State Senate. He challenged the incumbent of district 16, Senator John J. Carona, in the Republican primary. Huffines' campaign claimed that Carona was not a true conservative; Huffines ultimately won the primary against Carona on March 4, 2014. A combined total of $6.3 million was spent by both candidates in the primary race.

In the November 4 general election, Huffines ran unopposed. Huffines campaigned on the themes of term limits, school choice, funding highway construction, opposing new toll roads, cutting taxes, and teaching creationism in public schools.

==== Tenure ====
During his time in office, Huffines authored many bills addressing Republican priorities and consistently voted along his party line on conservative legislation.

A Rice University Baker Institute study by political science fellow Mark Jones named Huffines the fourth-most conservative member of the 2017 Texas Senate. He scored 97% on the Texans for Fiscal Responsibility Index the same year. Huffines received a 92% career rating from Young Conservatives of Texas. Huffines was also recognized as a "Faith & Family" champion by Texas Values Action, with a score of 98%.

Huffines served as vice-chair of the Texas Senate Border Security, Veteran Affairs, and Transportation committees. He also served as a member of the Education, Business & Commerce, Intergovernmental Regulations, and Natural Resources & Economic Development committees.

In 2017, Huffines got a bipartisan bill to end Texas state vehicle inspections approved in the Texas Senate. In passing the legislation, Huffines was joined by his Republican colleagues and seven Democrats. The Texas Tribune claimed that if Huffines' bill were to become law, it would eliminate the state's vehicle safety inspection requirement for most vehicles and save about $140 million per year statewide. The bill then failed in the Texas House, without a vote on the floor. A similar bill passed in 2023, 4 years after he left office.

Huffines also proposed a bill in 2017 that would have required 30% voter turnout for any bond approval vote in Texas to be successful. At the time, most of these elections drew fewer than 10% of voters to the polls.

Huffines is also known for advocating the elimination of those Dallas County Schools that mismanaged taxpayer money. Six people were imprisoned after being exposed for their roles in a multi-million dollar scam, with assistance by the FBI.

On November 6, 2018, Huffines lost his re-election bid to Democrat Nathan M. Johnson, who was the first Democrat to win Senate District 16 in over three decades. Huffines received 45.9% of the vote.

=== 2022 gubernatorial campaign ===
Huffines remained politically active after losing his Senate re-election campaign. In July 2021, he was openly critical of Governor Greg Abbott's response to the COVID-19 pandemic, specifically lockdowns, and was the first former elected official to call for the reopening of the state.

On May 10, 2021, Huffines announced that he would challenge Abbott in the 2022 Republican primary for governor of Texas. As a candidate, Huffines campaigned on closing the Texas border with Mexico; exposing voter fraud; eliminating property taxes; and illegalizing abortion. The Don Huffines Campaign had 12 field offices across the state, over 70 people on payroll, and raised over $20 million.

In a widely circulated video on Twitter, Huffines accused Abbott of using tax dollars to "promote transgender sexual policies to Texas youth". Huffines criticized the Department of Family Protective Services (DFPS) website, a state agency overseen by Governor Abbott, pointing out it encourages children to "express their identities." This webpage was taken down within minutes of Huffines' initial video. The Huffines campaign claimed credit for the move.

Huffines is noted for pushing Abbott to the right on a variety of issues including vaccine mandates.

Huffines declined to fire a staffer who had previously worked for conspiracy website InfoWars and who had ties to the white nationalist movement; in a statement, Huffines said that he had over 70 people on payroll and that his campaign would not engage in "cancel culture".

On March 1, 2022, Huffines lost the Republican primary, placing third with 12% of the vote against Abbott. In his concession statement, Huffines celebrated "driving the narrative", writing that he forced Governor Abbott to "deliver real conservative victories" on policy such as the Texas Heartbeat Act, Constitutional Carry, and protecting children from "abusive transgender transitioning".

=== Comptroller ===
In March 2025, incumbent comptroller Glenn Hegar announced his intent to resign in order to become chancellor of the Texas A&M University System. On March 7, 2025, Huffines announced his candidacy for comptroller in the 2026 election. If elected, he said, "I will DOGE Texas by exposing waste, fraud, and abuse in government to increase efficiency and put every penny we save into property tax relief."

In the primary election, his opponents were Railroad Commissioner Christi Craddick and acting comptroller Kelly Hancock. Hancock was state senator from district 9, but he resigned to become acting comptroller. Governor Greg Abbott had appointed Hancock and endorsed him, but Huffines "swamped the primary with millions of his own wealth, self-funding his way to a dominant [finish]".

On March 3, 2026, Huffines won the Republican primary with over 57% of the vote. In the November general election, he was to face the Democratic nominee Sarah Eckhardt. At the start of July, Hancock announced that he would be resigning from his position of acting comptroller at the end of the month. The next day Abbott announced that he would be appointing Huffines to the office for the remainder of the term.

Huffines has led a controversial reorganization at the comptroller's office, including the termination of 41 employees and hiring of a political strategist as deputy comptroller.

In September and October 2026, Huffines issued a series of orders directing the office to investigate fluoride in Texas’ municipal water supply, targeting "woke DEI" state contracts, auditing four school districts (Austin ISD, El Paso ISD, Barbers Hill ISD, and Prosper ISD), and banning grant money for Flock cameras. Huffines characterized some of the moves as "executive orders" even though such actions are reserved for the governor.

On October 15, the Dallas Morning News reported that Huffines had initiated a $3,000,000 renovation of the comptroller's executive suite using the agency's safekeeping trust, drawing criticism from opponents.

On election day, Huffines lost to Eckhardt in an upset, returning the office to a Democrat for the first time since 1994. Following the election, Eckhardt requested that Huffines pause further regulatory rule changes and agency reorganization till she is sworn into office in January in order to smooth the transition of power. Huffines refused the request and has continued to issue new regulatory changes. Eckhardt has also stated that she will request Governor Abbott to appoint her to the office early if Huffines won't cooperate.

== Personal life ==
Huffines and his wife of 35 years, Mary Catherine, have five children and ten grandchildren.

On February 16, 2026, the Santa Fe New Mexican confirmed through public records that Huffines is the current owner of Zorro Ranch in New Mexico, a property previously owned by child sex offender Jeffrey Epstein. Four years after Epstein's death, the Huffines family purchased the property, listed at public auction with proceeds to benefit Epstein's victims; they did so through a limited liability company not widely known to be associated with Huffines.

=== Huffines Liberty Foundation ===
In June 2022, Huffines launched the Huffines Liberty Foundation. The stated mission of the Huffines Liberty Foundation is to advance the cause of liberty, prosperity, and virtue in the State of Texas by educating citizens so they may hold their elected officials accountable. The Foundation focuses on "common sense liberty principles" of individual rights, fiscal restraint, personal responsibility, limited government, and fiscal conservatism. The think-tank has released over 15 white papers since October 2022.

During the 88th legislative session in 2023, Huffines actively wrote commentary pieces in the Dallas Morning Newsand Houston Chronicle about the Foundation's plan to eliminate property taxes in Texas.

In June 2023, Governor Greg Abbott called a special session to eliminate property taxes, a priority of both the Don Huffines Campaign and Huffines Liberty Foundation. Democratic Senator Nathan Johnson, who defeated Huffines in 2018, tweeted a photo of Governor Abbott's special session announcement and wrote "STILL don't understand how Don Huffines is running state policy. I beat him (5-1/2 years ago)." Lieutenant Governor Dan Patrick also credited Huffines for continuing to influence state policy on property tax elimination.

== Election history ==
=== 2026 ===
2026 Texas Comptroller of Public Accounts election
Party	Candidate	Votes	%	±%
Democratic	Sarah Eckhardt	5,016,329	51.3	
Republican	Don Huffines (incumbent)	4,512,804	46.2	
Libertarian	V. Alonzo Echavarria-Garza	185,258	1.9	
Green	Shehla Faizi	63,892	0.7	
Total votes		9,778,283	100.0%	
Democratic gain from Republican				

=== 2022 ===
2022 Texas gubernatorial election Republican primary results
Party	Candidate	Votes	%
Republican	Greg Abbott (incumbent)	1,299,059	66.48%
Republican	Allen West	239,557	12.26%
Republican	Don Huffines	234,138	11.98%
Republican	Chad Prather	74,173	3.80%
Republican	Ricky Lynn Perry	61,424	3.14%
Republican	Kandy Kaye Horn	23,605	1.21%
Republican	Paul Belew	11,387	0.58%
Republican	Danny Harrison	10,829	0.55%
Total votes		1,954,172	100%

=== 2018 ===
Texas's 16th State Senate District General Election, 2018
Party	Candidate	Votes	%
Democratic	Nathan Johnson	159,228	54.13
Republican	Don Huffines (incumbent)	134,933	45.87
Total votes		294,161	100.0
Democratic gain from Republican			

=== 2014 ===
Texas Republican primary election, 2014: Senate District 16
Party	Candidate	Votes	%
Republican	Don Huffines	25,141	50.64
Republican	John Carona (incumbent)	24,509	49.36

Texas general election, 2014: Senate District 16
Party	Candidate	Votes	%
Republican	Don Huffines (unopposed)	106,546	100

Party political offices
Preceded by Glenn Hegar	Republican nominee for Comptroller of Texas; 2026	Most recent
Political offices
Preceded by Kelly Hancock	Comptroller of Texas; Acting; 2026–present	Incumbent
