= Dallas High School (Texas) =

Public secondary school in Dallas, Texas, U.S. (1884–1995)

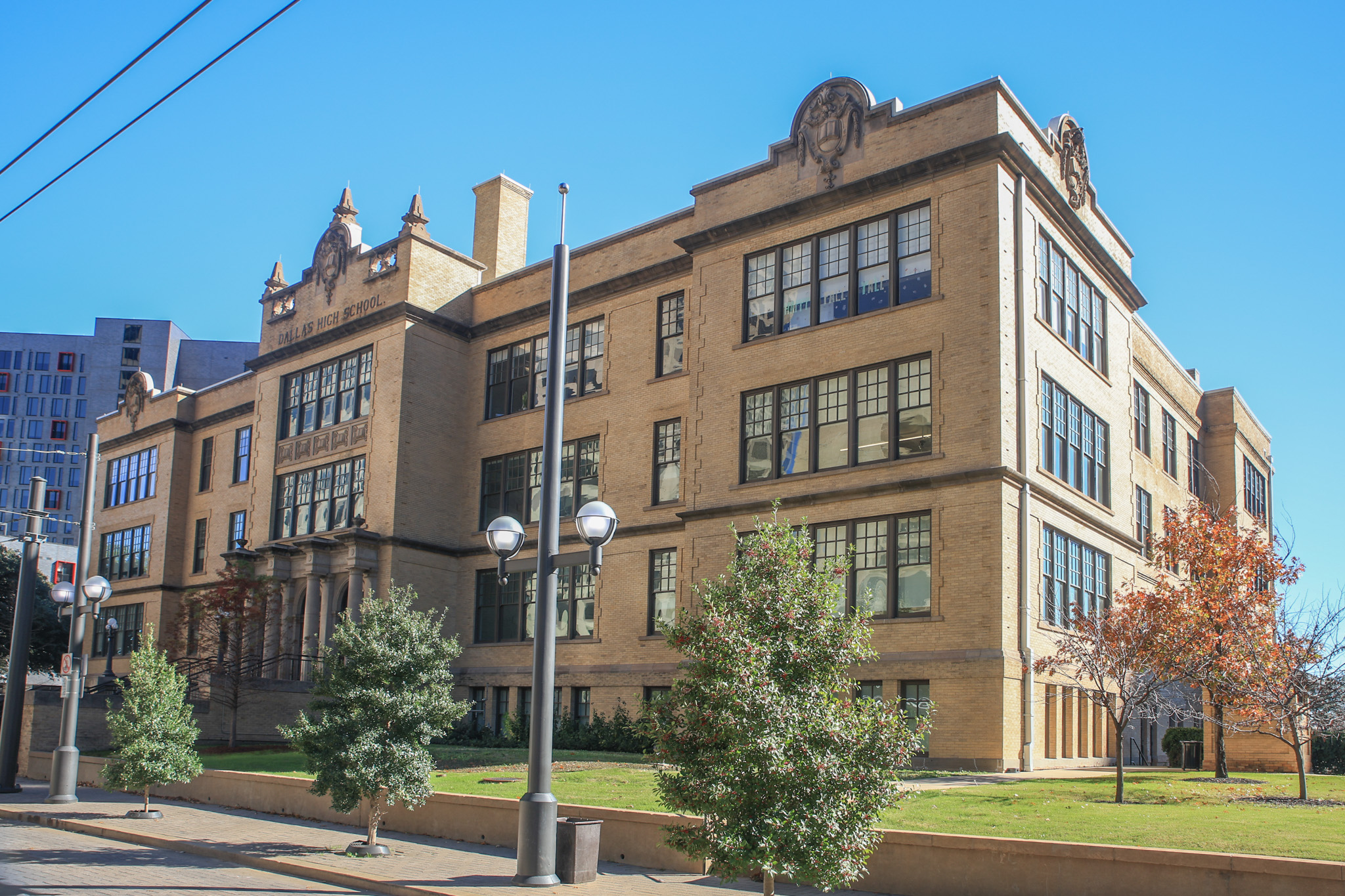
- Dallas High School building in 2023

Location
- 2218 Bryan St. Dallas, Texas; United States; 32°47′13″N 96°47′35″W

Information
- Other names: Central High School (1884–1908); Main High School (1916–1917); Bryan Street High School (1917–1928); Dallas Technical High School (1928–1942); Norman Robert Crozier Technical High School (1942–1975); Business and Management Magnet Center (1975–1995)
- Type: Public secondary school
- Established: 1884
- Closed: 1995
- School district: Dallas Independent School District
- Dallas High School Historic District
- U.S. National Register of Historic Places
- U.S. Historic district
- Dallas Landmark
- Location within Texas Location within the United States
- Area: 5.4 acres (2.2 ha)
- Built: 1907
- Built by: J. V. Chrisman; J. Y. Nesbit
- Architects: Lang & Witchell; Greene, LaRoche, & Dahl
- Architectural style: Art Deco
- NRHP reference No.: 96000035
- DLMK No.: H/101

Significant dates
- Added to NRHP: February 20, 1996
- Designated DLMK: December 13, 2000

Dallas High School was a public secondary school in Dallas, Texas. It is the alma mater of several notable Americans, including former U.S. attorney general and Supreme Court justice Tom C. Clark. Built in 1907, the 3.5-story classical revival structure is located in the downtown City Center District next to the Pearl/Arts District DART light rail station.

== History ==
Dallas High School changed names several times, becoming Main High School in 1916, Bryan Street High School in 1917, Dal-Tech High School in 1928, Crozier Technical High School in 1942, and Business Magnet School in 1976. The school closed in 1995.

The school campus was added to the National Register of Historic Places as the Dallas High School Historic District in 1996. The historic district comprises five contributing properties:

- Auditorium and Classroom Building, 1907
- Girls' Gymnasium and Manual Training Building, 1919-1920
- Classroom Building, 1930
- Arts and Science Building, 1941
- Boys' Gymnasium and Dressing Room, 1954

After being vacant for over 20 years, the building was renovated to become a mixed-use development with the first tenant arriving in 2017.

== Notable alumni ==
- Tom C. Clark
- C. Wright Mills
- Mike McKool, Sr.
- Gordon Kidd Teal
- Lee Patton
- Gordy Brown
- Turney W. Leonard

== See also ==
- National Register of Historic Places listings in Dallas County, Texas
- List of Dallas Landmarks
