= 67th Texas Legislature =

The 67th Texas Legislature met in regular session from January 13, 1981, to June 1, 1981, and in three subsequent special called sessions (see below). All members present during this session were elected in the 1980 general elections.

== Sessions ==
Regular Session: January 13, 1981 - June 1, 1981
1st Called Session: July 13, 1981 - August 11, 1981
2nd Called Session: May 24, 1982 - May 28, 1982
3rd Called Session: September 7, 1981 - September 9, 1982

== Party summary ==
=== Senate ===
Affiliation	Members	Note
Democratic Party	24	
Republican Party	7	
Total	31	

=== House ===
Affiliation	Members	Note
Democratic Party	113	
Republican Party	37	
Total	150	

== Officers ==
=== Senate ===
- Lieutenant Governor: William P. Hobby, Jr., Democrat
- President Pro Tempore (regular session): John Traeger, Democrat
- President Pro Tempore (1st called session): Jack Ogg, Democrat
- President Pro Tempore (2nd called session): Walter Mengden, Republican
- President Pro Tempore (3rd called session): John Wilson, Democrat

=== House ===
- Speaker of the House: Bill Wayne Clayton, Democrat

== Members ==
=== Senate ===
Dist. 1

- Ed Howard (D), Texarkana

Dist. 2

- Peyton McKnight (D), Tyler

Dist. 3

- Don Adams (D), Jasper

Dist. 4

- Carl A. Parker (D), Port Arthur

Dist. 5

- Kent A. Caperton (D), Bryan

Dist. 6

- Lindon Williams (D), Houston

Dist. 7

- Mike Richards (R), Houston

Dist. 8

- O.H. "Ike" Harris (R), Dallas

Dist. 9

- Dee Travis (R), Garland

Dist. 10

- Bill Meier (D), Euless

Dist. 11

- Chet Brooks (D), Houston

Dist. 12

- Betty Andujar (R), Fort Worth

Dist. 13

- Walter Mengden (R), Waco

Dist. 14

- Lloyd Doggett (D), Austin

Dist. 15

- Jack Ogg (D), Houston

Dist. 16

- John N. Leedom (R), Dallas

Dist. 17

- J. E. "Buster" Brown (R), Lake Jackson

Dist. 18

- John Wilson (D), La Grange

Dist. 19

- Glenn Kothmann (D), San Antonio

Dist. 20

- Carlos F. Truan (D), Corpus Christi

Dist. 21

- John Traeger (D), Seguin

Dist. 22

- Bob Glasgow (D), Stephenville

Dist. 23

- Oscar Mauzy (D), Dallas

Dist. 24

- Grant Jones (D), Abilene

Dist. 25

- W. E. "Pete" Snelson (D), Midland

Dist. 26

- R.L. "Bob" Vale (D), San Antonio

Dist. 27

- Raul Longoria (D), Edinburg

Dist. 28

- E L Short (D), Tahoka

Dist. 29

- Tati Santiesteban (D), El Paso

Dist. 30

- Ray Farabee (D), Wichita Falls

Dist. 31

- Bill Sarpalius (D), Amarillo
