= 1994 Texas Comptroller of Public Accounts election =

- November 8, 1994
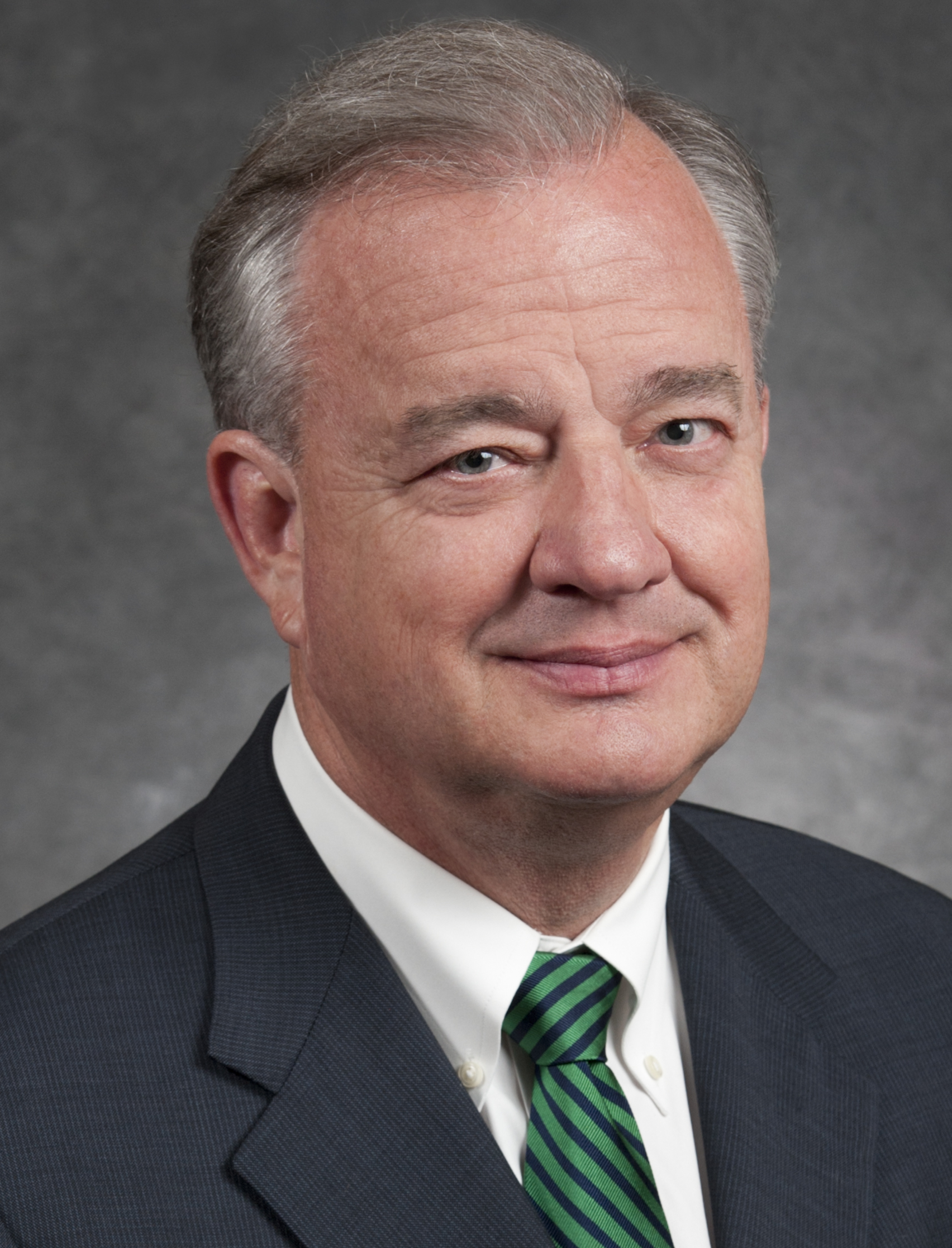

Nominee	John Sharp	Teresa Doggett
Party	Democratic	Republican
Popular vote	2,318,345	1,860,270
Percentage	55.5%	44.5%
- County results Sharp: 50–60% 60–70% 70–80% 80–90% Doggett: 50–60% 60–70%
Comptroller before election
John Sharp
Democratic
Elected Comptroller
John Sharp
Democratic

The 1994 Texas Comptroller of Public Accounts election took place on November 8, 1994, to elect the comptroller of Public Accounts of Texas. Incumbent Democratic comptroller John Sharp ran for a second term. In the Democratic primary, he won the nomination unopposed. Sharp defeated Republican nominee Teresa Doggett in the general election. This was the last time a Democrat was elected Comptroller of Texas until 2026.

== Republican primary ==
=== Results ===
Republican primary results
Party	Candidate	Votes	%
Republican	Teresa Doggett	364,882	100.0
Total votes		364,882	100.0

== Democratic primary ==
=== Results ===
Democratic primary results
Party	Candidate	Votes	%
Democratic	John Sharp (incumbent)	770,584	100.0%
Total votes		770,584	100.0%

== General election ==
=== Results ===
1994 election for Comptroller of Public Accounts
Party	Candidate	Votes	%	±%
Democratic	John Sharp (incumbent)	2,318,345	55.48	
Republican	Teresa Doggett	1,860,270	44.52	
Total votes		4,178,615	100.00	
Democratic hold				
