= V. Larry Teaver Jr. =

American politician (1919–2005)

Virgil Larry Teaver, Jr. (March 30, 1919 – September 2005) was an assistant in the administration of Texas Governor Preston Smith who served as secretary of state for seventeen days, from January 2 to January 19, 1973. After 1978, he worked as the Project Manager for Lakeridge Estates in Lubbock, Texas.

He was born and grew up in Lochney, Texas. He was married for sixty-two years to the former Suzanne "Sue" Yerby (1922–2004), a native of Cheyenne, Wyoming. They had two sons, Jim (deceased) and Bill (deceased), and two grandchildren, Jonathan and Jordan. As a young man, Teaver would often work with livestock and was able to travel the forty eight states of America after he'd left high school on his own. He served in the U.S. Army in World War II as a sergeant in the Philippines and worked on the board for the Managed Care Center for Addictive Disorders later in life.

Political offices
Preceded by Bob Bullock	Secretary of State of Texas; January 2, 1973 – January 19, 1973	Succeeded by Mark White
