= Bob Bullock =

American politician (1929–1999)

- Official picture in the Texas State Senate

38th Lieutenant Governor of Texas
- In office January 15, 1991 – January 19, 1999
- Governor: Ann Richards; George W. Bush
- Preceded by: William P. Hobby Jr.
- Succeeded by: Rick Perry

34th Comptroller of Texas
- In office January 21, 1975 – January 3, 1991
- Governor: Dolph Briscoe; Bill Clements; Mark White
- Preceded by: Robert S. Calvert
- Succeeded by: John Sharp

72nd Secretary of State of Texas
- In office September 1, 1971 – January 2, 1973
- Governor: Preston Smith
- Preceded by: Martin Dies Jr.
- Succeeded by: V. Larry Teaver Jr.

Member of the Texas House of Representatives from the 54th district
- In office January 8, 1957 – October 18, 1959
- Preceded by: Jim Joseph Carmichall
- Succeeded by: Ronald E. Roberts

Personal details
- Born: Robert Douglas Bullock; July 10, 1929 Hillsboro, Texas, U.S.
- Died: June 18, 1999 (aged 69) Austin, Texas, U.S.
- Resting place: Texas State Cemetery, Austin, Texas, U.S.
- Party: Democratic
- Spouses: Amelia J. Hooks (m. 1950; div. 1978); Gloria Jan Felts (m. 1985)
- Children: 3
- Education: Texas Tech University (BA); Baylor University (LLB)
- Profession: Attorney

Military service
- Allegiance: United States
- Branch/service: United States Air Force
- Years of service: 1951–1954
- Rank: Staff Sergeant
- Battles/wars: Korean War

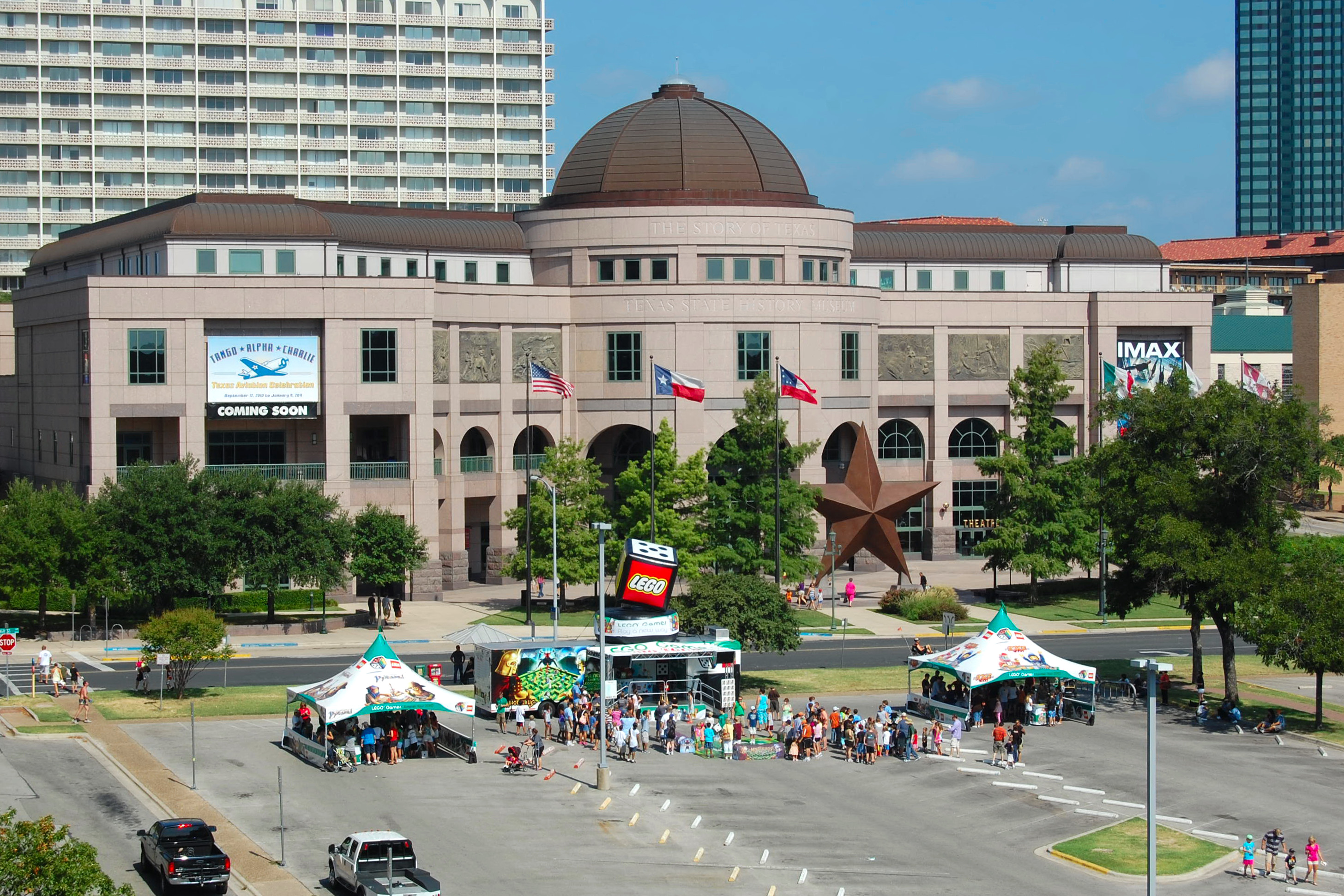
The Texas State History Museum in Austin is named for Bullock, who as lieutenant governor pushed for establishment of the facility. Photo taken in 2010.

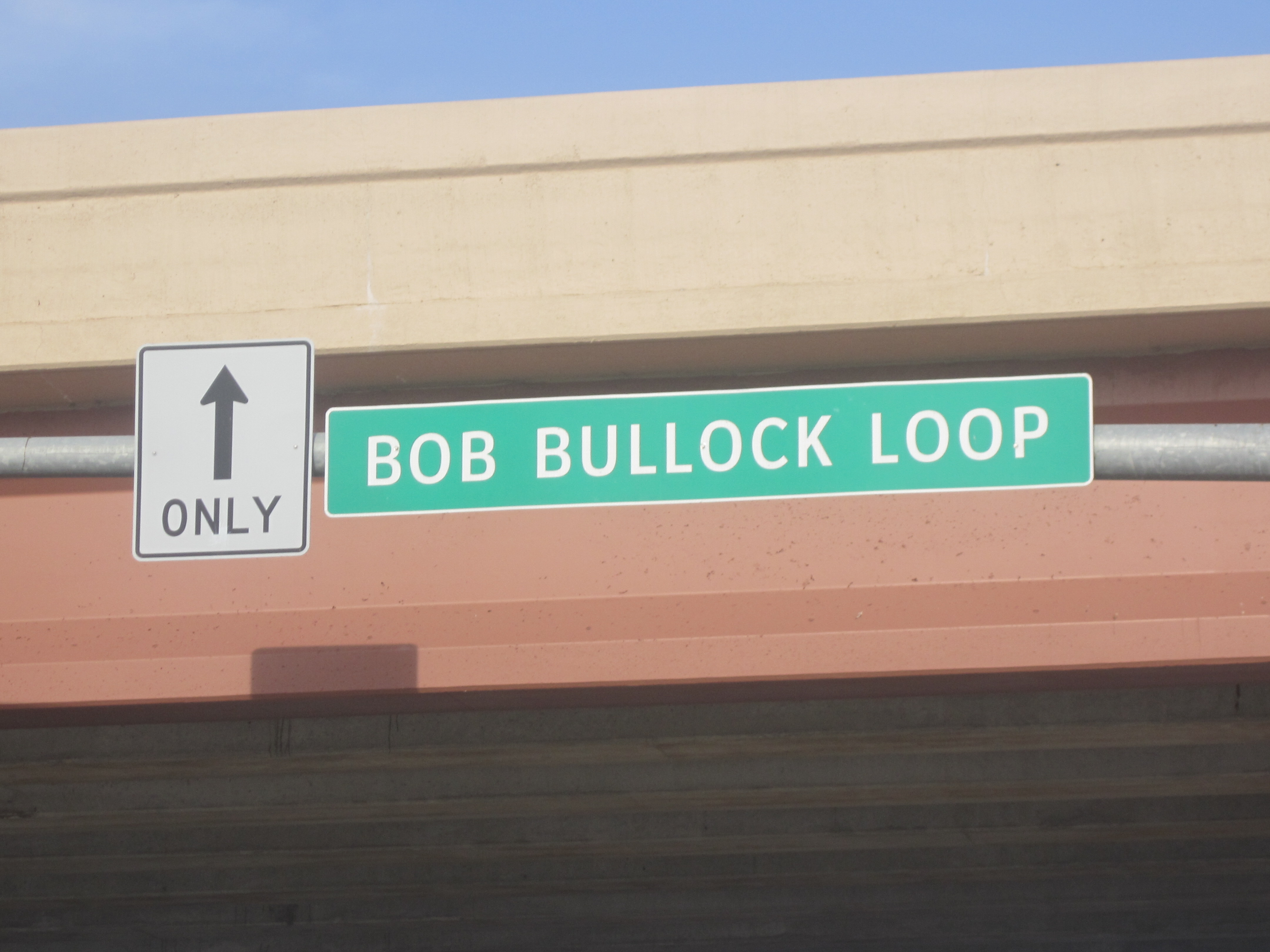
The Bob Bullock Expressway in Laredo, Texas is an outlying segment of Interstate 35.

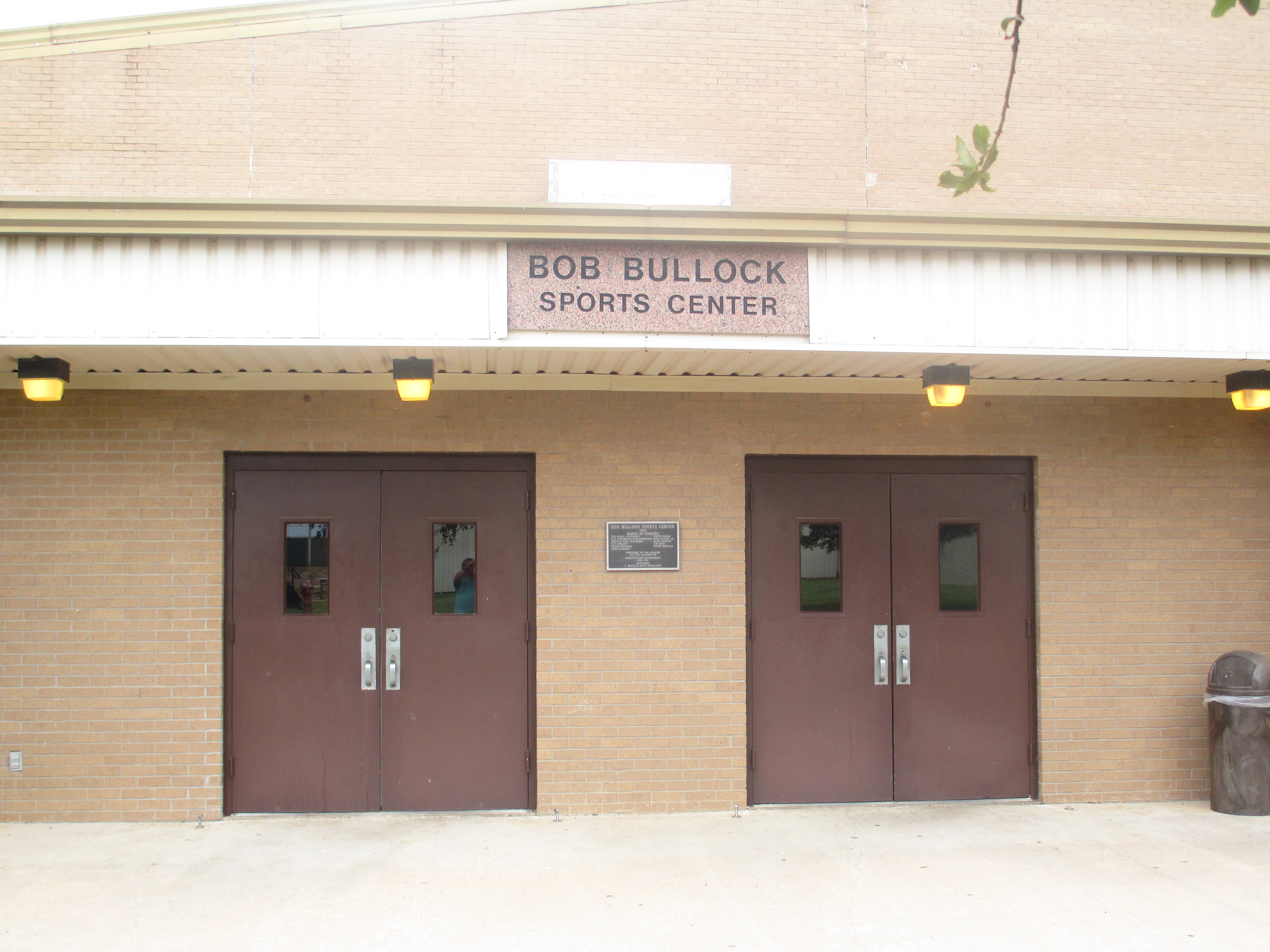
The Bob Bullock Sports Center at Hill College in his native Hillsboro, Texas, opened in 1988, when Bullock was still the Texas state comptroller.

Robert Douglas Bullock (July 10, 1929 – June 18, 1999) was an American attorney and Democratic politician from Texas, whose career spanned four decades. His service culminated in his term as the 38th lieutenant governor of Texas from 1991 to 1999, during the term of Governor Ann Richards and the first term of Governor George W. Bush. Bullock was among the last Democrats to win or hold statewide office in Texas until 2026.

== Early life ==
Robert Douglas Bullock was born in Hillsboro in Hill County on July 10, 1929, to Ruth Mitchell and Thomas Austin Bullock, a Hillsboro city engineer and manager. Bullock graduated from Hillsboro High School in 1947 and attended Hill College, a junior college, in 1949. He served in the United States Air Force during the Korean War from 1951 to 1954.

Bullock graduated from Texas Tech University with a Bachelor of Arts. He also graduated from Baylor University with a law degree in 1958.

== Political career ==
After Bullock began his career in public service as a member of the Texas House of Representatives, he resigned in October 1959 to practice law and later served as general counsel of the Texas Automobile Dealers Association. He returned to public life when he was appointed Secretary of State of Texas, the state's chief elections and records officer, by Governor Preston Smith. Bullock soon left the post to prepare for a statewide race for state comptroller in the 1974 Democratic primary. He served for four consecutive four-year terms. He was one of the last Democrats to win a statewide election in Texas.

== Texas Comptroller of Public Accounts ==
In 1973, Bullock first sought the Democratic nomination for Comptroller of Public Accounts. The octogenarian incumbent, Robert S. Calvert, soon withdrew from the contest when he gauged Bullock's strength. In November 1974, Bullock won the general election, defeating Republican Nick Rowe, a former Vietnam War prisoner of war. Bullock garnered 1,099,559 votes (71.61%) to Rowe's 419,657 votes (27.33%).

Once sworn in as comptroller in January 1975, Bullock promised to modernize the office. During his sixteen years in office, Bullock pledged fair but aggressive audits. He made statewide headlines with a long series of "raids" on businesses that had collected state taxes from customers for many years but had not turned them in to the state. Bullock had pledged to secure these owed taxes; the officials collecting them were known as "Bullock's Raiders". As an outgrowth of his tax collecting efforts, that term entered the Texas government lexicon.

Bullock was also the first elected state official to adopt an equal opportunity employment program, a policy that Calvert had opposed. Also, Bullock was among the first elected officials to use computer technology in state government to cut costs and improve productivity. He was the winner of numerous national awards for his management skills, including the "Leon Rothenberg Taxpayer Service Award". As comptroller, Bullock's frequent and increasingly accurate forecasts on state finances allowed the legislature to budget more accurately. He also developed a "Taxpayers Bill of Rights" to guarantee fairness, courtesy and common sense.

Bullock was re-elected in 1978 virtually unopposed, garnering 1,288,320 votes (100.00%) since nobody bothered to run against him. In 1982 he defeated Republican Mike Richards, garnering 1,791,650 votes (58.02%) to Richards' 1,245,328 votes (40.33%). In 1986 Bullock had no Republican opponent; he defeated Libertarian George Meeks, garnering 2,416,658 votes (90.02%) to Meeks' 267,872 votes (9.98%).

Although Bullock refused to seek the governorship during the 1980s, he set eyes on the lieutenant governorship when on June 1, 1987, longtime incumbent William P. "Bill" Hobby Jr. of Houston announced that he would not seek a sixth term. Bullock quickly announced his candidacy for lieutenant governor in September 1987.

== Lieutenant Governorship ==
In 1990, Bullock was elected Lieutenant Governor, having defeated the 39-year-old Republican nominee, businessman Robert Mosbacher Jr., of Houston, the son of the sitting United States Secretary of Commerce Robert Mosbacher. Bullock received 2,002,360 votes (51.69 percent) to Mosbacher's 1,741,893 votes (44.97 percent); he took office on January 15, 1991, as Democrat Ann W. Richards became the state's second female governor. In 1994, Bullock was easily elected to a second four-year term over Republican Harold "Tex" Lezar; Bullock received 2,631,843 votes (61.48 percent) to Lezar's 1,648,848 votes (38.52 percent). Bullock was inaugurated for his second term on January 17, 1995, while Republican George W. Bush was sworn in as Texas's 46th governor, having unseated Ann Richards. Bullock did not seek election to a third term in 1998; he was succeeded by Republican Agriculture Commissioner (and later Governor) Rick Perry on January 19, 1999.

Serving as Texas's 38th lieutenant governor, Bullock favored a hands-on management style that resulted in numerous achievements as the presiding officer of the Texas Senate. Bullock overhauled the ethics laws during his first term in an effort to restore public confidence in state government. He created the Texas Performance Review for the state comptroller to analyze spending at state agencies and recommended cost-saving alternatives. He helped consolidate all environmental agencies into one department in an effort to better serve Texans and protecting the state's natural resources. As the state's second-highest elected statewide officeholder, Bullock aggressively pushed through a constitutional amendment requiring voter approval before a state personal income tax could be enacted and requiring the money be earmarked for education, if voters approve the tax. He led efforts to modernize the Texas tax system and worked on state problems in tort reform, health and juvenile justice. Bullock was instrumental in finding a legislative solution to get Texas out of federal court lawsuits involving prisons and mental health. He was a leader in legislative efforts to revamp the state's educational funding system and ushered through a law that created the state's first comprehensive water conservation and management plan. As lieutenant governor, he professed a nonpartisan approach to lawmaking, often telling members of the Texas Senate to leave their politics at the door.

Bullock and Bush got along well, in part because Bullock got to lead an increasingly Republican legislature to agree to key laws and policies and, "when they passed, Bullock and House Speaker Pete Laney allowed Bush to claim some credit." Bullock unofficially endorsed Republican Governor Bush's presidential campaign even before it got off the ground.

At a November 8, 2006, post-election press conference, a reporter from the Austin American-Statesman, who had covered Bush's tenure as governor, asked Bush if he thought then U.S. House Speaker-elect Nancy Pelosi resembled Bullock. The President replied that the reporter's question was an inside joke. The question was a thinly veiled reference to the close working relationship between Bush and Bullock; the reporter apparently was asking whether Bush would be capable of forging a similar bipartisan relationship with the members of the new Democratic legislative majority in the U.S. Congress.

Bullock was renowned for his blunt and sometimes politically incorrect speaking style, but also for his trademark closing line "God bless Texas". A lover of Texas history, he was instrumental in the establishment of the Texas State History Museum, located just to the north of the State Capitol in Austin. Opened to the public on April 21, 2001 (San Jacinto Day) after Bullock's death, it was named in his honor. The second-floor lobby of the museum features a seven-foot-tall bronze statue of Bullock holding a giant gavel, next to a gallery of items and a video from his career in politics.

His political papers are housed in the Baylor Collection of Political Materials.

== Personal life ==
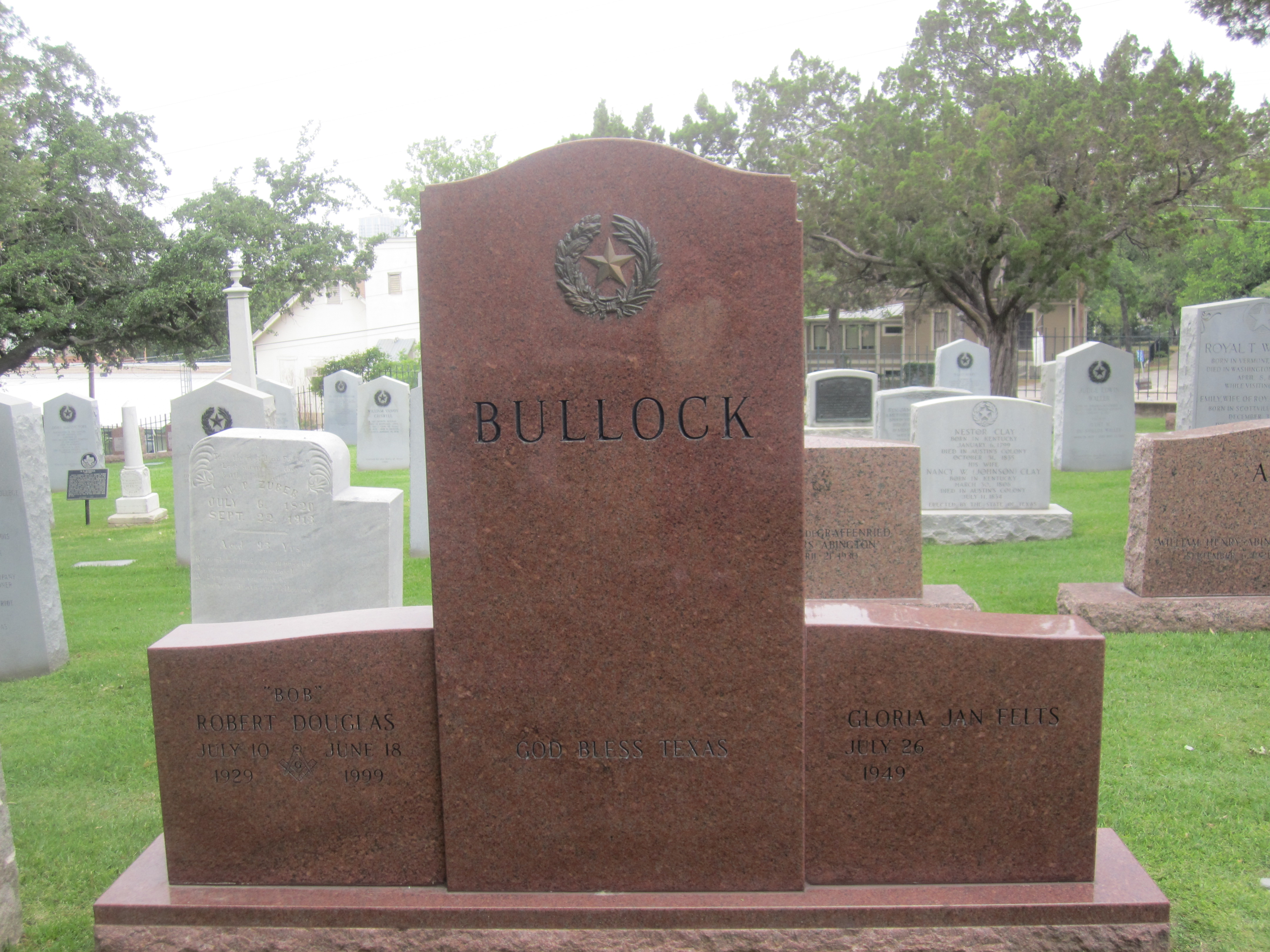
Bob Bullock grave marker at Texas State Cemetery in Austin, Texas

Bullock's adult life was marred by alcoholism and divorce; he had a total of five marriages, although at least one of them was a repeat. He stopped drinking in 1981 and remained active with Alcoholics Anonymous for the remainder of his life.

He married Amelia J. Hooks of Itasca in 1950 and divorced in 1978. He married Jan Felts Teague of Austin in 1985. He had two children from his first marriage, Lindy Bullock Ward and Robert Douglas "Bobby" Bullock Jr. He also had another daughter from his second marriage, Kimberly Teague.

== Death ==
Bullock died at his home in Austin of cancer on June 18, 1999, and is interred at the Texas State Cemetery.

== Honors ==
Texas State Highway Loop 20 in Laredo is named the Bob Bullock Loop in his honor. The Texas State History Museum, located a few blocks north of the Capitol Building in Austin, is named to honor Bullock's efforts in the establishment of the facility.

Party political offices
Preceded by Robert S. Calvert	Democratic nominee for Texas Comptroller of Public Accounts; 1974, 1978, 1982, 1986	Succeeded by John Sharp
Preceded by William P. Hobby Jr.	Democratic nominee for Lieutenant Governor of Texas; 1990, 1994	Succeeded by John Sharp
Texas House of Representatives
Preceded by Jim Carmichall	Member of the Texas House of Representatives from District 54 (Hillsboro); 1957–1959	Succeeded by Ronald E. Roberts
Political offices
Preceded by Martin Dies, III	Secretary of State of Texas; 1971–1973	Succeeded by V. Larry Teaver Jr.
Preceded by Robert S. Calvert	Texas Comptroller of Public Accounts; 1975–1991	Succeeded by John Sharp
Preceded by William P. Hobby Jr.	Lieutenant Governor of Texas; January 15, 1991 – January 19, 1999	Succeeded by Rick Perry
