= John Carona =

American politician

John Joseph Carona

Member of the Texas Senate from the 16th district
- In office June 20, 1996 – January 13, 2015
- Preceded by: John N. Leedom
- Succeeded by: Don Huffines

Member of the Texas House of Representatives
- In office January 8, 1991 – June 20, 1996
- Preceded by: Bill Hammond
- Succeeded by: Helen Giddings
- Constituency: 109th district (1991-1993); 108th district (1993–1996)

Personal details
- Born: December 14, 1955 (age 70) Texas City, Texas, USA
- Party: Republican
- Spouse: Helen Carona
- Children: 5
- Education: Bryan Adams High School; University of Texas at Austin
- Occupation: director, CEO, and president of Associations, Inc., aka "Associa"
- Profession: Businessman
- Website: Official website

John Joseph Carona (born December 14, 1955) is an American businessman who served in the Texas Senate from 1996 to 2015. A member of the Republican Party, he served in the Texas House of Representatives from 1991 to 1996.

== Texas State Senate ==
In the 2013 legislative session, Carona chaired the Senate Committee on Business and Commerce. He was also a member of the Senate Criminal Justice, Education, Jurisprudence and Redistricting committees.

In May 2012, acrimony between Carona and colleague Dan Patrick of Houston, a fellow Republican and Baptist, was widely reported throughout the state. In an email exchange, Patrick accused Carona of spreading false rumors about Patrick's marriage; Carona denied having questioned Patrick's marriage or having made comments about Patrick's sexuality. Carona further said to Patrick: "I've never been shy about sharing my dislike and distrust of you. Put bluntly, I believe you are a snake oil salesman, a narcissist that would say anything to draw attention to himself."

== Business ==
Carona is director, CEO, and president of Associations, Inc. aka "Associa". Associa is a holding company for one of the largest collections of HOA management companies and related businesses in the United States. Carona has come under scrutiny for his business practices and his legislative activity including authoring, voting on, and modifying legislation that benefited his Associa organization.

== Personal life ==
Born in Texas City, Texas, Carona was a resident of East Dallas since early childhood, but now lives in Preston Hollow. He was educated in the Dallas Independent School District and graduated from Bryan Adams High School. In 1978, he received two Bachelor of Business Administration degrees in insurance and real estate from the University of Texas at Austin in 1978.

== Election history ==
Senate election history of Carona from 1998.

=== Most recent elections ===
==== 2014 ====
Texas Republican Primary election, 2014: Senate District 16
Party	Candidate	Votes	%	±%
Republican	Don Huffines	25,141	50.63	
Republican	John Carona (Incumbent)	24,509	49.36	
Turnout		49,650		

=== Previous elections ===
==== 2012 ====
Texas general election, 2012: Senate District 16
Party	Candidate	Votes	%	±%
Republican	John Carona (Incumbent)	181,746	100.00	
Turnout		181,746		

==== 2008 ====
Texas general election, 2008: Senate District 16
Party	Candidate	Votes	%	±%
Republican	John Carona (Incumbent)	121,928	56.25	−43.75
Democratic	Rain Levy Minns	89,000	41.06	+41.06
Libertarian	Paul E. Osborn	5,806	2.67	+2.67
Turnout		216,734		
Republican hold				

==== 2004 ====
Texas general election, 2004: Texas Senate, District 16
Party	Candidate	Votes	%	±%
Republican	John Carona (Incumbent)	142,542	100.00	+35.93
Majority		142,542	100.00	+69.95
Turnout		142,542		−4.72
Republican hold				

==== 2002 ====
Texas general election, 2002: Senate District 16
Party	Candidate	Votes	%	±%
Republican	John Carona (Incumbent)	95,853	67.07	−35.93
Democratic	Jan Erik Frederiksen	50,895	34.02	+34.02
Libertarian	Jack Thompson	2,857	1.91	+1.91
Majority		44,958	30.05	−69.95
Turnout		149,605		+85.15
Republican hold				

==== 1998 ====
Texas general election, 1998: Senate District 16
Party	Candidate	Votes	%	±%
Republican	John Carona (Incumbent)	80,802	100.00	
Majority		80,802	100.00	
Turnout		80,802		
Republican hold				

Texas House of Representatives
Preceded by Bill Hammond	Member of the Texas House of Representatives from District 109 (Dallas); 1991–1993	Succeeded by Helen Giddings
Preceded by Al Granoff	Member of the Texas House of Representatives from District 108 (Dallas); 1993–1996	Succeeded by Carolyn Galloway
Texas Senate
Preceded by John N. Leedom	Texas State Senator from District 16 (Dallas)^{(1)} 1996-2015	Succeeded by Don Huffines
Notes and references
1. For the 76th through the 77th Legislatures, Carona’s home city was Garland
