= Robert S. Calvert =

American politician (1892–1981)

Texas Comptroller of Public Accounts
- In office January 18, 1949 – January 3, 1975
- Governor: Beauford Jester; Allan Shivers; Price Daniel; John Connally; Preston Smith; Dolph Briscoe
- Preceded by: George H. Sheppard
- Succeeded by: Bob Bullock

Personal details
- Born: Robert Seale Calvert; April 27, 1892 McGregor, Texas, U.S.
- Died: September 1, 1981 (aged 89) Austin, Texas, U.S.
- Resting place: Austin Memorial Park Cemetery
- Party: Democratic
- Education: Howard Payne Junior College

Military service
- Allegiance: United States
- Branch/service: United States Army
- Years of service: 1917-1919
- Rank: Sergeant
- Battles/wars: World War I

Robert Seale Calvert (April 27, 1892 – September 1, 1981) was the longest-serving Texas Comptroller of Public Accounts, serving for 26 years.

From 1909 to 1910, Calvert attended Baptist-affiliated Howard Payne Junior College in Brownwood, Texas.

On January 18, 1949, Calvert was appointed by Governor Beauford Jester to the position of Texas Comptroller of Public Accounts following the death of his predecessor, George H. Sheppard, who died in office. He was elected to a full term in 1950 and re-elected in 1952, 1954, 1956, 1958, 1960, 1962, 1964, 1966, 1968, 1970 and 1972, serving for twenty-six years.

When the African American then State Representative Eddie Bernice Johnson, later a member of the United States House of Representatives, filed a complaint with the Equal Employment Opportunity Commission (EEOC) in 1973, Calvert said in response, that Johnson was a "nigger woman who doesn't know what she is talking about." The EEOC ruled that racial discrimination could be inferred based on Calvert's response.

In 1972, Randy Pendleton, a former legislator from Andrews in West Texas, and Jim Wilson, a former employee, ran against Calvert. There was a run-off between Calvert and Wilson, in which Calvert won.

In 1974, Bob Bullock announced that he would challenge the octogenarian comptroller and promised to reform operations of the office. Bullock was so aggressive that Calvert withdrew from the race, and Bullock was elected to the first of four terms.

Calvert died in Austin in September 1981.

== Sources ==
Party political offices
Preceded by George H. Sheppard	Democratic nominee for Texas Comptroller of Public Accounts; 1950, 1952, 1954, 1956, 1958, 1960, 1962, 1964, 1966, 1968, 1970, 1972	Succeeded by Bob Bullock
Preceded by Dan Barnhart	Republican nominee for Texas Comptroller of Public Accounts; 1952	Vacant Title next held by Aleene Smith
Political offices
Preceded by George H. Sheppard	Texas Comptroller of Public Accounts; 1949-1975	Succeeded by Bob Bullock
