= Bill Braecklein =

American politician

Member of the Texas Senate from the 16th district
- In office January 9, 1973 – January 13, 1981
- Preceded by: Mike McKool Sr.
- Succeeded by: John N. Leedom

Member of the Texas House of Representatives from the 33-1 district
- In office January 10, 1967 – January 9, 1973
- Preceded by: District created
- Succeeded by: District abolished

Personal details
- Born: December 20, 1920 Los Angeles, California
- Died: November 14, 2001 (aged 80) Dallas, Texas
- Party: Democratic

Bill Braecklein (December 20, 1920 – November 14, 2001) was an American politician who served in the Texas House of Representatives from the 33-1 district from 1967 to 1973 and in the Texas Senate from the 16th district from 1973 to 1981.
