= Andy Brown (politician) =

American attorney and politician

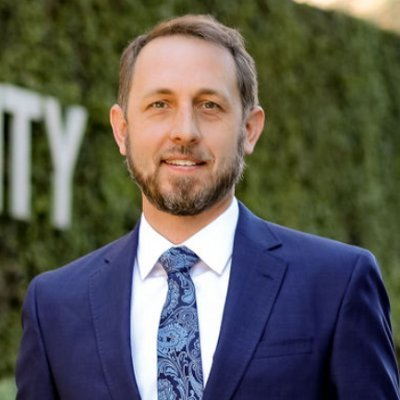
- Brown in 2021

Travis County Judge
- Incumbent
- Assumed office November 17, 2020
- Preceded by: Sarah Eckhardt

Personal details
- Born: Andrew Steven Brown; December 2, 1972 (age 53) San Bernardino County, California
- Party: Democratic
- Spouse: Sara Strother (m. 2012)
- Children: 2
- Education: Colorado College (BA); University of Texas at Austin (JD)

Andrew Steven Brown (born December 2, 1972) is an American attorney and politician from the U.S. state of Texas. On November 17, 2020, he was sworn in as Travis County Judge.

Raised in Austin, Texas in Hyde Park, he graduated from McCallum High School where he was class president.

Former field organizer for the Texas Democratic Party, former campaign manager for U.S. Representative Lloyd Doggett in 2004; ran for 48th District of the Texas House of Representatives in 2006 before dropping out because of a residency issue. He was the Travis County Democratic Party Chair from 2008 to 2013. Brown was Finance Director and Senior Advisor to U.S. Senate and presidential candidate Beto O'Rourke. In 1995, moved to Tegucigalpa, Honduras, where he helped with nonprofit campaign to rid country of leaded gasoline. He is fluent in Spanish.

== Personal life ==
In 2012, Brown married nurse practitioner Sara Strother of Bryan, Texas. They have two children.
