= Sarah Eckhardt =

Comptroller-elect of Texas

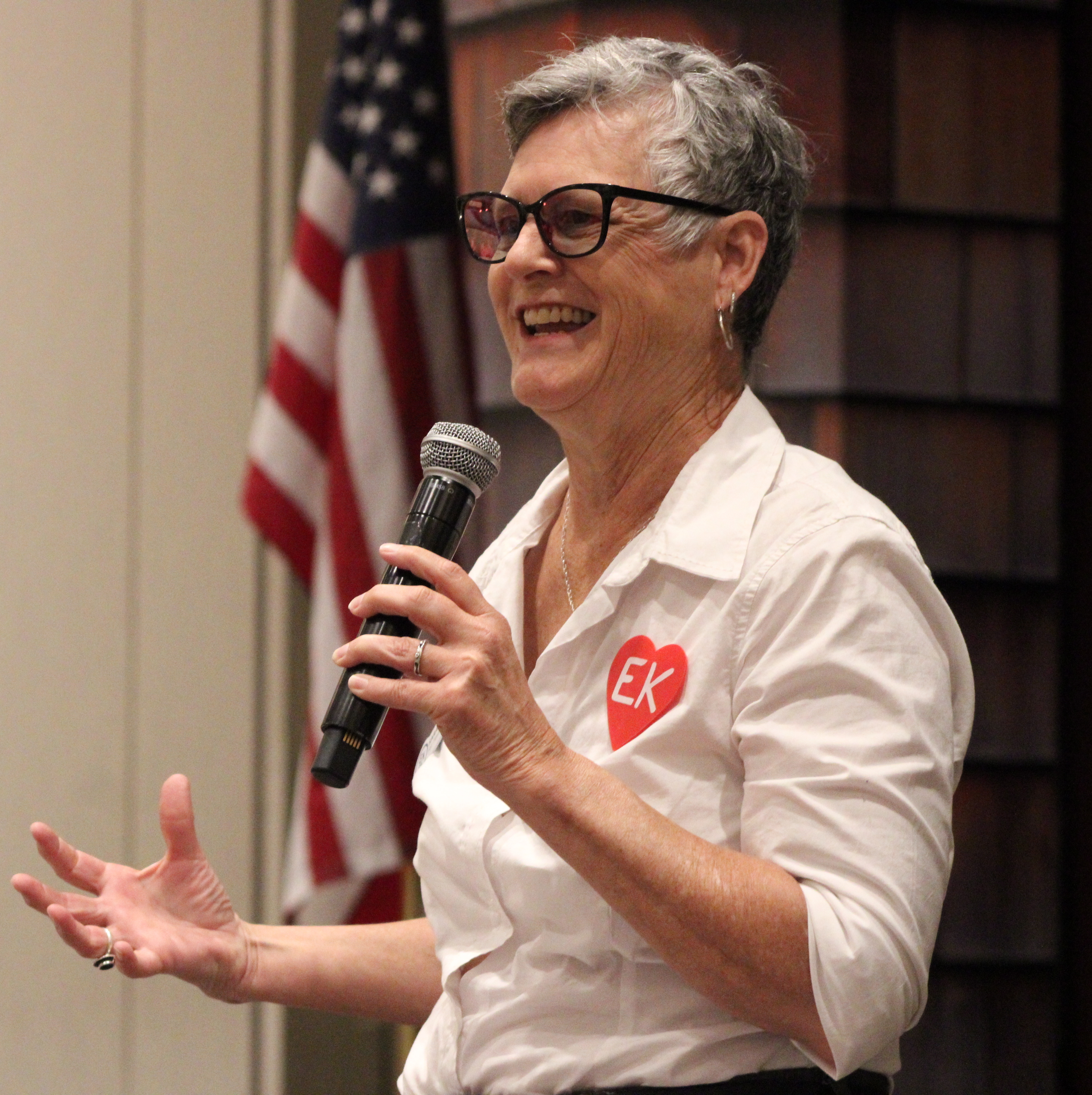
- Eckhardt in 2026

41st Comptroller-elect of Texas
- Assuming office January 2, 2027
- Governor: Gina Hinojosa (elect)
- Succeeding: Don Huffines

Member of the Texas Senate from the 14th district
- Incumbent
- Assumed office July 31, 2020
- Preceded by: Kirk Watson

County Judge of Travis County
- In office January 1, 2015 – May 13, 2020
- Preceded by: Sam Biscoe
- Succeeded by: Sam Biscoe

Personal details
- Born: 1964 (age 61–62)
- Party: Democratic
- Spouse: Kurt Sauer (m. 1998; div. 2016)
- Children: 2
- Parent: Bob Eckhardt (father)
- Education: New York University (BFA); University of Texas at Austin (MPA, JD)
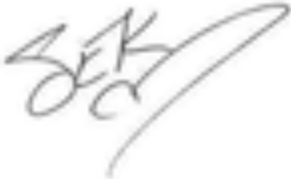
- Signature
- Website: State Senate website; Campaign website

Sarah Eckhardt (born 1964) is an American attorney and politician who is the comptroller-elect of Texas. A member of the Democratic Party, she has represented the 14th district in the Texas Senate since 2020. Eckhardt was the county judge of Travis County from 2015 to 2020.

On December 8, 2025, Eckhardt announced her candidacy for Texas comptroller. She won the Democratic primary for comptroller on March 3, 2026, becoming the party's nominee. On November 3rd, 2026 she defeated Republican Texas Comptroller Don Huffines to become the 41st Texas Comptroller of Public Accounts.

== Early life ==
Eckhardt is the daughter of Bob Eckhardt, a Democratic politician who represented the Houston area in Congress from 1967 to 1981. Eckhardt attended the High School for the Performing and Visual Arts in Houston. She appeared in the 1981 film Student Bodies. Eckhardt earned a Bachelor of Fine Arts in Theater from New York University in 1986, and joined the Atlantic Theater Company.

== Government and political career ==
Returning to Texas, Eckhardt worked with Ann Richards' 1990 gubernatorial campaign. She was a delegate to the 1992 Democratic National Convention. She became a paralegal in 1993, and enrolled at the University of Texas at Austin in 1994, earning a Master of Public Affairs and Juris Doctor. Eckhardt served as an assistant county attorney for Travis County from 1998 to 2005.

=== Travis County Commissioners Court ===
Eckhardt was elected to the Travis County Commissioners Court to represent Precinct 2 in the 2006 elections. She was reelected in 2010. In 2013, she resigned her position on the court in order to be eligible to run to succeed retiring long-time county judge Sam T. Biscoe. In March 2014, she defeated Andy Brown in the Democratic primary and, that fall, she was elected Travis County judge. She was the first woman elected as a judge in Travis County, and won a second term as judge in 2018.

As both a county judge and a county commissioner, Eckhardt served on the Capital Area Metropolitan Planning Organization Transportation Policy Board, which adopts regional transportation plans and allocates federal funding. Eckhardt often criticized the board's perceived lack of focus on improving air quality and reducing single-occupancy vehicles, advocating for increased investment in public transportation, bike lanes, sidewalks, and transportation demand management. Eckhardt was a vocal supporter of Project Connect, and was involved in the early planning of the project, which will build new light rail, commuter rail, rapid buses, and affordable housing across Austin.

In 2017, Eckhardt and Austin mayor Steve Adler launched the Master Community Workforce Plan with local non-profits, with the goal of lifting 10,000 residents out of poverty in five years through job reskilling. The American Enterprise Institute found the program increased the number of people exiting poverty by 201% in its first year.

Eckhardt led the campaign for $185 million in transportation and parks bonds. On November 8, 2017, the bonds passed, with over 73% of Travis County voters voting in favor. Eckhardt advocated for oversight of the bonds by an independent consultant rather than by county staff, a decision that substantially increased the county's capacity to deliver bond investments on time.

In 2019, Eckhardt helped create Travis County's first public defender's office, securing a $24.6 million state grant to help fund the program. Travis County was previously the largest county in the United States without a public defender's office.

On March 6, 2020, in consultation with public health experts and other local officials, Eckhardt declared a local state of disaster in response to COVID-19, and canceled that year's South by Southwest festival. On March 24, 2020, Eckhardt issued a stay-at-home order, requiring all nonessential businesses to close or have employees work from home.

In spring 2020, when Kirk Watson announced he would resign from the Texas Senate, Eckhardt announced that she would run in the special election to succeed him, and resigned as county judge to do so in accordance with the Texas Constitution. She received 49.7% of the vote, just shy of the 50% required to avoid a runoff. Eddie Rodriguez, who finished in second with 34% of the vote, decided to forgo the runoff, making Eckhardt the winner. Her predecessor as county judge, Sam T. Biscoe, served as interim county judge until the swearing in of Andy Brown, who was elected in November 2020.

On December 4, 2020, Eckhardt was sanctioned by the Texas State Commission on Judicial Conduct (CJC) for wearing a pussy hat while presiding over a meeting of the commissioners' court in January 2017, and for stating in 2019 that Greg Abbott "hates trees because one fell on him." Eckhardt had previously apologized for the joke, but disputed the commission's jurisdiction noting that the Travis County Judge serves as the county's chief executive and has no judicial role. A special court of review agreed with Eckhardt and overturned the CJC's decision, writing that Eckhardt was a "'judge' in name only" and that the commission "overreached in rebuking her."

=== Texas Senate ===
Eckhardt was sworn in as a member of the Texas Senate on July 31, 2020, representing District 14.

In 2023, Eckhardt authored legislation to amend the state's Academic Fresh Start Law to allow universities to waive a student's academic records for admission purposes after five years. The bill was subsequently vetoed by Governor Greg Abbott over an unrelated disagreement over property taxes. Eckhardt authored the bill again in 2025, and Abbott signed it into law.

In September 2023, after the Texas Senate voted to acquit Attorney General Ken Paxton of all articles of impeachment, Eckhardt placed a statement in the Senate Journal criticizing Lieutenant Governor Dan Patrick in his role as presiding officer during the trial. Eckhardt alleged that Patrick lacked judicial qualifications and neutrality, and also criticized his acceptance of a $3 million contribution from a political action committee allied with Paxton prior to the trial. Patrick responded to Eckhardt's statement by noting his conduct was within the rules adopted by the Senate and called on Eckhardt to retract her statement, which she did not.

In 2025, Eckhardt passed legislation exempting paramedics from tuition and fees for courses at public colleges and universities.

Eckhardt led the opposition to the nomination of Austin police officer Justin Berry to the Texas Commission on Law Enforcement, citing allegations of excessive force. Berry had been indicted in 2022 in connection with the use of less-lethal munitions during a 2020 protest, but the charges were dropped in 2023. Berry was confirmed after Democratic state senator Juan "Chuy" Hinojosa broke with other members of his party and joined Republican senators to provide Berry with the two-thirds majority needed to confirm his nomination.

During an August 2025 protest at the Texas Capitol, four demonstrators were arrested after refusing to leave the building. Eckhardt told reporters that she acted as the demonstrators' attorney "for the purposes of having gotten them out of jail." The demonstrators were released the following morning and were later barred from the Capitol grounds for one year.

=== Texas Comptroller ===
In October 2025, Eckhardt declared her candidacy for 10th congressional district in the 2026 election following the retirement of ten-term Republican incumbent Michael McCaul. On December 8, 2025, she withdrew from the race and announced her candidacy for the state comptroller instead. Eckhardt won the Democratic primary with 64.07% of the vote on March 6, 2026, setting her up to face off with Republican nominee and real estate developer Don Huffines in the November 3, 2026, general election.

== Electoral history ==
=== 2026 ===
General election Comptroller of Public Accounts
Party	Candidate	Votes	%	±%
Democratic	Sarah Eckhardt	5,014,496	51.3%	+10.4%
Republican	Don Huffines	4,511,185	46.2%	−10.4%
Libertarian	V. Alonzo Echavarria-Garza	185,187	1.9%	−0.8%
Green	Shehla Faizi	63,817	0.7%	+0.7%
Total votes		9,774,685	100.0	
Democratic gain from Republican				

Democratic primary election: Comptroller of Public Accounts
Party	Candidate	Votes	%
Democratic	Sarah Eckhardt	1,317,024	64.07
Democratic	Savant Moore	392,043	19.07
Democratic	Michael Lange	346,484	16.86
Total votes		2,055,551	100.00

=== 2024 ===
General election: Senate District 14
Party	Candidate	Votes	%
Democratic	Sarah Eckhardt (incumbent)	321,035	100.00
Total votes		321,035	100.00
Democratic hold			

=== 2022 ===
General election: Senate District 14
Party	Candidate	Votes	%
Democratic	Sarah Eckhardt (incumbent)	265,094	82.23
Libertarian	Steven E. Haskett	57,305	17.77
Total votes		322,399	100.00
Democratic hold			

=== 2020 ===
Special general glection: Senate District 14
Party	Candidate	Votes	%
Democratic	Sarah Eckhardt	60,531	49.74
Democratic	Eddie Rodriguez	41,202	33.86
Republican	Don Zimmerman	15,753	12.95
Republican	Walter Thomas Burns II	1,464	1.20
Libertarian	Jeff Ridgeway	1,410	1.16
Libertarian	Pat Dixon	1,323	1.09
Total votes		121,683	100.00
Democratic hold			

No candidate received a majority in the July 14 special election, with Sarah Eckhardt and Eddie Rodriguez advancing to a runoff. Rodriguez withdrew before the runoff, leaving Eckhardt elected to the seat.

=== 2018 ===
General election: Travis County Judge
Party	Candidate	Votes	%
Democratic	Sarah Eckhardt (incumbent)	350,949	100.00
Total votes		350,949	100.00
Democratic hold			

=== 2014 ===
General election: Travis County Judge
Party	Candidate	Votes	%
Democratic	Sarah Eckhardt	161,293	62.11
Republican	Mike McNamara	85,804	33.04
Libertarian	Richard Perkins	12,610	4.68
Total votes		259,707	100.00
Democratic hold			

Democratic primary election: Travis County Judge
Party	Candidate	Votes	%
Democratic	Sarah Eckhardt	25,544	55
Democratic	Andy Brown	20,896	45
Total votes		46,440	100

== Personal life ==
Eckhardt married attorney Kurt Sauer in 1998. They have two children, and divorced in 2016.

Party political offices
Preceded by Janet Dudding	Democratic nominee for Comptroller of Texas; 2026	Most recent
