= George H. Sheppard =

Texas State Comptroller (1874–1949)

George Hartfield Sheppard (November 4, 1874 - January 18, 1949) was Texas State Comptroller from 1930 until he died in office in 1949.

== Early life ==
Sheppard was born November 4, 1874, in Waco, Texas. The son of Andrew M. Sheppard and Sarah Hartfield, they left Waco for West Texas, where Sheppard was raised on a ranch.

He was educated in public schools around Abilene, Texas, and Ballinger, Texas, and in the summers, he attended normal institutes to be a schoolteacher. After graduation, he took a business course in Abilene, which prepared him for his later life. Sheppard also taught school in West Texas.

== Career in public service ==
In 1910, he was elected Tax Assessor of Nolan County, Texas. He held that post for eight years. During this time, he served as president of the Texas Tax Assessors Association. At the end of his term, he did not run for reelection and was appointed by Governor William P. Hobby to transfer auto licenses. When that position expired, Sheppard returned to Sweetwater, Texas, where he began working for city government.

He worked as Secretary for the Board of City Development and was later elected mayor. After his terms as mayor, Sheppard retired to the private sector where he worked in the general insurance business. In 1930, he was appointed State Comptroller by Governor Dan Moody. After his appointment Sheppard ran for election nine times and was almost always elected by a large majority. He was elected to every office he ever ran for.

Because of Mr. Sheppard's active interest in tax matters, he became widely recognized as an authority in the field of tax administration. He gave special attention to the gasoline tax, which was the most lucrative source of revenue in Texas. After he took office, the revenue from the gasoline tax increased from $32,000,000 in 1930 to $69,000,000 in 1946.

After Sheppard became Comptroller the Legislature enacted a law imposing a tax on cigarettes and placed the administration of it in the Comptroller's Department. Once the law was in place two problems arose: cigarette peddlers and cigarette tax stamp counterfeiters. The peddlers operated from bordering States under the protection of interstate commerce while the counterfeiters flooded the State with cigarette stamps.

The weak State Cigarette Tax Law had to be strengthened and in 1935, the Legislature, after adopting Sheppard's recommendations, amended the law.

Included in this amendment was the Use Tax Law, the first ever enacted in the United States. With the enactment of the new law, the fight with the two rings began. The validity of the new law was contested and a bitter struggle ensued. The case was carried before the Supreme Court of the United States, where the law was upheld.

So successful was the Cigarette Tax Law that in 1936 it was accepted as a model to be recommended to State legislatures throughout the United States by the National Tobacco Conference at Cincinnati.

A diligent administration of the Cigarette Tax Law of 1935 was constantly maintained and the annual revenue, which in 1934 amounted to $3,603,000, grew to $18,977,000 in 1946, and became one of the State's main tax items. The total revenue from all sources for 1946 was $301,521,177.75.

One of the most difficult tasks that confronted Sheppard was the establishment and implementation of an entirely new system of accounting and bookkeeping for the State. His work paid off when the State obtained its first perfect accounting system. Through the thorough and systematic performance of his duties, Sheppard had an excellent record as State Comptroller. His political philosophy of impartially enforcing the tax laws and staying out of politics helped Sheppard to succeed.

== Personal information ==
Sheppard was known as a quiet, soft-spoken family man with a wife and four daughters. He served on the Board of Stewards of the First Methodist Church in Austin. He was also a member of the Masons, belonging to the lodge, chapter and council at Sweetwater, and was identified there with the Benevolent and Protective Order of Elks.

George Hartfield Sheppard died of a heart attack while serving as State Comptroller. He was buried in the Texas State Cemetery in Austin, Texas.

== Sources ==
Party political offices
Preceded by Sam Houston Terrell	Democratic nominee for Texas Comptroller of Public Accounts; 1930, 1932, 1934, 1936, 1938, 1940, 1942, 1944, 1946, 1948	Succeeded by Robert S. Calvert
Political offices
Preceded by Sam Houston Terrell	Texas Comptroller of Public Accounts; 1930-1949	Succeeded by Robert S. Calvert
