= Kelly Hancock =

American politician (born 1963)

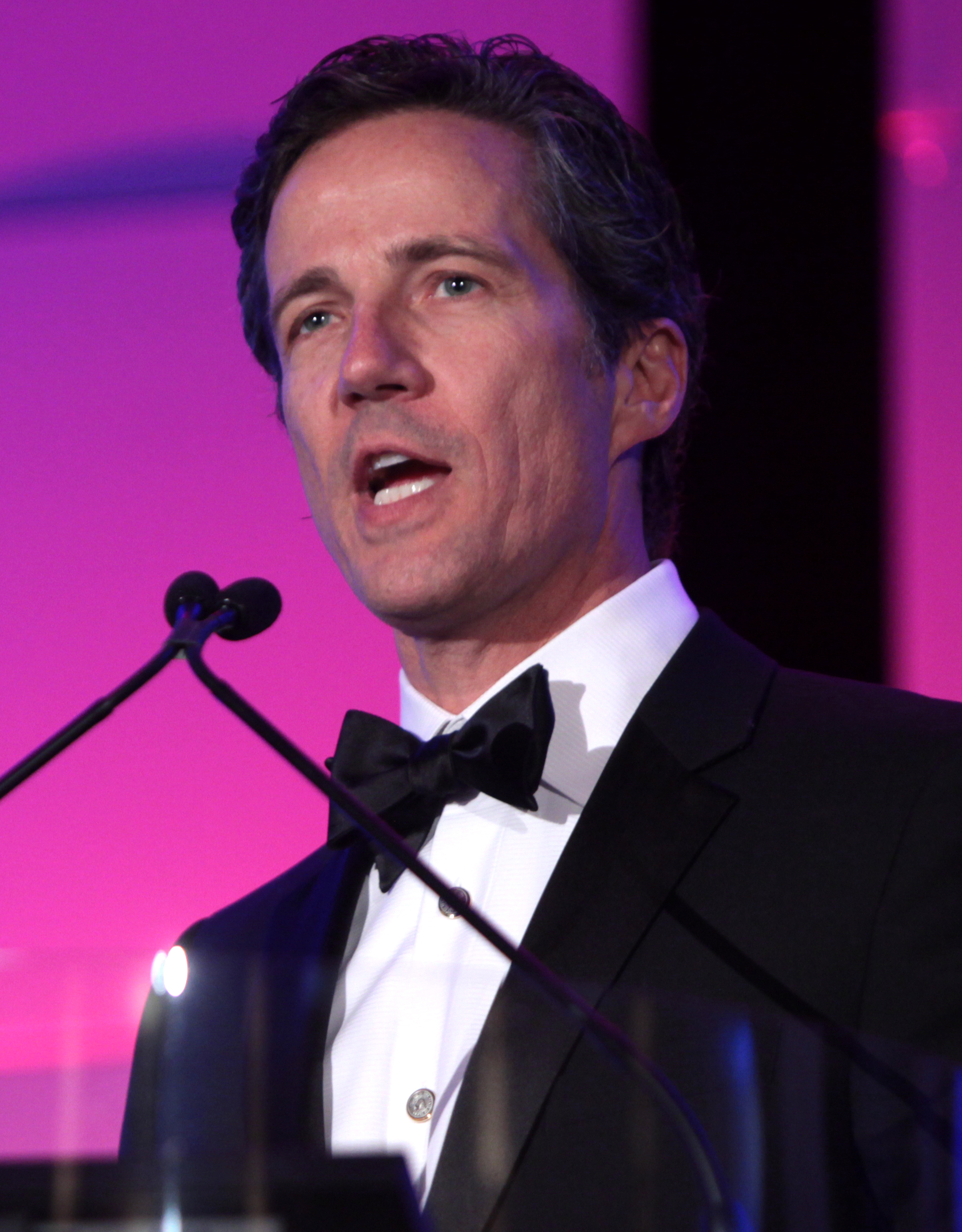
- Hancock in 2015

Comptroller of Texas
- Acting
- In office July 1, 2025 – July 31, 2026
- Governor: Greg Abbott
- Preceded by: Glenn Hegar
- Succeeded by: Don Huffines

President pro tempore of the Texas Senate
- In office January 10, 2023 – May 29, 2023
- Preceded by: Donna Campbell
- Succeeded by: Charles Schwertner

Member of the Texas Senate from the 9th district
- In office January 8, 2013 – June 18, 2025
- Preceded by: Chris Harris
- Succeeded by: Taylor Rehmet

Member of the Texas House of Representatives from the 91st district
- In office January 9, 2007 – January 7, 2013
- Preceded by: Bob Griggs
- Succeeded by: Stephanie Klick

Personal details
- Born: Kelly Gene Hancock; December 2, 1963 (age 62) Fort Worth, Texas, U.S.
- Party: Republican
- Education: Baylor University (BBA)

Kelly Gene Hancock (born December 2, 1963) is an American businessman and politician who served as the acting Texas Comptroller of Public Accounts from 2025 to 2026. A member of the Republican Party, he served in both chambers of the Texas Legislature from 2007 to 2025.

Hancock sought a full term in the 2026 Texas Comptroller of Public Accounts election, but lost in the Republican primary. After losing the primary, Hancock resigned from office before the end of his term.

== Early life, education, and career ==
A Fort Worth native, Hancock has resided his entire life in the Mid-Cities area of Tarrant County. In 2003, Hancock and his brother Cary founded Advanced Chemical Logistics, a chemical distribution company in Northeast Fort Worth.

Hancock graduated from Baylor University in Waco, Texas, in 1986 with a Bachelor of Business Administration.

== Political career ==
Hancock is a lifelong conservative who began his political career serving for thirteen years on the Birdville ISD school board. In 2006, he was elected to the first of three consecutive terms in the Texas House of Representatives for District 91.

=== Texas Senate ===
In the Texas Senate's 83rd Legislative Session of 2013, Hancock was tapped to serve on the following committees: Transportation, Jurisprudence, Business and Commerce, and Senate Administration. Hancock serves as the vice chairman of the Economic Development Committee.

In September 2013, Hancock announced his intent to run for a second term in the Senate.

Hancock was named one of the "Worst Legislators" in Texas by Texas Monthly magazine in 2017.

In 2021, Republicans in the Texas legislature drew heavily pro-Republican gerrymandered maps to vastly increase the number of safe Republican districts. Hancock's district, which had been a competitive district in the 2020 election, was redrawn to make it much more Republican.

Hancock was reelected to the state Senate in the general election held on November 6, 2018. With 132,001 votes (54.1 percent), he defeated his Democratic opponent, Gwenn Burud, who polled 112,113 (45.9 percent). His margin in Tarrant County was sufficient to overcome his loss in increasingly Democratic Dallas County.

==== Legislation ====
===== NCAA championship game in Arlington =====
In April 2013, Hancock authored Senate Bill 398, which ensured AT&T Stadium in Arlington would be eligible for state funds in the facility's pursuit of a BCS National Championship game in College Football. Governor Rick Perry signed the bill into law. AT&T Stadium hosted the inaugural College Football Playoff National Championship Game in 2015.

===== Voter fraud =====
In the 2017 special legislative session, Hancock spoke in support of a bill to increase the penalty from misdemeanor to felony when one is convicted of intentionally submitting false information on a mail-in ballot application. Hancock said mail-in voting has been targeted for illegal voting and election fraud and that the legislation is needed. Democrat Jose Menendez of San Antonio, however, argued against the legislation on grounds of "unintended consequences."

===== Delivery of alcoholic beverages =====
In 2019, Hancock co-sponsored a bill that was signed by governor Greg Abbott on June 12, 2019. Dealing with the sale and delivery of alcoholic beverages to private citizens, this law allows food establishments to sell and deliver alcohol along with food deliveries.

=== Texas Comptroller ===
On June 19, 2025, Hancock suddenly resigned from the Texas Senate in order to become chief clerk of the Texas Comptroller of Public Accounts office. His appointment to the role meant he became acting comptroller when Glenn Hegar resigned on July 1 to become chancellor of the Texas A&M System. By taking the chief clerk position - which did not require Senate confirmation - it allowed Greg Abbott to avoid violating a state law which stipulates "Senators — even former ones — cannot be appointed to another position that requires Senate confirmation during their term". The same day, he announced he would run for a full term in 2026 with Abbott and Hegar's endorsement. His opponents in the Republican Primary are Railroad Commissioner Christi Craddick and former State Senator Don Huffines.

In December 2025, Hancock filed a request for opinion with the Texas Attorney General's Office asking if his office could exclude schools linked to a “foreign terrorist organization” or a “foreign adversary” from the state's school voucher program. The move was seen as targeting schools with alleged affiliations with Muslim advocacy group Council on American–Islamic Relations, which Abbott had designated a terrorist organization in November 2025, or the Chinese Communist Party. Attorney general Ken Paxton issued a legal opinion confirming the Comptroller's power to exclude schools from the voucher program on this basis in January 2026.

On February 12, 2026, Hancock doubled the state's investment in Israel bonds to $280 million https://comptroller.texas.gov/about/media-center/news/20260212-acting-comptroller-kelly-hancock-doubles-texas-investment-in-israel-bonds-marking-largest-purchase-in-state-history-1770753243996

On March 3, 2026, he lost the Republican primary to former state Senator Don Huffines, who won with 57%. Hancock announced in July 2026 that he would be resigning from the office effective at the end of the month. This announcement was followed by another in which Greg Abbot said he was appointing Huffines to serve out the remainder of the term.

== Personal life ==
Hancock and his wife, Robin, live in North Richland Hills with their three children.

== Electoral history ==
=== 2022 ===
2022 Texas Senate election: Senate District 9
Party	Candidate	Votes	%	±%
Republican	Kelly Hancock (incumbent)	166,864	60.05	+6.02
Democratic	Gwenn Burud	111,019	39.95	−6.02
Total votes		277,883	100.0	
Republican hold				

=== 2018 ===
2018 Texas Senate election: Senate District 9
Party	Candidate	Votes	%	±%
Republican	Kelly Hancock (incumbent)	132,256	54.03	−11.03
Democratic	Gwenn Burud	112,537	45.97	+11.03
Total votes		244,793	100.0	
Republican hold				

=== 2014 ===
2014 Texas Senate election: Senate District 9
Party	Candidate	Votes	%	±%
Republican	Kelly Hancock (incumbent)	89,331	65.06	+6.71
Democratic	Gregory R. Perry	47,965	34.94	−3.27
Turnout		137,296		
Republican hold				

=== 2012 ===
2012 Texas Senate election: Senate District 9
Party	Candidate	Votes	%	±%
Republican	Kelly Hancock	136,288	58.35	+4.27
Democratic	Pete Martinez	89,255	38.21	−5.12
Libertarian	Dave (Mac) McElwee	8,034	3.44	+0.86
Turnout		233,577		
Republican hold				

Texas Senate
Preceded by Donna Campbell	President pro tempore of the Texas Senate; 2023	Succeeded by Charles Schwertner
Political offices
Preceded by Glenn Hegar	Comptroller of Texas; Acting; 2025–2026	Succeeded by Don Huffines
