= Sam Houston Terrell =

American politician (1891–1967)

Sam Houston Terrell (February 20, 1891 – August 17, 1967) was Texas State Comptroller from 1925 until 1930.

== Early life ==
Terrell was born outside Waco, Texas on February 20, 1891. He was the son of Henry Berryman Terrell and Virginia Weaver. His father served as Texas Comptroller of Public Accounts from 1915 - 1919. The Terrells were a large and active political family whose patriarch, and great-grandfather of Sam Houston Terrell, George W. Terrell had served in numerous roles in the Republic of Texas, including as Secretary of State of the Republic of Texas and a Justice of the Texas Supreme Court.

== Career in public service ==
Terrell was elected as a Democrat to the office of Comptroller of Public Accounts in 1924. He was re-elected in 1926 and 1928. In 1929, the 41st Legislature created the first "State Auditor and Efficiency Expert" position in Texas state government. In 1930, the State Auditor filed his first report with the legislature and made strong allegations of misconduct against a number of state officials. Terrell was singled out for the most allegations with 24 specific violations of law identified, including inadequate and improper accounting, refusal to secure approval for accounts before presenting them to the State Treasurer for payment, and misappropriation of public funds. As the investigation unfolded in the legislature, pressure mounted on Terrell to resign, which he did on February 25, 1930.

== Sources ==
Party political offices
Preceded by Lon A. Smith	Democratic nominee for Texas Comptroller of Public Accounts; 1924, 1926, 1928	Succeeded by George H. Sheppard
Political offices
Preceded by Lon A. Smith	Texas Comptroller of Public Accounts; 1925-1930	Succeeded by George H. Sheppard
