= John N. Leedom =

American politician

Member of the Texas Senate from the 16th district
- In office January 13, 1981 – March 19, 1996
- Preceded by: Bill Braecklein
- Succeeded by: John Carona

Personal details
- Born: John Nesbett Leedom; July 7, 1921 Dallas, Texas, U.S.
- Died: May 31, 2011 (aged 89) Dallas, Texas, U.S.
- Party: Republican
- Education: Rice University

John Nesbett Leedom (July 7, 1921 – May 31, 2011) was an American politician. A member of the Republican Party, he served in the Texas Senate from 1981 to 1996.

== Life and career ==
Leedom was born in Dallas, Texas. He attended and graduated from Highland Park High School. After graduating, he attended Rice University, earning his degree in electrical engineering in 1943, which after earning his degree, he served in the United States Navy during World War II. After his discharge, he served in the Dallas City Council from 1974 to 1980, and was chairman of the Dallas County Republican Party.

Leedom served in the Texas Senate from 1981 to 1996.

== Death ==
Leedom died at his home in Dallas, Texas on May 31, 2011, at the age of 89.
