= Chet Brooks =

American football player (1966–2026)

No. 31
- Position: Safety

Personal information
- Born: January 1, 1966; Midland, Texas, U.S.
- Died: January 16, 2026 (aged 60); Texas, U.S.
- Listed height: 5 ft 11 in (1.80 m)
- Listed weight: 191 lb (87 kg)

Career information
- High school: David W. Carter (Dallas, Texas)
- College: Texas A&M
- NFL draft: 1988: 11th round, 303rd overall pick

Career history
- San Francisco 49ers (1988–1990)

Awards and highlights
- 2× Super Bowl champion (XXIII, XXIV); Second-team All-SWC (1987)

Career NFL statistics
- Interceptions: 3
- Fumble recoveries: 2
- Sacks: 1
- Stats at Pro Football Reference

Terrance Donnell "Chet" Brooks (January 1, 1966 – January 16, 2026) was an American professional football player who a safety for three seasons with the San Francisco 49ers of the National Football League (NFL). He played college football for the Texas A&M Aggies

== Career ==
Brooks attended the Texas A&M University, where he coined the name "Wrecking Crew" for the Aggies' defense.

Brooks was selected by the San Francisco 49ers in the 11th round of the 1988 NFL draft with the 303rd overall pick. He started in Super Bowl XXIV. Brooks suffered a career-ending injury during the 49ers' game vs. the Green Bay Packers at Lambeau Field on November 4, 1990.

== Death ==
Brooks died from cancer on 16 January 2026, at the age of 60.
