= Texas Comptroller of Public Accounts =

Elected position in Texas, US

Comptroller of Public Accounts of Texas
- Incumbent; Don Huffines since August 1, 2026
- Style: The Honorable
- Term length: Four years, no term limits
- Inaugural holder: James B. Shaw; 1846
- Formation: Texas Constitution
- Salary: $153,750 (2019)
- Website: Official website

The Texas comptroller of public accounts is an executive branch position created by the Texas Constitution. The comptroller is popularly elected every four years, and is primarily tasked with collecting all state tax revenue and estimating the amount of revenue that the Texas Legislature can spend each biennium. The current comptroller is Don Huffines, who assumed office on August 1, 2026.

== History ==
=== Pre-statehood ===
The General Council of the Provisional Government of Texas created the Office of Comptroller of Public Accounts on December 29, 1835. The duty of the comptroller was to supervise the auditor of public accounts. On December 30, 1835, John H. Money became the first comptroller.

==== List of comptrollers pre-statehood ====
- John H. Money: 1835
- H.C. Hudson: (1836)
- Elisha M. Pease: (1837)
- Francis Richard Lubbock: (1837-1839)
- James Wright Simmons: (1839-1840)
- James B. Shaw: (1842-1846)

=== Post-statehood ===
The predecessor to the current comptroller's office started in 1846.

The longest-serving comptrollers in Texas history are Robert S. Calvert, who held the post for 26 consecutive years for an unprecedented twelve terms; George H. Sheppard, who served for 18 years over nine two-year terms; Bob Bullock, who served for 16 years for four four-year terms and later was notable as one of the most powerful lieutenant governors in Texas history (and the namesake for the state's official history museum) and Glenn Hegar held the fourth longest-serving tenure with 10 years.

Duties currently performed by the comptroller's office were previously divided between it and the office of Texas state treasurer; however, over time the Texas Legislature transferred most of the treasurer's functions to the comptroller's office. In 1850, the comptroller's office switched from legislative branch appointment to an elected office. The last state treasurer, Martha Whitehead, successfully campaigned for office in 1994 on the premise of abolishing the position and transferring its few remaining duties to the comptroller's office; upon winning she successfully campaigned the legislature for a Constitutional amendment in 1995 to formally abolish the treasurer's office which was approved by voters in November of that year. By 1996, the comptroller had taken over the treasurer's few remaining duties.

== Duties ==
The primary duties of the comptroller's office are to collect substantially all tax revenue owed to the State of Texas (this involves more than 60 different types of taxes from the sales tax—the largest source of the state's tax revenue, since Texas does not have a personal income tax—to minor items such as the "battery sales fee"—a $2–$3 fee on sales of lead-acid batteries) and to maintain the official financial records for the state. As Texas uses a unified collection system for sales taxes assessed by both state and local governments, the comptroller's office is responsible for collecting and remitting the local portion of this tax revenue to the various cities, counties, and special districts throughout the state. As a result, the Texas Comptroller of Public Accounts acts as a de facto state-level revenue agency.

The comptroller's office also operates the various prepaid college tuition funds operated by the state through its Prepaid Higher Education Tuition Board, provides reports on fiscal management and economic forecasts, and manages the unclaimed property fund.

As part of its fiscal management responsibilities under Article III, Section 49a of the Texas Constitution, the comptroller must certify to the Texas Legislature, prior to the beginning of the legislative session, the amount of available cash on hand and anticipated revenues (from all sources) for the next biennium (the two-year period beginning on September 1 of odd-numbered years and ending on August 31 two years thereafter; the certification is officially known as the Biennial Revenue Estimate or BRE). The Legislature is not permitted to appropriate any funds in excess of the comptroller's certified amounts (except in cases of emergency and then only with a four-fifths vote of both chambers), and absent the latter the comptroller is required to reject and return to the legislature any appropriation in violation of this requirement.

== List of Texas comptrollers ==
- James B. Shaw (D): 1846–1857
- Clement R. Johns (D): 1859–1864
- Willis L. Robards (D): 1865
- Albert H. Latimer (R): 1866
- Morgan Hamilton (R): 1867–1869
- Albert A. Bledsoe (R): 1870–1873
- Stephen Heard Darden (D): 1874–1879
- William M. Brown (D): 1880–1882
- William Jesse Swain (D): 1883–1886
- John D. McCall (D): 1887–1894
- Richard W. Finley (D): 1895–1900
- Robert M. Love (D): 1901–1903
- J. W. Stephen (D): 1903–1910
- W. P. Lane (D): 1911–1914
- Henry B. Terrell (D): 1915–1919
- M. L. Wiginton (D): 1920
- Lon A. Smith (D): 1921–1924
- Sam Houston Terrell (D): 1925–1930
- George H. Sheppard (D): 1930–1949
- Robert S. Calvert (D): 1949–1975
- Bob Bullock (D): 1975–1991
- John Sharp (D): 1991–1999
- Carole Keeton Strayhorn (R): 1999–2007
- Susan Combs (R): 2007–2015
- Glenn Hegar (R): 2015–2025
- Kelly Hancock (R) (acting): 2025–2026
- Don Huffines (R): 2026–2027
- Sarah Eckhardt (D) (elect)
