= Mike McKool Sr. =

American politician

Mike McKool Sr. (December 30, 1918 – February 22, 2003) was a soldier, lawyer and Texas State Senator. He was born in Mexico City and served as a senator from 1969 to 1973.
