= Keith Ellison (disambiguation) =

Keith Ellison (born 1963) is the Attorney General of Minnesota and former member of the U.S. Congress from Minnesota.

Keith Ellison may also refer to:

- Keith Ellison (American football) (born 1984), American football linebacker
- Keith P. Ellison (born 1950), U.S. federal judge
