= Judge Gee =

Judge Gee may refer to:

- Dolly Gee (born 1959), judge of the United States District Court for the Central District of California
- Thomas Gibbs Gee (1925–1994), judge of the United States Court of Appeals for the Fifth Circuit
