= Judge Jack =

Judge Jack may refer to:

- George W. Jack (1875–1924), judge of the United States District Court for the Western District of Louisiana
- Janis Graham Jack (born 1946), judge of the United States District Court for the Southern District of Texas
