= Houston Community College System v. Wilson =

- Supreme Court of the United States

Argued November 2, 2021 Decided March 24, 2022
- Full case name: Houston Community College System v. David Buren Wilson
- Docket no.: 20-804
- Citations: 595 U.S. 468 (more) 142 S. Ct. 1253, 212 L. Ed. 2d 303

Case history
- Prior: No. 18-CV-00744, 2019 WL 1317797 (S.D. Tex. Mar. 22, 2019)(dismissing complaint); 955 F.3d 490 (5th Cir. 2020)(reversing); 966 F.3d 341 (5th Cir. 2020)(denying rehearing en banc)

Holding
- A local government board member's freedom of speech was not abridged when he was verbally censured by his colleagues.

Court membership
- Chief Justice John Roberts Associate Justices Clarence Thomas · Stephen Breyer; Samuel Alito · Sonia Sotomayor; Elena Kagan · Neil Gorsuch; Brett Kavanaugh · Amy Coney Barrett

Case opinion
- Majority: Gorsuch, joined by unanimous

Laws applied
- U.S. Const. amend. I

Houston Community College System v. Wilson, 595 U.S. 468 (2022), is a United States Supreme Court case involving the First Amendment to the United States Constitution. The unanimous Court held that a local government board member's freedom of speech was not abridged when he was verbally censured by his colleagues.

== Background ==
David Buren Wilson was elected a member of the Houston Community College System's board in 2013. He was censured for repeated incidences of what other members of the Board of Trustees deemed to be behavior that was not becoming of an elected official or beneficial to the HCC system. Wilson filed suit in the United States District Court for the Southern District of Texas claiming that the censure was an offense to his First Amendment rights.

In March 2019, U.S. District Judge Kenneth M. Hoyt dismissed Wilson's complaint, finding that no right was violated so no injury was suffered. In April 2020, the United States Court of Appeals for the Fifth Circuit, reversed, with U.S. Circuit Judge W. Eugene Davis writing for the unanimous panel that Wilson had suffered "mental anguish" and criticizing the lower court for using out-of-circuit precedent. The Fifth Circuit then deadlocked 8-8 on whether to rehear en banc, with Circuit Judges Edith Jones and James C. Ho both writing dissents criticizing the panel for creating a circuit split.

== Supreme Court ==
Certiorari was granted in the case on April 26, 2021. The Court heard oral arguments on November 2, 2021, where an assistant to the Solicitor General of the United States appeared as a friend of the community college.

On March 24, 2022, the Supreme Court announced judgment in favor of the community college, unanimously voting to reverse the circuit court. Writing for the Court, Justice Neil Gorsuch found that Wilson's First Amendment rights were not violated by his fellow board members' censure of him because the censure did not result in any hindrance of his ability to exercise his free speech in his capacity as an elected official and member of the public. The opinion cites the fact that the use of censure by elected bodies to address the behavior and actions of their members is a practice with a long history in the United States, and it also states that the censure itself constitutes an exercise of First Amendment rights by Wilson's colleagues on the board who voted to reprimand him.
