= Judge Singleton =

Judge Singleton may refer to:

- John Virgil Singleton Jr. (1918–2015), judge of the United States District Court for the Southern District of Texas
- James K. Singleton (born 1939), judge of the United States District Court for the District of Alaska
