= Hilda G. Tagle =

American judge (born 1946)

Senior Judge of the United States District Court for the Southern District of Texas
- Incumbent
- Assumed office December 31, 2012

Judge of the United States District Court for the Southern District of Texas
- In office March 17, 1998 – December 31, 2012
- Appointed by: Bill Clinton
- Preceded by: Seat established by 104 Stat. 5089
- Succeeded by: Rolando Olvera

Personal details
- Born: December 18, 1946 (age 79) Corpus Christi, Texas, U.S.
- Education: Del Mar College (AA); East Texas State University (BA); North Texas State University (MS); University of Texas at Austin (JD)

Hilda Gloria Tagle (born December 18, 1946) is an inactive senior United States district judge of the United States District Court for the Southern District of Texas.

== Early life and education ==
Born in Corpus Christi, Texas, her last name is of Spanish and Arabic origins. Tagle was raised in a small South Texas town called Robstown. Tagle is the eldest of five children. She has four younger brothers who currently reside in Corpus Christi. She was raised Catholic by her mother and attended church with her mother on a regular basis. She enjoyed reading books at an early age and spent most of her time in the local library. Her advanced reading skills allowed her to skip the second grade. Hilda's mother encouraged her to become a licensed beautician at the age of sixteen. Hilda never worked as a beautician. Her desire was to attend and excel in college. In 1965, she enrolled at Del Mar College after she graduated from high school. She received her Associate's of Art degree in 1967. Two years later she received a Bachelor of Arts degree from East Texas State University where she decided to become a full-time librarian. Her passion for reading helped her decide her career decision. After graduating from East Texas, she decided to move to North Texas and start graduate school there. She received a Master of Science from North Texas State University in 1971, and worked as a professor at a Jesuit school in Houston Texas. In the summer 1975, she decided to attend law school and began studying at the University of Texas in Austin. She finished law school in twenty-seven months graduating in 1977.

== Legal career ==
In 1977, she returned to Corpus Christi where she worked as an assistant county attorney. She was a law clerk for the Legal Aid Society of Central Texas. A year later she was an assistant county attorney of Nueces County Attorney's Office. In 1980, she was again selected by the Nueces County District Attorney to try felonies. After working for the District Attorney's office, she began teaching at Del Mar College from 1981 to 1985. In 1985, she became the first Hispanic female judge in Nueces County and the first Hispanic female county court at law judge in Texas. In addition, Tagle was one of the first females to try criminal jury cases. She was also the second Hispanic female judge in the state of Texas. Tagle was selected by Governor Ann Richards to the Governor's Commission for Women. She was involved in several civic activities. She was the founding chair member of the Mexican American Bar of the Coastal Bend, the Corpus Christi Bar Association and the Hispanic Women's Network. Tagle also won a Distinguished Alumni Award in 2012. Tagle recently received the 2017 Sarah T. Hughes Woman's Lawyers of Achievement Award.

== Judicial service ==
=== State judicial service ===
Tagle was a judge on the Nueces County Court, at Law No. 3, Texas from 1985 to 1994. She was a judge on the 148th District Court, Texas from 1995 to 1998.

=== Federal judicial service ===
Tagle was nominated by President Bill Clinton on August 10, 1995 to a new seat created by 104 Stat. 5089 and her nomination lapsed. She was renominated on March 21, 1997 and confirmed by the United States Senate on March 11, 1998. She received her commission on March 17, 1998. She assumed senior status on December 31, 2012, and inactive senior status on December 31, 2021.

== See also ==
- List of Hispanic and Latino American jurists
- List of first women lawyers and judges in Texas

Legal offices
Preceded by Seat established by 104 Stat. 5089	Judge of the United States District Court for the Southern District of Texas; 1998–2012	Succeeded by Rolando Olvera
