= Waller Thomas Burns =

American judge

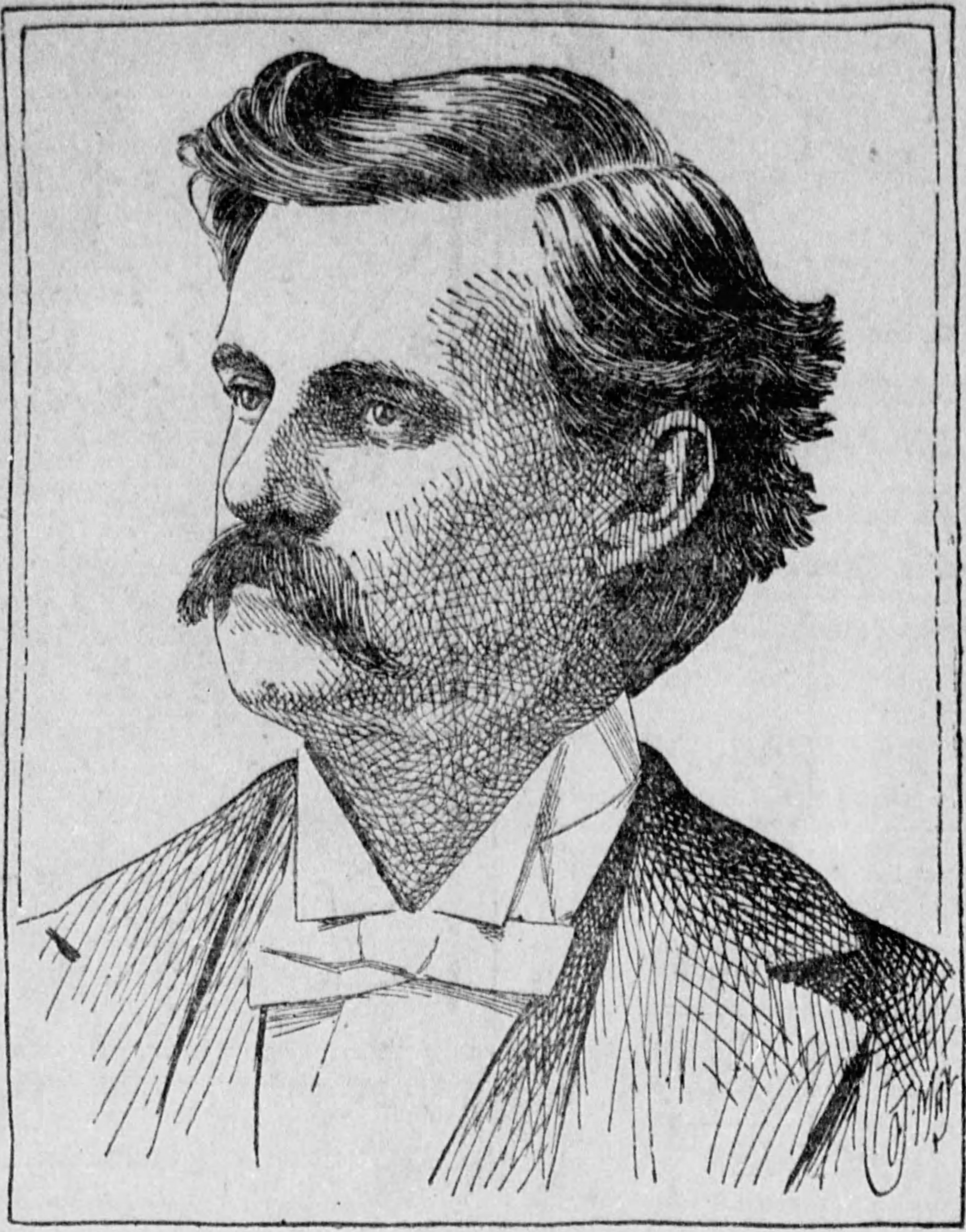

Judge of the United States District Court for the Southern District of Texas
- In office April 22, 1902 – November 17, 1917
- Appointed by: Theodore Roosevelt
- Preceded by: Seat established by 32 Stat. 64
- Succeeded by: Joseph Chappell Hutcheson Jr.

Member of the Texas Senate
- In office 1897-1901

Personal details
- Born: Waller Thomas Burns; January 14, 1858 La Grange, Texas
- Died: November 17, 1917 (aged 59) Laredo, Texas

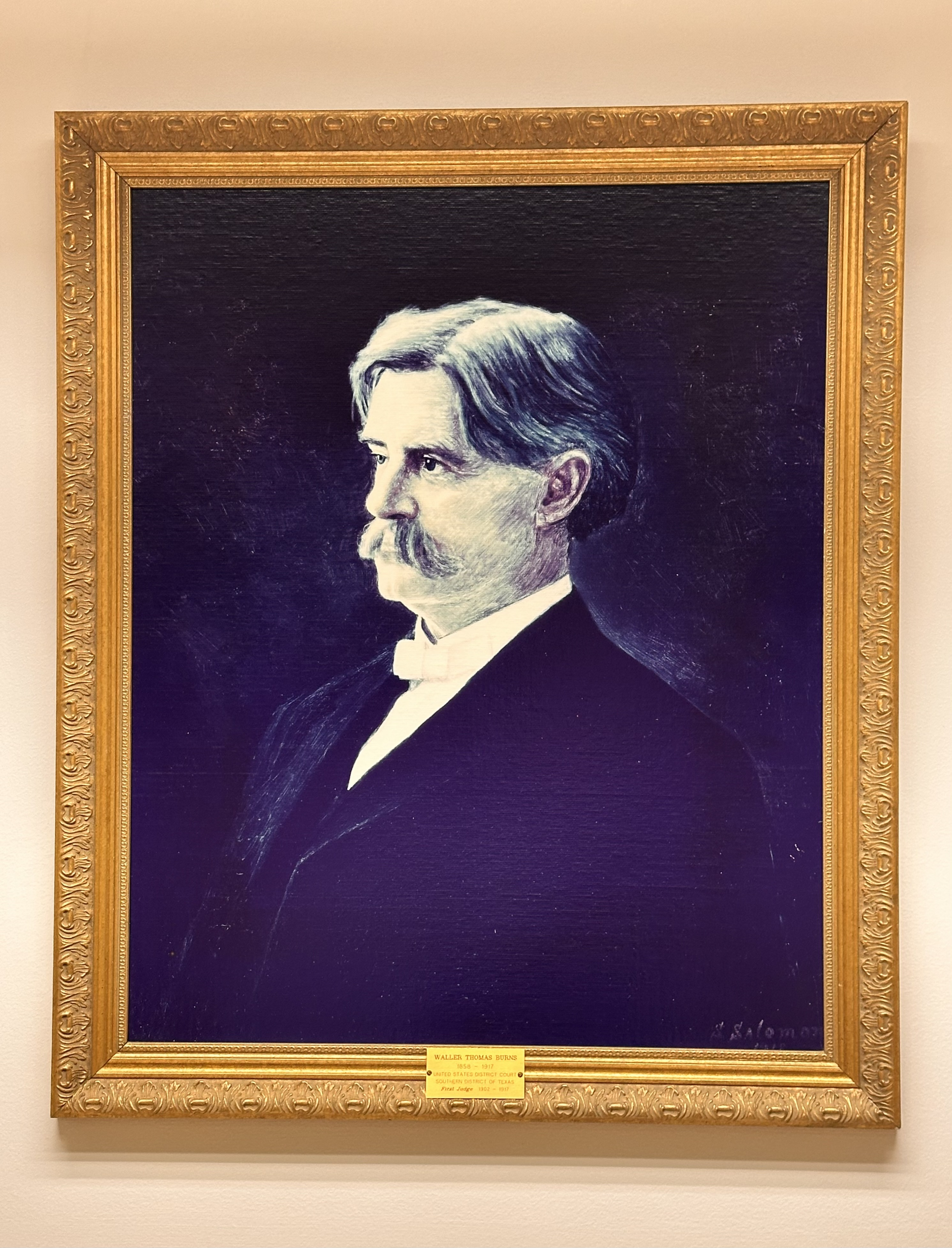
Waller Thomas Burns’ portrait in the 11th floor hallway of the Bob Casey Federal Building in Houston, Texas.

Waller Thomas Burns (January 14, 1858 – November 17, 1917) was a United States district judge of the United States District Court for the Southern District of Texas.

== Career ==
Born in La Grange, Texas, Burns was in the United States Customs Service before entering private practice in Galveston, Texas from 1882 to 1888. He became counsel to the Houston & Texas Central Railroad in 1888, and was a member of the Texas Senate from 1897 to 1901.

== Federal judicial service ==
Burns was nominated by President Theodore Roosevelt on April 12, 1902, to the United States District Court for the Southern District of Texas, to a new seat authorized by 32 Stat. 64. He was confirmed by the United States Senate on April 24, 1902, and received his commission on April 22, 1902. (Note: This is the date given by FJC Bio, but is clearly incorrect, as the commission date must be on or subsequent to the confirmation date. The Congressional Record for April 24, 1902, confirms the confirmation date as given by FJC Bio.) His service terminated on November 17, 1917, due to his death in Laredo, Texas.

== Sources ==
Legal offices
Preceded by Seat established by 32 Stat. 64	Judge of the United States District Court for the Southern District of Texas; 1902–1917	Succeeded by Joseph Chappell Hutcheson Jr.
