= Franklin D. Roosevelt Supreme Court candidates =

During his twelve years in office, President Franklin D. Roosevelt appointed eight new members of the Supreme Court of the United States: Associate Justices Hugo Black, Stanley F. Reed, Felix Frankfurter, William O. Douglas, Frank Murphy, James F. Byrnes, Robert H. Jackson, and Wiley Blount Rutledge. Additionally, he elevated sitting Justice Harlan F. Stone to chief justice. Roosevelt's nine nominations filled eight seats on the Supreme Court because Byrnes resigned while Roosevelt was still in office. Roosevelt nominated Rutledge to the seat vacated by Byrnes.

== First term without vacancy ==
During his first term, Roosevelt did not fill a single Supreme Court vacancy, and the court, led by the "Four Horsemen" of Willis Van Devanter, James Clark McReynolds, George Sutherland and Pierce Butler, struck down many of his New Deal programs. One of Roosevelt's most severe political defeats during his presidency was the failure of the Judicial Procedures Reform Bill of 1937, popularly known as the court-packing bill, which sought to stack a hostile Supreme Court in his favor by adding more associate justices.

== Hugo Black nomination ==
Soon after this setback, however, Roosevelt obtained his first opportunity to appoint a Supreme Court justice when conservative Van Devanter retired. Roosevelt wanted the replacement to be a "thumping, evangelical New Dealer" who was reasonably young, confirmable by the Senate, and from a region of the country unrepresented on the court. The three final candidates were Solicitor General Stanley Forman Reed, Indiana Senator Sherman Minton, and Alabama Senator Hugo Black. Roosevelt said Reed "had no fire", and Minton didn't want the appointment at the time. Black was a candidate from the South who as a senator had voted for all twenty-four of Roosevelt's major New Deal programs, and had been an outspoken advocate of the court-packing plan. Roosevelt admired Black's use of the investigative role of the Senate to shape the American mind on reforms, his strong voting record, and his early support, which dated back to 1933.

On August 12, 1937, Roosevelt nominated Black to fill the vacancy. For the first time since 1853, the Senate departed from its tradition, which had been to confirm the appointment of a sitting senator without debate. Instead, it referred the nomination to the Judiciary Committee. Black faced scrutiny from his fellow senators and Newsweek for his alleged bigotry, his cultural roots, and later when it became public, his Ku Klux Klan membership, but the committee recommended Black's confirmation by a vote of 13–4 on August 16.

The next day, the full Senate considered Black's nomination. Rumors relating to Black's involvement in the Ku Klux Klan surfaced among the senators, and Democratic Senators Royal S. Copeland and Edward R. Burke urged the Senate to defeat the nomination. However, no conclusive evidence of Black's involvement was available at the time, so after six hours of debate, the Senate voted 63–16 to confirm Black; ten Republicans and six Democrats voted against Black. He resigned from the Senate and was sworn in as an associate justice two days later; Black would later explain that the haste in resigning was to avoid fallout from his Klan membership potentially going public.

== Stanley Reed nomination ==
On January 5, 1938, 75-year-old Associate Justice George Sutherland announced he would retire from the Supreme Court as of January 18. On January 15, 1938, Roosevelt nominated Solicitor General Stanley F. Reed, who had been considered for the previous vacancy. Many in the nation's capital worried about the nomination fight, in light of the difficulty encountered by Hugo Black. However, Reed's nomination was swift and generated little debate in the Senate. He was confirmed on January 25, 1938, by voice vote, and seated as an associate justice on January 31. As of 2025, Reed is the most recent person to serve as a Supreme Court justice without possessing a law degree.

== Felix Frankfurter nomination ==
Following the death of Supreme Court Justice Benjamin N. Cardozo in July 1938, President Roosevelt asked his old friend Felix Frankfurter for recommendations of prospective candidates for the vacancy. Finding none on the list to suit his criteria, Roosevelt nominated Frankfurter himself on January 5, 1939. Frankfurter was confirmed by the Senate on January 17, 1939, by voice vote.

== William O. Douglas nomination ==
In 1939, Justice Louis D. Brandeis retired from the Supreme Court, and Roosevelt nominated Douglas as his replacement on March 20, 1939. Douglas later revealed that this had been a great surprise to him—Roosevelt had summoned him to an "important meeting", and Douglas feared that he was to be named as the chairman of the Federal Communications Commission. Douglas was Brandeis' personal choice as his successor. He was confirmed by the Senate on April 4 by a vote of 62 to 4. The four negative votes were cast by four Republicans: Lynn J. Frazier, Henry Cabot Lodge Jr., Gerald P. Nye, and Clyde M. Reed. Douglas was sworn into office on April 17, 1939.

== Frank Murphy nomination ==
Justice Pierce Butler died in 1939, creating the next vacancy on the court. Butler was a Catholic, and held a seat traditionally filled by a Catholic justice. On January 4, 1940, Roosevelt maintained the tradition of a Catholic seat when he nominated Frank Murphy. Murphy was confirmed by the Senate on January 16, 1940, by voice vote.

== Harlan F. Stone, James Byrnes, and Robert H. Jackson nominations ==
On January 31, 1941, James Clark McReynolds, soon to be 80 years old, stepped down from the court, followed within a few months by the retirement of Chief Justice Charles Evans Hughes, also nearly 80. On June 12, 1941, Roosevelt nominated Associate Justice Harlan F. Stone to be chief justice. That same day, Roosevelt also nominated James F. Byrnes, and Robert H. Jackson to the court, with Byrnes to succeed McReynolds and Jackson to fill the associate justice seat to be vacated by the elevation of Stone. Byrnes was confirmed by the Senate on the same day by voice vote. Stone was confirmed on June 27, 1941, and Jackson on July 7, 1941, both also by voice vote.

== Wiley Rutledge nomination ==
Byrnes only served on the court for a year and a half, resigning at Roosevelt's behest to head the powerful Office of Economic Stabilization. On January 11, 1943, Roosevelt nominated Wiley Rutledge to fill the vacancy. Rutledge was confirmed by the Senate on February 8, 1943, by voice vote.

== Names mentioned ==
Following is a list of individuals who were mentioned in various news accounts and books as having been considered by Roosevelt for a Supreme Court appointment:

=== United States Supreme Court (elevation to chief justice) ===
- Harlan F. Stone (1872–1946) (nominated and confirmed)

=== United States Courts of Appeals ===

- Court of Appeals for the Third Circuit
  - Herbert F. Goodrich (1879–1962)
- Court of Appeals for the Fifth Circuit
  - Joseph Chappell Hutcheson, Jr. (1879–1973)
  - Samuel H. Sibley (1873–1958)
- Court of Appeals for the Tenth Circuit
  - Sam G. Bratton (1888–1963)
- Court of Appeals for the D.C. Circuit
  - Wiley Blount Rutledge Jr. (1894–1949) (nominated and confirmed)
  - Harold Montelle Stephens (1886–1955)

=== State supreme courts ===
- Walter P. Stacy (1884–1951) – chief justice, North Carolina Supreme Court

=== Executive branch officials ===
- Homer S. Cummings (1870–1956) – United States attorney general
- William O. Douglas (1898–1980) – chairman, Securities and Exchange Commission (nominated and confirmed)
- Robert H. Jackson (1892–1954) – attorney general (nominated and confirmed)
- Frank Murphy (1890–1949) – attorney general (nominated and confirmed)
- Stanley Forman Reed (1884–1980) – United States solicitor general (nominated and confirmed)

=== United States senators ===
- Hugo L. Black (1886–1971) – senator from Alabama (nominated and confirmed)
- James F. Byrnes (1879–1972) – senator from South Carolina (nominated and confirmed)
- Hiram W. Johnson (1866–1945) – senator from California; former governor of California
- Sherman Minton (1890–1965) – senator from Indiana (nominated by Harry S. Truman in 1949 and confirmed)
- Joseph T. Robinson (1872–1937) – senator from Arkansas
- Lewis B. Schwellenbach (1894–1948) – senator from Washington

=== Academics ===
- Felix Frankfurter (1882–1965) – professor, Harvard Law School (nominated and confirmed)
- Lloyd K. Garrison (1897–1991) – dean, University of Wisconsin Law School

== See also ==
- United States federal judge
- Judicial appointment history for United States federal courts
