= Alfred H. Bennett =

American judge (born 1965)

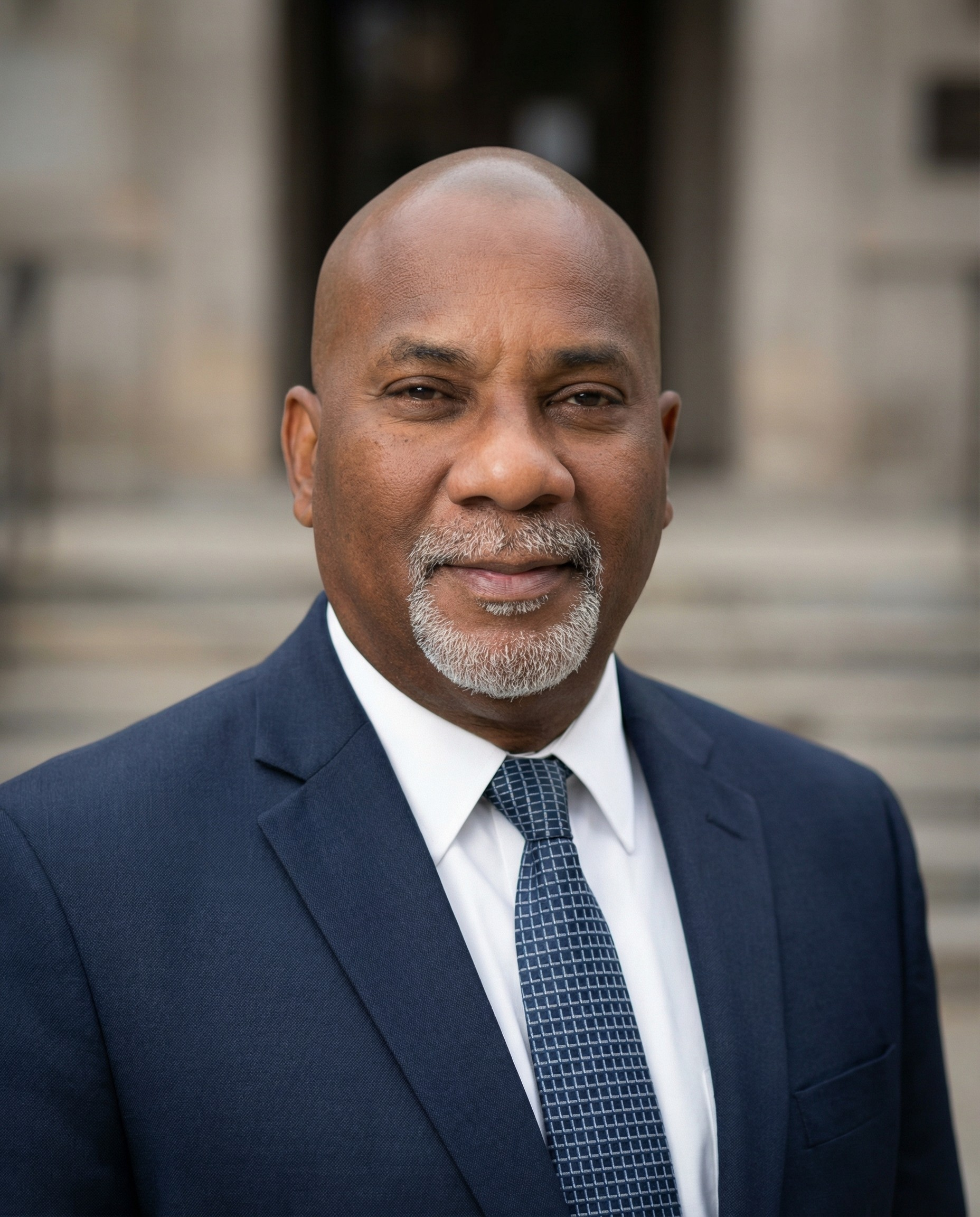

Judge of the United States District Court for the Southern District of Texas
- Incumbent
- Assumed office April 15, 2015
- Appointed by: Barack Obama
- Preceded by: Kenneth M. Hoyt

Personal details
- Born: Alfred Homer Bennett; April 1965 (age 61) Ennis, Texas, U.S.
- Party: Democratic
- Education: University of Houston (BS); University of Texas at Austin (JD)

Alfred Homer Bennett (born April 1965) is a United States district judge of the United States District Court for the Southern District of Texas.

== Early life and education ==
Alfred H. Bennett was born in Ennis, Texas. He earned a Bachelor of Science degree in Political Science from the University of Houston in 1988 and a Juris Doctor from the University of Texas School of Law in 1991.

== Legal career ==
Following law school, Bennett practiced law in Houston, Texas. He began his career as an associate at Fulbright & Jaworski L.L.P. from 1991 to 1994, and later at Solar & Fernandes, L.L.P. from 1994 to 1998. From 1998 to 2008, he operated a solo legal practice, representing individuals and corporate clients in litigation matters before both state and federal courts. During this period, Bennett also completed a 40-hour basic mediation training program through the A.A. White Dispute Resolution Center at the University of Houston in 2007.

In addition to private practice, Bennett was active in legal education. From 2003 to 2013, he served as an adjunct professor at the Thurgood Marshall School of Law, where he taught trial advocacy.

From 2009 to 2015, Bennett served as the presiding judge of the 61st Civil District Court of Texas in Harris County. While on the state bench, he also served as the administrative judge for the Harris County Civil District Courts from 2010 to 2011.

=== Federal judicial service ===
On September 18, 2014, President Barack Obama nominated Bennett to serve as a United States district judge for the Southern District of Texas, to the seat vacated by Judge Kenneth M. Hoyt, who assumed senior status on March 2, 2013. On December 16, 2014, Bennett's nomination was returned to the President due to the sine die adjournment of the 113th Congress. On January 7, 2015, President Obama renominated him to the same position. Bennett received a hearing before the Judiciary Committee on January 21, 2015. On February 26, 2015, his nomination was reported out of committee by voice vote. On April 13, 2015, the United States Senate confirmed Bennett by a 95–0 vote.

== Notable Cases ==
=== Transgender Prisoner Mistreatment Case (2016) ===
In Zollicoffer v. Livingston, a transgender prisoner brought a § 1983 action against the Executive Director of the Texas Department of Criminal Justice, alleging Eighth Amendment violations for failing to protect her from sexual assault by other inmates. Bennett acknowledged the “horrific series of assaults, rapes, and abuses” were enough to “offend even the sternest of dispositions,” deferred ruling on whether the director was protected by qualified immunity, and ordered discovery on the issue. The case later settled.

=== International Kidnapping Case of a Minor (2018) ===
In USA v. Guimaraes, Bennett presided over a 10-day jury trial in which a Brazilian couple was convicted of the international kidnapping of their grandson. Bennett ordered a sentence below the guidelines while acknowledging “[t]here is no sentence I can impose that will resolve this family fracture.”

=== Public Corruption Case (2019) ===
In USA v. Delgado, Bennett sentenced Rodolfo Delgado, a Texas state district judge, to 60 months in prison for conspiracy, bribery, and obstructing justice. At sentencing, Bennett stated that “such criminal actions will not be tolerated, least of all from individuals conferred with the public trust.”

=== Houston Busking Case (2022) ===
In Barilla v. City of Houston, Bennett resolved a dispute between a street performer and the City of Houston by determining the city’s busking and permit ordinances were unconstitutional. The Houston City Council unanimously rescinded the ordinances the following year.

=== Fourth Amendment Use-of-Force Case (2022-2025) ===
In Barnes v. Felix, Bennett presided over a Fourth Amendment suit brought on behalf of Ashtian Barnes, who was shot and killed by law enforcement during a traffic stop. In granting summary judgment to law enforcement, Bennett explained he was “duty bound” by the Fifth Circuit’s “moment of threat” doctrine to focus his analysis on only the two seconds before Barnes was shot. He added, however, that a “more robust examination” would have helped him assess the reasonableness of the shooting.

The case went up to the Supreme Court. There, a unanimous Court vacated judgment, remanded to the Fifth Circuit, and recognized that a district court “cannot review the totality of the circumstances if it has to put on chronological blinders.”

== Professional affiliations ==
In addition to his judicial service, Bennett has been actively involved in professional, civic, and community organizations, with a particular focus on access to justice, legal administration, and community development. From 2011 to 2015, Bennett served on the Texas Access to Justice Commission and chaired its Strategic Planning Committee, contributing to statewide initiatives to improve access to civil legal services.

Bennett’s professional affiliations further include involvement with national, state, and local legal organizations, including the National Bar Association, the State Bar of Texas, the Texas Bar College, the Texas Young Lawyers' Association, the Houston Bar Association, and the Houston Lawyers Association.

Bennett remains actively engaged with alumni organizations of the University of Houston and the University of Texas School of Law.

Bennett is a Life Member of Alpha Phi Alpha fraternity.

== Awards and recognition ==
- Distinguished Alumni Award, University of Houston Alumni Association (2024).
- Distinguished Alumni of the Year, Thurgood Marshall Legal Society (2019–2020).
- Service to the Legal Community Award, The Spouses of Houston Barristers (2017).
- The Joyce M. Reynolds Lifetime Achievement Award, Houston Community College (2016).
- Honorary Order of the Coif, University of Texas School of Law (2015).
- Outstanding Service in the Community, Mexican American Bar Association Foundation (2015).
- Father of the Year, Houston Chapter of Jack and Jill of America (2015).
- Weldon Berry Judicial Service Award, Houston Lawyers Association (May 2014).
- WEBELOS Leader of the Year, Boy Scouts of America, Sam Houston Area Council, W. L. Davis District (2013).
- Community Leader Award, Texas Women’s Empowerment Foundation (2011).
- Rated “AV” (very high to preeminent legal ability), Martindale-Hubbell Legal Directory (2001).
- President’s Achievement Award, Houston Lawyers Association (1998).
- Distinguished Service Award, Thurgood Marshall Legal Society (1990).

== See also ==
- List of African-American federal judges
- List of African-American jurists

Legal offices
Preceded by Kenneth M. Hoyt	Judge of the United States District Court for the Southern District of Texas; 2015–present	Incumbent
