= Woodrow Bradley Seals =

American judge

Senior Judge of the United States District Court for the Southern District of Texas
- In office December 25, 1982 – October 27, 1990

Judge of the United States District Court for the Southern District of Texas
- In office July 23, 1966 – December 25, 1982
- Appointed by: Lyndon B. Johnson
- Preceded by: Seat established by 80 Stat. 75
- Succeeded by: Ricardo Hinojosa

Personal details
- Born: Woodrow Bradley Seals; December 24, 1917 Bogalusa, Louisiana
- Died: October 27, 1990 (aged 72) Houston, Texas
- Education: University of Texas School of Law (LLB)

Woodrow Bradley Seals (December 24, 1917 – October 27, 1990) was a United States district judge of the United States District Court for the Southern District of Texas.

== Education and career ==
Born in Bogalusa, Louisiana, Seals was a major in the United States Army Air Forces from 1941 to 1946, and was thereafter a lieutenant colonel in the United States Air Force Reserve. He received a Bachelor of Laws from the University of Texas School of Law in 1949, entering private practice in Houston, Texas from 1949 to 1961. He was United States Attorney for the Southern District of Texas from 1961 to 1966.

== Federal judicial service ==
On June 28, 1966, Seals was nominated by President Lyndon B. Johnson to a new seat on the United States District Court for the Southern District of Texas created by 80 Stat. 75. He was confirmed by the United States Senate on July 22, 1966, and received his commission on July 23, 1966. He assumed senior status on December 25, 1982, serving in that capacity until his death on October 27, 1990, in Houston.

== Honor ==
In addition to judicial work, Seals gained notice as a humanitarian and shared the World Methodist Peace Award for 1987.

Legal offices
Preceded by Seat established by 80 Stat. 75	Judge of the United States District Court for the Southern District of Texas; 1966–1982	Succeeded by Ricardo Hinojosa
