= Norman William Black =

American judge (1931–1997)

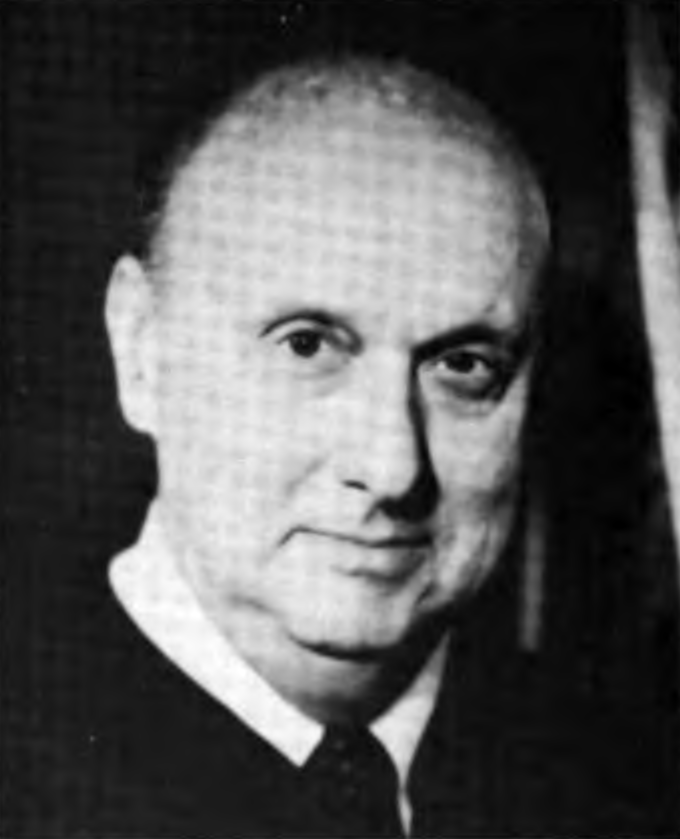

Senior Judge of the United States District Court for the Southern District of Texas
- In office December 6, 1996 – July 23, 1997

Chief Judge of the United States District Court for the Southern District of Texas
- In office 1992–1996
- Preceded by: James DeAnda
- Succeeded by: George P. Kazen

Judge of the United States District Court for the Southern District of Texas
- In office May 11, 1979 – December 6, 1996
- Appointed by: Jimmy Carter
- Preceded by: Seat established by 92 Stat. 1629
- Succeeded by: Keith P. Ellison

Magistrate Judge of the United States District Court for the Southern District of Texas
- In office 1976 – May 11, 1979

Personal details
- Born: Norman William Black; December 6, 1931 Houston, Texas, U.S.
- Died: July 23, 1997 (aged 65) Silverthorne, Colorado, U.S.
- Education: University of Texas at Austin (BBA, LLB)

Norman William Black (December 6, 1931 – July 23, 1997) was a United States district judge of the United States District Court for the Southern District of Texas.

== Education and career ==
Black was born in Houston, Texas and graduated from San Jacinto High School. He received a Bachelor of Business Administration from the University of Texas at Austin in 1953 and a Bachelor of Laws from the University of Texas School of Law in 1955. He was in private practice in Houston in 1955. He was in the United States Army Military Police from 1955 to 1957, where he was stationed in Berlin, Germany and became a specialist 4th class. He was then a law clerk to Judge Ben Clarkson Connally of the Southern District of Texas from 1957 to 1958. Black was an Assistant United States Attorney in Houston from 1958 to 1960, returning to private practice in Houston until 1976. He was also an adjunct professor at the University of Houston Law Center from 1970 to 1975, and the South Texas College of Law from 1975 to 1997.

== Federal judicial service ==
Black served as a United States magistrate judge for the Southern District of Texas from 1976 to 1979. On February 23, 1979, Black was nominated by President Jimmy Carter to a new seat on the United States District Court for the Southern District of Texas created by 92 Stat. 1629. Black was confirmed by the United States Senate on May 10, 1979, and received his commission on May 11, 1979. He was a Judge in residence at the University of Cincinnati in 1989. He served as Chief Judge from 1992 to 1996, assuming senior status on December 6, 1996 and serving in that capacity until his death, on July 23, 1997, in Silverthorne, Colorado.

== See also ==
- List of Jewish American jurists

== Sources ==
Legal offices
Preceded by Seat established by 92 Stat. 1629	Judge of the United States District Court for the Southern District of Texas; 1979–1996	Succeeded by Keith P. Ellison
Preceded by James DeAnda	Chief Judge of the United States District Court for the Southern District of Texas; 1992–1996	Succeeded by George P. Kazen
