= David Hittner =

American judge (born 1939)

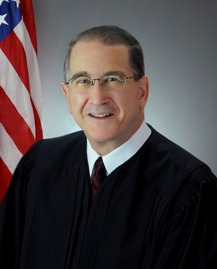

Senior Judge of the United States District Court for the Southern District of Texas
- Incumbent
- Assumed office November 11, 2004

Judge of the United States District Court for the Southern District of Texas
- In office June 9, 1986 – November 11, 2004
- Appointed by: Ronald Reagan
- Preceded by: George Edward Cire
- Succeeded by: Micaela Alvarez

Personal details
- Born: July 10, 1939 (age 87) Schenectady, New York, U.S.
- Education: New York University (BS, JD)

David Hittner (born July 10, 1939) is a senior United States district judge of the United States District Court for the Southern District of Texas. He also has served by temporary assignment on the United States Court of Appeals for the Fifth Circuit, as well as the U.S. District Courts for the Southern District of New York and the District of Arizona. His tenure as a federal judge began in 1986, when he was nominated for the lifetime position by President Ronald Reagan and unanimously confirmed by the United States Senate. Prior to his appointment to the federal bench in 1986, Hittner served from 1978 to 1986 as the elected judge of the 133rd Judicial District Court of Harris County, Texas, based in Houston.

== Early life ==
Hittner was born in Schenectady, New York, but moved with his family to Brooklyn, New York when he was a year old. His father, J. George Hittner, was an electrician and a member of the Masons fraternal service organization. His mother, Sophie Moskowitz Hittner, was a bookkeeper and homemaker. Hittner was a Boy Scout, earning 81 merit badges and attaining Eagle Scout rank. He followed his hometown team, the Brooklyn Dodgers, and met his childhood hero, Jackie Robinson, the first African-American to play major league baseball.

== Education, military service and early career ==
Hittner received his undergraduate degree from New York University, serving as the president of his graduating class. Hittner received his Juris Doctor degree from New York University School of Law. He passed the New York bar exam, and served two years in the Army as an infantry captain and paratrooper. Hittner then moved to Houston to pursue his legal career.

After passing the Texas bar, Hittner joined a private firm, gaining expertise in litigation and courtroom procedure. Hittner also developed an interest in family law and in 1975 was among the first class of Texas lawyers certified as family law specialists.

== Judicial career ==
=== State court service ===
Hittner twice campaigned for election to judgeships in Harris County's Courts of Domestic Relations. Those races were unsuccessful, but in 1978 Democratic Texas Governor Dolph Briscoe appointed Hittner to the 133rd Judicial District Court of Harris County. He subsequently won election twice, serving until 1986.

=== Federal judicial service ===
On April 22, 1986, President Reagan nominated Hittner to succeed Judge George Edward Cire on the United States District Court for the Southern District of Texas. Hittner was confirmed by the U. S. Senate on June 6, 1986, and he received his commission on June 9, 1986. He assumed senior status on November 11, 2004, and initially maintained a full-time caseload. In addition to his regular duties as a state and federal judge, Hittner became an expert in summary judgments, a teacher and a mentor. From 1981 until 2007, he conducted a continuing legal education program for state and federal court practitioners entitled "Saturday Morning in Court", with the focus on the critical minutiae of trial practice. The program prompted a laudatory note from Chief Justice Warren Burger, who recalled overseeing a similar project early in his legal career. Hittner has been an adjunct professor at South Texas College of Law Houston.

=== Notable cases ===
Hittner was a member of a three-judge panel that held three of Texas' 30 congressional districts, as drawn by the state legislature in 1990, were unconstitutional. They were drawn based on racial minority populations in an effort to influence election results. The panel's decision was twice affirmed by the U.S. Supreme Court. In 1995, Hittner blocked the execution of death row inmate Calvin Burdine and ordered a new trial. Burdine's court-appointed counsel in state court had dozed off during significant parts of the proceedings. Hittner's decision was affirmed by the U.S. Court of Appeals for the 5th Circuit, and the U.S. Supreme Court declined to review the decision further.

In 2001, Hittner sentenced Matthew Marshall to 10 years in federal prison for leading a group that burned a cross in the front yard of an African-American family in the Houston suburb of Katy. In 2004, Hittner presided over criminal proceedings against former Enron assistant treasurer Lea Weingarten Fastow, the wife of Enron executive Andrew Fastow. She eventually pleaded guilty to filing a false federal tax return and served one year in federal prison.

Hittner sentenced R. Allen Stanford to a total of 110 years in federal prison for orchestrating a 20-year investment fraud scheme. Stanford, the former chairman of Stanford International Bank, was found guilty of misappropriating more than $7 billion from his bank and financial institutions to finance his personal business and lifestyle. During the six-week trial in 2012, Stanford was convicted on 13 of 14 counts of conspiracy, fraud, obstruction and money laundering. The jury also found that 29 financial accounts located abroad—worth approximately $330 million—were proceeds of Stanford's fraud and should be forfeited. At the time, the Stanford trial was the largest financial fraud case ever tried to a jury in federal court. In 2016, Hittner sentenced the organizer of a sex trafficking ring that operated in Houston's East End to life in federal prison. Hortencia "Tencha" Medeles, then 70, was the leader of an international sex-trafficking ring that forced women, including minors, into prostitution. During the trial in 2015, jurors learned that Medeles owned a three-building complex in southeast Houston. Hidden doorways and staircases led from a downstairs cantina to a brothel upstairs where 17 rooms were rented out for sexual activities. Evidence presented in the case showed rooms were rented out 64,296 times during a 19-month period ending in 2013. In 2016, Hittner granted the agreed dismissal of a wrongful death civil rights lawsuit filed by the family of Sandra Bland, an African-American woman who died in a Texas county jail days after a traffic violation and controversial arrest. Her death was ruled a suicide. Following a judge-approved mediation, the lawyers representing Bland's family told Hittner that a legal settlement, $1.9 million, had resolved their claims.

In 2023, Hittner ruled that Texas Senate Bill 12, legislation that criminalized drag performances in the presence of minors, was unconstitutional on five counts. He issued a permanent injunction against SB12.

== Professional and academic recognition ==
- State Bar of Texas' Presidents' Award as the Outstanding Lawyer in Texas (1984).
- Life Fellow of the Texas Bar Foundation and recipient of the Lola Wright Foundation Award for the Enhancement of Legal Ethics (1985).
- Association of Civil Trial and Appellate Specialists' Civil Judge of the Year (1988).
- American College of Trial Lawyers' Samuel E. Gates Award recognizing improvement of the U.S. litigation process (1989).
- Houston Press Criminal Judge of the Year (1999).
- Order of the Coif (honorary), the highest academic recognition for American law school graduates (2001).
- Texas Bar Foundation's Outstanding 50-Year Lawyer Award (2015).

== Publications and lectures ==
- "Summary Judgments in Texas: State and Federal Practice," 12 recurring law review articles 1981 to 2023.
- "Federal Civil Procedure Before Trial - Fifth Circuit," a three-volume treatise, first published in 1991 and updated annually.
- Contributing author to the State Bar of Texas' "Texas Civil Trial Handbook," first published in 1985.
- Contributing author to the State Bar of Texas' "Texas Collections Manual," first and second editions published in 1987.
- Contributing author to the 15-volume treatise, "Business and Commercial Litigation in Federal Courts," first, second, third, fourth, and fifth editions; initially published in 1998 and updated annually.
- Creator of "Saturday Morning in Court," a continuing legal education lecture series, presented nationwide from 1981 to 2007.
- Creator of "Humor in the Courtroom: Does it Really Exist?" a keynote presentation delivered across the United States and Canada from 1981 to 2007.
- Law school and college lecturer at schools throughout the country, including Harvard Law School, the University of Texas School of Law, Tulane Law School, University of Houston Law Center, South Texas College of Law, and the U.S. Military Academy at West Point.

== Personal life and memberships ==
Hittner has three children, four grandchildren, and two great-grandchildren.

He is a Master Mason, a member of the Scottish Rite of Freemasonry and the Shriners - embracing a family tradition that included his father and later his son. Masonic honors include the Thirty-Third Degree (1991); the Sam Houston Medal, the highest recognition of the Grand Lodge of Texas (2004); and the Thirty-Third Degree with Grand Cross - the rarest honor in Masonry (2019).

Hittner became a Cub Scout in 1947 and has maintained his membership in the Boy Scouts of America throughout adulthood. He has been a scoutmaster and for more than 40 years he has served as a member of both the Sam Houston Area Council Board of Directors and the National Jewish Committee on Scouting. He has been a voting delegate on the National Council of the Boy Scouts of America. His adult recognitions include the Silver Beaver Award (1974,) the Silver Antelope Award (1988) and the Distinguished Eagle Scout Award (1989).

Prior to his military service, he was a competitive flatwater canoeist and later served as a regional officer of the American Canoe Association. He is a member of the American Legion, the Association of the United States Army and the 82nd Airborne Division Association.

He is the founder and former president of the Brooklyn Dodgers Fan Club of Houston. Hittner has played the acoustic 12-string and electric bass guitars in the Texas Barflies, a country-western band.
