= Melinda Harmon =

American judge (born 1946)

Melinda Sue Harmon

Senior Judge of the United States District Court for the Southern District of Texas
- Incumbent
- Assumed office March 31, 2018

Judge of the United States District Court for the Southern District of Texas
- In office May 22, 1989 – March 31, 2018
- Appointed by: George H. W. Bush
- Preceded by: John Virgil Singleton Jr.
- Succeeded by: Jeff Brown

Personal details
- Born: November 1, 1946 (age 79) Port Arthur, Texas, U.S.
- Education: Radcliffe College (AB); University of Texas (JD)

Melinda Sue Harmon (born November 1, 1946) is an inactive senior United States district judge of the United States District Court for the Southern District of Texas, best known as the lead judge in the subsequently overruled Arthur Andersen trial. Civil lawsuits against Enron were consolidated in her court; she oversaw class action lawsuits on behalf of both Enron shareholders and its employees.

== Education and career ==
Harmon was born in Port Arthur, Texas. She attended high school in Justin, Texas, then received an Artium Baccalaureus from Radcliffe College in 1969, followed by a Juris Doctor from the University of Texas School of Law in 1972. She served as a law clerk for Judge John Virgil Singleton Jr. of the United States District Court for the Southern District of Texas from 1973 to 1975. Harmon worked as a trial lawyer for Exxon Company, USA for 12 years during the 1970s and 1980s. In 1986 she ran unsuccessfully for election to a state district court bench, but was appointed by the Governor of Texas to a vacancy in the district court of Harris County, in 1987, a seat that she successfully retained by election in 1988.

=== Federal judicial service ===
On February 28, 1989, Harmon was nominated by President George H. W. Bush to a seat on the United States District Court for the Southern District of Texas vacated by John Virgil Singleton Jr. Harmon was confirmed by the United States Senate on May 18, 1989, and received her commission on May 22, 1989. Harmon assumed inactive senior status on March 31, 2018.

== Major cases ==
- Arthur Andersen LLP v. United States

Legal offices
Preceded by John Virgil Singleton Jr.	Judge of the United States District Court for the Southern District of Texas; 1989–2018	Succeeded by Jeff Brown
