= David S. Morales =

American judge (born 1968)

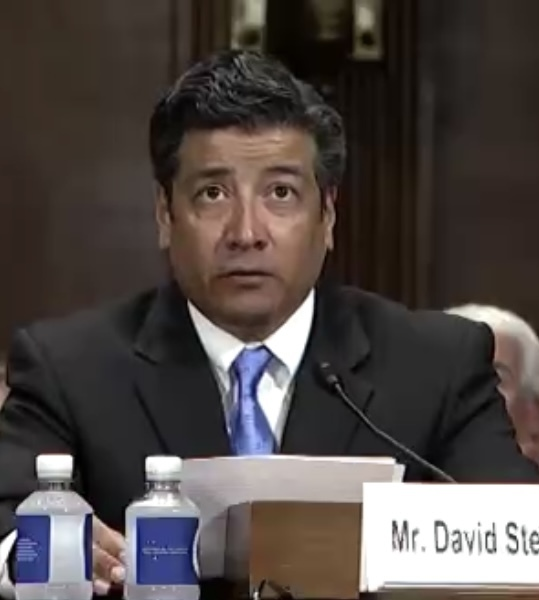

Judge of the United States District Court for the Southern District of Texas
- Incumbent
- Assumed office April 25, 2019
- Appointed by: Donald Trump
- Preceded by: Janis Graham Jack

Personal details
- Born: 1968 (age 56–57); Edinburg, Texas, U.S.
- Education: St. Edward's University (BBA); St. Mary's University (JD)

David Steven Morales (born 1968) is a United States district judge of the United States District Court for the Southern District of Texas.

== Biography ==
Morales received a Bachelor of Business Administration from St. Edward's University and a Juris Doctor from St. Mary's University School of Law. After law school, Morales joined the Texas Attorney General's Office and worked there for 17 years, eventually being promoted to Deputy Attorney General for Civil Litigation and Deputy First Assistant Attorney General. Later, he served as general counsel to Governor Rick Perry from 2011 to 2014. After that position, Morales was Deputy General Counsel to the University of Texas System Board of Regents. Immediately before becoming a judge, he was a partner at Kelly, Hart & Hallman, where he specialized in education and administrative law.

=== Federal judicial service ===
On April 10, 2018, President Donald Trump announced his intent to nominate Morales to serve as a United States District Judge of the United States District Court for the Southern District of Texas. On April 12, 2018, the nomination was sent to the Senate. He was nominated to the seat vacated by Judge Janis Graham Jack, who assumed senior status on June 1, 2011. On June 6, 2018, a hearing on his nomination was held before the Senate Judiciary Committee. On June 28, 2018, his nomination was reported out of committee by an 11–10 vote.

On January 3, 2019, his nomination was returned to the President under Rule XXXI, Paragraph 6 of the United States Senate. On January 23, 2019, President Trump announced his intent to renominate Morales for a federal judgeship. His nomination was sent to the Senate later that day. On February 7, 2019, his nomination was reported out of committee by a 12–10 vote. On April 10, 2019, the Senate invoked cloture on his nomination by a 57–41 vote. Later that day, his nomination was confirmed by a 56–41 vote. He received his judicial commission on April 25, 2019.

== See also ==
- List of Hispanic and Latino American jurists

Legal offices
| Preceded by Janis Graham Jack | Judge of the United States District Court for the Southern District of Texas; 2019–present | Incumbent |
