= Fortunato Benavides =

American judge (1947–2023)

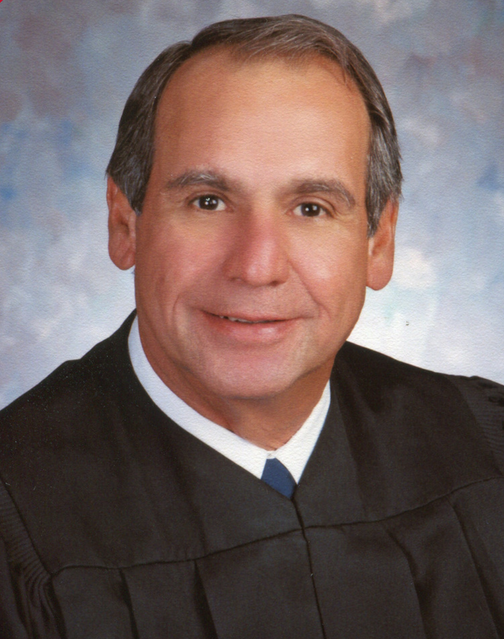

Senior Judge of the United States Court of Appeals for the Fifth Circuit
- In office February 3, 2012 – May 5, 2023

Judge of the United States Court of Appeals for the Fifth Circuit
- In office May 9, 1994 – February 3, 2012
- Appointed by: Bill Clinton
- Preceded by: Thomas Gibbs Gee
- Succeeded by: Gregg Costa

Personal details
- Born: Fortunato Pedro Benavides; February 3, 1947 Mission, Texas, U.S.
- Died: May 5, 2023 (aged 76) Austin, Texas, U.S.
- Education: University of Houston (BBA, JD)

Fortunato Pedro Benavides (February 3, 1947 – May 5, 2023) was an American judge. From 1994 until 2023, he served as a United States circuit judge of the United States Court of Appeals for the Fifth Circuit.

== Education and career ==
Born on February 3, 1947, in Mission, Texas, Benavides received a Bachelor of Business Administration degree in 1968 from the University of Houston. He received a Juris Doctor in 1972 from the University of Houston Law Center. He was in private practice as an attorney in McAllen, Texas from 1972 to 1977, from 1980 to 1981 and from 1993 to 1994. He was a judge of the Hidalgo County, Texas Court-at-Law Number Two, from 1977 to 1979. He was a judge of the Hidalgo County, Texas Ninety Second District Court, from 1981 to 1984. He was a justice of the Thirteenth Court of Appeals of Texas, from 1984 to 1991. He was a judge of the Texas Court of Criminal Appeals, from 1991 to 1992. He was a visiting judge of the Supreme Court of Texas in 1993.

== Federal judicial service ==
Benavides was nominated by President Bill Clinton on January 27, 1994, to a seat on the United States Court of Appeals for the Fifth Circuit vacated by Judge Thomas Gibbs Gee. He was confirmed by the Senate on May 6, 1994, and received his commission on May 9, 1994. He assumed senior status on February 3, 2012.

== Jurisprudence ==
Lawyers who practiced before Benavides considered him an ideological moderate. His opinions were distinguished by their attention to the importance of precedent. Additionally, Benavides was reputed as a succinct writer. His most noteworthy rulings included Burdine v. Johnson, Tennard v. Cockrell (also known as Tennard v. Dretke), and Texas Democratic Party v. Benkiser.

=== Burdine v. Johnson ===
In 2000, Benavides sat on a three-judge panel of the Fifth Circuit to hear the case of Burdine v. Johnson. Burdine, who had received a death sentence for capital murder in Texas, had petitioned the federal courts for a Writ of habeas corpus. Burdine's central complaint was that his court-appointed attorney, Joe Cannon, had fallen asleep repeatedly during his trial.

After hearing the case, Judges Rhesa Barksdale and Edith Jones ruled for the court that Burdine's claim did not, in and of itself, warrant issuance of the writ and grant of a new trial. Rather, Barksdale and Jones reasoned, Burdine would have to show that he was prejudiced by his sleeping lawyer; that is, Burdine would need to show that there was a reasonable likelihood that the outcome of his trial would have been different had his lawyer not repeatedly dozed off.

Benavides issued a strong dissent. Benavides wrote that it shocks the conscience that someone could be sentenced to death after being represented by a lawyer who slept through substantial portions of his trial. In Benavides' view, no further analysis was necessary to find that Burdine had been denied his right to counsel.

Benavides' views were later vindicated when the entire Fifth Circuit, sitting en banc, took up the case and reversed the panel's judgment. Writing for the en banc court, Benavides held that Supreme Court precedent provided a presumption of prejudice where a defendant's lawyer sleeps repeatedly throughout his trial.

Both Benavides' panel dissent and his en banc opinion were covered in the New York Times.

=== Tennard ===
In Tennard v. Cockrell (Tennard I), Benavides applied longstanding precedent of the Fifth Circuit Court of Appeals to an esoteric issue of death penalty law: He affirmed Tennard's death sentence, holding that Texas' capital sentencing law adequately took into account Tennard's evidence of low IQ before he was sentenced to death. The United States Supreme Court took up the case, and in a sharply-worded opinion (Tennard II), held that the Fifth Circuit law Benavides had used was wrong. Justice Sandra Day O'Connor wrote that Benavides' opinion had merely paid "lipservice" to important principles and had used a test that "has no foundation in the decisions of this Court." The case was sent back to the Court of Appeals to apply the right standards as articulated by the Supreme Court.

On remand, Benavides, writing for the majority of a three-judge panel (Tennard III), reversed Tennard's death sentence using the Supreme Court's rule, holding that Texas law had failed to attach sufficient import to Tennard's low IQ evidence. In the course of his new opinion on remand, Benavides chided the Supreme Court for giving inconsistent and indeterminate guidance in the death penalty area, likening the High Court's jurisprudence to the Augean stables.

Court of Appeals Judge Jerry Edwin Smith has since called the Supreme Court's Tennard opinion an unfair "tongue-lashing" that singled out the Fifth Circuit for abuse when the Court of Appeals was only trying to honestly apply the Supreme Court's own "sundry pronouncements."

=== TDP v. Benkiser ===
In TDP v. Benkiser, Benavides weighed in on a controversial election-year ballot dispute. After Congressman Tom DeLay resigned from Congress, the Republican Party of Texas sought to replace him with another candidate on the ballot shortly before the 2006 election. Texas law, however, forbids candidates from being replaced in the months leading up to an election unless they are ruled ineligible. The Texas Democratic Party sued the Republican Party to stop the switch. In court, the Republican Party argued that Tom DeLay was in fact ineligible to run for Congress in Texas because he had recently moved to Virginia.

Benavides, writing for a unanimous three-judge panel of the Fifth Circuit that included conservative Republican appointee Edith Brown Clement, ruled in favor of the Democrats. According to Benavides, the plain language of the Constitution says that candidates for Congress only need be residents of the requisite state, in this case Texas, as of election day. Since Tom DeLay had not yet failed to reside in Texas on election day (because that day had not yet come), he remained eligible.

Benavides' opinion was hailed both by academics and by the press. Professor Rick Hasen called the opinion's reasoning "solid." The Houston Chronicle wrote, "The laudable impartiality by the judges making these politically sensitive rulings should strengthen the confidence of all parties that they can get a fair day in federal court." The Washington Post applauded Benavides' ruling as both correct as a matter of constitutional law and preferable as a matter of public policy.

== Death ==
Benavides died on May 5, 2023, at the age of 76. He was survived by his wife, Evelyn Benavides, daughters Amanda Laura Carter and Adelaide Pilar Benavides, and grandsons Noah George Carter and Milo Harrison Carter.

== See also ==
- List of Hispanic and Latino American jurists

== Notes ==
Legal offices
| Preceded by Thomas Gibbs Gee | Judge of the United States Court of Appeals for the Fifth Circuit; 1994–2012 | Succeeded by Gregg Costa |
