= Joseph Chappell Hutcheson Jr. =

American mayor and judge (1879–1973)

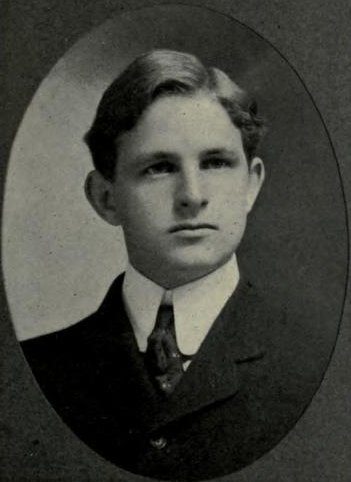
- Hutcheson in 1904 publication

Senior Judge of the United States Court of Appeals for the Fifth Circuit
- In office November 4, 1964 – January 18, 1973

Chief Judge of the United States Court of Appeals for the Fifth Circuit
- In office 1948–1959
- Preceded by: Office established
- Succeeded by: Richard Rives

Judge of the United States Court of Appeals for the Fifth Circuit
- In office January 26, 1931 – November 4, 1964
- Appointed by: Herbert Hoover
- Preceded by: Seat established by 46 Stat. 538
- Succeeded by: Homer Thornberry

Judge of the United States District Court for the Southern District of Texas
- In office April 6, 1918 – January 26, 1931
- Appointed by: Woodrow Wilson
- Preceded by: Waller Thomas Burns
- Succeeded by: Thomas Martin Kennerly

41st Mayor of Houston
- In office 1917–1918
- Preceded by: Joseph Jay Pastoriza
- Succeeded by: Almeron Earl Amerman Sr.

Personal details
- Born: Joseph Chappell Hutcheson Jr. October 19, 1879 Houston, Texas, U.S.
- Died: January 18, 1973 (aged 93) Houston, Texas, U.S.
- Parent: Joseph Chappell Hutcheson (father)
- Education: University of Virginia; University of Texas School of Law (LLB)
- Occupation: Politician; lawyer; judge

Joseph Chappell Hutcheson Jr. (October 19, 1879 – January 18, 1973) was a United States circuit judge of the United States Court of Appeals for the Fifth Circuit and previously was a United States district judge of the United States District Court for the Southern District of Texas. He served as Mayor of Houston from 1917 to 1918.

== Early life ==
Joseph Chappell Hutcheson Jr. was born on October 19, 1879, in Houston, Texas, to Mildred Lightfoot (née Carrington) and Joseph Chappell Hutcheson. He studied at the public and private schools of Houston and at Bethel Military Academy. Hutcheson studied at the University of Virginia, but transferred and graduated with a Bachelor of Laws in 1900 from the University of Texas School of Law.

== Career ==
=== Law practice and Mayor of Houston ===
Hutcheson started a law practice with his father. He had a private practice in Houston from 1900 to 1918. He was chief legal adviser to Houston from 1913 to 1917. He was Mayor of Houston from 1917 to 1918.

=== Federal judicial service ===
Hutcheson was nominated by President Woodrow Wilson on March 29, 1918, to a seat on the United States District Court for the Southern District of Texas vacated by Judge Waller Thomas Burns. He was confirmed by the United States Senate on April 6, 1918, and received his commission on April 6, 1918. His service terminated on January 26, 1931, due to his elevation to the Fifth Circuit.

Hutcheson was nominated by President Herbert Hoover on December 20, 1930, to the United States Court of Appeals for the Fifth Circuit, to a new seat authorized by 46 Stat. 538. He was confirmed by the Senate on January 13, 1931, and received his commission on January 26, 1931. Franklin Roosevelt considered Hutcheson for a possible Supreme Court appointment during the early years of his presidency, and never let Hugo Black forget this after losing out thereto.

He served as Chief Judge and as a member of the Judicial Conference of the United States from 1948 to 1959. During this era he ran the court in what has been described as an autocratic manner, while after he stepped down as Chief Judge, Hutcheson sat on only five of the controversial civil rights cases for which the court soon became famous. Although he described himself as a Jeffersonian Democrat, Hutcheson was generally not unfavourable to the civil rights decisions of the "Fifth Circuit Four" emerging during the later years of his reign.

Due to poor health Hutcheson assumed senior status on November 4, 1964, by when he was the longest-serving federal judge measured by time in active service since the Civil War. As of 2025 Hutcheson remains the eighth-longest-serving federal judge by time in active service. He was the last appeals court judge in active service appointed by President Hoover, and the last federal judge in active service originally appointed to the bench by President Wilson. His service terminated on January 18, 1973, due to his death in Houston.

=== Other service ===
Hutcheson was also a member of the Anglo-American Committee on Displaced Persons that recommended in 1946 that Britain greatly increase the number of Jewish refugees it would let into Palestine.

== See also ==
- List of United States federal judges by longevity of service

== Sources ==
Legal offices
Preceded by Waller Thomas Burns	Judge of the United States District Court for the Southern District of Texas; 1918–1931	Succeeded by Thomas Martin Kennerly
Preceded by Seat established by 46 Stat. 538	Judge of the United States Court of Appeals for the Fifth Circuit; 1931–1964	Succeeded by Homer Thornberry
Preceded by Office established	Chief Judge of the United States Court of Appeals for the Fifth Circuit; 1948–1959	Succeeded by Richard Rives
Political offices
Preceded by Joseph Jay Pastoriza	Mayor of Houston; 1917–1918	Succeeded by Almeron Earl Amerman Sr.
