= Carl Olaf Bue Jr. =

American judge (1922–2020)

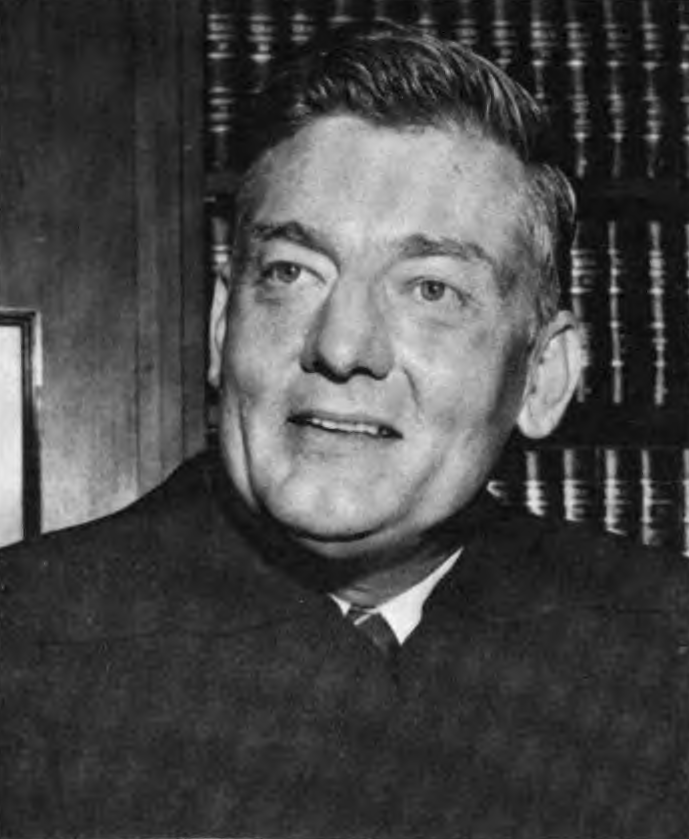

Senior Judge of the United States District Court for the Southern District of Texas
- In office September 2, 1987 – December 24, 2020

Judge of the United States District Court for the Southern District of Texas
- In office October 15, 1970 – September 2, 1987
- Appointed by: Richard Nixon
- Preceded by: Joe McDonald Ingraham
- Succeeded by: Kenneth M. Hoyt

Personal details
- Born: March 27, 1922 Chicago, Illinois, U.S.
- Died: December 24, 2020 (aged 98)
- Education: Northwestern University (PhB); University of Texas (LLB)

Carl Olaf Bue Jr. (March 27, 1922 – December 24, 2020) was a United States district judge of the United States District Court for the Southern District of Texas.

== Education and career ==
Born in Chicago, Illinois, Bue received a Bachelor of Philosophy degree from Northwestern University in 1951 and a Bachelor of Laws from the University of Texas School of Law in 1954. He served as a captain in the United States Army Adjutant General's Department, during World War II, from 1942 to 1946. He was in private practice at Royston Rayzor in Houston, Texas, from 1954 to 1970.

== Federal judicial service ==
On August 11, 1970, Bue was nominated by President Richard Nixon to a seat on the United States District Court for the Southern District of Texas vacated by Judge Joe McDonald Ingraham. Bue was confirmed by the United States Senate on October 13, 1970, and received his commission on October 15, 1970. He assumed senior status on September 2, 1987. He died on December 24, 2020, aged 98.

== See also ==
- List of United States federal judges by longevity of service

== Sources ==
- "Judge Carl O. Bue, Jr. Papers: An Inventory of His Records at the Houston Metropolitan Research Center, Houston Public Library". University of Texas.

Legal offices
Preceded by Joe McDonald Ingraham	Judge of the United States District Court for the Southern District of Texas; 1970–1987	Succeeded by Kenneth M. Hoyt
