= Joe McDonald Ingraham =

American judge (1903–1990)

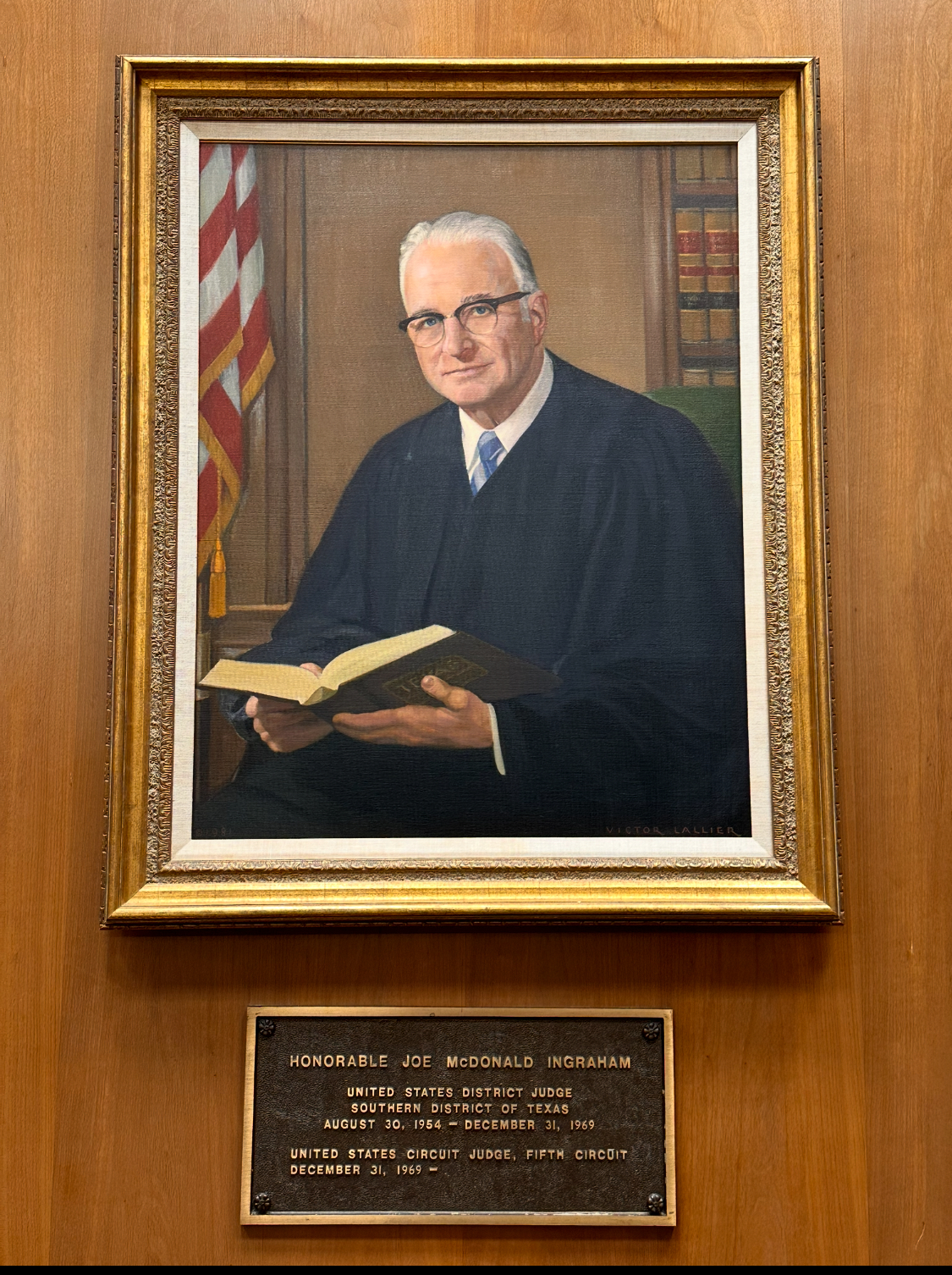
- Photograph of the portrait of Judge Ingraham which hangs in Courtroom 11B of the Bob Casey Federal Building in Houston, Texas

Senior Judge of the United States Court of Appeals for the Fifth Circuit
- In office July 31, 1973 – May 27, 1990

Judge of the United States Court of Appeals for the Fifth Circuit
- In office December 18, 1969 – July 31, 1973
- Appointed by: Richard Nixon
- Preceded by: Seat established by 82 Stat. 184
- Succeeded by: Thomas Gibbs Gee

Judge of the United States District Court for the Southern District of Texas
- In office August 6, 1954 – December 31, 1969
- Appointed by: Dwight D. Eisenhower
- Preceded by: Thomas Martin Kennerly
- Succeeded by: Carl Olaf Bue Jr.

Personal details
- Born: Joe McDonald Ingraham; July 5, 1903 Pawnee County, Oklahoma Territory
- Died: May 27, 1990 (aged 86) Houston, Texas, U.S.
- Education: National University School of Law (LLB)

Joe McDonald Ingraham (July 5, 1903 – May 27, 1990) was a United States circuit judge of the United States Court of Appeals for the Fifth Circuit and previously was a United States District Court Judge of the United States District Court for the Southern District of Texas Houston Division. In 1967 he presided at the draft-evasion trial of Muhammad Ali, the heavyweight boxing champion. Ali was convicted and sentenced to jail, but the conviction was overturned by the United States Supreme Court.

== Education and career ==
Born in Pawnee County, Oklahoma, Ingraham received a Bachelor of Laws from National University School of Law (now the George Washington University Law School) in Washington, D.C., in 1927. He was then in private practice in Stroud, Oklahoma until 1928, then in Fort Worth, Texas until 1935, and then in Houston, Texas from 1935 to 1942. He was in the United States Army Air Forces during World War II, from 1942 to 1946, reaching the rank of lieutenant colonel. After the war, he returned to private practice in Houston until 1954.

== Federal judicial service ==
On May 10, 1954, Ingraham was nominated by President Dwight D. Eisenhower to a seat on the United States District Court for the Southern District of Texas vacated by Judge Thomas Martin Kennerly. Ingraham was confirmed by the United States Senate on August 6, 1954, and received his commission the same day. His service terminated on December 31, 1969, due to his elevation to the Fifth Circuit.

On December 2, 1969, President Richard Nixon nominated Ingraham for elevation to a new seat on the United States Court of Appeals for the Fifth Circuit created by 82 Stat. 184. Confirmed by the Senate on December 17, 1969, Ingraham received his commission the following day. He assumed senior status on July 31, 1973, serving in that capacity until his death, on May 27, 1990, in Houston. He served additionally as a judge of the Temporary Emergency Court of Appeals from 1976 to 1988.

== Sources ==
Legal offices
Preceded by Thomas Martin Kennerly	Judge of the United States District Court for the Southern District of Texas; 1954–1969	Succeeded by Carl Olaf Bue Jr.
Preceded by Seat established by 82 Stat. 184	Judge of the United States Court of Appeals for the Fifth Circuit; 1969–1973	Succeeded by Thomas Gibbs Gee
