= George Edward Cire =

American judge

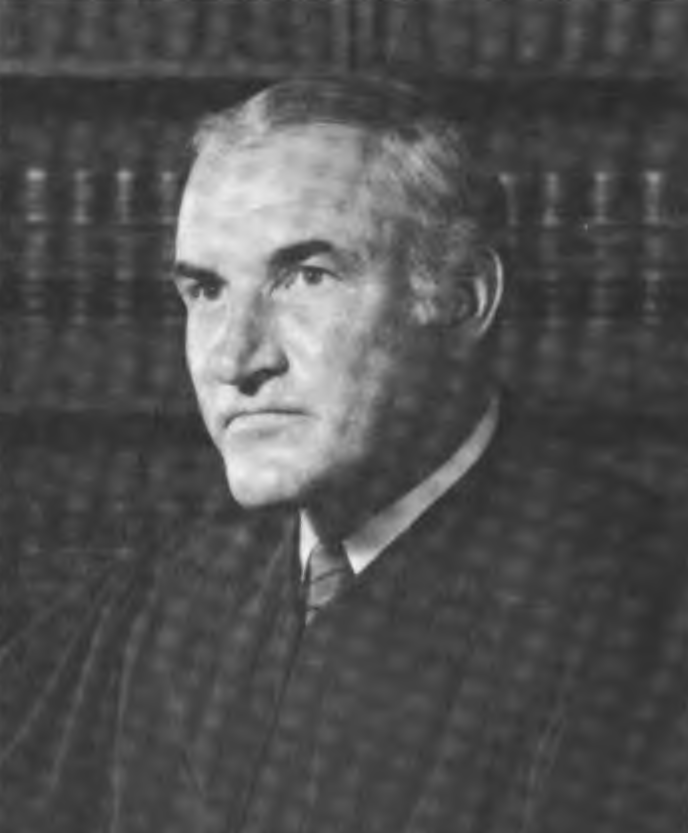

Judge of the United States District Court for the Southern District of Texas
- In office May 11, 1979 – May 5, 1985
- Appointed by: Jimmy Carter
- Preceded by: Seat established by 92 Stat. 1629
- Succeeded by: David Hittner

Personal details
- Born: George Edward Cire; September 29, 1922 Houston, Texas
- Died: May 5, 1985 (aged 62) Houston, Texas
- Education: St. Edward's University (BS); University of Texas School of Law (LLB)

George Edward Cire (September 29, 1922 – May 5, 1985) was a United States district judge of the United States District Court for the Southern District of Texas.

== Early life and family ==
Born in Houston, Texas, on September 29, 1922, Cire was one of three children born to Jorda M. Cire and Ida M. Cire. On July 12, 1954, Cire married Mary Margaret Scott of Paris, Texas, and together they had six children, Scott E. Cire, George E. Cire, Susan Cire, Mary Margaret Cire, Stephen E. Cire and Jennifer E. Cire.

== Education and career ==
Cire attended St. Thomas High School in Houston, Texas and graduated in 1940. Cire went on to receive a Bachelor of Science degree from St. Edward's University in 1943 and was in the United States Marine Corps during World War II, from 1943 to 1946. He received a Bachelor of Laws from the University of Texas School of Law in 1948, entering private practice in Houston from 1949 to 1950. He was again in the Marine Corps from 1950 to 1951, returning to his private practice from 1951 to 1964. After his discharge from active duty in the Marine Corps, George began practicing law in Houston, Texas. For most of his years as a trial lawyer, he and Joseph D. Jamail were partners in private law practice.

== Military service ==
Cire was awarded two Purple Hearts, as well as the Silver Star for conspicuous gallantry and intrepidity as a Platoon Leader of Company C, First Battalion, Twenty-third Marines, Fourth Marine Division in action against enemy Japanese forces on Iwo Jima, Volcano Islands on February 19, 1945. Landing with the reserve company of an assault battalion, Cire led his platoon forward in rear of an assault company and observing that it was disorganized alerted his men to pass through it. Moving his platoon to the front he directed the annihilation of the hostile personnel in three pill boxes and in numerous fire trenches. When fire from an enemy emplacement pinned down his platoon, Cire returned to the beach and obtaining a tank, guided the armored vehicle by walking before it in the face of hostile fire. Although wounded while on this mission, Cire continued to lead the tank to his platoon area, and by directing its fire on the Japanese emplacement, neutralized the enemy strong point and enabled his unit to continue its advance.

== State judicial service ==
Cire was a judge of the newly created 165th District Court in Houston from 1964 to 1976. In 1976, Governor Dolph Briscoe appointed him to the 14th Court of Appeals, where he served as an associate justice until 1979.

== Federal judicial service ==
On February 13, 1979, Cire was nominated by President Jimmy Carter to a new seat on the United States District Court for the Southern District of Texas created by 92 Stat. 1629. He was confirmed by the United States Senate on May 10, 1979, and received his commission on May 11, 1979. Cire served in that capacity until his death on May 5, 1985, in Houston.

== Sources ==
Legal offices
| Preceded by Seat established by 92 Stat. 1629 | Judge of the United States District Court for the Southern District of Texas; 1979–1985 | Succeeded by David Hittner |
