= Rolando Olvera =

American judge (born 1963)

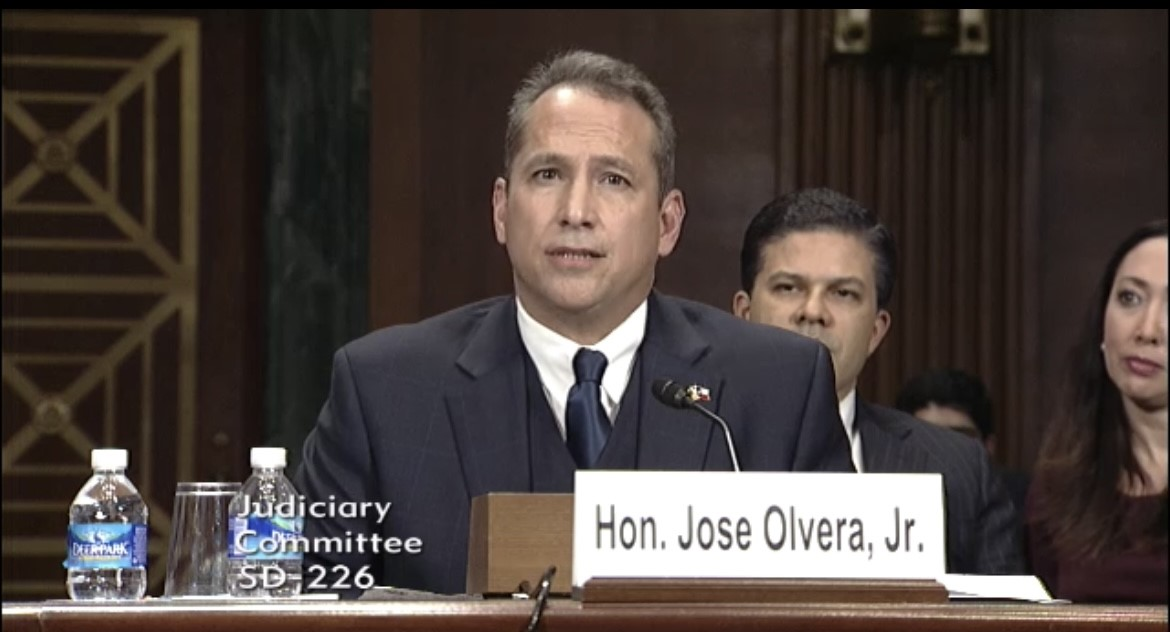
- U.S. District Court Judge Southern District of Texas Brownsville Division

Judge of the United States District Court for the Southern District of Texas
- Incumbent
- Assumed office August 4, 2015
- Appointed by: Barack Obama

Personal details
- Born: March 31, 1963 (age 63) Houston, Texas
- Education: Harvard University (BA); University of Texas School of Law (JD)

Rolando Olvera is a United States District Court Judge for the Southern District of Texas, Brownsville Division.

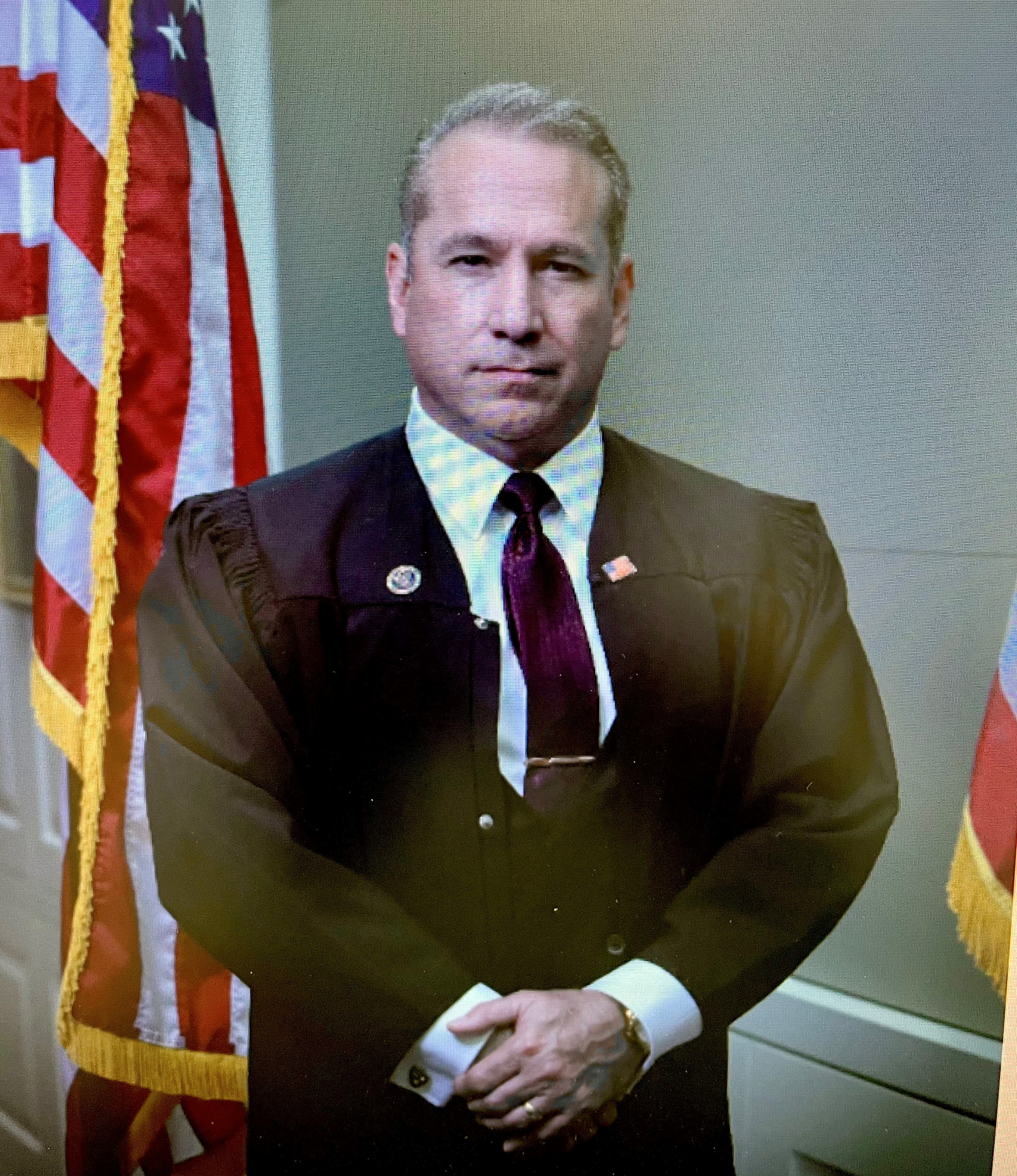

== Biography ==
Born in Houston, but raised in Brownsville, TX. A devout Catholic, Olvera graduated elementary from St. Mary's Catholic School ('75) and high school from Saint Joseph Academy ('81). Received undergraduate degree from Harvard University ('85), and Juris Doctor (J.D.) degree from The University of Texas School of Law ('89). Began legal career at the law firm of Atlas & Hall LLP, from 1990 to 1993, and the law firm of Fleming & Olvera, PC and its predecessor firms, from 1994 to 2000. Appointed twice by the Governor of Texas as a State District Court Judge, in 2001 to the 357th State District Court, and then in 2005 to the 138th State District Court. Running as a Democrat in 2008, Olvera was elected to the 445th State District Court and reelected to same in 2012. Additionally, appointed by the Governor of Texas as Presiding Judge of the Fifth Administrative Judicial Region in 2011. Olvera held both judicial positions until his appointment to the federal bench.

=== Federal Judicial Service ===
On September 18, 2014, President Barack Obama nominated Olvera to serve as a United States District Judge of the United States District Court for the Southern District of Texas. On December 16, 2014, his nomination was returned to the president due to the sine die adjournment of the 113th Congress. On January 7, 2015, President Obama renominated him to the same position. Olvera received a hearing before the Judiciary Committee January 21, 2015. On February 26, 2015, his nomination was reported out of committee by voice vote. On May 21, 2015, the U.S. Senate confirmed Olvera's nomination by a 100–0 vote. Olvera received his judicial commission August 4, 2015.

== See also ==
- List of Hispanic and Latino American jurists

Legal offices
Preceded by Hilda G. Tagle	Judge of the United States District Court for the Southern District of Texas; 2015–present	Incumbent
