= Kenneth M. Hoyt =

American judge (born 1948)

Senior Judge of the United States District Court for the Southern District of Texas
- Incumbent
- Assumed office March 2, 2013

Judge of the United States District Court for the Southern District of Texas
- In office April 1, 1988 – March 2, 2013
- Appointed by: Ronald Reagan
- Preceded by: Carl Olaf Bue Jr.
- Succeeded by: Alfred H. Bennett

Personal details
- Born: Kenneth Michael Hoyt; March 2, 1948 (age 78) San Augustine County, Texas, U.S.
- Education: Texas Southern University (AB, JD)

Kenneth Michael Hoyt (born March 2, 1948) is a senior United States district judge of the United States District Court for the Southern District of Texas.

== Education and career ==
Hoyt was born in San Augustine County, Texas. He received an Artium Baccalaureus degree from Texas Southern University in 1969 and a Juris Doctor from the Thurgood Marshall School of Law at Texas Southern University in 1972. He was in private practice in Houston, Texas from 1972 to 1985. He was a city attorney of Kendleton, Texas from 1975 to 1981, and then of Prairie View, Texas. Hoyt served as a presiding judge of the 125th Civil District Court of Texas from 1981 to 1982. At the same time, Hoyt was a member of the faculty of the South Texas College Trial Advocacy Program, and from 1983 to 1984, he was an adjunct professor at the Thurgood Marshall School of Law. He was a justice of the First District Court of Appeals of Texas from 1985 to 1988.

=== Federal judicial service ===
On November 24, 1987, Hoyt was nominated by President Ronald Reagan to a seat on the United States District Court for the Southern District of Texas vacated by Judge Carl Olaf Bue Jr. Hoyt was confirmed by the United States Senate on March 31, 1988, and received his commission on April 1, 1988. Hoyt was the second African American federal judge in the state of Texas. He took senior status on March 2, 2013.

In March 2019, Hoyt found that a board member's rights under the First Amendment to the United States Constitution had not been violated when he was censured by the rest of the board. That judgment was reversed by the United States Court of Appeals for the Fifth Circuit before the circuit itself was reversed by the unanimous Supreme Court of the United States in Houston Community College System v. Wilson (2022).

== See also ==
- List of African-American federal judges
- List of African-American jurists

== Sources ==
Legal offices
Preceded by Carl Olaf Bue Jr.	Judge of the United States District Court for the Southern District of Texas; 1988–2013	Succeeded by Alfred H. Bennett
