= Ricardo Hinojosa =

American judge (born 1950)

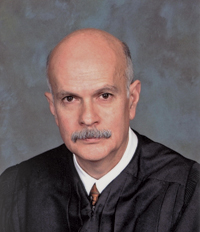

Senior Judge of the United States District Court for the Southern District of Texas
- In office May 21, 2025 – October 1, 2025

Chief Judge of the United States District Court for the Southern District of Texas
- In office November 13, 2009 – November 13, 2016
- Preceded by: Hayden Wilson Head Jr.
- Succeeded by: Lee H. Rosenthal

Judge of the United States District Court for the Southern District of Texas
- In office May 5, 1983 – May 21, 2025
- Appointed by: Ronald Reagan
- Preceded by: Woodrow Bradley Seals
- Succeeded by: Arthur R. Jones

Personal details
- Born: January 24, 1950 (age 76) Rio Grande City, Texas, U.S.
- Education: University of Texas (BA); Harvard Law School (JD)

Ricardo H. Hinojosa (born January 24, 1950) is a senior United States district judge of the United States District Court for the Southern District of Texas and served as the chairman of the United States Sentencing Commission.

== Education and career ==
Hinojosa was born in Rio Grande City, Texas. He received a Bachelor of Arts degree from the University of Texas, Austin in 1972, and a Juris Doctor from Harvard Law School in 1975. He was a law clerk to the Texas Supreme Court from 1975 to 1976. He was then in private practice in McAllen, Texas, until 1983. In 2015, he received the Presidential Citation from UT Austin.

=== Federal judicial service ===
On April 12, 1983, Hinojosa was nominated by President Ronald Reagan to a seat on the United States District Court for the Southern District of Texas vacated by Judge Woodrow Bradley Seals. Hinojosa was confirmed by the United States Senate on May 4, 1983, and received his commission on May 5, 1983. He was appointed as a commissioner on the United States Sentencing Commission by then President George W. Bush in 2003. He served as chief judge from 2009 to 2016. He assumed senior status on May 21, 2025, by which time Hinojosa was the longest-serving federal judge remaining in active service. Hinojosa left the court on October 1, 2025.

== See also ==
- George W. Bush Supreme Court candidates
- List of Hispanic and Latino American jurists
- List of United States federal judges by longevity of service

== Sources ==
Legal offices
Preceded by Woodrow Bradley Seals	Judge of the United States District Court for the Southern District of Texas; 1983–2025	Succeeded by Arthur R. Jones
Preceded by Hayden Wilson Head Jr.	Chief Judge of the United States District Court for the Southern District of Texas; 2009–2016	Succeeded by Lee H. Rosenthal
