= Arthur R. Jones =

American attorney (born 1969)

Arthur Roberts Jones
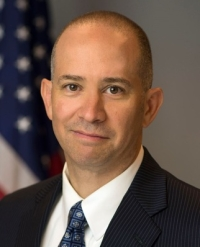

Judge of the United States District Court for the Southern District of Texas
- Incumbent
- Assumed office July 29, 2026
- Appointed by: Donald Trump
- Preceded by: Ricardo Hinojosa

Personal details
- Born: Arthur Roberts Jones; 1969 (age 56–57) New York City
- Education: Indiana University Bloomington (BA); Georgetown University (JD)

Military service
- Branch/service: United States Air Force; Air Force Reserve
- Years of service: 1995–2002 (active); 2002–2023 (reserve)
- Rank: Lieutenant Colonel
- Unit: United States Air Force Judge Advocate General's Corps

Arthur Roberts Jones (born 1969) is an American lawyer who has served as a United States district judge of the United States District Court for the Southern District of Texas since 2026. He served as an assistant United States attorney from 2002 to 2026, serving as the executive assistant United States attorney for the same district from 2025 to 2026

== Education ==
Jones was born in 1969 in New York City. He earned his Bachelor of Arts degree in 1991 from Indiana University Bloomington and received his Juris Doctor in 1994 from Georgetown University Law Center.

== Career ==
From 2025 to 2026, he served as the executive assistant United States attorney for the Southern District of Texas. Jones began his career in the United States Air Force Judge Advocate General's Corps from January 1995 to September 2002, specializing in criminal litigation. He remained a judge-advocate in the United States Air Force Reserve after his separation from active duty in September 2002, until his retirement from the Air Force Reserve in February 2023. Jones served as an assistant United States attorney for the Southern District of Texas since his separation from active duty in September 2002 until he was commissioned as a federal judge in July 2026.

=== Federal judicial service ===
On April 1, 2026, President Donald Trump announced his intention to nominate Jones to an undesignated seat on the United States District Court for the Southern District of Texas. On April 14, 2026, Trump nominated Jones to the seat vacated by Judge Ricardo Hinojosa. On April 29, 2026, he had his confirmation hearing with the Senate Judiciary Committee. On June 18, 2026, the Judiciary Committee advanced his nomination on a 12–10 party-line vote. On June 24, 2026, the Senate invoked cloture on his nomination by a 50–44 vote. On July 13, 2026, his nomination was confirmed by the Senate by a 46–44 vote. He received his judicial commission on July 29, 2026.

Legal offices
Preceded by Ricardo Hinojosa	Judge of the United States District Court for the Southern District of Texas; 2026–present	Incumbent
