= Thomas Martin Kennerly =

American judge (1874–1962)

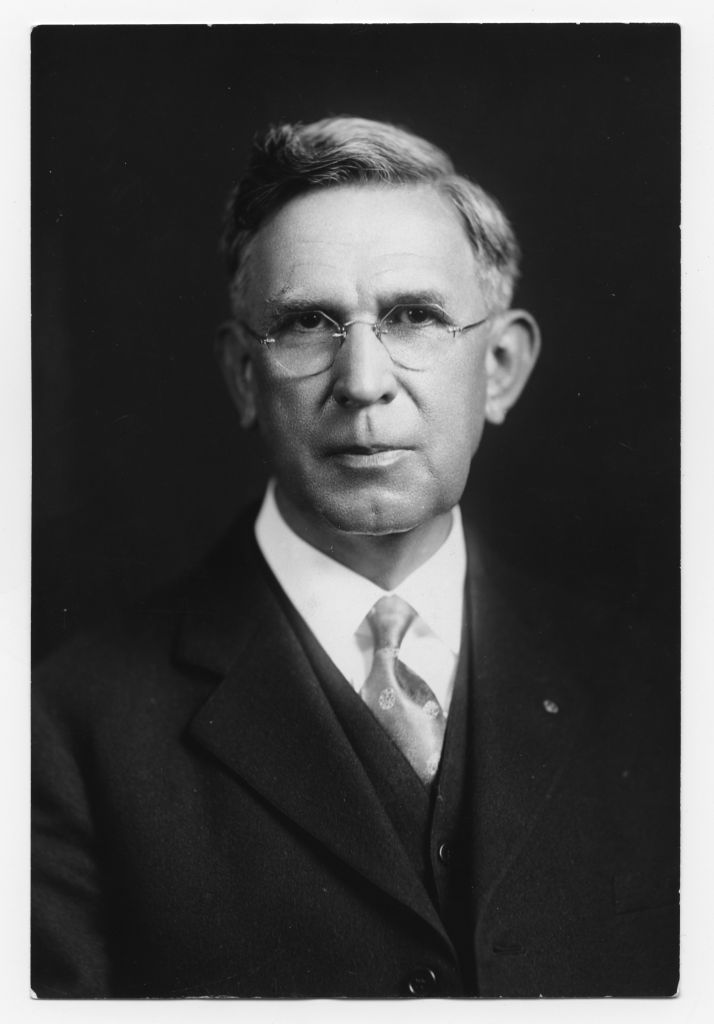

Senior Judge of the United States District Court for the Southern District of Texas
- In office August 29, 1954 – July 29, 1962

Judge of the United States District Court for the Southern District of Texas
- In office February 7, 1931 – August 29, 1954
- Appointed by: Herbert Hoover
- Preceded by: Joseph Chappell Hutcheson Jr.
- Succeeded by: Joe McDonald Ingraham

Personal details
- Born: Thomas Martin Kennerly; January 24, 1874 Lee County, Texas, U.S.
- Died: July 29, 1962 (aged 88) Houston, Texas, U.S.
- Education: read law

Thomas Martin Kennerly (January 24, 1874 – July 29, 1962) was a United States district judge of the United States District Court for the Southern District of Texas.

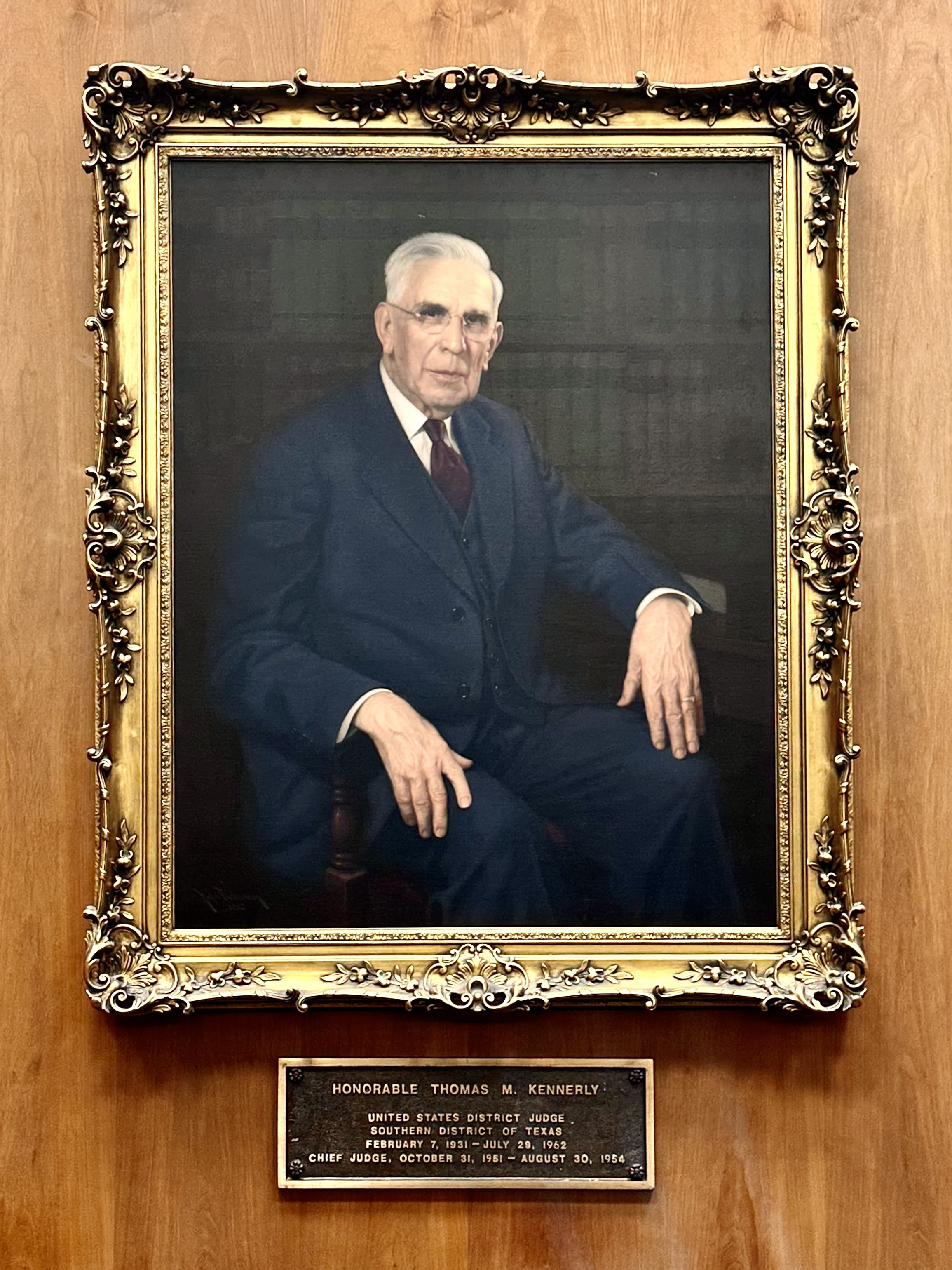
Portrait of Hon. Thomas M. Kennelly in Courtroom 11A of the Bob Casey Federal Building in Houston, Texas.

== Education and career ==
Born in Lee County, Texas, Kennerly read law to enter the bar in 1893. He was in private practice in Giddings, Texas from 1893 to 1897 and in Houston, Texas from 1897 to 1931. He was a Referee in Bankruptcy for the United States District Court for the Southern District of Texas from 1903 to 1906. He was a special state district judge for Harris County, Texas in 1918. Kennerly was the Republican nominee in the 1924 United States Senate election in Texas, where he lost overwhelming and only received 14.60% of the vote.

== Federal judicial service ==
On January 24, 1931, Kennerly was nominated by President Herbert Hoover to a seat on the United States District Court for the Southern District of Texas vacated by Judge Joseph Chappell Hutcheson Jr. Kennerly was confirmed by the United States Senate on February 4, 1931, and received his commission on February 7, 1931. He assumed senior status on August 29, 1954, serving in that capacity until his death on July 29, 1962, in Houston.

== Sources ==
Legal offices
Preceded by Joseph Chappell Hutcheson Jr.	Judge of the United States District Court for the Southern District of Texas; 1931–1954	Succeeded by Joe McDonald Ingraham
