= Keith P. Ellison =

American judge (born 1950)

Judge of the United States District Court for the Southern District of Texas
- Incumbent
- Assumed office July 7, 1999
- Appointed by: Bill Clinton
- Preceded by: Norman William Black

Personal details
- Born: Keith Paty Ellison; April 29, 1950 (age 76) New Orleans, Louisiana, U.S.
- Education: Harvard University (BA); Magdalen College, Oxford (BA); Yale University (JD)

Keith Paty Ellison (born April 29, 1950) is a United States district judge of the United States District Court for the Southern District of Texas. His chambers are in Houston.

== Education ==
Ellison was born in 1950 in New Orleans. He was educated first at Harvard College, from which he received a Bachelor of Arts degree from Harvard University in 1972. He was awarded a Rhodes scholarship to Oxford where he studied at Magdalen College, receiving a second Bachelor of Arts degree in 1974. He received his Juris Doctor from Yale Law School in 1976.

== Career ==
After graduating from Yale, he clerked for Judge J. Skelly Wright of the United States Court of Appeals for the District of Columbia Circuit. He then clerked for Justice Harry Blackmun of the Supreme Court of the United States during the October 1977 term, before entering private practice in Houston.

=== Federal judicial service ===
On January 26, 1999, Ellison was nominated by President Bill Clinton to a seat on the United States District Court for the Southern District of Texas vacated by Judge Norman William Black. Ellison was confirmed by the United States Senate on June 30, 1999, and received his commission on July 7, 1999. His chambers were in Laredo, until 2005 when his duty station transferred to Houston.

== See also ==
- List of law clerks for the second seat of the Supreme Court of the United States

== Sources ==
Legal offices
Preceded by Norman William Black	Judge of the United States District Court for the Southern District of Texas; 1999–present	Incumbent
