= Thomas Gibbs Gee =

American judge (1925–1994)

Judge of the United States Court of Appeals for the Fifth Circuit
- In office July 18, 1973 – February 1, 1991
- Appointed by: Richard Nixon
- Preceded by: Joe McDonald Ingraham
- Succeeded by: Fortunato Benavides

Personal details
- Born: Thomas Gibbs Gee; December 9, 1925 Jacksonville, Florida, U.S.
- Died: October 25, 1994 (aged 68) Houston, Texas, U.S.
- Education: United States Military Academy (BS); University of Texas School of Law (LLB)

Thomas Gibbs Gee (December 9, 1925 – October 25, 1994) was a United States circuit judge of the United States Court of Appeals for the Fifth Circuit.

== Education and career ==
Born in Jacksonville, Florida, Gee received a Bachelor of Science degree from United States Military Academy in 1946. He was a lieutenant in the United States Army Air Corps in the aftermath of World War II, from 1946 to 1947, and then in the United States Air Force, from 1947 to 1950. He received a Bachelor of Laws from the University of Texas School of Law in 1953, and was in private practice in Houston, Texas from 1953 to 1954, and in Austin, Texas from 1954 to 1973.

== Federal judicial service ==
On June 11, 1973, Gee was nominated by President Richard Nixon to a seat on the United States Court of Appeals for the Fifth Circuit vacated by Judge Joe McDonald Ingraham. Gee was confirmed by the United States Senate on July 13, 1973, and received his commission on July 18, 1973. Gee served in that capacity until his retirement from the bench on February 1, 1991.

== Post judicial service ==
Gee then returned to private practice in Houston until he died there, on October 25, 1994.

== Sources ==
Legal offices
Preceded by Joe McDonald Ingraham	Judge of the United States Court of Appeals for the Fifth Circuit; 1973–1991	Succeeded by Fortunato Benavides
