= John Virgil Singleton Jr. =

American judge

- Singleton in 1970

Senior Judge of the United States District Court for the Southern District of Texas
- In office April 1, 1988 – June 1, 1992

Chief Judge of the United States District Court for the Southern District of Texas
- In office 1979–1988
- Preceded by: Reynaldo Guerra Garza
- Succeeded by: James DeAnda

Judge of the United States District Court for the Southern District of Texas
- In office July 22, 1966 – April 1, 1988
- Appointed by: Lyndon B. Johnson
- Preceded by: Seat established by 80 Stat. 75
- Succeeded by: Melinda Harmon

Personal details
- Born: John Virgil Singleton Jr. March 20, 1918 Kaufman, Texas, U.S.
- Died: March 20, 2015 (aged 97) Houston, Texas, U.S.
- Party: Democratic
- Education: University of Texas at Austin (B.A.); Naval Justice School

John Virgil Singleton Jr. (March 20, 1918 – March 20, 2015) was a United States district judge of the United States District Court for the Southern District of Texas.

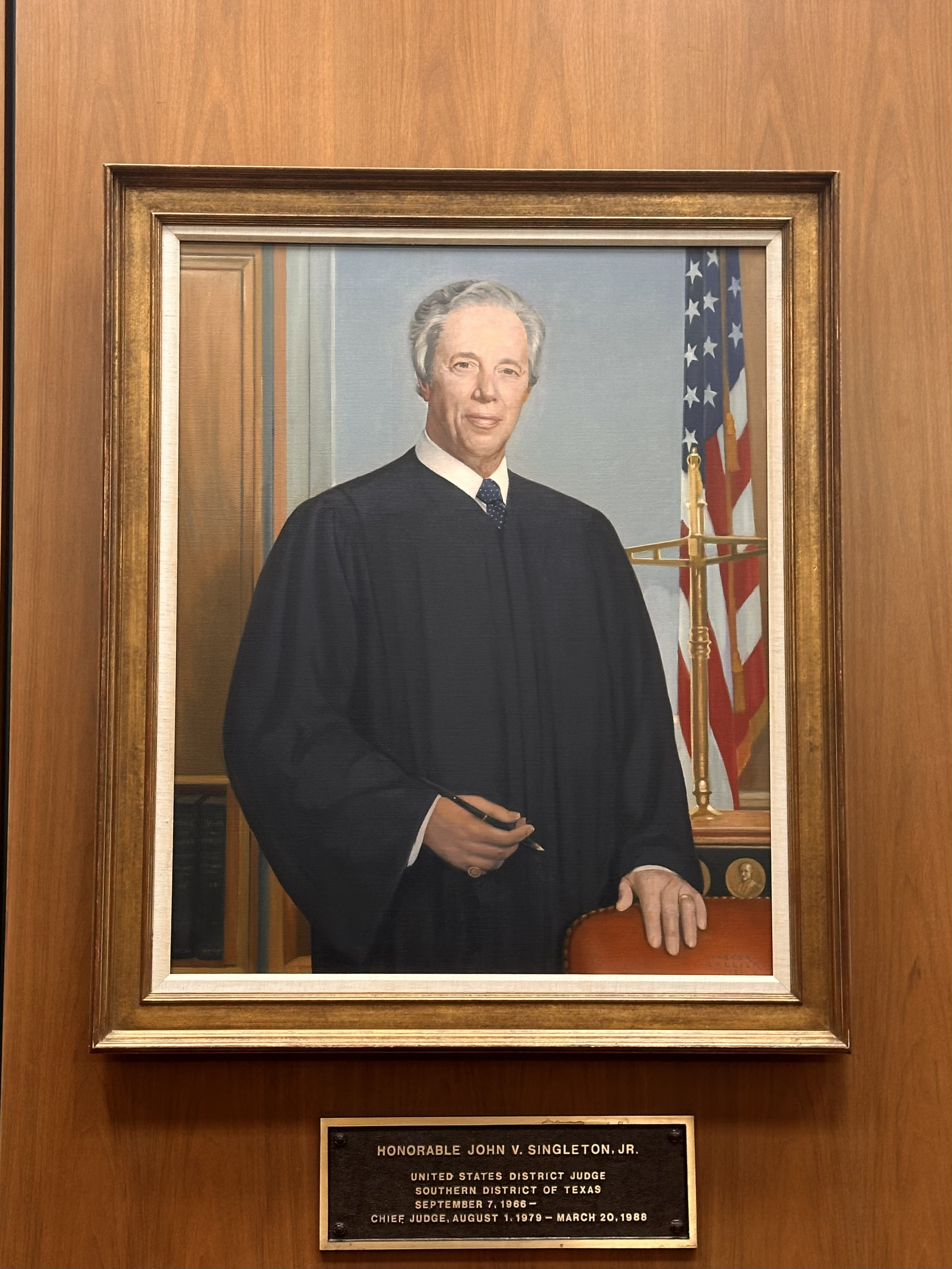
Portrait of Hon. John V. Singleton, Jr., which hangs in Courtroom 11A of the Bob Casey Federal Building in Houston, Texas.

== Education and career ==
Born in Kaufman, Texas, Singleton received a Bachelor of Arts degree from the University of Texas at Austin in 1942. While at UT, he was a member of the Texas Cowboys service organization. He then served in the United States Navy as a Lieutenant Commander from 1942 to 1946, working in the Veterans Administration and graduated from the Naval Justice School in 1948. He was in private practice in Houston, Texas from 1946 to 1966.

== Federal judicial service ==
On June 28, 1966, President Lyndon B. Johnson nominated Singleton to a new seat on the United States District Court for the Southern District of Texas created by 80 Stat. 75. He was confirmed by the United States Senate on July 22, 1966, and received his commission the same day. He served as Chief Judge from 1979 to 1988 and assumed senior status on April 1, 1988. He retired on June 1, 1992. He lived in the Lakes of Parkway community in western Houston, until his death on March 20, 2015, in Houston.

== Sources ==
Legal offices
Preceded by Seat established by 80 Stat. 75	Judge of the United States District Court for the Southern District of Texas; 1966–1988	Succeeded by Melinda Harmon
Preceded by Reynaldo Guerra Garza	Chief Judge of the United States District Court for the Southern District of Texas; 1979–1988	Succeeded by James DeAnda
