= United States District Court for the Southern District of Texas =

Coordinates: 29°45′40″N 95°22′3″W

- (S.D. Tex.)

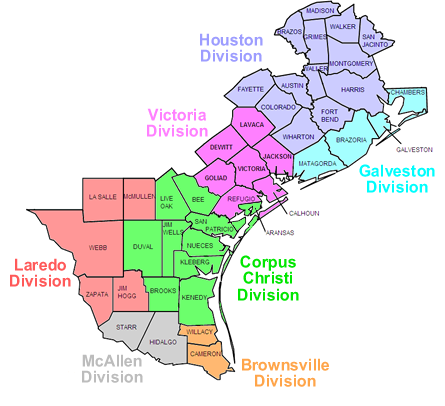
- Location: Houston More locations: Brownsville; College Station; Corpus Christi; Galveston United States Post Office and Courthouse (Galveston); Laredo; McAllen; Victoria
- Appeals to: Fifth Circuit
- Established: March 11, 1902
- Judges: 19
- Chief Judge: Randy Crane

Officers of the court
- U.S. Attorney: Aaron Reitz
- U.S. Marshal: T. Michael O'Connor
- www.txs.uscourts.gov

The United States District Court for the Southern District of Texas (in case citations, S.D. Tex.) is the federal district court with jurisdiction over the southeastern part of Texas. The court's headquarters is in Houston, Texas, and has six additional locations in the district.

Appeals from cases brought in the Southern District of Texas are taken to the United States Court of Appeals for the Fifth Circuit (except for patent claims and claims against the U.S. government under the Tucker Act, which are appealed to the Federal Circuit).

As of July 9, 2026, the United States attorney is Aaron Reitz.

Along with the Western District of Texas, District of New Mexico, and District of Arizona, it is one of the busiest district courts in terms of criminal felony filings.

== History ==
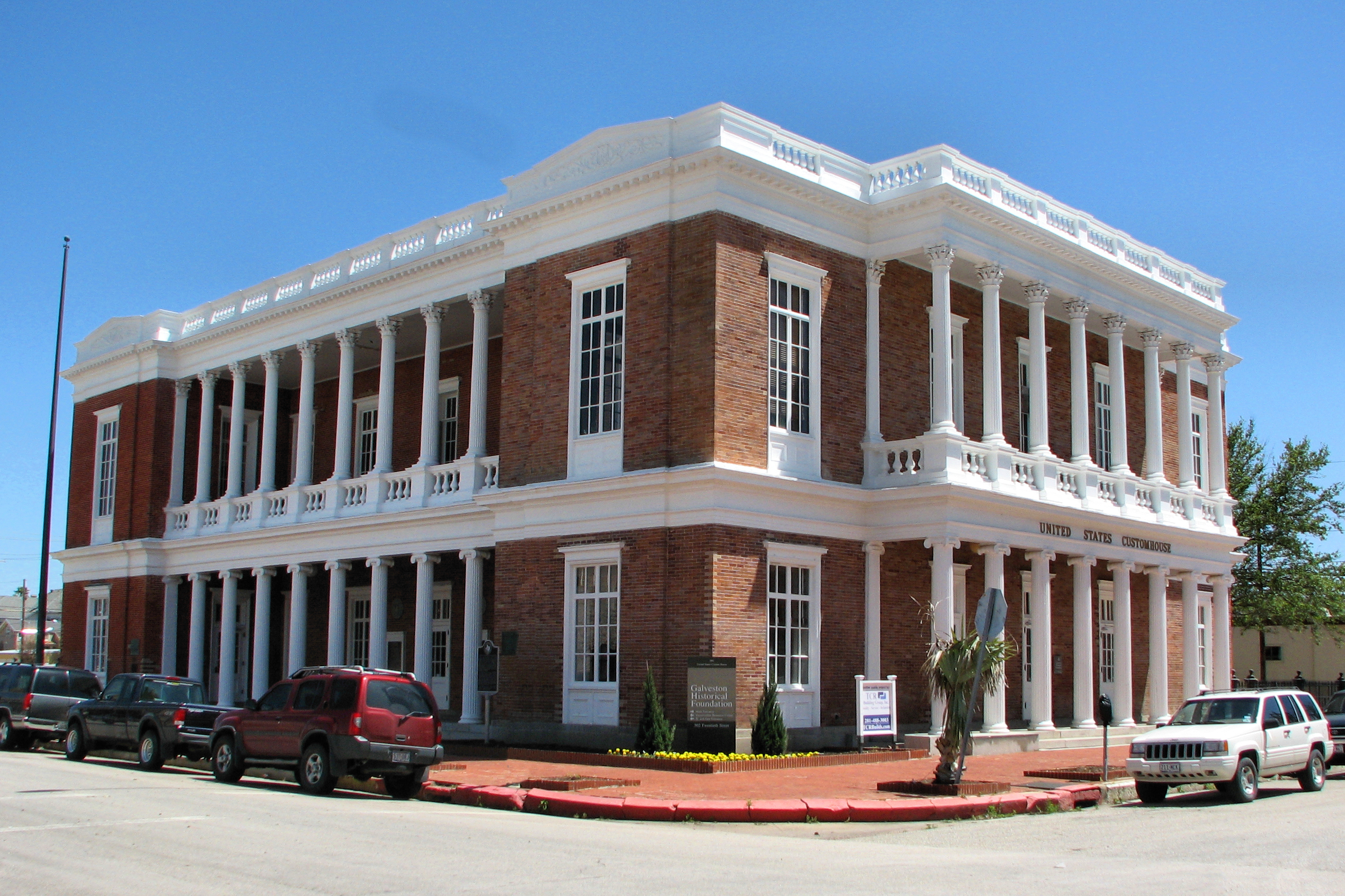
The oldest federal civil building in Texas, the 1861 Customs and Courthouse in Galveston, once housed the Southern District of Texas.

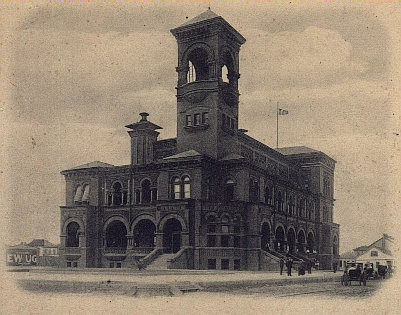
Federal Courthouse in Galveston that housed the court & its predecessor, from 1891–1917

Since its foundation, the Southern District of Texas has been served by forty-one District Judges and six Clerks of Court. The first federal judge in Texas was John C. Watrous, who was appointed on May 26, 1846, and had previously served as Attorney General of the Republic of Texas. He was assigned to hold court in Galveston, at the time, the largest city in the state. As seat of the Texas Judicial District, the Galveston court had jurisdiction over the whole state. On February 21, 1857, the state was divided into two districts, Eastern and Western, with Judge Watrous continuing in the Eastern district. Judge Watrous and Judge Thomas H. DuVal, of the Western District of Texas, left the state on the secession of Texas from the Union, the only two United States Judges not to resign their posts in states that seceded. When Texas was restored to the Union, Watrous and DuVal resumed their duties and served until 1870. Judge Amos Morrill served in the Eastern District of Texas from 1872 to 1884. He was succeeded by Chauncy B. Sabin (1884 to 1890) and David E. Bryant (1890 to 1902). In 1902, when the Southern District was created by Act of Congress, Judge Bryant continued to serve in the Eastern District of Texas.

In 1917, the General Services Administration added courtrooms and judicial offices to the second floor of the 1861 U.S. Customs House in Galveston, and it became the new federal courthouse for the Southern District of Texas. This location would later become the seat of the Galveston Division, after Congress added a second judgeship in the 1930s.

The Southern District of Texas started with one judge, Waller T. Burns, and a Clerk of Court, Christopher Dart, seated in Galveston. Since that time, the court has grown to nineteen district judgeships, six bankruptcy judgeships, fourteen magistrate judgeships, and over 200 deputy clerks.

=== Galveston Division ===
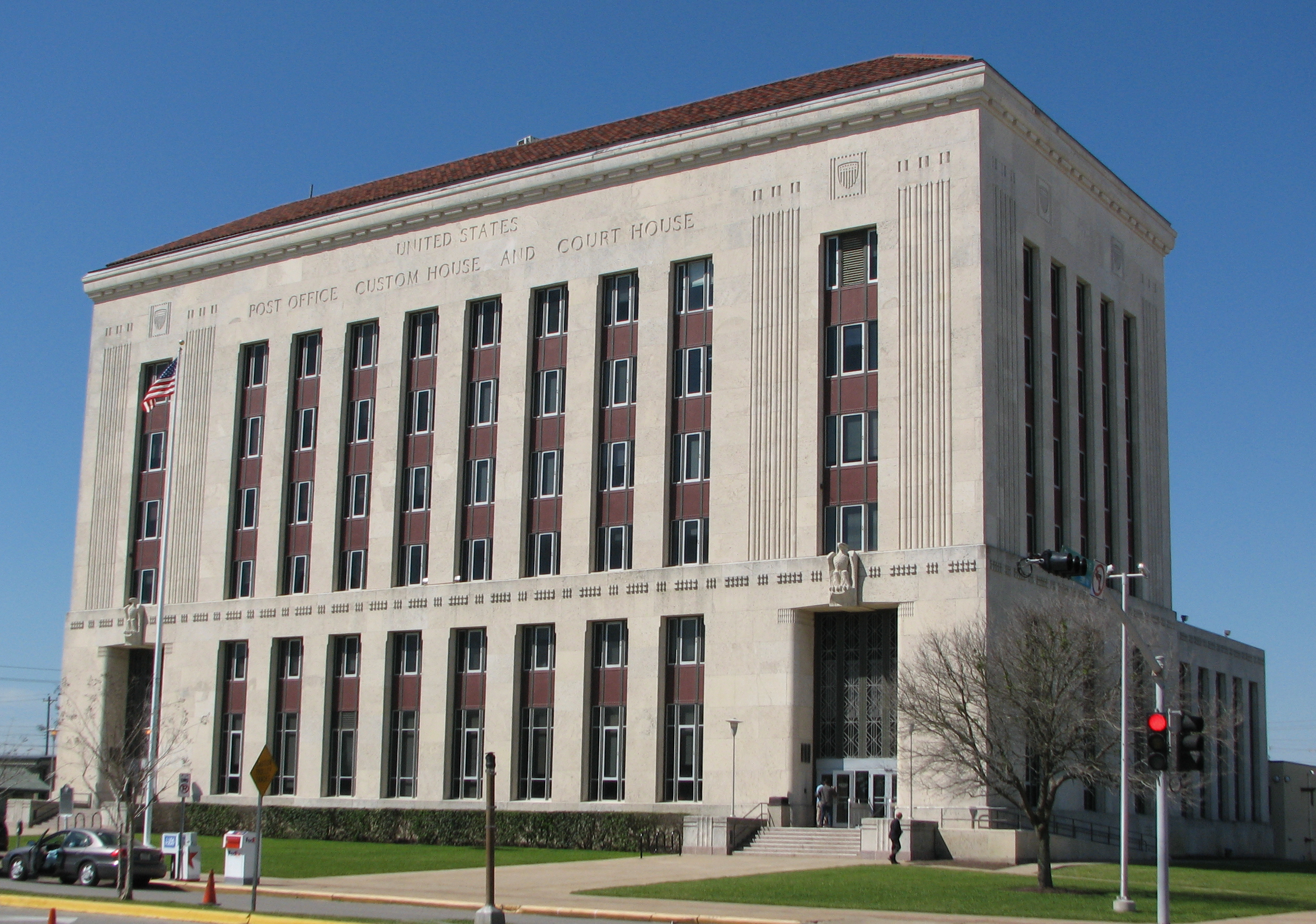
The U.S. federal building in Galveston, current home of the Galveston Division.

In 2007, criminal charges were filed against Judge Samuel B. Kent, the only District judge in the Galveston Division, who sat at the Federal Courthouse in Galveston, the oldest federal judgeship in the state. Due to the litigation, Chief Judge Hayden Head transferred Kent and his staff to the Houston Division. Judge Kent subsequently pleaded guilty, in February 2009, to obstruction of justice and, after being impeached by the House of Representatives, resigned in June 2009. The next month, it was announced that Judge Kent's post would remain vacant for the time being, and a replacement judge would be assigned to McAllen, due to the increase in cases in the Texas border area concerning subjects such as drugs and immigration.

=== Laredo Division ===
The United States Courthouse is the current home of the Laredo Division.

Laredo, Texas, is located on the northern bank of the Rio Grande River and is unique in its ability to operate international bridges between two Mexican states. The city presently maintains four border crossings and one rail bridge with the Mexican State of Tamaulipas at Nuevo Laredo and the Mexican State of Nuevo León at Colombia. Webb County also borders the State of Nuevo León and the State of Coahuila, Mexico, northwest of Laredo. Laredo is the largest inland port along the U.S.-Mexico border and the Pan American Highway leading into Mexico through Laredo stretches from Canada and continues into Central and South America. Because of its location and accessibility to Mexico, Laredo’s economy is primarily based on international trade with Mexico. According to the Laredo Development Foundation, more than 700 of the Fortune 1,000 companies do international business via Laredo and more than 9,000 trucks cross through town per day along with 1,800 loaded rail cars. Laredo is ranked first in growth in Texas and seventh in the country by the Milken Institute.

The division encompasses five counties with the federal courthouse located in Laredo, Texas. There are two Laredo district court judges—Judges Diana Saldaña and Marina Garcia Marmolejo, who presided over more than 2,000 felony cases in 2013—most of which involved charges of narcotics trafficking and alien smuggling. In addition, there are three federal magistrates who alternate duties every two weeks. Additionally, the federal grand jury convenes every other week where AUSAs rotate the responsibility of presenting felony cases.

== Jurisdiction ==
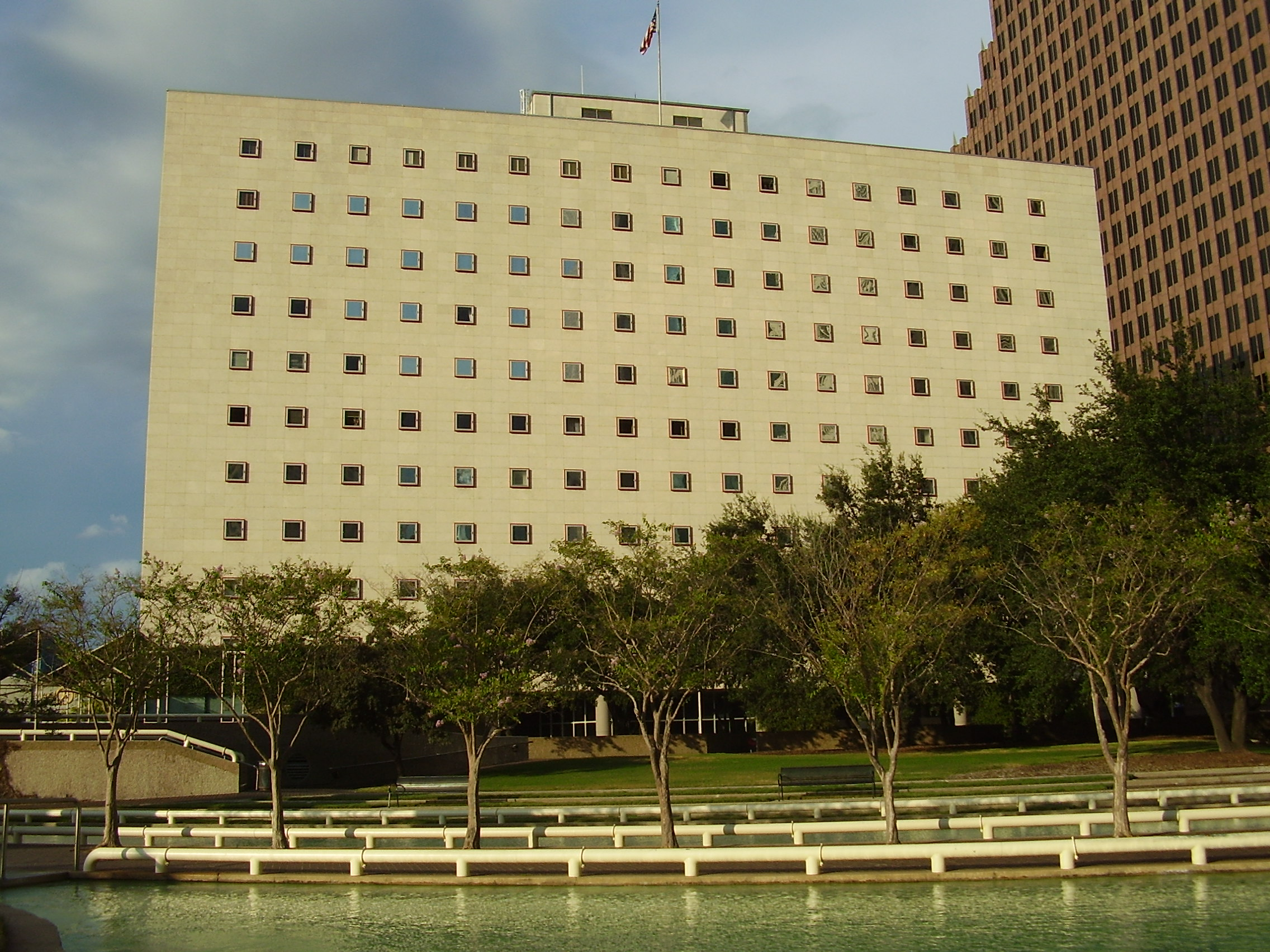
Bob Casey Federal Courthouse in Downtown Houston

The jurisdiction of the Southern District of Texas is divided as follows:

- The Brownsville Division covers Cameron and Willacy Counties.
- The Corpus Christi Division covers Aransas, Bee, Brooks, Duval, Jim Wells, Kenedy, Kleberg, Live Oak, Nueces, and San Patricio Counties.
- The Galveston Division covers Brazoria, Chambers, Galveston, and Matagorda Counties.
- The Houston Division covers Austin, Brazos, Colorado, Fayette, Fort Bend, Grimes, Harris, Madison, Montgomery, San Jacinto, Walker, Waller, and Wharton Counties.
- The Laredo Division covers Jim Hogg, La Salle, McMullen, Webb, and Zapata Counties.
- The McAllen Division covers Hidalgo and Starr Counties.
- The Victoria Division covers Calhoun, DeWitt, Goliad, Jackson, Lavaca, Refugio, and Victoria Counties.

== Current judges ==
As of November 20, 2026:

#	Title	Judge	Duty station	Born	Term of service			Appointed by
#	Title	Judge	Duty station	Born	Active	Chief	Senior	Appointed by
40	Chief Judge	Randy Crane	McAllen	1965	2002–present	2022–present	—	G.W. Bush
39	District Judge	Keith P. Ellison	Houston	1950	1999–present	—	—	Clinton
44	District Judge	Diana Saldaña	Laredo	1971	2011–present	—	—	Obama
45	District Judge	Nelva Gonzales Ramos	Corpus Christi	1965	2011–present	—	—	Obama
46	District Judge	Marina Garcia Marmolejo	Laredo	1971	2011–present	—	—	Obama
48	District Judge	Alfred H. Bennett	Houston	1965	2015–present	—	—	Obama
49	District Judge	George C. Hanks Jr.	Houston	1964	2015–present	—	—	Obama
50	District Judge	Rolando Olvera	Brownsville	1963	2015–present	—	—	Obama
51	District Judge	Fernando Rodriguez Jr.	Brownsville	1969	2018–present	—	—	Trump
52	District Judge	David S. Morales	Corpus Christi	1968	2019–present	—	—	Trump
53	District Judge	Jeff Brown	Galveston	1970	2019–present	—	—	Trump
54	District Judge	Charles R. Eskridge III	Houston	1963	2019–present	—	—	Trump
55	District Judge	Drew B. Tipton	Houston	1967	2020–present	—	—	Trump
56	District Judge	John A. Kazen	Laredo	1964	2024–present	—	—	Biden
57	District Judge	Nicholas Ganjei	Houston	1979	2026–present	—	—	Trump
58	District Judge	John Marck	McAllen	1982	2026–present	—	—	Trump
59	District Judge	Arthur R. Jones	McAllen	1969	2026–present	—	—	Trump
60	District Judge	Angela Colmenero	Houston	1979	2026–present	—	—	Trump
61	District Judge	vacant	—	—	—	—	—	—
24	Senior Judge	Hayden Wilson Head Jr.	inactive	1944	1981–2009	2003–2009	2009–present	Reagan
25	Senior Judge	Ricardo Hinojosa	inactive	1950	1983–2025	2009–2016	2025–present	Reagan
26	Senior Judge	Lynn Hughes	inactive	1941	1985–2023	—	2023–present	Reagan
27	Senior Judge	David Hittner	Houston	1939	1986–2004	—	2004–present	Reagan
28	Senior Judge	Kenneth M. Hoyt	Houston	1948	1988–2013	—	2013–present	Reagan
29	Senior Judge	Sim Lake	Houston	1944	1988–2019	—	2019–present	Reagan
30	Senior Judge	Melinda Harmon	inactive	1946	1989–2018	—	2018–present	G.H.W. Bush
31	Senior Judge	John David Rainey	Victoria	1945	1990–2010	—	2010–present	G.H.W. Bush
33	Senior Judge	Ewing Werlein Jr.	Houston	1936	1992–2006	—	2006–present	G.H.W. Bush
34	Senior Judge	Lee H. Rosenthal	Houston	1952	1992–2024	2016–2022	2024–present	G.H.W. Bush
35	Senior Judge	Janis Graham Jack	inactive	1946	1994–2011	—	2011–present	Clinton
38	Senior Judge	Hilda G. Tagle	inactive	1946	1998–2012	—	2012–present	Clinton
41	Senior Judge	Andrew Hanen	Houston	1953	2002–2025	—	2025–present	G.W. Bush
42	Senior Judge	Micaela Alvarez	San Antonio (Note: Judge Alvarez has sat with the Western District of Texas since 2025.)	1958	2004–2023	—	2023–present	G.W. Bush
43	Senior Judge	Gray H. Miller	inactive	1948	2006–2018	—	2018–present	G.W. Bush

== Vacancies and pending nominations ==
Seat	Prior judge's duty station	Seat last held by	Vacancy reason	Date of vacancy	Nominee	Date of nomination
3	Houston	Andrew Hanen	Senior status	January 2, 2025	Richard W. Bennett	September 14, 2026

== Former judges ==
#	Judge	Born–died	Active service	Chief Judge	Senior status	Appointed by	Reason for termination
1	Waller Thomas Burns	1858–1917	1902–1917	—	—	T. Roosevelt	death
2	Joseph Hutcheson Jr.	1879–1973	1918–1931	—	—	Wilson	elevation
3	Thomas Martin Kennerly	1874–1962	1931–1954	—	1954–1962	Hoover	death
4	James Burr V Allred	1899–1959	1939–1942	—	—	F. Roosevelt	resignation
4.1	James Burr V Allred	1899–1959	1949–1959	—	—	Truman	death
5	Allen Burroughs Hannay	1892–1983	1942–1975	1954–1962	1975–1983	F. Roosevelt	death
6	Ben Clarkson Connally	1909–1975	1949–1974	1962–1974	1974–1975	Truman	death
7	Joe McDonald Ingraham	1903–1990	1954–1969	—	—	Eisenhower	elevation
8	Reynaldo Guerra Garza	1915–2004	1961–1979	1974–1979	—	Kennedy	elevation
9	James Latane Noel Jr.	1909–1997	1961–1976 (Note: Recess appointment; formally nominated on January 15, 1962, confirmed by the United States Senate on March 16, 1962, and received commission on March 17, 1962.)	—	1976–1997	Kennedy	death
10	John Virgil Singleton Jr.	1918–2015	1966–1988	1979–1988	1988–1992	L. Johnson	retirement
11	Woodrow Bradley Seals	1917–1990	1966–1982	—	1982–1990	L. Johnson	death
12	Carl Olaf Bue Jr.	1922–2020	1970–1987	—	1987–2020	Nixon	death
13	Owen DeVol Cox	1910–1990	1970–1981	—	1981–1990	Nixon	death
14	Robert J. O'Conor Jr.	1934–2023	1975–1984	—	—	Ford	resignation
15	Ross N. Sterling	1931–1988	1976–1988	—	—	Ford	death
16	Finis E. Cowan	1929–2023	1977–1979	—	—	Carter	resignation
17	George Edward Cire	1922–1985	1979–1985	—	—	Carter	death
18	James DeAnda	1925–2006	1979–1992	1988–1992	—	Carter	retirement
19	Norman William Black	1931–1997	1979–1996	1992–1996	1996–1997	Carter	death
20	George P. Kazen	1940–2021	1979–2009	1996–2003	2009–2018	Carter	retirement
21	Gabrielle Kirk McDonald	1942–present	1979–1988	—	—	Carter	resignation
22	Hugh Gibson	1918–1998	1979–1989	—	1989–1998	Carter	death
23	Filemon Bartolome Vela	1935–2004	1980–2000	—	2000–2004	Carter	death
32	Samuel B. Kent	1949–present	1990–2009	—	—	G.H.W. Bush	resignation
36	Vanessa Gilmore	1956–present	1994–2022	—	—	Clinton	retirement
37	Nancy Atlas	1949–present	1995–2014	—	2014–2022	Clinton	retirement
47	Gregg Costa	1972–present	2012–2014	—	—	Obama	elevation

== Chief judges ==
Chief judges have administrative responsibilities with respect to their district court. Unlike the Supreme Court, where one justice is specifically nominated to be chief, the office of chief judge rotates among the district court judges. To be chief, a judge must have been in active service on the court for at least one year, be under the age of 65, and have not previously served as chief judge.

A vacancy is filled by the judge highest in seniority among the group of qualified judges. The chief judge serves for a term of seven years, or until age 70, whichever occurs first. The age restrictions are waived if no members of the court would otherwise be qualified for the position.

When the office was created in 1948, the chief judge was the longest-serving judge who had not elected to retire, on what has since 1958 been known as senior status, or declined to serve as chief judge. After August 6, 1959, judges could not become or remain chief after turning 70 years old. The current rules have been in operation since October 1, 1982.

== Succession of seats ==
Seat 1
Seat established on March 11, 1902 by 32 Stat. 64
Burns	1902–1917
Hutcheson Jr.	1918–1931
Kennerly	1931–1954
Ingraham	1954–1969
Bue Jr.	1970–1987
Hoyt	1988–2013
A. Bennett	2015–present

Seat 2
Seat established on May 31, 1938 by 52 Stat. 584
Allred	1939–1942
Hannay	1942–1975
Sterling	1976–1988
Lake III	1988–2019
Tipton	2020–present

Seat 3
Seat established on August 3, 1949 by 63 Stat. 493
Allred	1949–1959
Garza	1961–1979
Vela Sr.	1980–2000
Hanen	2002–2025
vacant	2025–present

Seat 4
Seat established on August 3, 1949 by 63 Stat. 493 (temporary)
Seat made permanent on February 10, 1954 by 68 Stat. 8
Connally	1949–1974
O'Conor Jr.	1975–1984
Hughes	1985–2023
Ganjei	2026–present

Seat 5
Seat established on May 19, 1961 by 75 Stat. 80
Noel Jr.	1962–1976
Cowan	1977–1979
Gibson	1979–1989
Kent	1990–2009
Marmolejo	2011–present

Seat 6
Seat established on March 18, 1966 by 80 Stat. 75
Singleton Jr.	1966–1988
Harmon	1989–2018
Brown	2019–present

Seat 7
Seat established on March 18, 1966 by 80 Stat. 75
Seals	1966–1982
Hinojosa	1983–2025
Jones	2026–present

Seat 8
Seat established on June 2, 1970 by 84 Stat. 294
Cox	1970–1981
Head Jr.	1981–2009
Ramos	2011–present

Seat 9
Seat established on October 20, 1978 by 92 Stat. 1629
Cire	1979–1985
Hittner	1986–2004
Alvarez	2004–2023
Marck	2026–present

Seat 10
Seat established on October 20, 1978 by 92 Stat. 1629
DeAnda	1979–1992
Atlas	1995–2014
Hanks Jr.	2015–present

Seat 11
Seat established on October 20, 1978 by 92 Stat. 1629
Black	1979–1996
Ellison	1999–present

Seat 12
Seat established on October 20, 1978 by 92 Stat. 1629
McDonald	1979–1988
Rainey	1990–2010
Costa	2012–2014
Rodriguez Jr.	2018–present

Seat 13
Seat established on October 20, 1978 by 92 Stat. 1629
G. Kazen	1979–2009
Saldaña	2011–present

Seat 14
Seat established on December 1, 1990 by 104 Stat. 5089
Werlein Jr.	1992–2006
Miller	2006–2018
Eskridge III	2019–present

Seat 15
Seat established on December 1, 1990 by 104 Stat. 5089
Rosenthal	1992–2024
Colmenero	2026–present

Seat 16
Seat established on December 1, 1990 by 104 Stat. 5089
Jack	1994–2011
Morales	2019–present

Seat 17
Seat established on December 1, 1990 by 104 Stat. 5089
Gilmore	1994–2022
J. Kazen	2024–present

Seat 18
Seat established on December 1, 1990 by 104 Stat. 5089
Tagle	1998–2012
Olvera	2015–present

Seat 19
Seat established on December 21, 2000 by 114 Stat. 2762
Crane	2002–present

== List of U.S. attorneys ==
- Marcus C. McLemore 1902–1906
- Lodowick McDaniel 1906–1914
- John Edward Green Jr. 1914–1919
- David Edward Simmons 1919–1922
- Henry Matthews Holden 1922–1934
- Douglas Wear McGregor 1934–1944
- Brian Sylvester Odem 1944–1954
- Malcolm Richard Wilkey 1954–1957
- William B. Butler 1957–1961
- Woodrow Bradley Seals 1961–1966
- Morton Lee Susman 1966–1969
- Anthony Perez Farris 1969–1974
- Edward B. McDonough Jr. 1974–1977
- Jose Antonio Canales 1977–1980
- Daniel Kuldell Hedges 1981–1985
- Henry K. Oncken 1985–1990
- Ronald G. Woods 1990–1993
- Gaynelle Griffin Jones 1993–1997
- Mervyn Milton Mosbacker 1999–2001
- Michael T. Shelby 2001–2005
- Donald J. DeGabrielle 2006–2008
- Kenneth Magidson 2011–2017
- Ryan Patrick 2018–2021
- Alamdar S. Hamdani 2022–2025
- Nicholas Ganjei 2025–2026
- John Marck 2026
- Aaron Reitz 2026–present

== See also ==
- Courts of Texas
- List of current United States district judges
- List of United States federal courthouses in Texas
