= Janis Graham Jack =

American judge (born 1946)

Senior Judge of the United States District Court for the Southern District of Texas
- In office June 1, 2011 – October 14, 2025

Judge of the United States District Court for the Southern District of Texas
- In office March 11, 1994 – June 1, 2011
- Appointed by: Bill Clinton
- Preceded by: Seat established by 104 Stat. 5089
- Succeeded by: David S. Morales

Personal details
- Born: Janis Ann Graham Jack; May 28, 1946 (age 80) Los Angeles, California, U.S.
- Education: University of St. Thomas (Nursing Diploma); University of Baltimore (BA); South Texas College of Law (JD)

Janis Ann Graham Jack (born May 28, 1946) is an American lawyer who serves as a senior United States district judge of the United States District Court for the Southern District of Texas.

== Education and career ==
Jack was born in Los Angeles. She received a registered nursing diploma from St. Thomas School of Nursing (part of the University of St. Thomas) in 1969, a Bachelor of Arts degree in sociology from the University of Baltimore in 1974, and a Juris Doctor from South Texas College of Law in 1981. She was in private practice in Corpus Christi, Texas from 1981 to 1993.

=== Federal judicial service ===
On November 19, 1993, Jack was nominated by President Bill Clinton to a new seat on the United States District Court for the Southern District of Texas created by 104 Stat. 5089. She was confirmed by the United States Senate on March 10, 1994, and received her commission on March 11, 1994. She assumed senior status on June 1, 2011. Jack left the court on October 14, 2025.

=== Notable rulings ===
In June 2005, Jack threw out about 9,000 suits against US Silica corp.

In 2015, Jack ruled in favor of plaintiffs in a class action suit (M.D. v. Abbott) on behalf of 10,000-plus foster children in care of the State of Texas, saying leaders were violating the constitutional rights of the children in its long-term foster care. With much of her ruling sustained on appeal, Jack continues to supervise the case as late as 2024, holding the State in contempt of court and often expressing "disgust" at the State of Texas’ failure to care for foster children. On October 11, 2024, however, the United States Court of Appeals for the Fifth Circuit reversed her contempt order, held that the State of Texas had substantially complied with her previous orders, and removed her from the case.

Legal offices
Preceded by Seat established by 104 Stat. 5089	Judge of the United States District Court for the Southern District of Texas; 1994–2011	Succeeded by David S. Morales
