= Mayes Middleton =

American politician

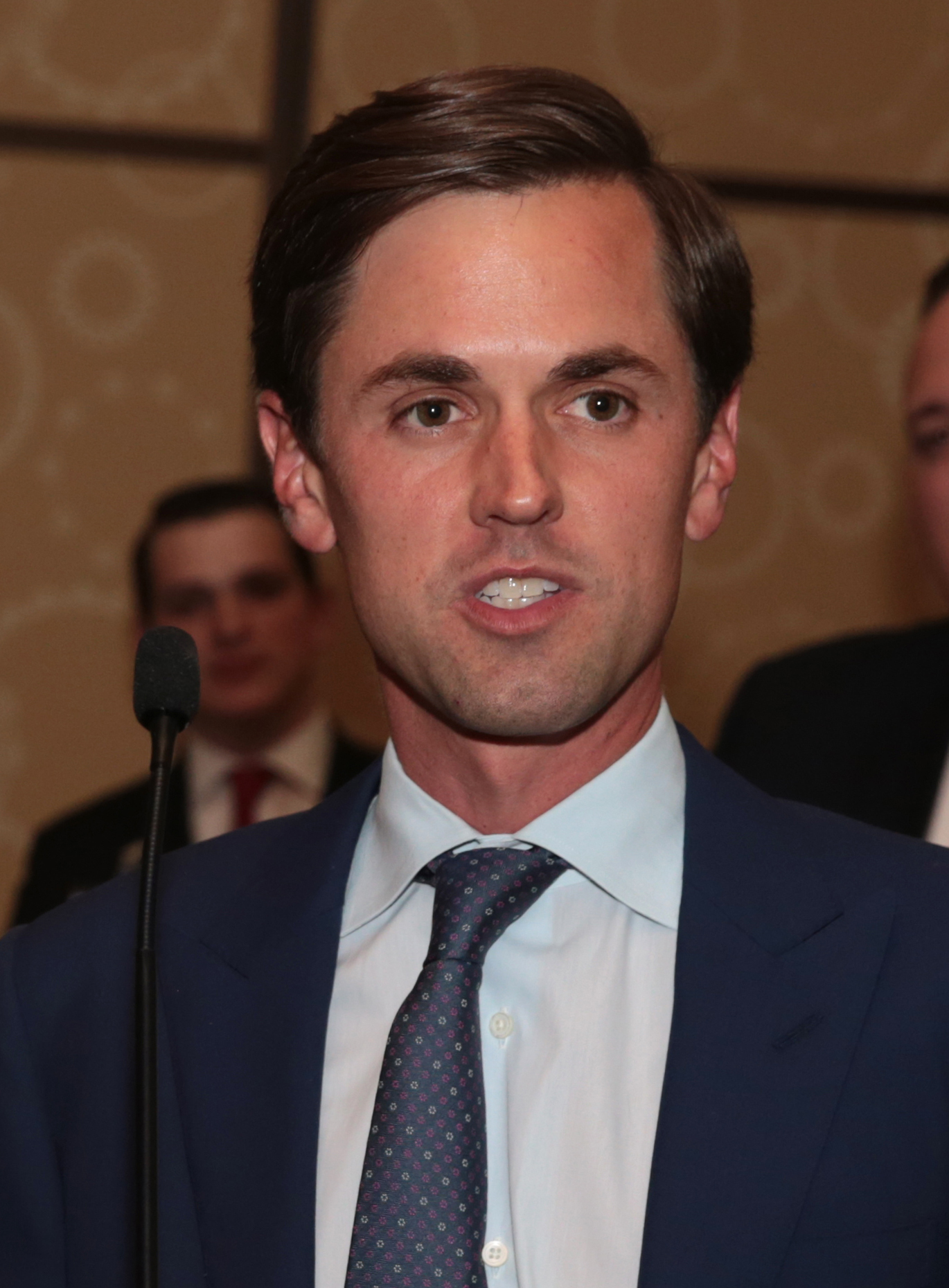
- Middleton in 2018

Member of the Texas Senate from the 11th district
- Incumbent
- Assumed office January 10, 2023
- Preceded by: Larry Taylor

Member of the Texas House of Representatives from the 23rd district
- In office January 8, 2019 – January 10, 2023
- Preceded by: Wayne Faircloth
- Succeeded by: Terri Leo-Wilson

Personal details
- Born: David Mayes Middleton II; September 18, 1981 (age 45) Wallisville, Texas, U.S.
- Party: Republican
- Spouse: Macy Middleton
- Children: 4
- Education: University of Texas, Austin (BA, JD)
- Website: State Senate website; Campaign website

David Mayes Middleton II (born September 18, 1981) is an American businessman and politician serving as a member of the Texas Senate for the 11th district. Previously, he served as a Texas House of Representatives for district 23. A member of the Republican Party, Middleton has been in the Texas legislature since January 8, 2019. He was the Republican nominee for Texas Attorney General in the 2026 election, losing to fellow state senator and Democrat Nathan Johnson.

== Early life and education ==
David Mayes Middleton II was born in Wallisville, Texas, an unincorporated town in northern Chambers County, Texas. Middleton's father, John Gregg Middleton, named his son after his deceased brother, David Mayes Middleton. Middleton graduated from The Kinkaid School in Houston, Texas, and received a degree in finance from the University of Texas at Austin, and a Juris Doctor from University of Texas Law School.

== Business career ==
Middleton serves as president of Middleton Oil Company, an independent oil and gas company that operates in South Texas and the Gulf Coast. Middleton Oil Company currently claims three employees, and generates an estimated annual revenue of ~$800,000. Middleton owns and manages ranching, cattle, and farming operations in Chambers, Jefferson, Kimble, Liberty, and Webb Counties. He serves on the Board of Directors of First Liberty National Bank, a community bank with locations in the Texas cities of Baytown, China, Dayton, Hardin, Huffman, and Liberty.

== Political career ==
Middleton served in the Texas House of Representatives for district 23. At one time, he was Chairman of the Texas Freedom Caucus.

=== Texas House of Representatives ===
Middleton was first elected to the Texas House of Representatives in November 2018 Middleton was re-elected in 2020.

2018

In the 2018 primary election, he successfully challenged two-term incumbent representative Wayne Faircloth, an ally of House Speaker Joe Straus. In the November 6, 2018, general election Middleton defeated Democrat Amanda Jamrok.

2020

Middleton ran unopposed in the Republican primary election held on March 3, 2020. He defeated Democrat Jeff Antonelli in the 2020 general election.

==== House committee assignments ====
- 87th legislative session
  - Insurance
  - Judiciary & Civil Jurisprudence
  - Local & Consent Calendars
  - State Water Implementation Fund for Texas Advisory
  - Texas Infrastructure Resiliency Fund Advisory
- 86th legislative session
  - Co-chair, Coastal Barrier System
  - Elections
  - Local & Consent Calendars
  - Urban Affairs

==== Senate committee assignments ====
- 88th legislative session
  - Administration
  - Business & Commerce
  - Committee of the Whole Senate
  - Education
  - Vice Chair, Subcommittee on Higher Education
  - Jurisprudence
  - State Affairs

=== 2022 Texas Senate race ===
On November 30, 2021, Middleton filed to run for the Texas Senate for district 11.

On December 28, 2021, Middleton announced the endorsement of former US president Donald Trump. In a statement endorsing Middleton's senate race, Trump called Middleton "a very effective leader in the Texas House" and said his "voting record on conservative issues is second to none," closing by writing, "I am proud to give my Complete and Total Endorsement to a MAGA champion, Mayes Middleton."

Middleton was elected without opposition in the 2022 general election.

=== 2026 Texas Attorney General race ===
In April 2025, Middleton announced his campaign to run for Texas attorney general in the 2026 election. As incumbent Ken Paxton was retiring to run for U.S. Senate, the open seat drew several other challengers in the Republican primary including U.S. representative Chip Roy, fellow state senator Joan Huffman, and former U.S. assistant attorney general Aaron Reitz. Middleton placed first in the Republican primary election with 39.1% of the vote and advanced to a runoff election against Roy, who placed second with 31.6% of the vote. Middleton's campaign significantly aligned with Donald Trump and the MAGA movement, (Note: Middleton has been dubbed "MAGA Mayes", a moniker that he included in his campaign.) ultimately drawing endorsements from Reitz following the primary, Dan Patrick, Briscoe Cain, and Riley Gaines among other conservative figures. Middleton ultimately defeated Roy in the runoff with 55.2% to 44.8% of the vote.

In the November general election, Middleton lost by a considerable margin to Democratic state senator Nathan Johnson.

== Personal life ==
He and his wife, Macy, have four children. He is a Christian. The Middleton family currently resides in a home located on the east-end of Galveston Island. The Middleton family also own a home in Wallisville, Texas, built by Middleton's great-grandparents in 1905.

He serves on the board of directors of the Wallisville Heritage Park, a historical museum in Chambers County, Texas.

Middleton is a former member of the board of directors of the Texas Public Policy Foundation (TPPF). He was elected to the board in January 2016, but had to relinquish his seat in June 2017 when he announced his candidacy for the Texas House of Representatives due to a requirement in the foundation's bylaws.

In 2017, he served as a member of the executive committee for the Texas Business Leadership Council, a 501(c)(6) nonprofit organization of Texas-based CEOs and business executives that advocates for free enterprise public policies in Texas government.

== Notes ==
Party political offices
Preceded by Ken Paxton	Republican nominee for Attorney General of Texas; 2026	Most recent
