= Kenneth Magidson =

American lawyer

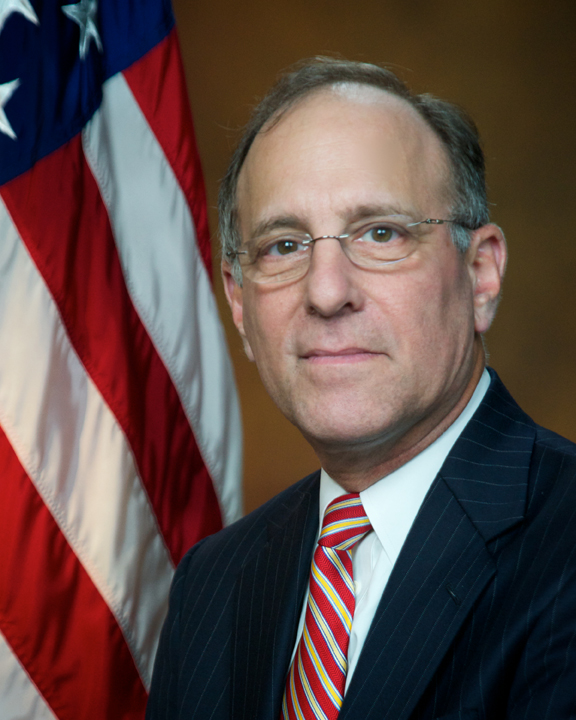

United States Attorney for the Southern District of Texas
- In office September 30, 2011 – March 10, 2017
- President: Barack Obama; Donald Trump
- Preceded by: José Angel Moreno (acting)
- Succeeded by: Ryan Patrick

District Attorney of Harris County, Texas
- In office March 14, 2008 – December 31, 2008
- Preceded by: Chuck Rosenthal
- Succeeded by: Pat Lykos

Personal details
- Born: April 4, 1948 (age 77)
- Political party: Democratic
- Education: University of Maryland; South Texas College of Law (JD)

Kenneth Magidson (born April 4, 1948) is an American attorney who served as the interim Harris County District Attorney in 2008 and as United States Attorney for the Southern District of Texas from 2011 to 2017.

== See also ==
- 2017 dismissal of U.S. attorneys
