= 2026 Texas Attorney General election =

- November 3, 2026
- Reporting: 99% as of 8:45 CST
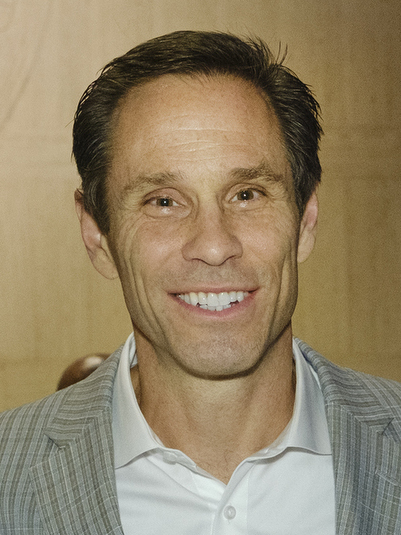

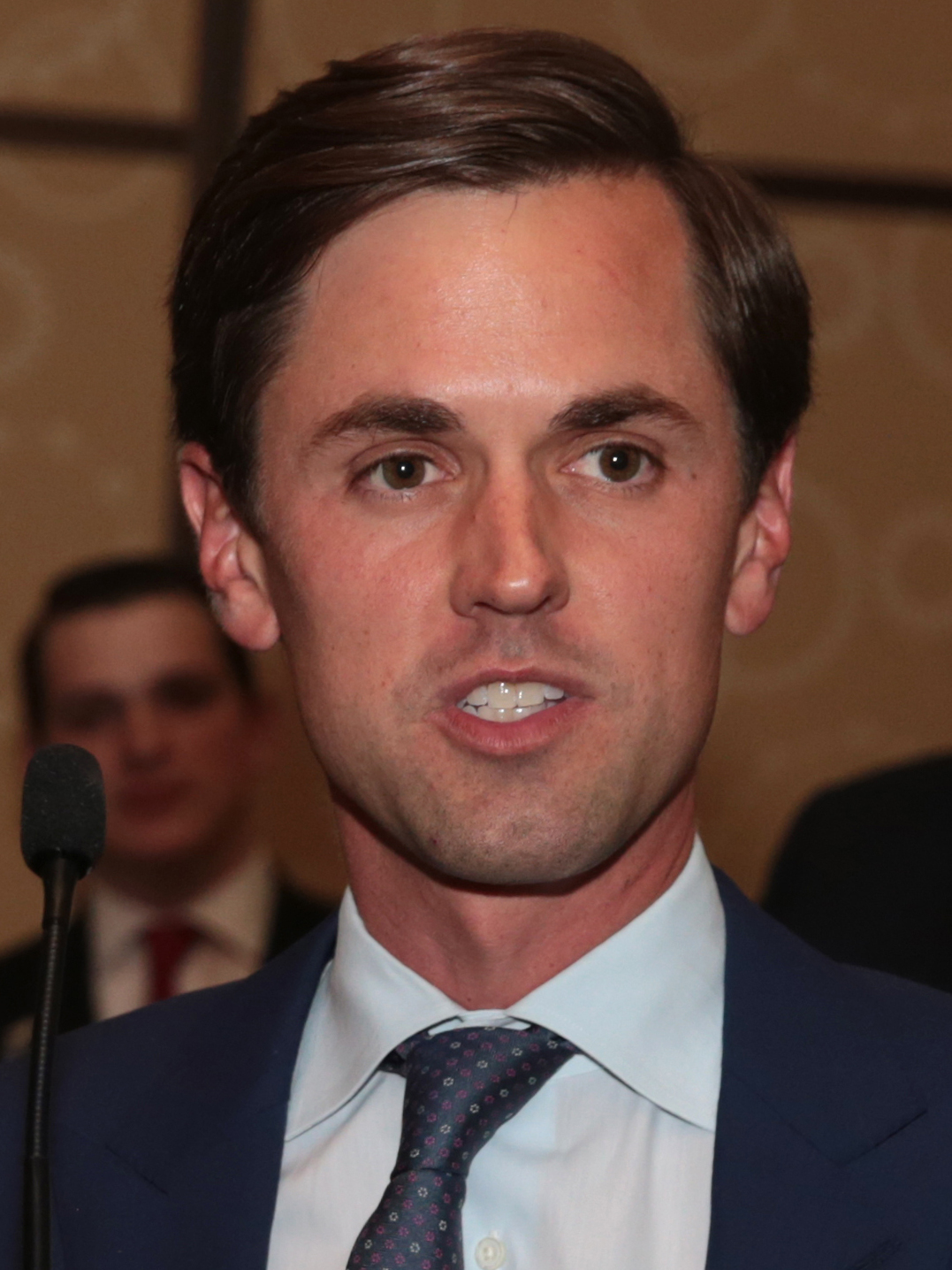
Nominee	Nathan Johnson	Mayes Middleton
Party	Democratic	Republican
Popular vote	5,135,525	4,503,855
Percentage	52.4%	45.9%
- Johnson: 40–50% 50–60% 60–70% 70–80% Middleton: 40–50% 50–60% 60–70% 70–80% 80–90% >90%
Attorney General before election
Ken Paxton
Republican
Elected Attorney General
Nathan Johnson
Democratic

The 2026 Texas Attorney General election took place on November 3, 2026, to elect the attorney general of Texas. Incumbent Republican attorney general Ken Paxton declined to seek re-election to a fourth term, running for the U.S. senate against incumbent John Cornyn in the primary, and Democratic nominee James Talarico in the general election. Primary elections were held on March 3, and primary runoffs were held on May 26. Republicans nominated State Senator Mayes Middleton, while the Democrats nominated state senator Nathan Johnson.

Nathan Johnson won the election becoming the first Democratic attorney general since 1994.

== Republican primary ==
=== Campaign ===
The Republican primary was heavily contested. This was the first race since 2014 which did not feature an incumbent, with Republicans having won every Attorney General election since 1998. The primary ultimately consisted of State Senators Mayes Middleton and Joan Huffman, Congressman Chip Roy, and former DOJ employee Aaron Reitz. None of the candidates reached 50% in the primary resulting in a runoff between Middleton and Roy. The race became notable for the amount of money being raised and spent on a down ballot race. Each candidate tried to make themselves out as the most conservative option and accused their opponents of being "Republican in Name Only". Middleton ultimately won the campaign by aligning himself completely with the Trump administration, branding himself "MAGA Mayes Middleton".

=== Candidates ===
==== Nominee ====
- Mayes Middleton, state senator from the 11th district (2023–present)

==== Eliminated in runoff ====
- Chip Roy, U.S. representative from Texas's 21st congressional district (2019–2027)

==== Eliminated in primary ====
- Joan Huffman, state senator from the 17th district (2008–present)
- Aaron Reitz, former U.S. Assistant Attorney General for the Office of Legal Policy (2025) (endorsed Middleton in the runoff)

==== Withdrawn ====
- John Bash, former U.S. Attorney for the Western District of Texas (2017–2020)

==== Declined ====
- Brian Harrison, state representative from the 10th district (2021–present) and candidate for Texas's 6th congressional district in 2021 (running for re-election)
- Bryan Hughes, state senator from the 1st district (2017–present)
- Eric Johnson, mayor of Dallas (2019–present)
- Mitch Little, state representative from the 65th district (2025–present) (running for re-election)
- Ken Paxton, incumbent attorney general (ran for U.S. Senate, endorsed Reitz)
- Matt Rinaldi, former chair of the Texas Republican Party (2021–2024) and former state representative from the 115th district (2015–2019)

=== Endorsements ===
Mayes Middleton

Executive branch officials

- Aaron Reitz, former U.S. Assistant Attorney General for the Office of Legal Policy (2025), former candidate

Statewide officials

- Dan Patrick, Lieutenant Governor of Texas (2015–2027)

U.S. representatives

- Brian Babin, TX-36 (2015–present)
- Lance Gooden, TX-05 (2019–present)
- Randy Weber, TX-14 (2013–present)

State legislators

- Brent Hagenbuch, state senator from the 30th district (2025–present)
- Adam Hinojosa, state senator from the 27th district (2025–present)
- Angela Paxton, state senator from the 8th district (2019–present)
- Briscoe Cain, state representative from the 128th district (2017–present)
- Brian Harrison, state representative from the 10th district (2021–present)

Individuals

- Riley Gaines, conservative activist

Organizations

- Young Conservatives of Texas (co-endorsement with Roy)
Chip Roy

Executive branch officials

- Mark Meadows, former White House Chief of Staff (2020–2021)

U.S. senators

- Ted Cruz, Texas (2013–present)
- Mike Lee, Utah (2011–present)

U.S. representatives

- Jodey Arrington, TX-19 (2017–present)
- Lauren Boebert, CO-04 (2021–2027)
- Michael Cloud, TX-27 (2018–present)
- Byron Donalds, FL-19 (2021–2027)
- Matt Gaetz, former FL-01 (2017–2024)
- Brandon Gill, TX-26 (2025–present)
- Ronny Jackson, TX-13 (2021–present)
- Keith Self, TX-03 (2023–present)
- Pete Sessions, TX-17 (2021–present)
- Beth Van Duyne, TX-24 (2021–present)

Organizations

- Gun Owners of Texas
- Students for Life of America
- Young Conservatives of Texas (co-endorsement with Middleton)

Newspapers

- Fort Worth Star-Telegram
Aaron Reitz (eliminated in first round)

Statewide officials

- Ken Paxton, attorney general of Texas (2015–2027)

Labor unions

- National Border Patrol Council

Organizations

- Conservative Political Action Committee
- Remembrance Project
- Republicans for National Renewal
Joan Huffman (eliminated in first round)

Labor unions

- Combined Law Enforcement Associations of Texas

Newspapers

- Austin American-Statesman
- Dallas Morning News
- Houston Chronicle
- San Antonio Express-News

=== Fundraising ===
Campaign finance Reports as of December 31, 2025
Candidate	Raised	Spent	Cash on hand
Joan Huffman (R)	$512,017	$865,632	$2,718,093
Mayes Middleton (R)	$11,819,827	$7,133,607	$5,098,210
Aaron Reitz (R)	$1,658,444	$1,045,705	$2,953,221
Chip Roy (R)	$4,500,000	$1,224,264	$4,272,044
Source: Texas Ethics Commission

=== Debates and forums ===
2026 Texas Attorney General Republican primary debates
No.	Date	Host	Moderator	Link	Participants			
P Participant A Absent N Non-invitee I Invitee W Withdrawn								
P Participant A Absent N Non-invitee I Invitee W Withdrawn					Huffman	Middleton	Reitz	Roy
1	February 17, 2026	Republican Attorneys General Association	Allie Beth Stuckey	WFAA	P	P	P	P

=== Polling ===
Poll source	Date(s) administered	Sample size (Note: Key: A – all adults RV – registered voters LV – likely voters V – unclear)	Margin of error	Joan Huffman	Mayes Middleton	Aaron Reitz	Chip Roy	Other	Undecided
Blueprint Polling (D)	February 23–24, 2026	529 (LV)	± 5.3%	11%	26%	11%	30%	3% (Note: "Do not remember" with 2%; "Did not vote in this race" with 1%)	19%
UT Tyler	February 13–22, 2026	– (LV)	–	21%	26%	9%	36%	–	8%
UT Tyler	February 13–22, 2026	– (RV)	–	21%	27%	10%	34%	–	8%
University of Texas/ Texas Politics Project	February 2–16, 2026	292 (LV)	± 5.7%	9%	38%	5%	40%	8% (Note: "Someone else" with 8%)	–
University of Houston/YouGov	January 20–31, 2026	550 (LV)	± 4.2%	13%	23%	6%	33%	–	25%
Pulse Decision Science (R) (Note: Poll sponsored by Roy's campaign)	December 14–17, 2025	800 (LV)	± 3.5%	10%	9%	6%	49%	–	26%
Pulse Decision Science (R)	November 2–5, 2025	800 (LV)	± 3.5%	13%	13%	7%	40%	–	27%
University of Houston/ Texas Southern University	September 19 – October 1, 2025	576 (RV)	± 4.1%	12%	3%	8%	40%	–	37%
co/efficient (R) (Note: Poll sponsored by Reitz's campaign)	August 27–30, 2025	800 (LV)	± 3.5%	8%	4%	7%	24%	–	58%
Pulse Decision Science (R)	August 27–30, 2025	800 (LV)	± 3.5%	4%	4%	3%	38%	–	50%
Texas Southern University	August 6–12, 2025	1,500 (LV)	± 2.5%	12%	8%	7%	–	–	73%

First round results by county: Middleton: 20–30% 30–40% 40–50% 50–60% 60–70% 70–80%; Roy: 20–30% 30–40% 40–50% 50–60% 70–80%; Huffman: 30–40%; Reitz: 20–30%

=== Results ===
Republican primary
Party	Candidate	Votes	%
Republican	Mayes Middleton	811,171	39.1
Republican	Chip Roy	655,064	31.6
Republican	Joan Huffman	312,998	15.1
Republican	Aaron Reitz	293,698	14.2
Total votes		2,072,931	100.0

=== Runoff ===
==== Polling ====
Poll source	Date(s) administered	Sample size	Margin of error	Mayes Middleton	Chip Roy	Other	Undecided
University of Houston	April 28 – May 1, 2026	1,200 (LV)	± 2.83%	48%	39%	–	13%

==== Results ====
Runoff results by county: Middleton: 50–60% 60–70% 70–80%; Roy: 50–60% 60–70% 100%; Tie: 50%

Republican primary runoff results
Party	Candidate	Votes	%
Republican	Mayes Middleton	757,625	55.2
Republican	Chip Roy	614,009	44.8
Total votes		1,371,634	100.0

== Democratic primary ==
=== Campaign ===
State Senator Nathan Johnson was the first Democratic candidate to enter the race and soon became the front runner in fundraising and number of endorsements. He was joined by Joe Jaworkski who had sought the Democratic nomination in 2022 and former FBI agent Tony Box. None of the candidates reached 50% in the primary resulting in a runoff between Johnson and Jaworski. Jaworski ran as the progressive candidate and criticized Johnson for his voting history in the Senate in which he voted for several Republican priority bills. Johnson presented himself as a candidate who can win elections.

=== Candidates ===
==== Nominee ====
- Nathan Johnson, state senator from the 16th district (2019–2027)

==== Eliminated in runoff ====
- Joe Jaworski, former mayor of Galveston, grandson of former U.S. Department of Justice special counsel Leon Jaworski, and candidate for attorney general in 2022

==== Eliminated in primary ====
- Tony Box, attorney

==== Declined ====
- Joaquin Castro, U.S. representative from Texas's 20th congressional district (2013–present) (ran for re-election)
- Jasmine Crockett, U.S. representative from Texas’s 30th congressional district (2023–2027) (ran for U.S. Senate)
- Roland Gutierrez, state senator from the 19th district (2021–present) and candidate for U.S. Senate in 2024 (ran for re-election)
- Justin Nelson, partner at Susman Godfrey and nominee for attorney general in 2018

=== Endorsements ===
Joe Jaworski

U.S. representatives

- John Bryant, TX-5 (1983–1987) and State Representative from HD-114 (2023–present)
- Nick Lampson, former TX-9 (1997–2005) and former TX-22 (2007–2009)

State legislators

- Alma Allen, HD-131 (2005–present)
- Josey Garcia, HD-124 (2023–present)
- Ann Johnson, HD-134 (2021–present)
- Charlene Ward Johnson, HD-139 (2025–present)
- Ray Lopez, HD-125 (2019–present)
- Ron Reynolds, HD-27 (2011–present)
- Jon Rosenthal, HD-135 (2019–present) and Texas Railroad Commission nominee
- Gene Wu, HD-137 (2017–present) and minority leader of the Texas House of Representatives (2025–present)

Organizations

- Texas Young Democrats
Nathan Johnson

U.S. representatives

- Lloyd Doggett, TX-35 (1995–present)
- Veronica Escobar, TX-16 (2019–present)
- Julie Johnson, TX-32 (2025–present)
- Marc Veasey, TX-33 (2013–present)

State legislators

- Carol Alvarado, SD-6 (2018–present) and minority leader of the Texas Senate (2020–present)
- Cesar Blanco, SD-29 (2021–present)
- Wendy Davis, former SD-10 and 2014 gubernatorial nominee
- Sarah Eckhardt, SD-14 (2020–present) and Texas Comptroller of Public Accounts nominee
- Juan Hinojosa, SD-20 (2003–present)
- José Menéndez, SD-26 (2015–present)
- Borris Miles, SD-13 (2016–present)
- Royce West, SD-23 (1993–present)
- Salman Bhojani, HD-92 (2023–present)
- Rhetta Bowers, HD-113 (2019–present)
- John Bucy III, HD-136 (2019–present)
- Sheryl Cole, HD-46 (2019–present)
- Aicha Davis, HD-109 (2025–present)
- Linda Garcia, HD-107 (2025–present)
- Barbara Gervin-Hawkins, HD-120 (2017–present)
- Ana Hernandez, HD-143 (2005–present)
- Cassandra Hernandez, HD-115 (2025–present)
- Donna Howard, HD-48 (2006–present)
- Venton Jones, HD-100 (2023–present)
- Suleman Lalani, HD-76 (2023–present)
- Armando Martinez, HD-39 (2005–present)
- Christian Manuel, HD-22 (2023–present)
- Claudia Ordaz, HD-79 (2021–present)
- Mary Ann Perez, HD-144 (2013–2015;2017–present)
- Vincent Perez, HD-77 (2025–present)
- Ramon Romero Jr., HD-90 (2015–present)
- Toni Rose, HD-110 (2013–present)
- Rodney Ellis, Harris County Commissioner (2017–present) and former SD-13 (1990–2017)

Local officials

- John Creuzot, Dallas County District Attorney (2019–present)

Labor unions

- Texas AFL-CIO

Organizations

- Houston LGBTQ+ Political Caucus

Newspapers

- Dallas Morning News
- Fort Worth Star-Telegram
- Houston Chronicle
- The Austin Chronicle
Tony Box (eliminated in primary)

Organizations

- VoteVets

Newspapers

- Austin American-Statesman
- San Antonio Express-News

=== Fundraising ===
Campaign finance Reports as of December 31, 2025
Candidate	Raised	Spent	Cash on hand
Tony Box (D)	$137,602	$87,897	$27,548
Joe Jaworski (D)	$219,882	$166,693	$249,986
Nathan Johnson (D)	$652,819	$349,080	$757,681
Source: Texas Ethics Commission

=== Debates and forums ===
2026 Texas Attorney General Democratic primary debates
No.	Date	Host	Moderator	Link	Participants		
P Participant A Absent N Non-invitee I Invitee W Withdrawn							
P Participant A Absent N Non-invitee I Invitee W Withdrawn					Box	Jaworski	Johnson
1	January 22, 2026	Richardson Area Democrats	James Barragan	YouTube	A	P	P

=== First round ===
==== Polling ====
Poll source	Date(s) administered	Sample size	Margin of error	Tony Box	Joe Jaworski	Nathan Johnson	Other	Undecided
UT Tyler	February 13–22, 2026	– (LV)	–	25%	32%	35%	–	8%
UT Tyler	February 13–22, 2026	– (RV)	–	26%	31%	34%	–	9%
University of Texas/ Texas Politics Project	February 2–16, 2026	183 (LV)	± 7.2%	10%	52%	28%	11% (Note: "Someone else" with 11%)	–
University of Houston/YouGov	January 20–31, 2026	550 (LV)	± 4.2%	13%	22%	25%	–	40%
Slingshot Strategies (D) (Note: Poll sponsored by Texas Public Opinion Research)	January 14–21, 2026	1,290 (LV)	± 3.7%	2%	5%	10%	5% (Note: "Would not vote in that race" with 5%)	78%
Texas Southern University	December 9–11, 2025	1,600 (LV)	± 2.5%	3%	21%	19%	–	57%
Texas Southern University	August 6–12, 2025	1,500 (LV)	± 2.5%	–	20%	20%	–	60%

First round results by county: Johnson: 30–40%; 40–50%; 50–60%; 60–70%; >90%; Jaworski: 30–40%; 40–50%; 50–60%; Box: 30–40%; 40–50%; 50–60%; Tie: Tie

==== Results ====
Democratic primary
Party	Candidate	Votes	%
Democratic	Nathan Johnson	1,003,967	48.1
Democratic	Joe Jaworski	551,898	26.4
Democratic	Anthony "Tony" Box	531,177	25.5
Total votes		2,087,042	100.00

=== Runoff ===
==== Results ====
Runoff results by county: Johnson: 50–60%; 60–70%; 70–80%; 80–90%; >90%; Jaworski: 50–60%; 60–70%; 70–80%; 80–90%; Tie: 50%; No votes: No votes

Democratic primary runoff results
Party	Candidate	Votes	%
Democratic	Nathan Johnson	334,199	60.5
Democratic	Joe Jaworski	218,224	39.5
Total votes		552,423	100.0

== Third-party and independent candidates ==
=== Candidates ===
==== Declared ====
- Tom Oxford (Libertarian), civil rights attorney and nominee for Supreme Court Place 8 in 2022

==== Disqualified ====
- Omer Wagas Khwaja (Independent)

== General election ==
=== Predictions ===
Source	Ranking	As of
Sabato's Crystal Ball	Likely R	August 20, 2026

=== Fundraising ===
Campaign finance reports as of October 24, 2026
Candidate	Raised	Spent	Cash on hand
Mayes Middleton (R)	$6,047,883	$5,867,579	$1,601,459
Nathan Johnson (D)	$2,426,656	$2,414,880	$65,647
Source: Texas Ethics Commission

=== Polling ===
Poll source	Date(s) administered	Sample size	Margin of error	Mayes Middleton (R)	Nathan Johnson (D)	Other	Undecided
Texas Southern University	October 21–25, 2026	2,000 (LV)	± 2.2%	49%	45%	2% (Note: Tom Oxford (L) with 2%)	4%
Texas Public Opinion Research	October 15–18, 2026	969 (LV)	± 3.9%	50%	48%	2% (Note: Tom Oxford (L) with 2%)	–
University of Houston	October 10–14, 2026	2,000 (LV)	± 2.2%	47%	42%	3% (Note: Tom Oxford (L) with 3%)	8%
University of Texas/Texas Politics Project	September 25 – October 5, 2026	861 (LV)	± 3.3%	47%	48%	4% (Note: Tom Oxford (L) with 1%; "Someone else" with 3%)	—
Stratus Intelligence (R)	September 22–24, 2026	865 (LV)	± 3.5%	47%	42%	—	11%
Texas Public Opinion Research	September 19–22, 2026	1,007 (LV)	± 3.6%	46%	43%	3% (Note: "Would not vote" with 1%; Tom Oxford (L) with 2%)	9%
Texas Southern University	September 15–19, 2026	1,800 (LV)	± 2.3%	47%	42%	2% (Note: Tom Oxford (L) with 2%)	9%
ReconMR/Siena University	September 8–11, 2026	614 (LV)	± 4.3%	45%	44%	2%	8%
Texas Public Opinion Research	August 21–24, 2026	1,000 (LV)	± 3.3%	44% (Note: With voters who lean towards a given candidate)	41%	5% (Note: "Would not vote" with 3%; Tom Oxford (L) & Omer Khwaja (I) with 1%)	10%
University of Texas/Texas Politics Project	August 5–13, 2026	1,200 (RV)	± 2.83%	40%	35%	4% (Note: Tom Oxford (L) with 3%; Someone else with 1%)	21%
Texas A&M University/ReconMR/Siena University	July 27–30, 2026	619 (LV)	± 4.7%	46%	44%		10%
Texas Southern University	July 27–30, 2026	1,200 (LV)	± 2.8%	46%	41%	3% (Note: Tom Oxford (L) with 3%)	10%
Texas Public Opinion Research	July 15–17, 2026	1,048 (LV)	± 3.4%	39%	38%	5% (Note: Tom Oxford (L) with 3%; "Would not vote" with 2%)	18%
University of Texas/YouGov	June 5–12, 2026	1,200 (RV)	± 3.47%	41%	36%	6% (Note: "Someone else" with 4%; Tom Oxford (L) with 2%)	18%
Texas A&M University/ReconMR	June 1–4, 2026	807 (LV)	± 4%	45%	40%	4% (Note: "Someone else" with 2%; "Wouldn't vote" with 2%)	11%
Texas Public Opinion Research	May 27–28, 2026	1,670 (LV)	± 2.8%	44%	39%	4% (Note: "Would not vote in that race" with 2% Tom Oxford (L) with 2%)	13%

Hypothetical polling

Poll source	Date(s) administered	Sample size	Margin of error	Mayes Middleton or Chip Roy (R)	Joe Jaworski or Nathan Johnson (D)	Other	Undecided
Slingshot Strategies (D)	April 17–20, 2026	1,018 (LV)	± 3.3%	45%	39%	2% (Note: "Would not vote in that race" with 2%)	15%

Generic Republican vs. generic Democrat

Poll source	Date(s) administered	Sample size	Margin of error	Generic Republican	Generic Democrat	Other	Undecided
Texas Public Opinion Research	August 27–29, 2025	843 (RV)	± 4.6%	47%	44%	9% (Note: "Someone else" with 9%)	–

=== Post-primary endorsements ===
Nathan Johnson (D)

State judicial officials

- Deborah Hankinson, former justice of the Supreme Court of Texas (1997–2002) (Republican)
- Thomas R. Phillips, former chief justice of the Supreme Court of Texas (1988–2004) (Republican)

Local officials

- Mattie Parker, Mayor of Fort Worth, Texas (2021–present) (Republican)

Newspapers

- Austin American-Statesman
- The Dallas Morning News
Mayes Middleton (R)

Individuals

- David Barton, author and former vice chair of the Republican Party of Texas

=== Results ===
2026 Texas Attorney General election
Party	Candidate	Votes	%	±%
Democratic	Nathan Johnson	5,135,525	52.4	
Republican	Mayes Middleton	4,503,855	45.9	
Libertarian	Tom Oxford	165,620	1.7	
Total votes		9,805,000	100.0%	
Democratic gain from Republican				

== Notes ==
Partisan clients

== See also ==
- 2026 United States attorney general elections
