= Harris County District Attorney =

Local elected office

The Harris County District Attorney is the elected prosecutor of Harris County, Texas. The office receives cases from 86 law enforcement agencies. Currently, the position is held by Sean Teare.

== Intake division ==
Unlike other counties in Texas, police in Harris County must receive approval from prosecutors before filing criminal charges against a person and arresting them. This gives the intake division in the Harris County DA's office an unusual amount of power in determining who goes to jail. Under the administration of Kim Ogg, the DA's office has been criticized for poorly vetting cases and contributing the dangerous overcrowding in the Harris County jail by causing unnecessary arrests. The intake division receives hundreds of calls daily from police officers seeking arrest. A 2024 Houston Chronicle investigation found that cases thrown out by judges for a lack of probable cause had doubled between 2016 and 2022, causing more people to be sent to the jail with no legal justification.

== Death penalty ==
More executions have taken place in Harris County than in every individual state aside from Texas, and more than Alabama and Georgia combined. As of 2017, the county had executed 126 people since the 1976 legalization of capital punishment, leading it to be referred to as the "death penalty capital of the world." Elected in 1979, DA Johnny Holmes sent over 200 people to death row. Nearing the end of his career, DA Holmes won an average of 12 capital sentences each year. After DA Holmes retired in 2000, the number of death penalty cases fell sharply which was also in alignment with national trends and shifts in public opinion. DA Rosenthal, who was elected after Holmes left office, won death penalty cases about half as often. 2017 was the first year since 1985 that the county had not executed anyone on death row.

== Southlawn gang injunction ==
In September of 2015 Harris County DA Devon Anderson and Harris County Attorney Vince Ryan filed a petition to ban 92 Black men from the "Southlawn Safety Zone," a two-mile area in south Houston. The area has struggled with safety challenges for many years, and police blame gangs for much of the violent activity. Some community members protested the proposed injunction, claiming that unjustly, broadly, and unconstitutionally targeted Black men who are young adults regardless of their involvement in gang violence. At the time of the petition, the area population was 78% Black and 20% Hispanic. After initially reducing the number of defendants in the petition and receiving backlash, the case was eventually dismissed in June of 2016. Leading up to the dismissal there were meetings between defendants' attorneys, county officials, and advocates who agreed to implement educational and workforce development programs that would address the causes of violence and instability in the neighborhood.

== Disclosure database ==
The DA's office maintains a list, referred to as the disclosure database, of police officers that they have decided are unreliable witnesses for court testimony. These are officers who have given reason to doubt their ability to provide reliable testimony due to falsifying evidence, lying, making racist comments, or other reasons. A coalition of groups requested in 2019 that the DA's office make the list of untrustworthy officers public as was done in Philadelphia and other cities, but the request was refused. The office also refused to provide the number of officers on the list.

== List of Harris County district attorneys ==
- Sean Teare, 2025–present
- Kim Ogg, 2017–2024
- Devon Anderson, 2013–2016
- Mike Anderson, 2013
- Pat Lykos, 2009–2012
- Kenneth Magidson, 2008
- Chuck Rosenthal, 2001–2008
- Johnny Holmes, 1979–2000
