= Craig Eiland =

American lawyer and politician (born 1962)

Allen Craig Eiland
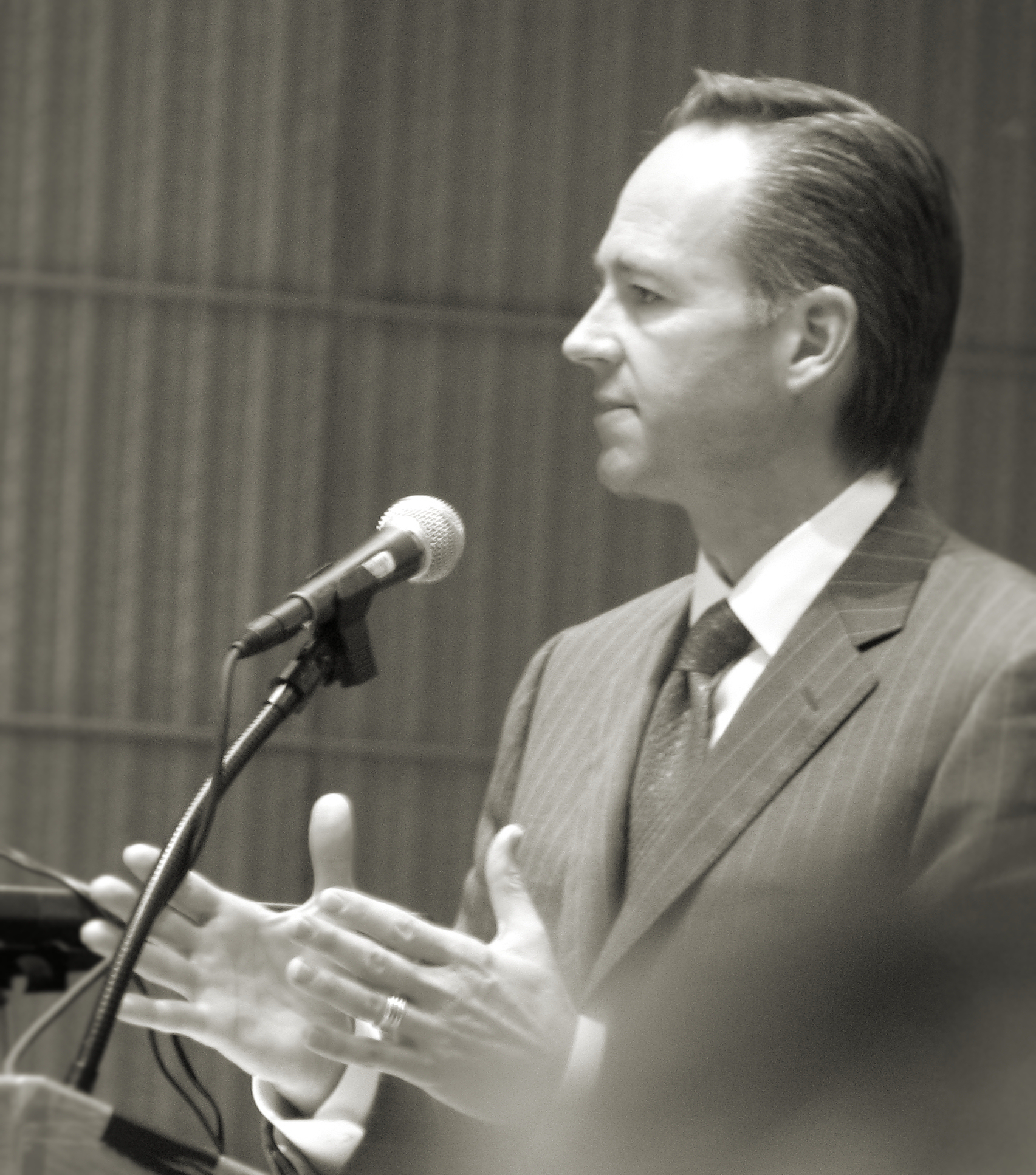
- Eiland in 2009

Member of the Texas House of Representatives from the 23rd district
- In office 2003–2015
- Preceded by: Patricia Gray
- Succeeded by: Wayne Faircloth

Member of the Texas House of Representatives from the 24th district
- In office 1994–2003
- Preceded by: Mike Martin
- Succeeded by: Larry Taylor

Personal details
- Born: April 4, 1962 (age 64) Stanton, Martin County; Texas, USA
- Party: Democratic
- Spouse: Melissa Orebaugh Eiland
- Children: 4
- Education: Baylor University (B.B.A.), (J.D.)
- Profession: Attorney
- Website: Official website

Allen Craig Eiland (born April 4, 1962) is a Democratic former member and Speaker pro Tempore of the Texas House of Representatives. From 2003 until 2015, Eiland represented Texas House District 23, which includes Galveston, Jamaica Beach, Texas City, and the Bolivar Peninsula in Galveston County and all of Chambers County.

Prior to redistricting in 2003, Eiland was the member for House District 24, which roughly covered all of Galveston County west of Interstate 45.

Eiland was first elected to the House in 1994. For eight years he served on the Insurance and Appropriations committees, including four years as Vice Chair of the Insurance Committee and two years as chair of the House Pensions and Investments Committee.

In 2009, Speaker Joe Straus named Eiland the House Speaker Pro-tempore, a job which entails leading the house in Speaker Straus' absence. Eiland was also named to the powerful House Appropriations committee and the Insurance committee. In 2011 Beverly Woolley of Houston was chosen to replace Eiland after Republicans captured a super majority of seats (101 out of 150) in the 2010 elections.

He is viewed by his colleagues as an expert on insurance matters and the state budget in general and the Medicaid and CHIP program budgets specifically. Texas Monthly magazine has also named Eiland one of Texas' 10 Best Lawmakers.

In the November 4, 2014, general election, Eiland did not seek reelection.

Eiland served on the House Appropriations Committee and was the vice chairman of the Insurance Committee.

A native of Stanton in Martin County, Eiland resides on Galveston Island. He and his wife, the former Melissa Orebaugh, have four children (William Gray Eiland, Delaney Eiland, Blake Eiland, and Robert Tucker Eiland). They are members of Moody Memorial First United Methodist Church in Galveston.

Texas House of Representatives
Preceded by Patricia Gray	Member of the Texas House of Representatives from District 23 (Galveston); 2003–2015	Succeeded by Wayne Faircloth
Preceded by Mike Martin	Member of the Texas House of Representatives from District 24 (Galveston); 1994–2002	Succeeded by Larry Taylor
