= United States Attorney for the Southern District of Texas =

Chief federal law enforcement officer in forty-three Texas counties

U.S. Attorney's Office for the Southern District of Texas
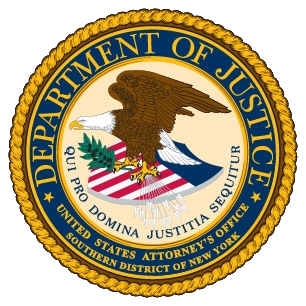

Department overview
- Formed: July 1, 1902
- Jurisdiction: Southern District of Texas
- Headquarters: Houston, Texas, U.S.
- Department executives: Aaron Reitz, U.S. Attorney; Emil Kiehne, First Assistant U.S. Attorney
- Parent Department: United States Department of Justice
- Website: justice.gov/usao-sdtx/

Map
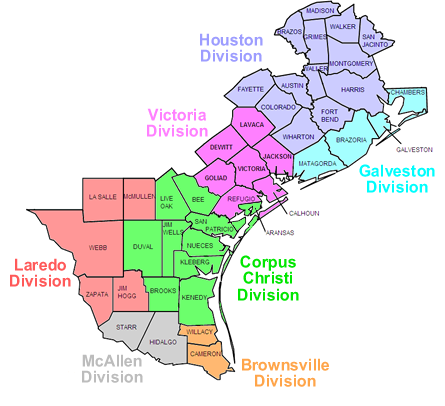
- Southern District of Texas

The United States Attorney for the Southern District of Texas is the chief federal law enforcement officer in forty-three Texas counties. Established on July 1, 1902, the office represents the United States government in criminal and civil cases across the country. The SDTX handles a broad array of cases, including but not limited to those involving white collar crime, domestic terrorism, cybercrime, public corruption, organized crime, as well as civil rights disputes.

In 1906, President Roosevelt named Lodowick “Lock” McDaniel of Grimes County, Texas, to be the first man appointed as the United States Attorney for the SDTX. Originally, the SDTX covered 36 counties. The court and the U.S. Attorney rotated between Galveston, Laredo, Brownsville and Houston which was a new seat for the court. Over the years, divisions were added, counties were transferred and divided and more judges and U.S. Attorney’s offices were opened.

As of July -0, 2026, the United States attorney is Aaron Reitz.

== Organization ==
The office typically prosecutes more cases against more defendants than every other United States Attorney's Office nationwide, representing forty-three counties, ten million people and covering 44,000 square miles. The Southern District of Texas currently comprises seven divisions with federal district courts in Houston, Galveston, Victoria, Corpus Christi, Brownsville, McAllen and Laredo. The SDTX, headquartered in Houston, has branch offices in Galveston, Corpus Christi, Brownsville, McAllen, Laredo and Victoria to staff all seven divisions. The office employs approximately 200 assistant U.S. attorneys.

The jurisdiction of the Southern District of Texas is divided as follows:

- The Brownsville Division covers Cameron and Willacy Counties.
- The Corpus Christi Division covers Aransas, Bee, Brooks, Duval, Jim Wells, Kenedy, Kleberg, Live Oak, Nueces, and San Patricio Counties.
- The Galveston Division covers Brazoria, Chambers, Galveston, and Matagorda Counties.
- The Houston Division covers Austin, Brazos, Colorado, Fayette, Fort Bend, Grimes, Harris, Madison, Montgomery, San Jacinto, Walker, Waller, and Wharton Counties.
- The Laredo Division covers Jim Hogg, La Salle, McMullen, Webb, and Zapata Counties.
- The McAllen Division covers Hidalgo and Starr Counties.
- The Victoria Division covers Calhoun, DeWitt, Goliad, Jackson, Lavaca, Refugio, and Victoria Counties.

== List of U.S. attorneys ==
In 1857, congress created the Eastern and Western District of Texas. Texas continued to grow, and in 1879, congress formed the Northern District. As the railroads continued to expand and fuel the Texas economy, congress created the Southern District on July 1, 1902.

1. Marcus C. McLemore (1902–1906)
2. Lodowick McDaniel (1906–1914)
3. John Edward Green Jr. (1914–1919)
4. David Edward Simmons (1919–1922)
5. Henry Matthews Holden (1922–1934)
6. Douglas Wear McGregor (1934–1944)
7. Brian Sylvester Odem (1944–1954)
8. Malcolm Richard Wilkey (1954–1957)
9. William B. Butler (1957–1961)
10. Woodrow Bradley Seals (1961–1966)
11. Morton Lee Susman (1966–1969)
12. Anthony Perez Farris (1969–1974)
13. Edward B. McDonough Jr. (1974–1977)
14. Jose Antonio Canales (1977–1980)
15. Daniel Kuldell Hedges (1981–1985)
16. Henry K. Oncken (1985–1990)
17. Ronald G. Woods (1990–1993)
18. Gaynelle Griffin Jones (1993–1997)
19. Mervyn Milton Mosbacker (1999–2001)
20. Michael T. Shelby (2001–2005)
21. Donald J. DeGabrielle (2006–2008)
22. Kenneth Magidson (2011–2017)
23. Ryan Patrick (2018–2021)
24. Alamdar S. Hamdani (2022–2025)
25. Nicholas Ganjei (2025-2026)
26. Aaron Reitz (2026–Present)

== See also ==
- United States District Court for the Southern District of Texas
- Courts of Texas
- List of current United States district judges
- List of United States federal courthouses in Texas
