= John Marck =

American judge (born 1982)

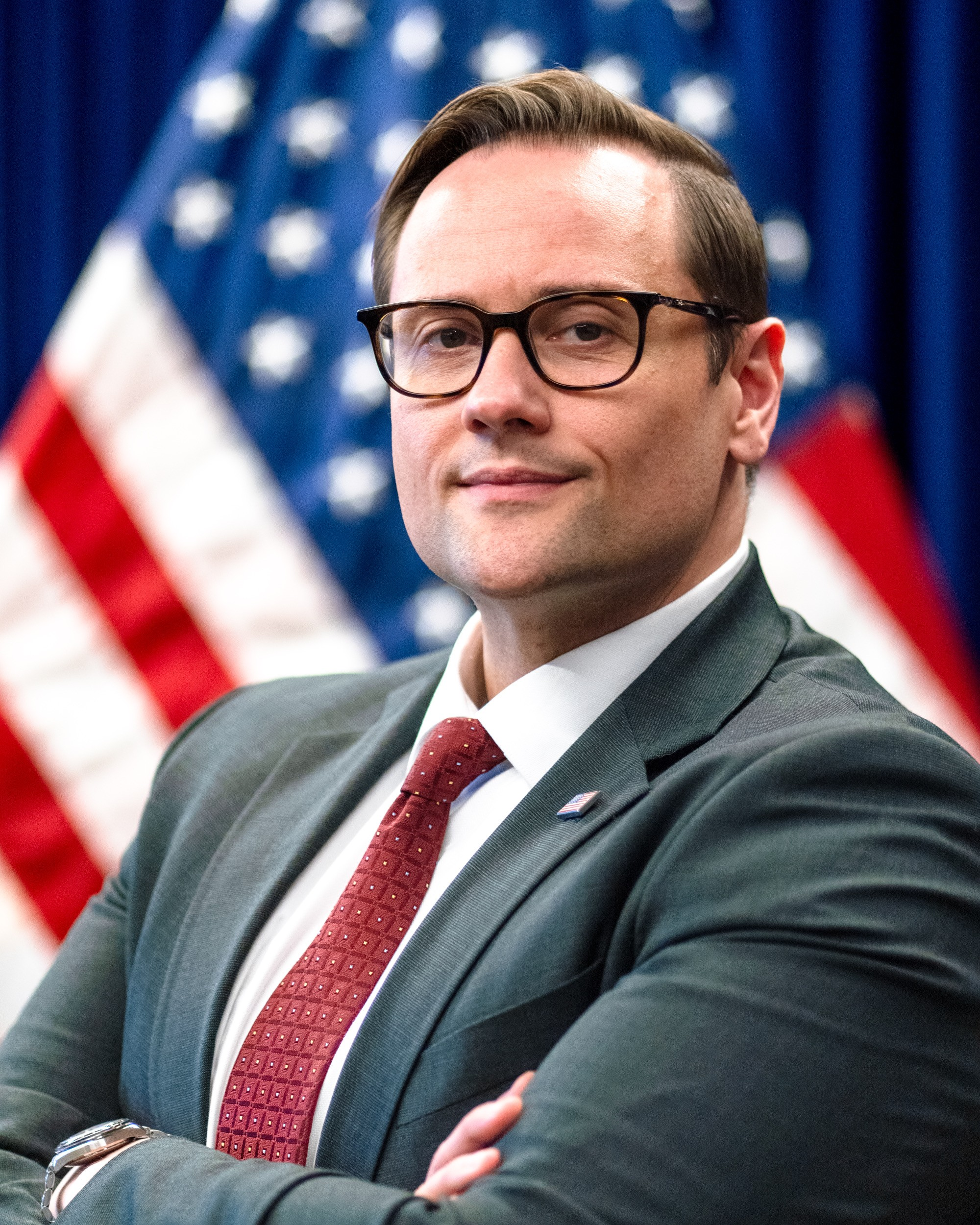

Judge of the United States District Court for the Southern District of Texas
- Incumbent
- Assumed office July 9, 2026
- Appointed by: Donald Trump
- Preceded by: Micaela Alvarez

Acting United States Attorney for the Southern District of Texas
- In office March 10, 2026 – July 9, 2026
- President: Donald Trump
- Preceded by: Nicholas Ganjei
- Succeeded by: Aaron Reitz

Personal details
- Born: John George Edward Marck; 1982 (age 43–44) West Islip, New York, U.S.
- Education: Brooklyn College (BA); St. John's University (JD)

John George Edward Marck (born 1982) is an American lawyer who serves as a United States district judge of the United States District Court for the Southern District of Texas. He previously served as the acting United States attorney for the Southern District of Texas prior to becoming a judge.

== Early life and education ==
Marck was born in 1982, in West Islip, New York.

Marck attended college at several institutions including Farmingdale State College from 2002 to 2003, Hofstra University in 2003, Suffolk County Community College from 2004 to 2005 and again from 2007 to 2008 and Tulane University in 2007 before receiving his Bachelor of Arts degree in 2009 from Brooklyn College. He earned his Juris Doctor in 2013 from St. John's University School of Law.

== Career ==
He worked as a security guard with ABM Security Services from 2009 to 2013, while attending law school. He began his career as an assistant district attorney for the Bronx County District Attorney and the Brooklyn District Attorney in New York City. From 2021 to 2026, he served as an assistant United States attorney in the Southern District of Texas, including as associate deputy criminal chief in 2025 and as first assistant United States attorney from 2025 to 2026, before becoming Acting United States attorney in 2026. In 2026, he served as the Acting United States Attorney for the Southern District of Texas.

=== Federal judicial service ===
On April 1, 2026, President Donald Trump announced his intention to nominate Marck to an undesignated seat on the United States District Court for the Southern District of Texas. On April 14, 2026, Trump nominated Marck to the seat vacated by Judge Micaela Alvarez. On April 29, 2026 he had his confirmation hearing with the Senate Judiciary Committee. On June 18, 2026 the Judiciary Committee advanced his nomination on a 12–10 party-line vote. On June 24, 2026 the Senate invoked cloture on his nomination by a 52–45 vote and on the same day he was confirmed by the same 52–45 margin. He received his judicial commission on July 9, 2026.

Legal offices
Preceded by Nicholas Ganjei	Acting United States Attorney for the Southern District of Texas; 2026	Succeeded by Aaron Reitz
Preceded by Micaela Alvarez	Judge of the United States District Court for the Southern District of Texas; 2026–present	Incumbent
