= Nathan Johnson (politician) =

American politician and composer (born 1968)

Nathan M. Johnson
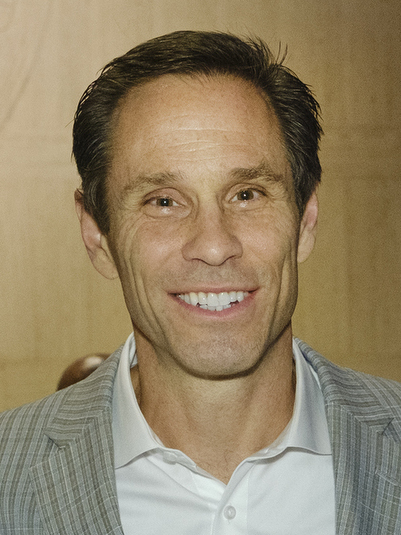
- Johnson in 2023

Attorney General-elect of Texas
- Assuming office January 2027
- Governor: Gina Hinojosa (elect)
- Succeeding: Ken Paxton

Member of the Texas Senate from the 16th district
- Incumbent
- Assumed office January 8, 2019
- Preceded by: Don Huffines

Personal details
- Born: Nathan Matthew Johnson; February 12, 1968 (age 58) Fort Worth, Texas, U.S.
- Party: Democratic
- Education: University of Arizona (BS); University of Texas at Austin (JD)
- Website: State Senate website; Campaign website

Nathan Matthew Johnson (born February 12, 1968) is an American politician, lawyer, and composer who is the attorney general-elect of Texas. A member of the Democratic Party, he has represented the 16th district in the Texas Senate since 2019.

In the November 6, 2018, election, Johnson defeated incumbent Republican Don Huffines to become the first Democrat to represent the district in over three decades. Johnson won the 2026 Texas Attorney General election, defeating Republican Mayes Middleton and becoming the first Democrat elected Texas Attorney General since 1994.

== Early life and education ==
Johnson is a native of Fort Worth, Texas. He received a B.S. in physics from the University of Arizona in 1990 and a J.D. degree from the University of Texas School of Law in 1993. In college, he volunteered for victims of domestic violence.

== Legal and music career ==
Johnson practices business law and bankruptcy law. He co-founded a law firm specializing with business disputes, while working pro-bono for Human Rights Initiative of North Texas. In 2019, Johnson joined Thompson & Knight LLP (which later merged under Holland & Knight) as counsel for the Dallas trial practice group. In July 2023, Johnson joined Thompson Coburn, where he practices commercial litigation in Dallas.

Johnson owned a music production company, where he composed music for the Funimation Entertainment-produced uncut English dub of the Dragon Ball Z anime. Johnson composed music for 67 episodes in addition to the movies The World's Strongest, The Tree of Might, Broly – Second Coming, Fusion Reborn, and Wrath of the Dragon.

== Texas Senate ==
Johnson speaking at the Massachusetts State House on August 5, 2025, during the 2025 Texas walkout, accompanied by other Texas legislators, Massachusetts Gov. Maura Healey, and Massachusetts Secretary of the Commonwealth William F. Galvin.

In 2018, Johnson ran for Texas State Senate in District 16. The district had been shifting to align with the Democrats and in an upset Johnson defeated incumbent Republican Don Huffines by eight percent.

During the impeachment trial of Attorney General Ken Paxton, Paxton's attorneys made a motion to disqualify Johnson and two other senators from serving as jurors in the case, claiming they had shown bias and could not be impartial. Lieutenant Governor Dan Patrick dismissed this motion. In 2024, Johnson faced a primary challenge from State Representative Victoria Neave Criado who accused him of being too moderate and not in step with the Democratic Party, specifically when it came to immigration policy. Johnson won the primary with just under 60% of the votes.

=== Political positions ===
Johnson has frequently pushed for legislation related to expanding access to medical care in the state. This includes authoring legislation to expand the definition of palliative care, decriminalize the use of fentanyl testing strips, and expand Medicaid. The Texas Tribune notes that Johnson's centrist voting record is nearly indistinguishable from most of the other Democrats in the Texas Senate, according to political scientists, and he has generally avoided partisan attacks from the left.

=== Committee assignments ===
- Administration (2019–2023) (Vice-Chair, 2021)
- Business & Commerce (2021–2025)
- Economic Development (2025)
- Health and Human Affairs (2019)
- Jurisprudence (2021–2025) (Vice-Chair, 2023–2025)
- Water, Agriculture, & Rural Affairs (2019–2025)
- Transportation (2025)
- Texas Energy Fund Advisory (2023)
- Redistricting, Special (2021)
- Veteran Affairs and Border Security (2019)

== 2026 Attorney General election ==
On July 15, 2025, Johnson announced his bid for the 2026 Texas Attorney General election, seeking to replace three-term Ken Paxton who was running for United States Senate. His opponents in the primary were Dallas attorney Tony Box and Joe Jaworski, former Mayor of Galveston and candidate for Attorney General in 2022. In the March 2026 primary Johnson received the most votes with 48.1% followed by Jaworski with 26.4% and Box with 25.5%. Since no candidate received a majority of the vote, Johnson and Jaworski advanced to a runoff election held on May 26, 2026. Johnson won the runoff with 60.5% of the vote. He defeated fellow state senator and Republican nominee Mayes Middleton in the general election, becoming the first Democratic Texas Attorney General since 1994.

== Electoral history ==
=== 2018 ===
2018 Texas elections: Senate District 16
Party	Candidate	Votes	%
Democratic	Nathan Johnson	159,228	54.13%
Republican	Don Huffines (incumbent)	134,933	45.87%
Democratic gain from Republican			

Democratic Primary: Senate District 16
Party	Candidate	Votes	%
Democratic	Nathan Johnson	25,437	69.57%
Democratic	Joe Bogen	11,125	30.43%

=== 2022 ===
2022 Texas elections: Senate District 16
Party	Candidate	Votes	%
Democratic	Nathan Johnson (incumbent)	118,663	61.95%
Republican	Brandon Copeland	72,885	38.05%
Democratic hold			

Democratic Primary: Senate District 16
Party	Candidate	Votes	%
Democratic	Nathan Johnson	31,323	100%

=== 2024 ===
2024 Texas Senate District 16 Democratic primary
Party	Candidate	Votes	%
Democratic	Nathan M. Johnson (incumbent)	19,629	59.15%
Democratic	Victoria Neave	13,554	40.85%
Total votes		33,183	100.00%

=== 2026 ===
2026 Texas Attorney General Democratic primary
Party	Candidate	Votes	%
Democratic	Nathan Johnson	1,003,967	48.1
Democratic	Joe Jaworski	551,898	26.4
Democratic	Anthony "Tony" Box	531,177	25.5
Total votes		2,087,042	100.00

2026 Texas Attorney General Democratic primary runoff results
Party	Candidate	Votes	%
Democratic	Nathan Johnson	332,257	60.5
Democratic	Joe Jaworski	216,849	39.5
Total votes		549,106	100.0

Party political offices
Preceded by Rochelle Mercedes Garza	Democratic nominee for Attorney General of Texas; 2026	Most recent
