= Victoria Neave =

American attorney and politician

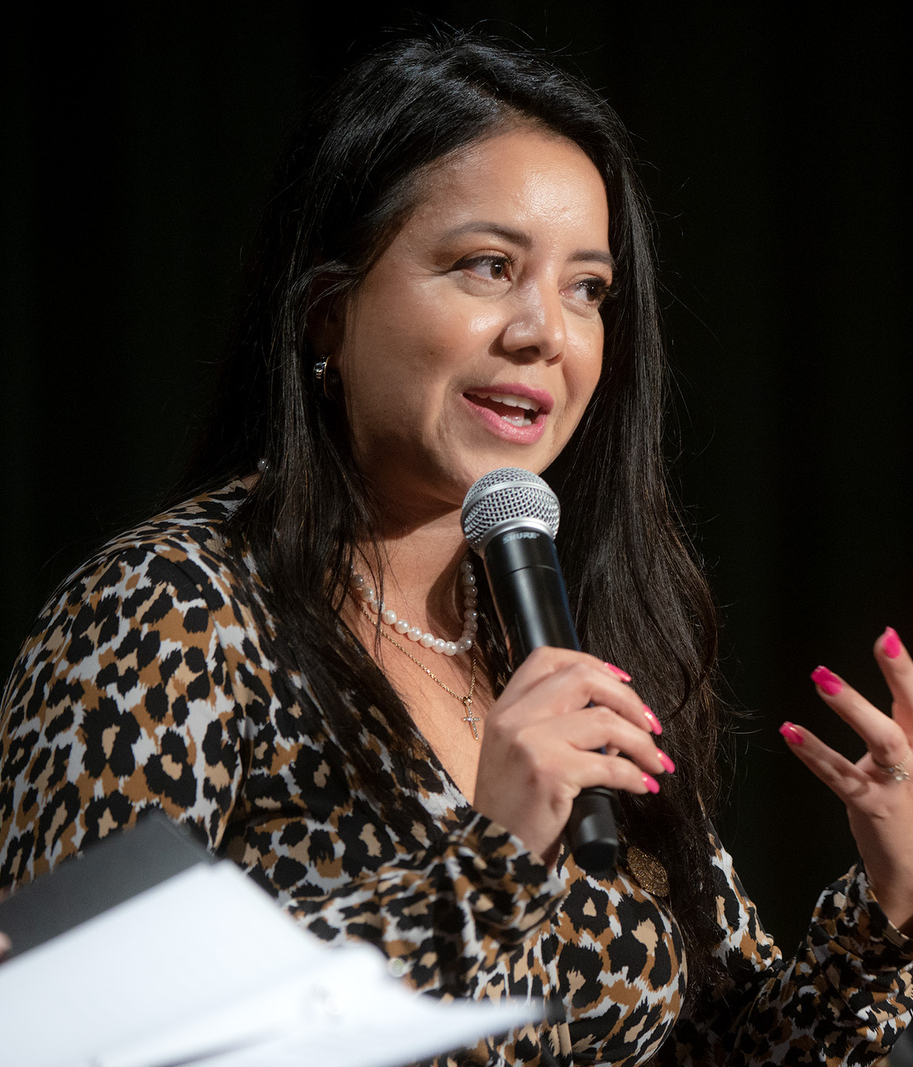

Member of the Texas House of Representatives from the 107th district
- In office January 10, 2017 – January 14, 2025
- Preceded by: Kenneth Sheets
- Succeeded by: Linda Garcia

Personal details
- Born: December 29, 1980 (age 45) Dallas, Texas, U.S.
- Party: Democratic
- Education: Tulane University; Dallas College; University of Texas, Dallas (BA); Texas Southern University (JD)

Victoria Neave Criado (born December 29, 1980) is an American attorney and politician who served as a Democratic member of the Texas House of Representatives for District 107 in Dallas County. She unseated Republican incumbent Kenneth Sheets in the most expensive Texas House race of the 2016 cycle.

== Texas House of Representatives ==
Neave was named the House Democratic Caucus Freshman of the Year. During her first session, she passed a law to allow "Texans applying for or renewing their driver’s license the option to donate $1 or more toward rape kit testing." As of June 2018, the program had "collected more than $234,956."

Neave was arrested in June 2017 on a Driving While Intoxicated charge after she crashed her BMW into a tree and repeatedly told arresting officers that "I love you and I want to fight for you, and I invoke the Fifth Amendment." Neave said after her arrest that she was "deeply sorry, and will accept the consequences of my actions, and will work to make this right." As a local attorney and legislator, concerns were expressed at favoritism by police, prosecutors and local media towards Neave.

Neave was reelected to her second term in the general election held on November 6, 2018, when she defeated the Republican candidate, Deanna Maria Metzger, 28,923 (57.1 percent) to 21,770 (42.9 percent).

In 2019, Neave passed omnibus legislation to tackle the backlog of thousands of untested rape kits in Texas called the Lavinia Masters Act, or House Bill 8, which also included $50 million from the Texas budget. As of 2021, there was an 80% reduction in the rape kit backlog. Neave has also "[led] the charge at the Texas Capitol to fight these arrangements [nondisclosure agreements] through a bill that would void contractual agreements that prevent employees from notifying law enforcement or regulatory agencies about sexual harassment or sexual assault in the workplace."

Neave was selected as one of seventeen speakers to jointly deliver the keynote address at the 2020 Democratic National Convention. In 2021, Neave while only in her "third term, was appointed to a coveted committee chair position in the Texas House" and is only the sixth Latina in Texas History to chair a committee in the Texas House of Representatives. She was appointed as Chair of the Texas House Committee on Juvenile Justice and Family Issues. In 2023, Victoria Neave Criado was appointed as Chair of the Texas House Committee on County Affairs.

In 2024, Neave launched a primary challenge against State Senator Nathan Johnson whom she accused of being too moderate and not in step with the Democratic Party, specifically when it came to immigration policy. Johnson won the primary with just under 60% of the votes.

Party political offices
Preceded by Elizabeth Warren	Keynote Speaker of the Democratic National Convention; 2020; Served alongside: Stacey Abrams, Raumesh Akbari, Colin Allred, Brendan Boyle, Yvanna Cancela, Kathleen Clyde, Nikki Fried, Robert Garcia, Malcolm Kenyatta, Marlon Kimpson, Conor Lamb, Mari Manoogian, Jonathan Nez, Sam Park, Denny Ruprecht, Randall Woodfin	Succeeded by Angela Alsobrooks
