= Ryan Patrick =

American attorney and judge (born 1979)

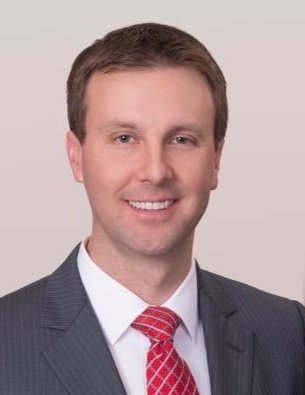
- Official portrait, 2018

United States Attorney for the Southern District of Texas
- In office January 8, 2018 – February 28, 2021
- President: Donald Trump; Joe Biden
- Preceded by: Kenneth Magidson
- Succeeded by: Alamdar S. Hamdani

Judge of the 177th District Court
- In office September 8, 2012 – December 31, 2016
- Appointed by: Rick Perry
- Preceded by: Kevin Fine
- Succeeded by: Robert Johnson

Personal details
- Born: Ryan Kelley Goeb Patrick; 1979 (age 46–47) Washington, D.C., U.S.
- Party: Republican
- Spouse: Kellie
- Children: 4
- Parent: Dan Patrick (father)
- Education: Baylor University (BA); South Texas College of Law (JD)

Ryan Kelley Goeb Patrick (born 1979) is an American attorney and former Texas district court judge who served as the United States Attorney for the Southern District of Texas from 2018 to 2021. He was confirmed by the U.S. Senate in December 2017 and assumed office early the following year.

== Early life and education ==
Patrick was born in Washington, D.C., while his father, Dan Patrick, was working as a television sportscaster at WTTG. He graduated from Baylor University in 2001 and earned a Juris Doctor degree from South Texas College of Law Houston in 2006.

== Career ==
Patrick served as a political director for the Harris County Republican Party from 2002 to 2004 and as an assistant district attorney for Harris County from 2006 to 2012. In 2012, Texas Governor Rick Perry appointed Patrick to be a judge at the 177th state district court, and Patrick was elected to the position in 2012, though he narrowly lost the seat in 2016 in a local election sweep by Democrats after winning a four-year term in November 2012. Patrick subsequently returned to private practice.

Patrick swore-in his father as the 42nd lieutenant governor of Texas at his inauguration ceremonies in 2015 and 2023.

In July 2017, the Trump administration selected Patrick to serve as the U.S. Attorney for the Southern District of Texas, and U.S. President Donald Trump made his nomination official on November 1, 2017. The United States Senate confirmed Patrick by voice vote on December 20, 2017. He assumed office on January 8, 2018, and his investiture ceremony occurred on September 18, 2018.

On February 8, 2021, he along with 55 other Trump-era attorneys were asked to resign. On February 22, he submitted his resignation, effective February 28.

On March 22, 2021, Patrick joined the Houston office of international law firm Haynes and Boone, LLP as a partner in their white collar criminal defense and government investigations practice.

== Personal life ==
Patrick and his wife have four children and live in Houston, Texas.
