= Wayne Faircloth =

American politician (born 1953)

Member of the Texas House of Representatives from the 23rd district
- In office January 13, 2015 – January 8, 2019
- Preceded by: Craig Eiland
- Succeeded by: Mayes Middleton

Personal details
- Born: March 10, 1953 (age 73)
- Party: Republican
- Education: Sam Houston State University
- Profession: Insurance agent Former educator

Fennis Wayne Faircloth, known as Wayne Faircloth (born March 10, 1953), is an insurance agent from Dickinson, Texas who served as a Republican member of the Texas House of Representatives from 2015 to 2019.

== Political career ==
Texas House of Representatives
Preceded by Craig Eiland	Member of the Texas House of Representatives from District 23 (Galveston); 2015–2019	Succeeded by Mayes Middleton
