= Texas Conservative Coalition Research Institute =

American think tank

- Founder: Texas Conservative Coalition (legislative caucus)
- Established: 1996
- Focus: Conservative public policies in state government
- Chair: Larry Taylor
- Budget: Revenue: $955,909; Expenses: $1,192,239 (FYE December 2015)
- Website: Official website

The Texas Conservative Coalition Research Institute (TCCRI) is a conservative think tank in Texas. It was founded in 1996 by state legislators who had a vision to develop and implement conservative public policies in state government. The group states that it "is committed to shaping public policy through a principled approach to state government."

Texas State Senator Larry Taylor was selected as the group's chairman in February 2015. Jeff Sandefer sits on the organization's board.

The group has fought energy regulations in Texas and opposed stricter campaign finance disclosure limits.
