= 1994 Texas Attorney General election =

- November 8, 1994
Nominee	Dan Morales	Don Wittig
Party	Democratic	Republican
Popular vote	2,289,389	1,850,403
Percentage	53.70%	43.40%
- County results Morales: 40–50% 50–60% 60–70% 70–80% 80–90% Wittig: 40–50% 50–60% 60–70%
Attorney General before election
Dan Morales
Democratic
Elected Attorney General
Dan Morales
Democratic

The 1994 Texas Attorney General election took place on November 8, 1994, to elect the Texas Attorney General. Incumbent Democratic Attorney General Dan Morales won re-election to a second term, defeating Republican nominee Don Wittig, 53.7% to 43.4%.

This was the last time a Democrat won an election to the office of Texas Attorney General until 2026.

== Republican primary ==
=== Candidates ===
==== Nominee ====
- Don Wittig, Houston judge.

==== Eliminated in primary ====
- Pat Lykos, Houston judge.
- John Marshall, Dallas judge.
- Tony Garza, Cameron County judge.

March 8, 1994 Republican primary
Party	Candidate	Votes	%
Republican	Pat Lykos	145,922	29.30%
Republican	Don Wittig	141,488	28.41%
Republican	John Marshall	123,618	24.82%
Republican	Tony Garza	87,042	17.48%
Total votes		498,070	100.00%

April 12, 1994 Republican primary runoff
Party	Candidate	Votes	%
Republican	Don Wittig	110,394	54.80%
Republican	Pat Lykos	91,045	45.20%
Total votes		201,439	100.00%

== Democratic primary ==
=== Candidates ===
==== Nominee ====
- Dan Morales, incumbent Texas Attorney General.

=== Results ===
Democratic primary
Party	Candidate	Votes	%
Democratic	Dan Morales (incumbent)	810,965	100.00%
Total votes		810,965	100.00%

== General election ==
=== Results ===
1994 Texas Attorney General election
Party	Candidate	Votes	%
Democratic	Dan Morales (incumbent)	2,289,389	53.70%
Republican	Don Wittig	1,850,403	43.40%
Libertarian	Vicki Flores	123,369	2.89%
Total votes		4,263,161	100.00%
Democratic hold			
