= Micaela Alvarez =

American judge (born 1958)

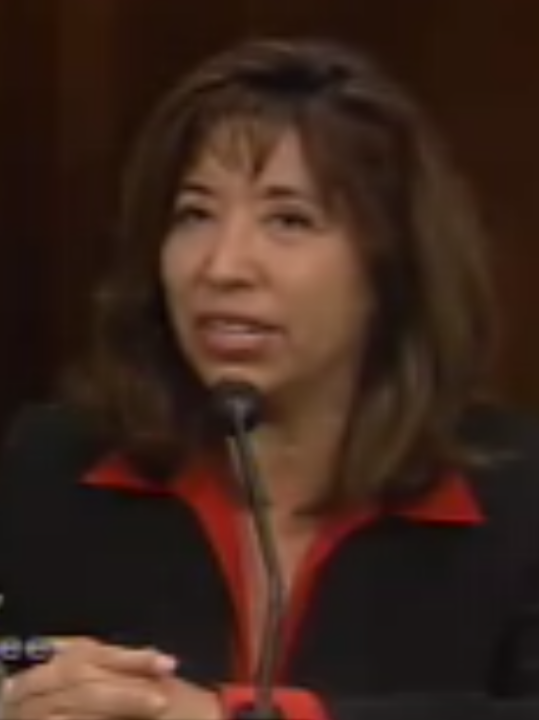

Senior Judge of the United States District Court for the Southern District of Texas
- Incumbent
- Assumed office June 8, 2023

Judge of the United States District Court for the Southern District of Texas
- In office December 13, 2004 – June 8, 2023
- Appointed by: George W. Bush
- Preceded by: David Hittner
- Succeeded by: John Marck

Personal details
- Born: June 8, 1958 (age 68) Donna, Texas, U.S.
- Education: University of Texas (BS); University of Texas School of Law (JD)

Micaela Alvarez (born June 8, 1958) is a senior United States district judge of the United States District Court for the Southern District of Texas.

== Education and career ==
Alvarez was born in Donna, Texas. She received her Bachelor of Science degree from the University of Texas in 1980 and her Juris Doctor from the University of Texas School of Law in 1989. She was in private practice in McAllen, Texas, from 1989 to 1995, and from 1997 to 2004. She was a presiding judge of the 139th Judicial District Court from 1995 to 1996.

=== Federal judicial service ===
On June 16, 2004, Alvarez was nominated by President George W. Bush to a seat on the United States District Court for the Southern District of Texas vacated by David Hittner. She was confirmed by the United States Senate on November 20, 2004, and received her commission on December 13, 2004. She assumed senior status on June 8, 2023. Alvarez moved her duty station to the United States District Court for the Western District of Texas on September 1, 2025.

== Other service ==
Alvarez also served on the President's Advisory Commission on Educational Excellence for Hispanic Americans.

== See also ==
- List of Hispanic and Latino American jurists
- List of first women lawyers and judges in Texas

== Sources ==
Legal offices
| Preceded by David Hittner | Judge of the United States District Court for the Southern District of Texas; 2004–2023 | Succeeded by John Marck |
