= Larry Taylor (politician) =

Texas State Senator

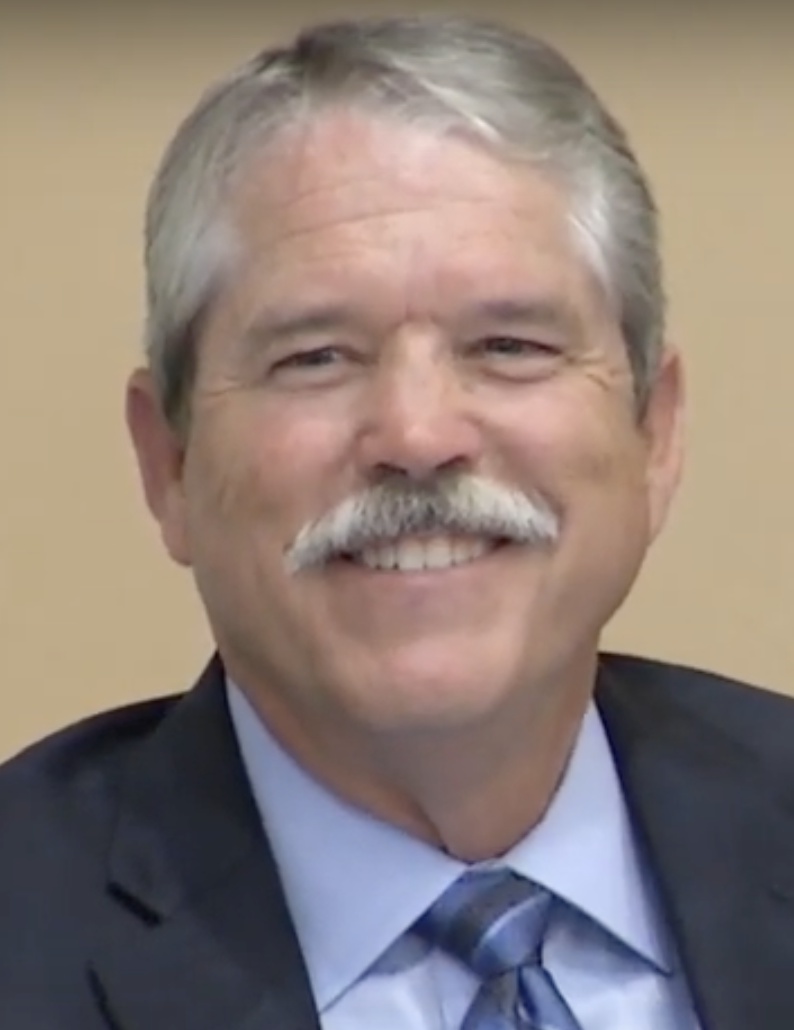
- Taylor in 2018

Majority Leader of the Texas Senate
- In office January 12, 2021 – January 25, 2023
- Preceded by: Paul Bettencourt
- Succeeded by: Angela Paxton

Member of the Texas Senate from the 11th district
- In office January 8, 2013 – January 10, 2023
- Preceded by: Mike Jackson
- Succeeded by: Mayes Middleton

Majority Leader of the Texas House of Representatives
- In office January 11, 2009 – December 2012
- Preceded by: Sid Miller
- Succeeded by: Myra Crownover (acting)

Member of the Texas House of Representatives from the 24th district
- In office January 14, 2003 – January 8, 2013
- Preceded by: Craig Eiland
- Succeeded by: Greg Bonnen

Personal details
- Born: June 25, 1960 (age 66) Friendswood, Texas, U.S.
- Party: Republican
- Spouse: Pam Taylor
- Children: 3
- Education: Baylor University (BBA)

Larry Taylor (born June 25, 1960) is a former Republican member of the Texas Senate. He was a member of the Texas House of Representatives from District 24 in Galveston County from 2003 to 2012.

== Early life, education, and career ==
Born and raised in Friendswood and a graduate of Friendswood High School. He then went on an attended to Baylor University, where he received a BBA in Business Administration in 1982. Since then he has helped managed and own his fathers insurance company in Friendswood.

In 2011, Taylor caused a controversy when he told the Texas Windstorm Insurance Association to be fair to policy holders and not "nitpick or Jew them down". He subsequently apologized for the slur, but was criticized by Democratic state representative Lon Burnam.

Taylor became chairman of the Texas Conservative Coalition Research Institute in February 2015.

Texas House of Representatives
Preceded by Sid Miller	Majority Leader of the Texas House of Representatives; 2009–2012	Succeeded by Myra Crownover; Acting
Texas Senate
Preceded by Paul Bettencourt	Majority Leader of the Texas Senate; 2021–2023	Succeeded by Angela Paxton
