= Chuck Rosenthal (district attorney) =

American lawyer (born 1946)

District Attorney of Harris County, Texas
- In office January 1, 2001 – February 15, 2008
- Preceded by: Johnny Holmes
- Succeeded by: Kenneth Magidson (interim)

Personal details
- Born: February 7, 1946 Alice, Texas, U.S.
- Died: November 23, 2023 (aged 77)
- Party: Republican
- Spouse: Cindy Rosenthal
- Education: Baylor University; South Texas College of Law

Charles A. Rosenthal (February 7, 1946 – November 23, 2023) was an American lawyer and former District Attorney of Harris County, Texas.

== Life and career ==
Born in Alice, Texas, and raised Baptist, Rosenthal attended Houston public schools, received his undergraduate degree from Baylor University, and went to law school at South Texas College of Law. He served as Harris County assistant district attorney under Carol Vance starting in March 1977.

After his predecessor, Johnny Holmes, retired, Rosenthal was elected Harris County District Attorney after facing Pat Lykos, County Attorney Michael Stafford and many others in the Republican primary. He was re-elected in 2004. Rosenthal was described as a "true believer in the death penalty," but won half as many death penalty cases as Holmes in the years leading up to his resignation.

On March 26, 2003, he argued before the Supreme Court of the United States in Lawrence v. Texas that laws against sodomy are constitutional. The Court disagreed, holding 6-3 that prosecutions for private sexual conduct violates the United States Constitution. His performance was later described as "the worst oral argument in years", but some believe his lack of preparation reflected his lack of enthusiasm for the statute he was defending.

Rosenthal's emails had been subpoenaed during an investigation into police misconduct in 2008. He was investigated for contempt of court for destroying evidence when he deleted many of the emails. Controversy also erupted when many of his emails included racist content, misuse of his government email for campaigning, and evidence of an affair with his secretary. After an emergency meeting with local GOP leaders, the GOP asked him to step aside and to not seek reelection. On January 4, 2008, he announced that he would not seek reelection, but would finish out his current term. On February 15, 2008, Rosenthal resigned as Harris County district attorney, following the filing of a lawsuit petitioning for his removal from office. An investigation found insufficient evidence to charge Rosenthal with any crimes in December 2008.

== Personal life ==
Rosenthal was married to Cindy Rosenthal, a retired FBI Special Agent.

== See also ==
- Podcast of the oral arguments before the US Supreme Court in Lawrence v. Texas
