= Austin Walton =

American sports agent

Austin G. Walton
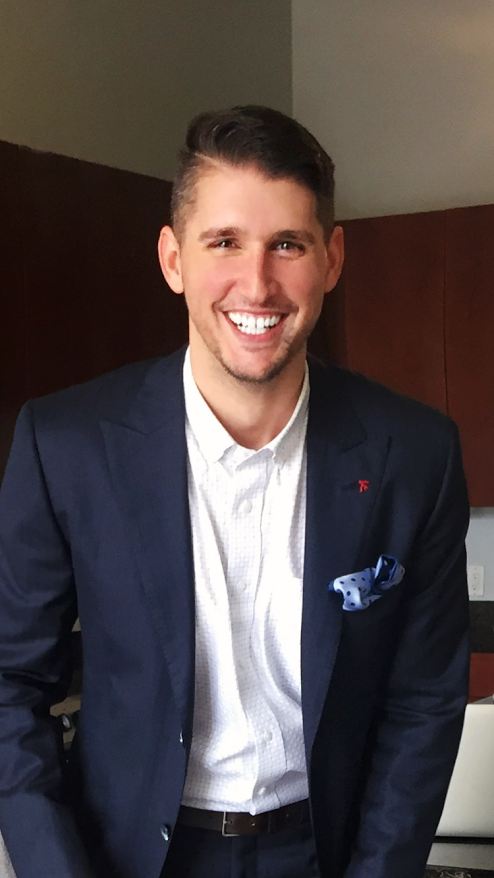
- Born: Newport News, Virginia
- Education: BBA in marketing, University of South Florida; MS in sports administration, Valparaiso University; J.D., South Texas College of Law
- Occupation: Sports agent
- Employer: NEXT SPORTS Agency
- Title: President and CEO

Austin Walton is an attorney and American sports agent who represents players in the National Basketball Association. He is the CEO and founder of NEXT SPORTS Agency, who represents Bones Hyland; Dean Wade; Aaron Wiggins; Kent Bazemore; Dereon Seabron and Jared Rhoden of the Denver Nuggets; Cleveland Cavaliers; Oklahoma City Thunder; Sacramento Kings; New Orleans Pelicans and Portland Trail Blazers.

== Early life ==
Walton was born in Newport News, Virginia. He attended the University of South Florida earning a bachelor's degree in Business Administration, majoring in marketing. He attained a Master of Science degree in Sports Administration from Valparaiso University, and a Juris Doctor (J.D.) degree from South Texas College of Law in Houston, Texas.

== Career ==
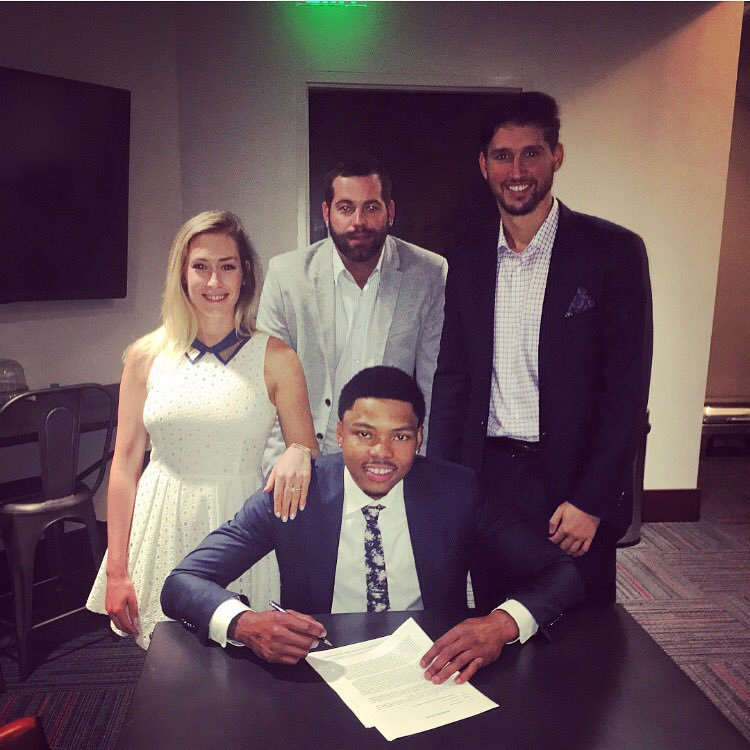
July 7, 2016, the signing of Kent Bazemore's 4-year, $70 million contract with the Atlanta Hawks.

Walton started a sports management company, Walton Sports Management Group, in 2009, becoming one of the youngest CEOs of a basketball agency at the time. Andrew Goudelock, the 46th overall pick in the 2011 NBA draft was Walton's first client. Walton has represented basketball players including NBA and international players. Most notably, he is known as being the agent for Kent Bazemore. Bazemore came into the NBA as an undrafted rookie, playing with the Oklahoma City Thunder and Golden State Warriors summer league teams, eventually signing with the Golden State Warriors. On July 1, 2016, Walton negotiated a $70 million contract over 4 years for Bazemore. The contract made Bazemore the highest paid undrafted player in the history of the NBA. In March 2016, ESPN writer Ethan Sherwood Strauss published a story about how Under Armour successfully signed away Stephen Curry from Nike in the 2013 offseason, and revealed that Bazemore played a significant role in the signing. Austin is currently CEO of NEXT SPORTS Agency, representing several NBA athletes.
