= Jim Sharp (justice) =

American judge

James Patrick "Jim" Sharp Jr.

Justice of the First Texas Court of Appeals
- In office January 2009 – December 2014

Personal details
- Born: c. 1952 Dallas, Texas
- Party: Democratic
- Spouse: Susan Sharp
- Education: University of Texas at Austin (B.A.); South Texas College of Law (J.D.)

James Patrick Sharp Jr. (born c. 1952), known as Jim Sharp, is a former justice of the First Texas Court of Appeals, based in Houston, Texas, serving from January 2009 to December 2014.

== Education and background ==
Sharp received a BA from the University of Texas at Austin and a JD from South Texas College of Law. Prior to attending law school, he worked for the Washington, D.C., political consulting firm of Matt Reese & Associates. Prior to being elected to the First Texas Court of Appeals, Sharp practiced as a general solo practitioner for nineteen years.

== Judicial career ==
Sharp was elected to the First Court of Appeals in November 2008 as part of a Democratic sweep that also replaced many Republican incumbents with Democrats in the Harris County courthouse. A Dallas native, Sharp was the court's only Democrat during his time of office. He ran for re-election to a second six-year term in 2014. Sharp was unopposed in the Democratic primary election but lost to his Republican opponent in the general election. The Houston Chronicle had recommended that Justice Sharp not be reelected because of his disciplinary record while on the appellate bench.

In 2016, Sharp lost his bid for the Place 2 seat on the 14th Circuit Court of Appeals, which encompasses part of Harris and nine other counties, including Washington, garnering 30 percent of the vote.

== Disciplinary history ==
In 2012, Justice Sharp was barred from hearing a neighboring county's cases in a dispute over a shoplifting charge against a friend's daughter. Sharp tried to use his influence improperly demand the girl's release from a juvenile detention facility. In a voice mail to a state district court judge in Brazoria County Sharp said, in reference to a detention supervisor, "If I had been there in person and had a baseball bat, that (expletive) would have been cracked upside the head." Sharp went on to call Brazoria County authorities as "a bunch of backwoods hillbillies." Brazoria County District Attorney Jeri Yenne filed a complaint with the State Commission on Judicial Conduct and asked that Sharp be recused from Brazoria County cases, a request granted by the Court of Appeals.
