= Terri Leo-Wilson =

American politician

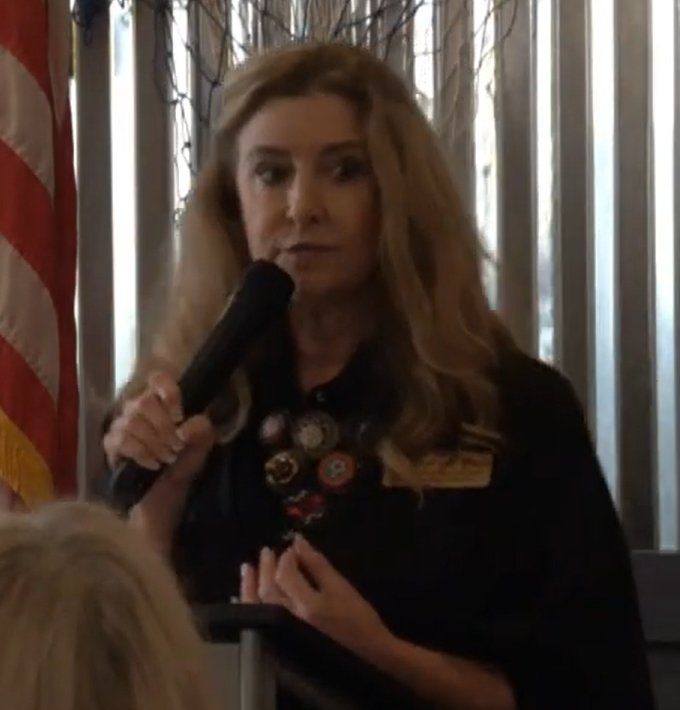

Member of the Texas House of Representatives from the 23rd district
- Incumbent
- Assumed office January 10, 2023
- Preceded by: Mayes Middleton

Personal details
- Born: January 3, 1960 (age 66) Worthington, Minnesota
- Party: Republican
- Spouse: David Wilson (m. 2018)
- Children: 5
- Education: University of North Dakota; Texas A&M–Commerce
- Occupation: Politician
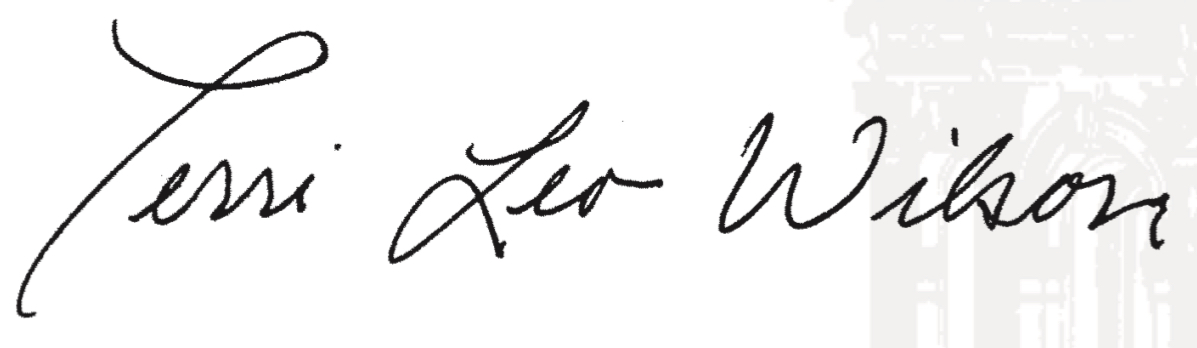
- Signature
- Website: Campaign website

Terri Leo-Wilson (born January 3, 1960) is an American businesswoman and politician. She is the Republican member of the Texas House of Representatives for District 23, including Texas City, Chambers County, and nearly half of Galveston County. Before her membership in the House, Leo-Wilson served three terms on the State Board of Education. She is also a former public school teacher. Wilson utilizes "Teresa S. Wilson" when filing Texas campaign finance reports, with Terri being an assumed nickname.

== Political career ==
Leo-Wilson's initial foray into public service was working as a case manager, teacher, and department administrator in Texas public schools. Her work on this level was focused on promoting the needs of people with disabilities.

After becoming increasingly involved in the Texas Republican Convention, Leo-Wilson first ran for elected office in 2002, when she ran in the primary for the State Board of Education's 6th District, then based in Harris County. She would win the 2002 primary election for the district with 23,703 votes (55.43%) to her opponent, Doug Cannon's, 19,060 votes (44.57%). She went unopposed in the general election. Two years later, she would run for re-election, winning the primary by a similar margin. Again, she went unopposed in the general election. In her final primary election for the district, she went unopposed in the primary election but faced an opponent in the general election for the first time. She won the general election against Libertarian party candidate Mary Ann Bryan with nearly 80% of the vote to Bryan's approximately 20%. While serving on the SBOE, she served as the vice chairman of the board, chairman of the instruction committee and chairman of the Texas State Teacher of the Year Selection Committee. She retired from the board in 2012.

Leo-Wilson placed second in the first round of the 2022 Republican Primary election for District 23, advancing to the runoff along with Greg Abbott's endorsed candidate Patrick Gurski, a Galveston attorney. Leo-Wilson won the runoff in May by a margin of 5,224 votes (57.67%) to Gurski's 3,835 (42.33%) In the general election, she won her heavily Republican district with 35,559 votes (63.78%) to her opponent, Keith G. Henry's, 20,192 votes (36.22%). In her first term, she served on the Juvenile Justice & Family Issues and Pensions, Investment & Financial Services committees.

Leo-Wilson was challenged in the 2026 Republican primary by Former Mont Belvieu City Manager Nathan Watkins.

== Personal life ==
Leo-Wilson was born in Worthington, Minnesota on January 3, 1960, to a family of crop farmers. Though her parents were not outspokenly political, she has said, "We watched the news, and I knew my parents cared about politics, but you just didn't speak out loud where you stood politically."

After graduating from high school, she graduated with her undergraduate degree from the University of North Dakota, where she graduated summa cum laude, before moving to Spring, Texas, to attend Texas A&M–Commerce. She matriculated with a master's degree in educational administration. After becoming more involved in the state Republican party conventions, she served on numerous committees, including as the chairman of the national nominations committee. Leo-Wilson married her husband, politician David Wilson, in 2018. Together, they have five children: three from their current marriage and two from David's previous marriage. She and her new family moved to Galveston, Texas; she has said they "love the coastal vibe" of the city. They quickly became enmeshed in the city's politics, including involvement in the Galveston Chamber of Commerce.

Texas House of Representatives
Preceded by Mayes Middleton	Member of the Texas House of Representatives from the 23rd district 2023–present	Incumbent
