= Linda Garcia (politician) =

American politician

Linda García

Member of the Texas House of Representatives from the 107th district
- Incumbent
- Assumed office January 14, 2025
- Preceded by: Victoria Neave

Personal details
- Party: Democratic
- Education: Northwood University

Linda García is an American financial educator and politician serving as a member of the Texas House of Representatives for the 107th District since 2025. She was encouraged to run for the seat by incumbent Victoria Neave, who decided to run for the Texas State Senate, and was elected unopposed in 2024.

Garcia grew up between Orange County, California and Dallas in a split household. She had her first child at 14. She attended Thomas Jefferson High School and graduated from Northwood University. While working at Netflix, she began investing and grew interested in the stock market. She began teaching online courses on financial literacy and investing, leading to a book deal with Hachette Book Group.
