= Alamdar S. Hamdani =

American lawyer

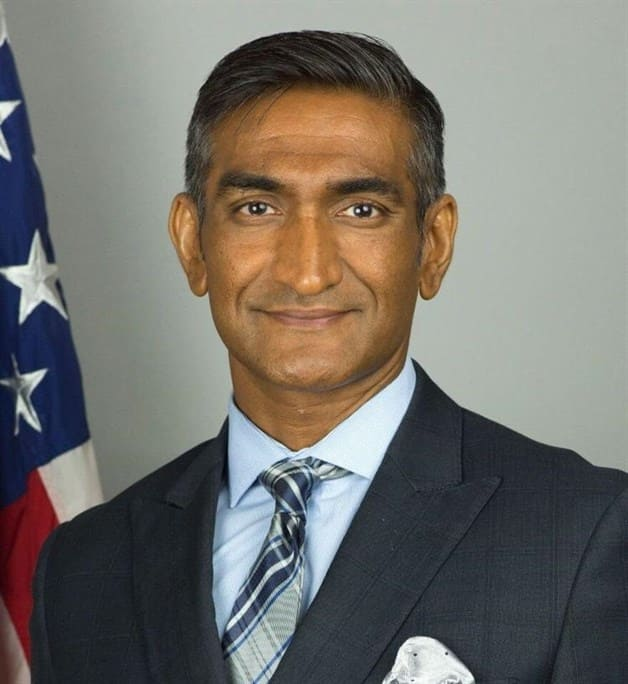

United States Attorney for the Southern District of Texas
- In office December 12, 2022 – January 19, 2025
- Appointed by: Joe Biden
- Preceded by: Ryan Patrick
- Succeeded by: Nicholas Ganjei (acting)

Personal details
- Born: 1971 or 1972 (age 53–54) Manchester, England
- Education: University of Texas at Austin (BBA); University of Houston (JD)

Alamdar S. Hamdani (born 1971 or 1972) is an American lawyer who served as the United States attorney for the Southern District of Texas from December 12, 2022, to January 19, 2025. He is a partner at Bracewell LLP.

== Early life and education ==
Hamdani was born in Manchester, England, to Indian parents who had moved there from Surat, Gujarat, India. He moved with his family to Euless, Texas, at the age of ten, and graduated from Trinity High School there in 1989. He received a Bachelor of Business Administration in finance from the University of Texas at Austin in 1993 and a Juris Doctor from the University of Houston Law Center in 1999.

== Career ==
From 1999 to 2001, Hamdani was an associate at Dow, Cogburn & Friedman PC. From 2001 to 2005, he was an associate at Winstead Sechrest & Minick PC. From 2005 to 2008, he was a founding partner of Hamdani & Simon LLP. From 2008 to 2012, he was an assistant United States attorney in the Eastern District of Kentucky. From 2012 to 2014, he served as deputy chief of the counterterrorism section of the National Security Division at the Department of Justice. From 2014 through 2022, he served as an assistant United States attorney in the United States Attorney's Office for the Southern District of Texas. Upon leaving the U.S. Attorney's office in 2025, Hamdani became a litigation partner at the international law firm Bracewell LLP.

=== Notable cases ===
Hamdani co-prosecuted the case of Leatrice Malika DeBruhl-Daniels, an NCIS agent convicted of "obstructing justice, making false statements, and accepting money and gifts for official acts". She failed to disclose her relationship with Nadal Diya, a Syrian businessman living in Dubai, from whom she accepted gifts and revealed to him the status of his visa application and other classified national security information, including that Diya was the subject of a counterterrorism investigation.

=== U.S. attorney for the Southern District of Texas ===
On October 14, 2022, President Joe Biden announced his intent to nominate Hamdani to be the United States attorney for the Southern District of Texas. On November 14, 2022, his nomination was sent to the United States Senate. On December 1, 2022, his nomination was reported out of the Senate Judiciary Committee by voice vote. On December 6, 2022, his nomination was confirmed in the Senate by voice vote. He was sworn in by District Judge Randy Crane on December 12, 2022. He is the first Asian American and Pacific Islander to serve as a U.S. Attorney in the state of Texas. Hamdani was recommended to the post by Senators John Cornyn and Ted Cruz.

Legal offices
Preceded by Ryan Patrick	United States Attorney for the Southern District of Texas; 2022–2025	Succeeded by Nicholas J. Ganjei; Acting
