= Aaron Reitz =

American attorney (born 1987)

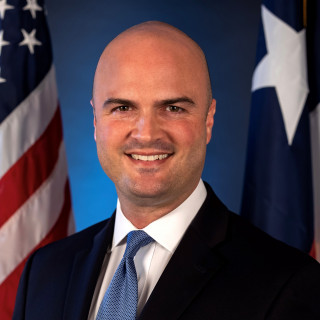
- Official portrait, 2025

United States Attorney for the Southern District of Texas
- Incumbent
- Assumed office July 9, 2026
- Appointed by: U.S. District Court for S.D. Tex.
- President: Donald Trump
- Preceded by: Alamdar S. Hamdani

United States Assistant Attorney General for the Office of Legal Policy
- In office March 31, 2025 – June 11, 2025
- President: Donald Trump
- Preceded by: Hampton Dellinger
- Succeeded by: Daniel E. Burrows

Personal details
- Born: Aaron Francis Reitz; May 22, 1987 (age 39)
- Party: Republican
- Education: Texas A&M University (BS); University of Texas, Austin (JD)

Military service
- Allegiance: United States
- Branch/service: United States Marine Corps; Marine Corps Reserve
- Years of service: 2009–2014 (active); 2014–present (reserve)
- Rank: Major
- Battles/wars: War in Afghanistan
- Awards: Marine Corps Achievement Medal; Navy Meritorious Unit Commendation; Selected Marine Corps Reserve Medal; Afghanistan Campaign Medal; Sea Service Deployment Ribbon; NATO Medal-ISAF Afghanistan; Global War on Terrorism Service Medal; National Defense Service Medal

Aaron Francis Reitz (born May 22, 1987) is an American attorney who served as the assistant attorney general for the United States Department of Justice's Office of Legal Policy from March 2025 until his resignation in June 2025. He was appointed United States attorney for the Southern District of Texas on July 9, 2026, by the United States District Court for the Southern District of Texas itself. He previously served as the chief of staff to Senator Ted Cruz and as the deputy attorney general for legal strategy in the Texas attorney general's office.

== Early life and education ==
Reitz was born on May 22, 1987, in New Haven, Connecticut. He moved to San Antonio, Texas, in 2000 and attended Barbara Bush Middle School and Ronald Reagan High School. In 2009, he graduated from Texas A&M University with a Bachelor of Science, magna cum laude and Phi Beta Kappa. While at A&M, Reitz was a member of the Corps of Cadets, achieving the rank of Cadet Colonel. He was a recipient of a Naval Reserve Officers Training Corps scholarship. In 2017, he graduated from the University of Texas School of Law with a Juris Doctor.

== Career ==
After graduating from Texas A&M University, Reitz commissioned as a United States Marine Corps Officer and served in active duty for nearly five years. During his active duty, Reitz deployed to the Helmand Province, Afghanistan. Reitz is currently a Major in Marine Corps Reserve, having earned the rank of Major in September 2020. From 2017 to 2018, Reitz worked as an associate attorney at Bracewell LLP in Houston, Texas. Reitz then clerked for Justice Jimmy Blacklock on the Supreme Court of Texas.

In 2020, Reitz ran unsuccessfully for the Texas House of Representatives, placing fourth in the Republican primary for district 47, with 15% of the vote.

From 2020 to 2023, Reitz served as the Deputy Attorney General for Legal Strategy in the Office of the Texas Attorney General. During this time, Reitz was also a Senior Advisor on Ken Paxton's 2022 re-election campaign.

After leaving the Texas AG's office, Reitz was employed as chief of staff to Senator Ted Cruz. He was nominated for the role of Assistant Attorney General for the Office of Legal Policy by President Donald Trump, and confirmed by the U.S. Senate by a vote of 52-46 on March 26, 2025. He was sworn in by Attorney General Pam Bondi on March 31, 2025.

On June 11, 2025, Reitz announced his resignation from the Department of Justice, and stated his intention to return to Texas. The following day, he announced that he would run for Attorney General of Texas in 2026, seeking to succeed Paxton, who was retiring to run for U.S. Senate.

Reitz was unsuccessful in the March 3, 2026, Republican primary, finishing fourth among four candidates with 14.2% of the vote (293,698 votes), behind Mayes Middleton, Chip Roy, and Joan Huffman.

== Controversies ==
=== Social media controversy ===
Reitz's use of social media has drawn criticism throughout his career.

In March 2025, CBS News reported that Reitz had deleted approximately 4,000 tweets from his X account prior to his confirmation hearings. Among the deleted posts were remarks that critics described as fringe, including a comment about a March 2020 ruling by U.S. District Judge Lee Yeakel, stating, "Judge Yeakel has made his decision. Now let him enforce it," in reference to an order blocking Texas from closing an abortion clinic during the COVID‑19 pandemic. He has called for rolling back reforms to mandatory minimum sentences, posting, "make mandatory minimums great again". He wrote, "The more one realizes that marriage is more of a public institution than a private one, the more 'arranged' marriages (rightly understood and coupled with some limited/guiding principles) makes a lot of sense." Other posts included a message next to a photo of Senator Joseph McCarthy that read, "Bring back the good 'ol days," and statements advocating for arranged marriages under certain conditions.

In July 2021, while serving as Deputy Texas Attorney General, Reitz criticized gymnast Simone Biles after she withdrew from competition at the Tokyo Olympics to focus on her mental health. Reitz retweeted a video of Kerri Strug's 1996 Olympic vault and referred to Biles as a "selfish, childish national embarrassment." The tweet was widely criticized, including by his boss and fellow conservative Texas Attorney General Ken Paxton, who called it "very inappropriate and insensitive." Reitz later deleted the tweet and issued a public apology, stating: "I owe @Simone_Biles an apology. A big one ... In a moment of frustration and disappointment, I opined on subjects for which I am not adequately versed ... Simone Biles is a true patriot and one of the greatest gymnasts of our time."

=== Comments during DOJ confirmation hearing (February 2025) ===
During his Senate Judiciary Committee confirmation hearing as nominee to lead the Department of Justice's Office of Legal Policy, Reitz was questioned about whether court orders must always be followed. He responded that such matters were "too hypothetical" and "so fact‑, law‑ and case‑specific that one cannot speak generally." Reitz emphasized that legal compliance depends on the specific scope of rulings, noting this reflects "a fairly mainstream view within right‑of‑center jurisprudential circles." His answers drew concern from senators, with some warning that any suggestion of defying court orders undermines the separation of powers.

=== Criticism over resignation to run for office (July 2025) ===
In July 2025, less than three months after being confirmed to lead the DOJ's Office of Legal Policy, Reitz resigned to run for Texas Attorney General. His decision prompted criticism from some political observers and lawmakers who felt the confirmation process had been a waste of time given his short tenure. Senator John Cornyn of Texas responded to news of Reitz's resignation by saying, "Didn't last long," and added, "May the best man win" when asked about the race. Senate Minority Whip Dick Durbin expressed surprise at the announcement, stating, "His position dealt with judicial nominees—we have not received many from the White House. I was anxious to get him in place, and apparently he's gone."

=== Letter to Elizabeth Warren (November 2026) ===
On November 15, 2026, Reitz sent a letter to Senator Elizabeth Warren of Massachusetts calling on her to "preserve all documents, communications, and other electronically stored information relevant to your intent to weaponize congressional investigations and deprive citizens of their core constitutional rights in violation of 18 U.S.C. §§ 241 and 242." Reitz also ordered Warren to "preserve all potentially relevant evidence related to your efforts to suppress associational activities related to President Trump and the Trump administration," further threatening her with legal action if she did not fulfill these obligations. The letter cited statements she had made related to promises to investigate "'big tech CEOs, Wall Street executives, and giant corporations who may have broken the law'" and regarding Trump's "'astonishing brazenness'" in his efforts "'to reengineer the federal government into a corruption machine designed to rake in profits for himself, his family, and his cronies.'" The letter also contained numerous references to Warren's previous claims of Native American ancestry, such as that her actions sent "a strong smoke signal" and that she wanted to "wield [her] future gavel like a tomahawk, hunting for the scalps of President Trump's private associates." The letter to Warren came on the heels of similar letters Reitz sent to Senators Richard Blumenthal of Connecticut and Elissa Slotkin of Michigan ordering them to preserve documents related to their own promised investigations of Trump officials and threatening them with similar legal consequences.

== Personal life ==
Reitz and his wife Meredith met in high school. They have four children and reside in Austin, Texas.
