= Nicholas Ganjei =

American judge (born 1979)

Nicholas Jon Ganjei
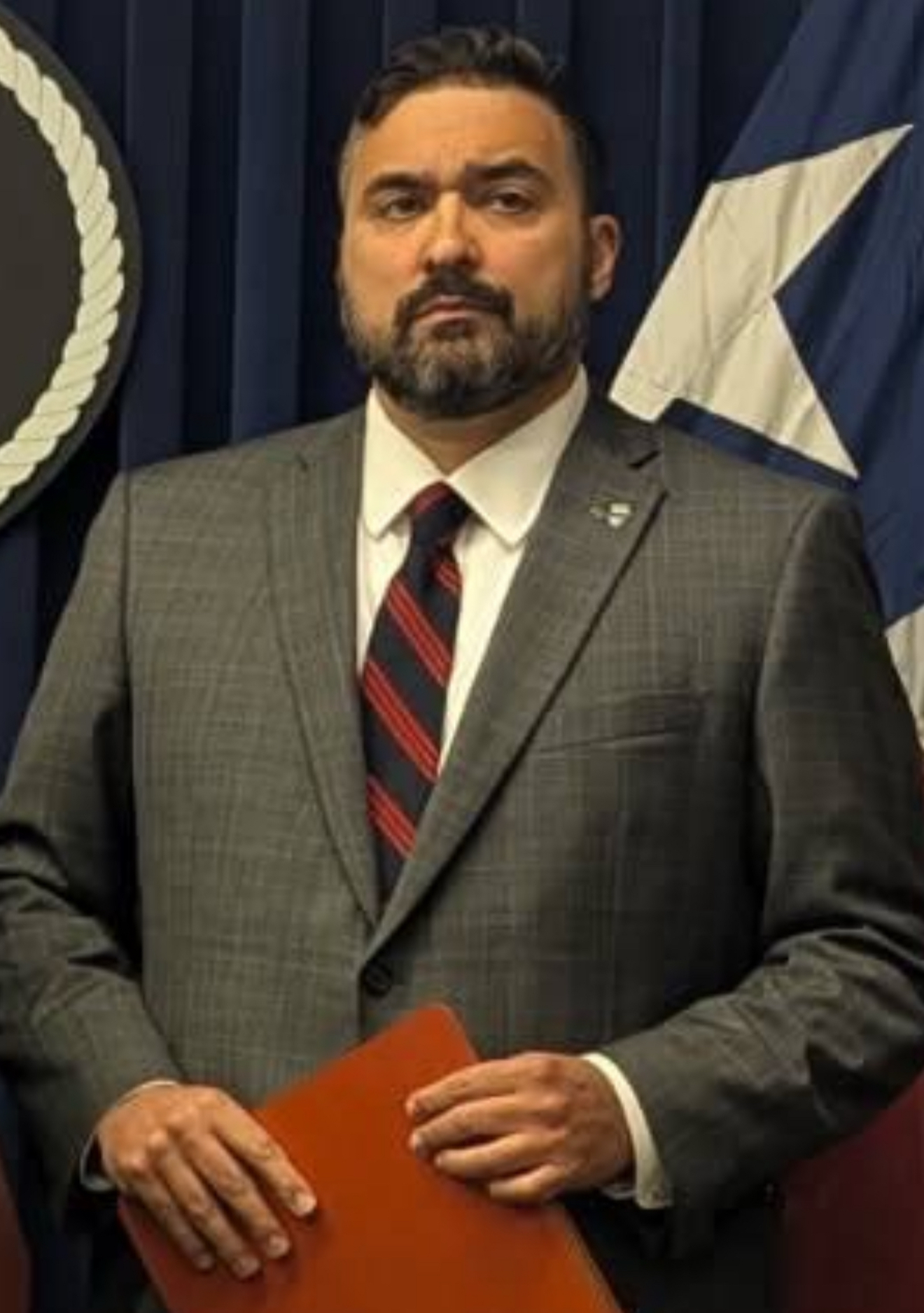

Judge of the United States District Court for the Southern District of Texas
- Incumbent
- Assumed office March 10, 2026
- Appointed by: Donald Trump
- Preceded by: Lynn Hughes

United States Attorney for the Southern District of Texas
- In office January 29, 2025 – March 10, 2026
- President: Donald Trump
- Preceded by: Alamdar S. Hamdani
- Succeeded by: John Marck

Acting United States Attorney for the Eastern District of Texas
- In office January 20, 2021 – November 16, 2021
- President: Joe Biden
- Preceded by: Stephen J. Cox
- Succeeded by: Brit Featherston

Personal details
- Born: 1979 (age 46–47) Santa Clara, California, U.S.
- Education: American University (BA); University of California, Berkeley (JD)

Nicholas Jon Ganjei (born 1979) is a United States district judge of the United States District Court for the Southern District of Texas. He previously served as United States attorney for the Southern District of Texas from January 2025 to March 2026.

== Early life and education ==
Ganjei was born in 1979, in Santa Clara, California. He attained the rank of Eagle Scout in the Boy Scouts of America in 1997. He received a Bachelor of Arts degree in 2000, cum laude from American University with a dual major in history and political science. He received a Juris Doctor in 2005 from UC Berkeley School of Law. Since 2023, he is studying at the Van Andel School of Government at Hillsdale College working on a Master in Government degree.

== Career ==
From 2005 to 2007, Ganjei served as a law clerk for Ralph R. Erickson, then a United States district judge for the United States District Court for the District of North Dakota. He served as a law clerk for Richard Allen Griffin of the United States Court of Appeals for the Sixth Circuit. From 2008 to 2020, he served as an assistant United States attorney in the District of New Mexico. He served as first assistant United States attorney in the Eastern District of Texas from June 2020 to January 2021 and as Acting United States attorney from January 2021 to November 2021. He served as chief counsel to United States Senator Ted Cruz from 2022 to 2025. Ganjei was appointed United States attorney by Acting Attorney General James McHenry in January 2025. In May 2025, Ganjei received the unanimous vote of the judges of the Southern District of Texas, re-appointing him as U.S. attorney for the Southern District. Ganjei served as United States Attorney for the Southern District of Texas from January 2025 until his appointment to the federal bench in March 2026.

=== Federal judicial service ===
Circa October 28, 2025, President Donald Trump transmitted a filled out Senate Judiciary Committee Questionnaire for United States district judge for Ganjei, prima facie evidence that Ganjei's nomination to that office was forthcoming, to the seat on the United States District Court for the Southern District of Texas vacated by Judge Lynn Hughes. Trump announced his nomination on Truth Social on November 12, 2025. The nomination was formally transmitted to the United States Senate on November 18, 2025. On November 19, 2025, a hearing on his nomination was held by the United States Senate Judiciary Committee. On December 11, 2025, the committee voted to report his nomination to the Senate by a 12–10 party-line vote. On February 3, 2026, the Senate invoked cloture on his nomination by a 49–44 vote. Later that day, his nomination was confirmed by a 51–45 vote. He received his judicial commission on March 10, 2026.

== Personal ==
Ganjei is the first Persian-American to serve as a United States Attorney or as a federal Article III judge. He resides in Houston, Texas.

Legal offices
Preceded by Alamdar S. Hamdani	United States Attorney for the Southern District of Texas; 2025–2026	Succeeded by John Marck
Preceded by Lynn Hughes	Judge of the United States District Court for the Southern District of Texas; 2026–present	Incumbent
