= Texas's 107th House of Representatives district =

American legislative district

Texas's 107th State House of Representatives district
Representative
Linda Garcia; D–Dallas
- Demographics: 19.3% White; 16.0% Black; 61.6% Hispanic; 2.7% Asian
- Population (2020) • Voting age: 184,603; 132,648

The 107th district of the Texas House of Representatives consists of portions of east Dallas, Mesquite, and south Garland in Dallas County. The current representative is Linda Garcia, who has represented the district since 2025.
