= Texas's 23rd House of Representatives district =

American legislative district

Texas's 23rd State House of Representatives district
Representative
Terri Leo-Wilson; R–Galveston
since January 10th, 2023
- Demographics: 51.4% White; 15.7% Black; 28.4% Hispanic; 3.0% Asian
- Population (2020): 198,405

District 23 is a district in the Texas House of Representatives. It was created in the 3rd legislature (1849–1851).

The district encompasses all of Chambers County, and nearly half of Galveston County. It also includes the cities of Mont Belvieu, Galveston, nearly the entirety of Texas City, and the Bolivar Peninsula.

== Elections ==
General Election 2022: District 23
Party	Candidate	Votes	%	±%
Republican	Terri Leo-Wilson	35,559	63.8	+ 3.6
Democratic	Keith Henry	20,192	36.2	− 3.6

General Election 2020: District 23
Party	Candidate	Votes	%	±%
Republican	Mayes Middleton	47,068	60.2	+ 3.7
Democratic	Jeff Antonelli	31,154	39.8	− 1.6

General Election 2018: District 23
Party	Candidate	Votes	%	±%
Republican	Mayes Middleton	32,951	56.5	+0
Democratic	Amanda Jamrok	24,181	41.4	+0
