= South Texas College of Law Houston =

Private law school in Houston, Texas, US

Coordinates: 29.7529°N 95.3648°W

- Motto: Justitia et Veritas Praevaleant (Latin); Let Justice and Truth Prevail
- Established: 1923; 103 years ago
- School type: Private law school
- Dean: Reynaldo Anaya Valencia
- Location: Houston, Texas, U.S.
- Enrollment: 975
- Faculty: 64 full-time
- USNWR ranking: 138th (2025)
- Bar pass rate: 91.63% (July 2024)
- Website: www.stcl.edu

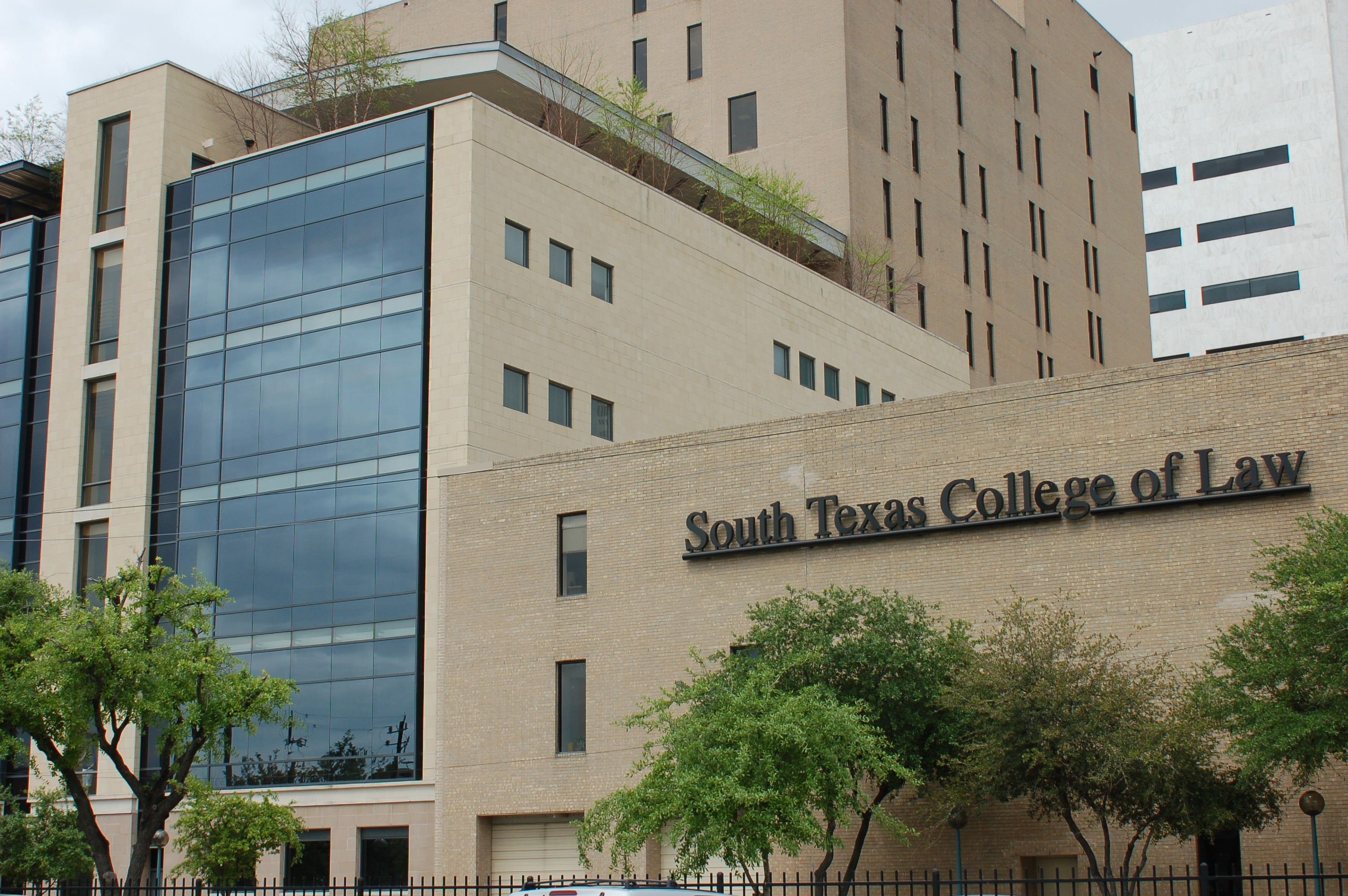
South Texas College of Law

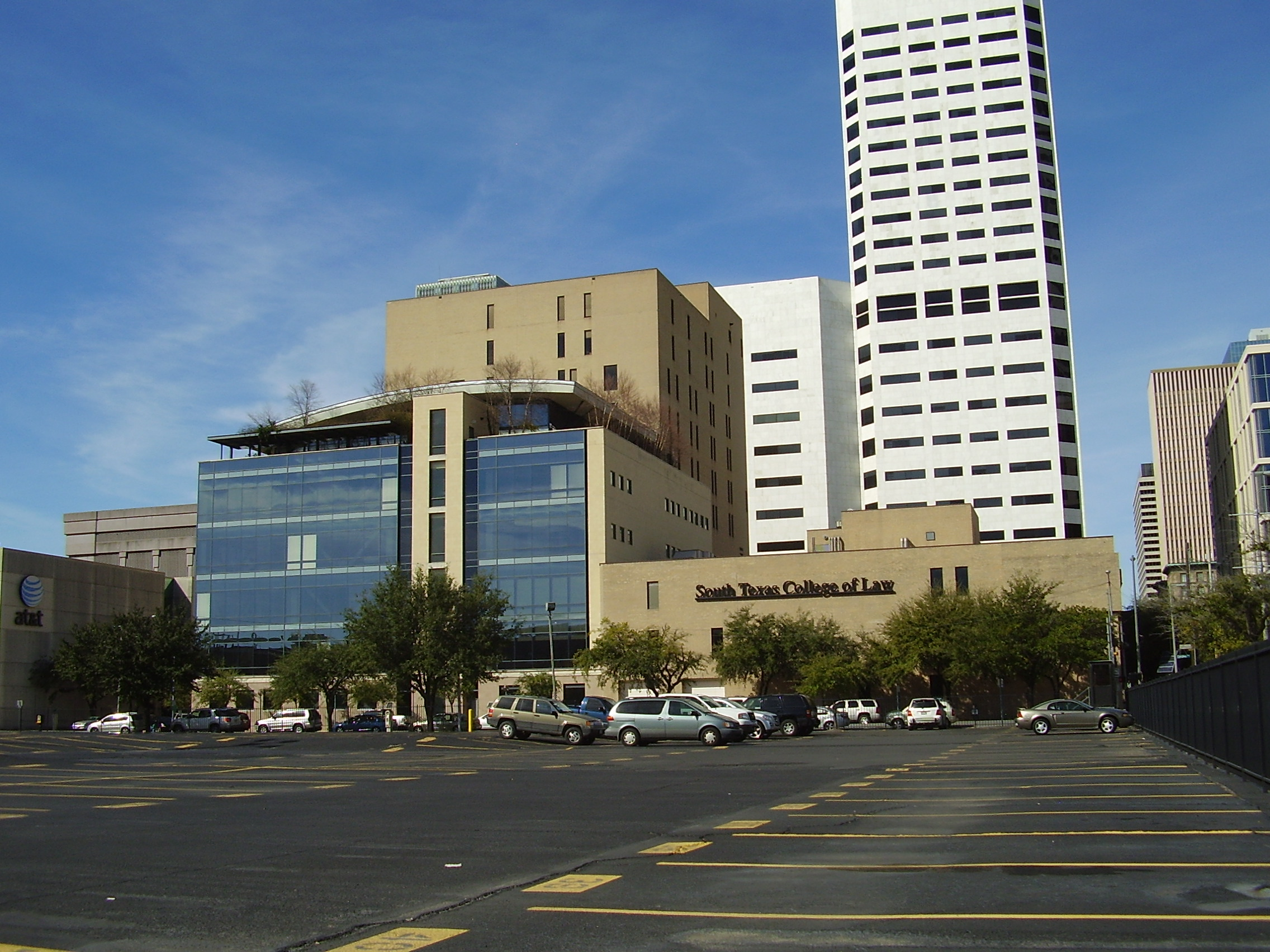
The rear of South Texas College of Law, with the law library enclosed in glass

South Texas College of Law Houston (STCL or South Texas) is a private law school in Houston, Texas. It was founded in 1923 when the YMCA made the decision to establish a law school with a focus on offering night classes for working professionals. It is accredited by the American Bar Association. South Texas College of Law Houston is the oldest law school in the city of Houston.

== Academics ==
South Texas College of Law Houston is one of four American law schools (along with the California Western School of Law, New England School of Law, and William Mitchell College of Law) that make up the Consortium for Innovative Legal Education. The consortium combines the resources of the schools for access to educational programs on a national and international basis.

Students at South Texas can study abroad in London, Ireland, Malta, the Czech Republic, France, the Netherlands, Denmark, Turkey, Chile, and Mexico.

=== Admissions ===
For the class entering in 2023, South Texas accepted 44% of applicants, with 42% of those accepted enrolling. The average enrollee had a 153 LSAT score and 3.36 undergraduate GPA.

=== Rankings ===
For 2024, U.S. News & World Report Rankings of Best Law Schools ranked South Texas College of Law overall 138th out of the 195 accredited law schools in the United States, and its part-time program was ranked 50th in the country out of the 67 law schools considered.

=== Trial advocacy, ADR, and moot court programs ===
South Texas College of Law Houston has won 136 national championships in advocacy. Its trial advocacy program consistently ranks in the top 10 of the nation. The College of Law’s moot court program was ranked 1st in the nation according to data compiled by the University of Houston Law Center’s Blakely Advocacy Institute in 2018 and has consistently ranked in the top 4 ever since. Its trial advocacy program was ranked 3rd in the country (tied with Stetson University and American University) for 2023 by U.S. News & World Report. The College of Law’s Alternate Dispute Resolution Program (ADR), where students compete in competitive mediations, negotiations, and as mediators, in 2020 was ranked by U.S. News & World Report 31st in the nation. Additionally, PreLaw Magazine named South Texas College of Law Houston as "Top Law School for ADR".

== Bar passage ==
Of the South Texas College of Law Houston graduates who took the Texas bar exam for the first time in July 2024, 91.6% passed (4th highest among all Texas law schools), vs the overall passage rate of 87.1% for all other law schools of the State of Texas.

== Employment ==
According to South Texas College of Law Houston's official 2021 ABA-required disclosures, 66% of the class of 2021 obtained full-time, long-term, JD-required employment (i.e., as attorneys) nine months after graduation.

== Publications ==
South Texas College of Law Houston publishes several student-edited journals of legal scholarship, including Corporate Counsel Review, Currents: Journal of International Economic Law, South Texas Law Review, Texas Journal of Business Law, and Hispanic Journal of Law and Policy

- South Texas Law Review is a student-edited quarterly legal journal published at the South Texas College of Law Houston. It was established in 1954. The review publishes scholarly works as well as comments and case notes. South Texas Law Review has published symposium issues on a wide range of topics. Since 1994, the review and the law school have hosted an annual ethics symposium during the fall semester where authors present papers on the year's topic which are published by the review in a subsequent volume.
- Currents (ISSN 1534-388X) is the official journal of international economic law at South Texas College of Law Houston first published in the winter of 1991 and published twice annually by the law student members and editors, who receive academic credit for writing projects and staff participation.

== Community resources ==
South Texas sponsors the "Direct Representation Clinics", which provide legal representation to low-income residents of Harris County, Texas, in the areas of family law, probate, estate planning, and guardianship cases. South Texas is also the first Texas law school to provide $400 each month toward student-loan indebtedness for its alumni working for nonprofit legal-aid organizations that provide services to the poor.

== Costs ==
Total cost of tuition is $35,550 for 2020, for both in-state and out-of-state students. South Texas College of Law continues to be the 6th least expensive law school in Texas out of a total of 10. The total cost of attendance (indicating the cost of tuition, fees, and living expenses) at South Texas for the 2017–2018 academic year was $56,000.

== Attempt to merge with Texas A&M University ==
In 1998, South Texas College of Law Houston (at that time, called South Texas College of Law) tried to merge with Texas A&M University under a private/public partnership. Under the proposal, the law school would have remained a private school, but would have been branded as the Texas A&M Law Center and would have awarded law degrees under the A&M seal. The deal went sour after a lengthy legal fight with the Texas Higher Education Coordinating Board, the governing body of the state's public institutions. The courts ruled that the schools had failed to obtain the board's approval before entering into the agreement. The University of Houston and other institutions voiced concern about the partnership. In 2013, Texas A&M University entered into a similar arrangement with the Texas Wesleyan School of Law in Fort Worth, Texas, thereby creating the Texas A&M University School of Law.

== Litigation over name change ==
Until mid-2016, the law school was called "South Texas College of Law". On June 22, 2016, the day on which South Texas College of Law announced a name change to "Houston College of Law", the University of Houston (which has its college of law within the University of Houston Law Center) announced that the university was "concerned about the significant confusion this creates in the marketplace and will take any and all appropriate legal actions to protect the interests of our institution, our brand, and our standing in the communities we serve." The University of Houston System filed a lawsuit on June 27, 2016, in the United States District Court in Houston. On October 14, 2016, the U.S. District Court issued a preliminary injunction requiring that South Texas College of Law stop using the name "Houston College of Law," pending further developments in the case.

On November 7, 2016, the dean of the law school announced that the name would be changed to "South Texas College of Law Houston".

== Notable alumni ==
- Katy Padilla Stout, US representative-elect from Texas.
- Richard H. Anderson, former president and CEO of Amtrak, former CEO of Northwest Airlines, former CEO of Delta Air Lines
- Phillip Benjamin Baldwin (deceased), former senior judge of the United States Court of Appeals for the Federal Circuit; previously associate judge of the United States Court of Customs and Patent Appeals by nomination of President Lyndon B. Johnson and confirmation by the United States Senate on July 25, 1968.
- Chris Bell, former member, Houston City Council, former member, United States House of Representatives representing the 25th Congressional District in Houston
- Briscoe Cain, member of the Texas House of Representatives
- Robert R. Casey (deceased), former congressman
- John Culberson, former congressman
- John P. Devine, Texas Supreme Court justice
- Joseph Gutheinz, attorney who has investigated stolen and missing Moon rocks
- Eva Guzman, former Texas Supreme Court justice
- Brad Hart, former mayor of Cedar Rapids, Iowa
- Charles Holcomb, former judge of the Texas Court of Criminal Appeals, 2001 to 2010
- Philip A. Holloway, attorney and legal analyst
- Paul John Hilbert (deceased), former member of the Texas House of Representatives
- Joan Huffman, member of the Texas State Senate; former state district court judge
- Janis Graham Jack, United States District Court Judge, Southern District of Texas
- Patrica R. "Pat" Lykos, former Harris County district attorney
- David M. Medina, former justice of the Texas Supreme Court
- Sam Nuchia, former chief of the Houston Police Department
- Reed O'Connor, United States district judge for the Northern District of Texas
- Kim Ogg, Harris County district attorney from 2017-2025.
- Madalyn Murray O'Hair (deceased), founder of American Atheists, did not pass the bar exam and never practiced law
- Dan Rather, American journalist, commentator, and former editor and anchor of CBS Evening News (did not graduate)
- Sue Schechter, member of the Texas House of Representatives (1991-1995)
- Jim Sharp, former justice of the First Texas Courts of Appeals based in Houston, 2009–2014
- Robert Talton, former member of the Texas House of Representatives
- Austin Walton, certified NBA agent and owner of Walton Sports Management Group
