= Pat Lykos =

American lawyer

Patricia R. Lykos

District Attorney of Harris County, Texas
- In office 2009–2012

Personal details
- Born: Patricia R. Lykos
- Spouse(s): William A. "Bill" Allen, CPA/JD (1976 to present)
- Education: University of Houston (BS); South Texas College of Law (JD)

Patricia R. "Pat" Lykos is an American lawyer who served as District Attorney of Harris County, Texas from 2009 to 2012.

== Education ==
Lykos graduated from the University of Houston in 1967 with a Bachelor of Science degree in political science. Lykos earned her Doctor of Jurisprudence in 1971 from South Texas College of Law. She worked her way through college and law school while employed full-time as a Houston police officer.

== Career ==
As a lawyer, she practiced in state, county, district and appellate courts and in federal court, litigating civil, criminal and family law matters. In 1980, the Harris County Commissioners' Court appointed her to the newly created bench of County Criminal Court No. 10, to which she won election that year.

In 1981, Republican Governor Bill Clements appointed her as judge of the 180th State Criminal District Court. Lykos served as a senior district judge, a special assignments judge, and as director of special projects for County Judge Robert Eckels, and director of judicial and legal issues for County Judge Ed Emmett.

Lykos was the former chief judge of the Harris County criminal district courts, served three terms as President of the Retired, Senior and Former Judges of Texas, and taught in programs for the Texas Center for the Judiciary, the American Bar Association, and the State Bar of Texas. She is a Fellow of the American Bar Foundation and the Houston Bar Foundation, of which she is a founding member. She has been an adjunct professor at South Texas College of Law, and taught at the National Judicial College on the campus of University of Nevada, Reno.

Lykos defeated Democrat Brad Bradford (former Houston police chief) in the general election on November 4, 2008.

In the April 8, 2008, Republican primary runoff, she defeated prosecutor Kelly Sieglar 52.6% to 47.3%. The Harris County District Attorney position became open after the former DA Chuck Rosenthal resigned in response to scandal.
