= Judge Cowen =

Judge Cowen or Cowan may refer to:

- Arnold Wilson Cowen (1905–2007), judge of the United States Court of Appeals for the Federal Circuit
- Finis E. Cowan (1929–2023), judge of the United States District Court for the Southern District of Texas
- Robert Cowen (born 1930), judge of the United States Court of Appeals for the Third Circuit
