= Claire McCaskill =

American politician (born 1953)

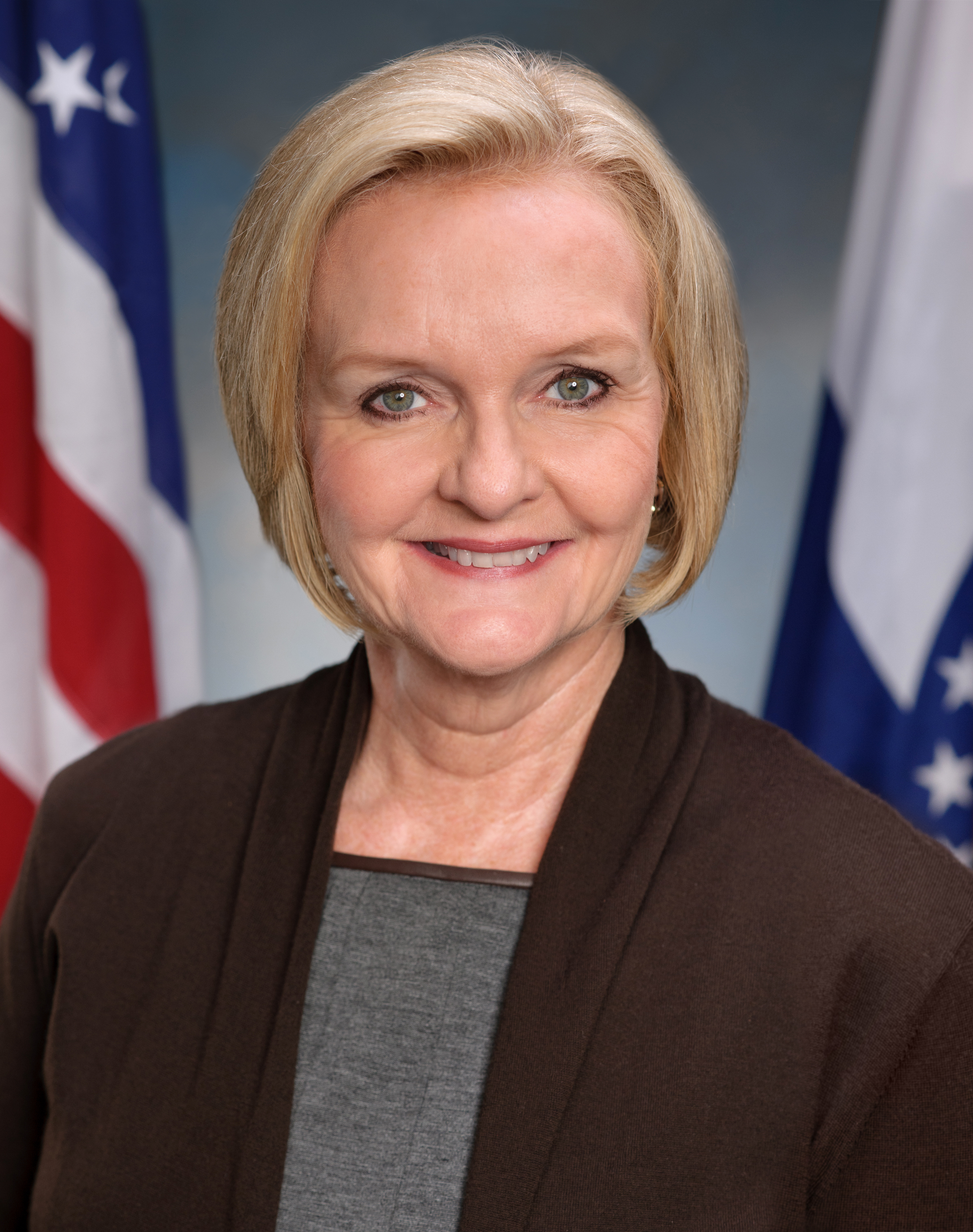
- Official portrait, 2011

Ranking Member of the Senate Homeland Security Committee
- In office January 3, 2017 – January 3, 2019
- Preceded by: Tom Carper
- Succeeded by: Gary Peters

United States Senator from Missouri
- In office January 3, 2007 – January 3, 2019
- Preceded by: Jim Talent
- Succeeded by: Josh Hawley

34th Auditor of Missouri
- In office January 3, 1999 – January 3, 2007
- Governor: Mel Carnahan; Roger Wilson; Bob Holden; Matt Blunt
- Preceded by: Margaret Kelly
- Succeeded by: Susan Montee

Prosecutor of Jackson County
- In office 1993–1998
- Preceded by: Albert Riederer
- Succeeded by: Robert Beaird

Member of the Missouri House of Representatives from the 42nd district
- In office January 5, 1983 – February 2, 1988
- Preceded by: James Barnes
- Succeeded by: Joseph Kenton

Personal details
- Born: Claire Conner McCaskill; July 24, 1953 (age 73) Rolla, Missouri, U.S.
- Party: Democratic
- Spouses: David Exposito (m. 1984; div. 1995); Joseph Shepard (m. 2002)
- Children: 3
- Education: University of Missouri (BA, JD)
- McCaskill's voice McCaskill supporting M. Douglas Harpool's confirmation as a district court judge. Recorded March 25, 2014

Claire Conner McCaskill (/məˈkæskəl/; born July 24, 1953) is an American politician and attorney who served as a United States senator from Missouri from 2007 to 2019. A member of the Democratic Party, she previously served as state auditor of Missouri from 1999 to 2007. McCaskill is the most recent Democrat to have represented Missouri in the U.S. Senate.

McCaskill is a native of Rolla, Missouri. She graduated from the University of Missouri and the University of Missouri School of Law. McCaskill served as a member of the Missouri House of Representatives from 1983 to 1989, as Jackson County Prosecutor from 1993 to 1998, and as the 34th State Auditor of Missouri from 1999 to 2007. She ran for governor of Missouri in the 2004 election, defeating Democratic incumbent Bob Holden in the Democratic primary and losing to Republican Matt Blunt in a close general election.

McCaskill was elected to the U.S. Senate in 2006, the first woman to be elected to the chamber from Missouri (Jean Carnahan was appointed upon the death of her husband). Re-elected in 2012, McCaskill was defeated in 2018 by Republican challenger Josh Hawley. Since February 2019, McCaskill has served as a political analyst for MSNBC and NBC. She is also the author of the memoir Plenty Ladylike (2015).

== Early life, education, and early law career ==
McCaskill was born in Rolla, Missouri. Her father, William Young McCaskill (1925–1993), served as a state insurance commissioner during the administration of Governor Warren E. Hearnes. Her mother, Betty Anne (née Ward; 1928–2012), was the first woman elected to the city council of Columbia, Missouri. Betty Anne McCaskill lost a race for a seat in the state House of Representatives to Leroy Blunt, the father of former U.S. senator Roy Blunt and grandfather of former Missouri governor Matt Blunt.

McCaskill spent her early childhood in the small Missouri town of Houston, later moving to Lebanon, and, eventually, Columbia. She attended David H. Hickman High School in Columbia, where she was a cheerleader, Pep Club president, a member of the debate club, a musical cast member, and homecoming queen. While attending the University of Missouri, McCaskill joined Kappa Alpha Theta sorority, graduating in 1975 with a B.A. in political science. She received her Juris Doctor (J.D.) from the University of Missouri School of Law in 1978. In the summer of 1974, before graduating from the University of Missouri, McCaskill studied at the Institute on Comparative Political and Economic Systems at Georgetown University.

From the time she graduated from law school in 1978 until her exit from the U.S. Senate in January 2019, McCaskill spent all but three years of her professional career in the public sector. The exception is the three years she spent in private practice as an attorney at a Kansas City law firm (1989 to 1991). Following her graduation from law school, she spent one year as a law clerk on the Missouri Court of Appeals for the Western District, which sits in Kansas City. Thereafter, McCaskill joined the Jackson County prosecutor's office, where she specialized in arson cases.

== Early political career ==
=== State legislature ===
In 1982, McCaskill was elected to represent the Brookside neighborhood of Kansas City in the Missouri House of Representatives. She left the State House and contemplated running for Jackson County Prosecutor in 1988, but did not pursue the position when her mentor, fellow Democrat and incumbent Prosecutor Albert Riederer decided to seek another term.

=== County politics ===
In 1990, McCaskill was elected to the Jackson County Legislature (the equivalent of a county commission or county council).

In February 1991, she testified in favor of a Missouri Senate bill that would prohibit a man accused of raping his wife from using marriage as a defense. "This is simply an issue of fundamental justice. It's embarrassing that we live in a state where it's okay to rape your wife", McCaskill said.

In December 1991, McCaskill announced her intention to run for county prosecutor. At the time of the announcement, Riederer had not announced whether he was going to seek reelection. McCaskill said that crime had "run amok" during Riederer's eleven years as county prosecutor. McCaskill won the Democratic primary, and she went on to win the 1992 general election with 53 percent of the vote. McCaskill was the first woman to serve as prosecutor for Jackson County. She was reelected in 1996 with 71 percent of the vote.

=== State auditor ===
Results of the 2002 Missouri Auditor General election

In 1998, McCaskill was elected as state auditor with 50.3 percent of the vote in the general election. She was the second female to hold the post, the first having been her immediate predecessor, Margaret B. Kelly.

When McCaskill ran for reelection in 2002, the winner of the Republican Party primary was Al Hanson, who had previously been incarcerated for fraud. Hanson said he was qualified to detect fraud because he had committed fraud himself. Due to Hanson's past record, the leader of the Missouri Republican Party urged voters to oppose Hanson in the general election. McCaskill was reelected with 60 percent of the vote.

=== 2004 gubernatorial campaign ===
McCaskill announced her intent to challenge incumbent governor Bob Holden in the Democratic primary on October 20, 2003.

On August 3, 2004, McCaskill defeated Holden, becoming the first candidate to defeat an incumbent governor in a primary election in state history. McCaskill carried much of the rural outstate, while also carrying areas whose voters had taken issues with Holden's actions, such as in Boone County home to the University of Missouri, which faced cuts under Holden.

On November 2, 2004, McCaskill lost to her Republican opponent, then-Secretary of State Matt Blunt in the general election by a margin of 51% to 48%. McCaskill's loss to Blunt was the first defeat in her twenty-year political career.

== U.S. Senate ==
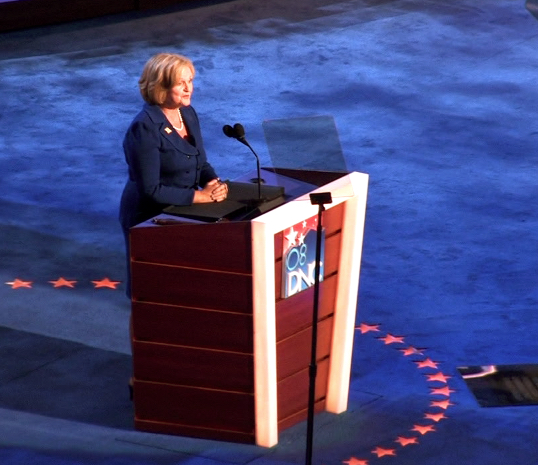
McCaskill speaks during the first night of the 2008 Democratic National Convention in Denver, Colorado.

=== Elections ===
==== 2006 ====
Both incumbent Jim Talent and McCaskill easily defeated their opponents in their respective primaries on August 8, 2006. McCaskill and Talent debated each other on Meet the Press on October 8, 2006. On November 8, 2006, McCaskill defeated Talent by a margin of 50% to 47% with two minor-party candidates taking the remainder.

==== 2012 ====
McCaskill ran unopposed in the Democratic primary and faced Republican nominee Todd Akin in the general election. Until mid-August, polling showed them running neck and neck. Then, in a television interview on August 12, Akin claimed that women who were the victims of what he described as "legitimate rape" rarely ended up pregnant. His comments caused controversy and he was criticized by members of both parties. He faced calls to withdraw from the race but did not do so, and McCaskill opened up an increasing lead in opinion polls. Akin's comments caused a backlash among voters, particularly women, and McCaskill was re-elected with 55% of the vote to his 39%. Libertarian candidate Jonathan Dine received 6%.

In August 2015, McCaskill penned a Politico article describing how she indirectly helped Akin—who she believed would make a weak general election candidate—win the Republican primary. Specifically, her campaign ran ads during primary season criticizing Akin as being too conservative; McCaskill did this to encourage conservatives (via reverse psychology) to vote for Akin. Washington Post contributor Jonathan Adler and others questioned whether McCaskill's indirect coordination with the Akin campaign constituted an unreported and in-kind contribution to Akin's campaign in violation of federal election law.

==== 2018 ====
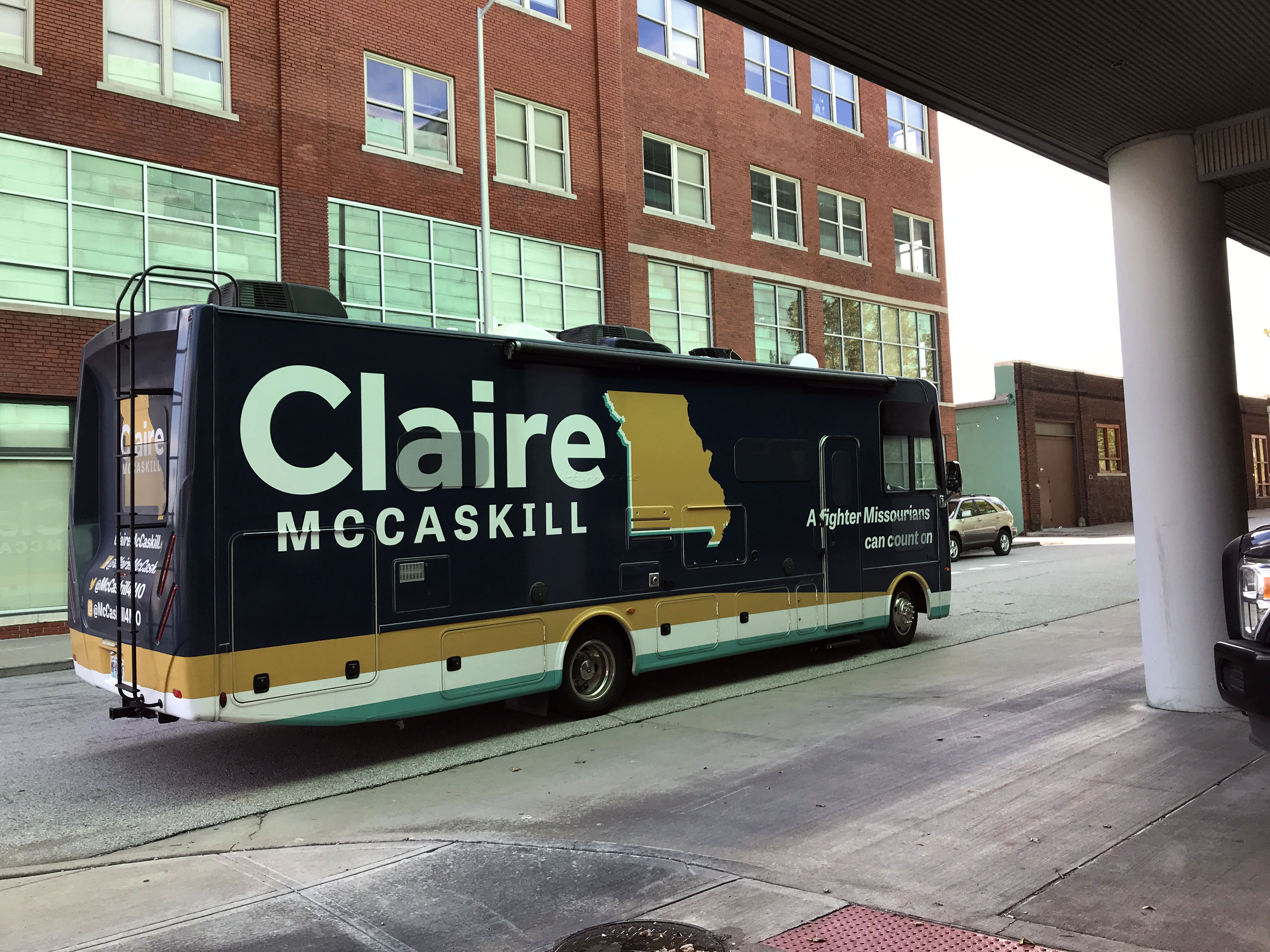
Campaign bus supporting McCaskill in 2018

McCaskill announced she was running for her third term. Six declared Democratic opponents and five Republicans, including Missouri attorney general Josh Hawley, were declared candidates for the GOP primary. On July 27, The Daily Beast reported that Microsoft had discovered that in September 2017, GRU "Fancy Bear" hackers had attempted spoofing hacks of her staff aides' email in an attempt to target her candidacy efforts, on behalf of the Russian state. Less than three weeks before the November general election, conservative group Project Veritas released secretly recorded video footage of statements by McCaskill and her campaign staff that appeared to differ from their public stances on several issues. In response, McCaskill said she had been "very upfront about all my positions", and called on Republican opponent and State Attorney General Hawley to launch an investigation into whether state laws were violated in the capturing and publishing of this footage. On election day, Hawley received 51% of the vote, to McCaskill's 46%. She has said that one of the reasons she lost was her party's lack of reach to rural Americans. McCaskill later said that the "spectacle" her fellow Democrats created during the confirmation hearings of Brett Kavanaugh's nomination to the U.S. Supreme Court also played a factor in her defeat.

=== Tenure ===
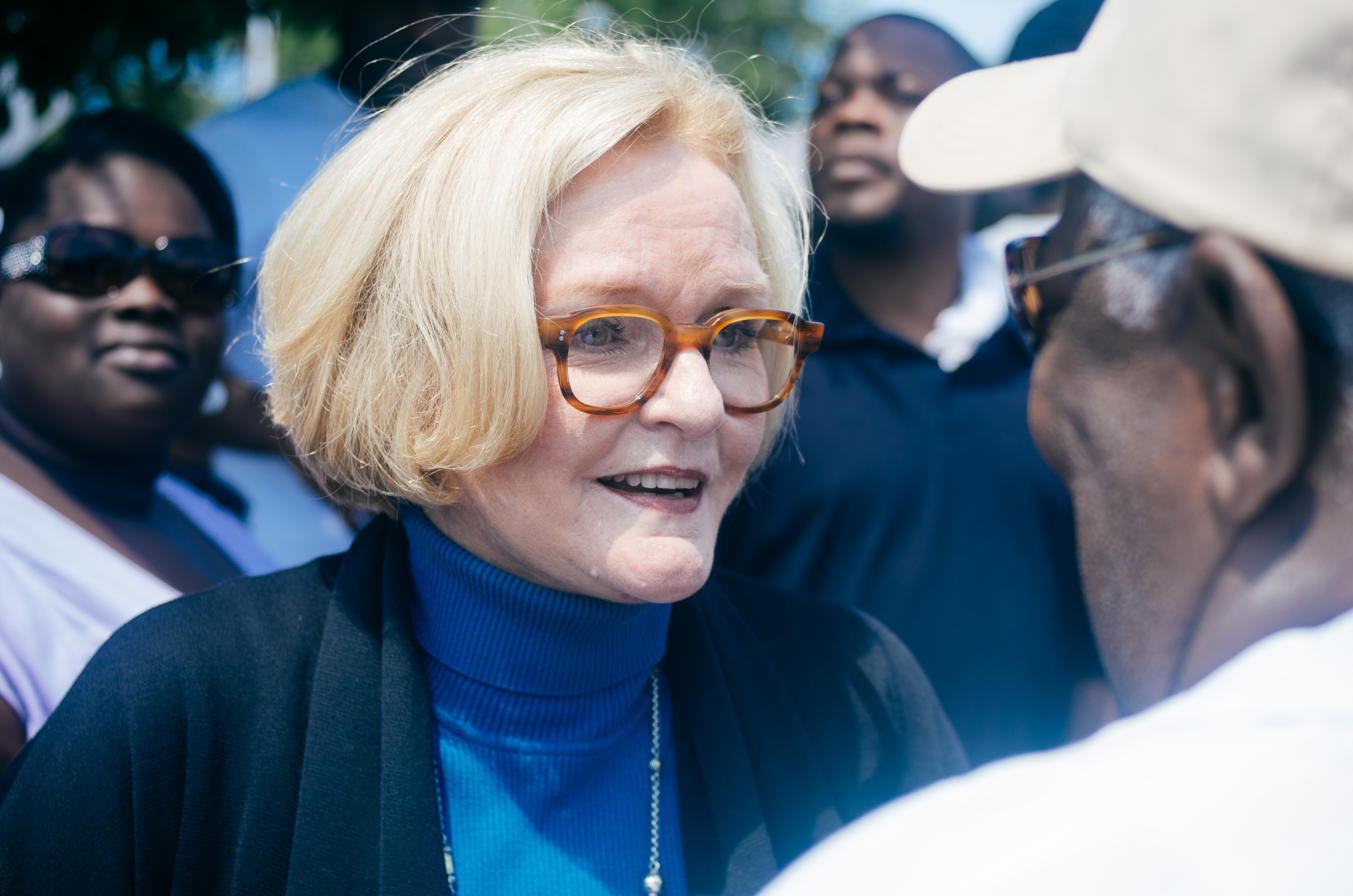
McCaskill visiting protesters during the Ferguson unrest

McCaskill was the first elected woman to represent Missouri in the U.S. Senate. Jean Carnahan was appointed to the Senate following her husband's death and posthumous election, but was defeated in a close election by Jim Talent. In 2006, McCaskill defeated Talent for a full term. In 2011, she became Missouri's senior senator when Roy Blunt took office as the junior Senator.

==== Political positions ====
Through 2012, McCaskill was named by the National Journal as one of the ten most "moderate" senators. In 2011, she was ranked 50th on its scale of the 100 senators, from most liberal to most conservative. In 2013, the National Journal rated McCaskill's voting record as 53% liberal and 47% conservative. The Washington Post reported in 2012 that she was the second-most-likely Democratic senator to vote against her party. The conservative Americans for Prosperity gave her a 30% score for being in line with their positions in 2016. The progressive Americans for Democratic Action gave her a 65% liberal quotient in 2015. As of 2018, FiveThirtyEight, which tracks congressional votes, found that McCaskill voted with President Donald Trump's position 45% of the time.

==== 2008 presidential election ====
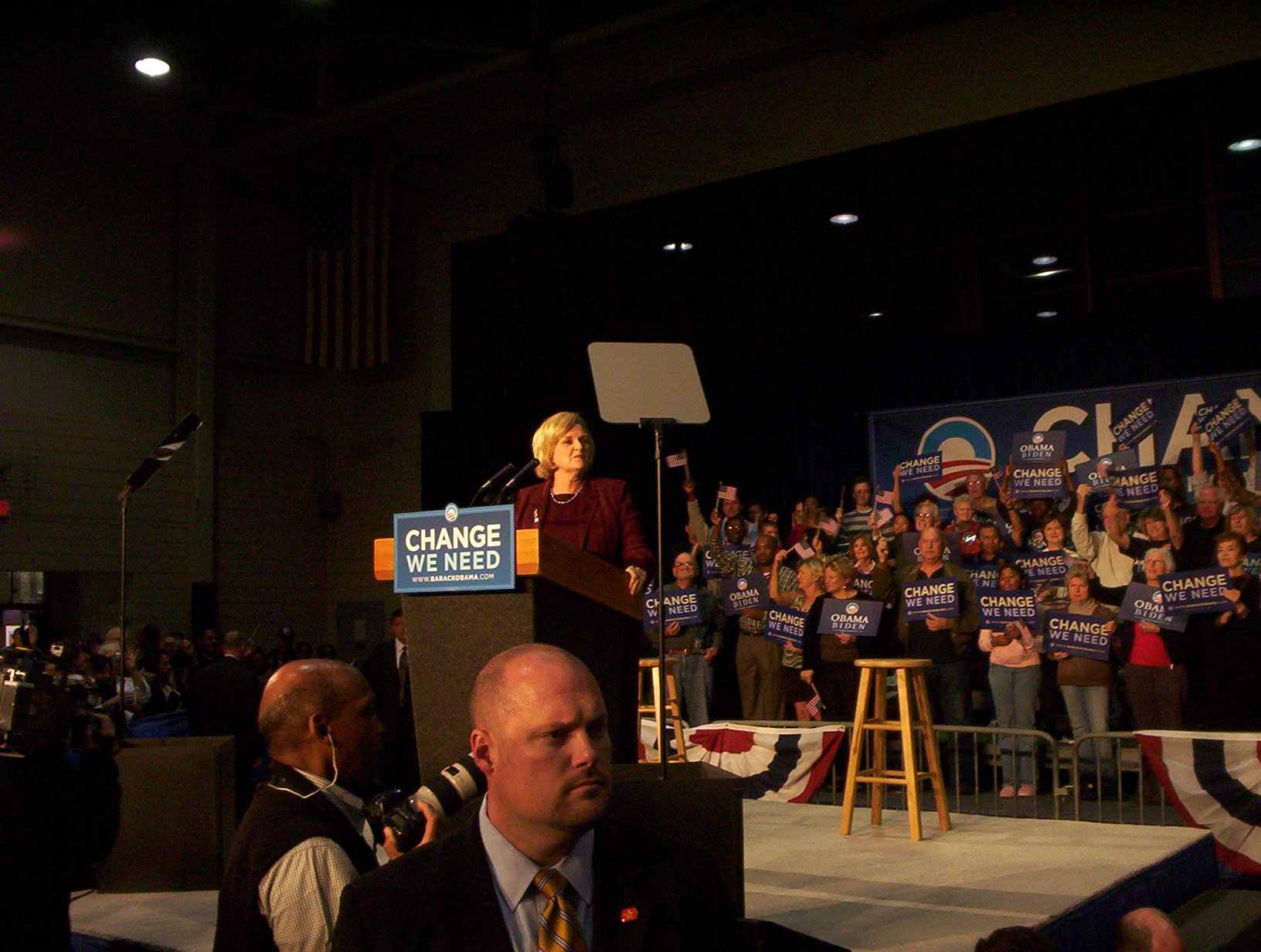
McCaskill campaigning for Obama in 2008

In January 2008, McCaskill endorsed then-Senator Barack Obama in his campaign for the Democratic nomination for president, making her one of the first Senators to do so. She was one of the most visible faces for his campaign, and her support was crucial to Obama's narrow victory in the Missouri primary in February 2008. She has credited her daughter Maddie as having persuaded her to publicly endorse Obama. She was frequently mentioned as a possible vice-presidential nominee for Obama, but was never seriously considered. She spoke on the opening day of the Democratic National Convention in August 2008.

==== 2016 presidential election ====
In 2013, McCaskill announced that she would be supporting Hillary Clinton in the 2016 presidential election. During the primaries, McCaskill was among Clinton's top surrogates. She described Bernie Sanders as "too liberal" and "extreme" and saying that the enthusiasm of his supporters was no more impressive than that of Ron Paul's supporters in 2012. On March 21, after Clinton's sweep of Southern primaries, McCaskill called for Sanders to throw his support to Clinton.

==== Economic issues ====
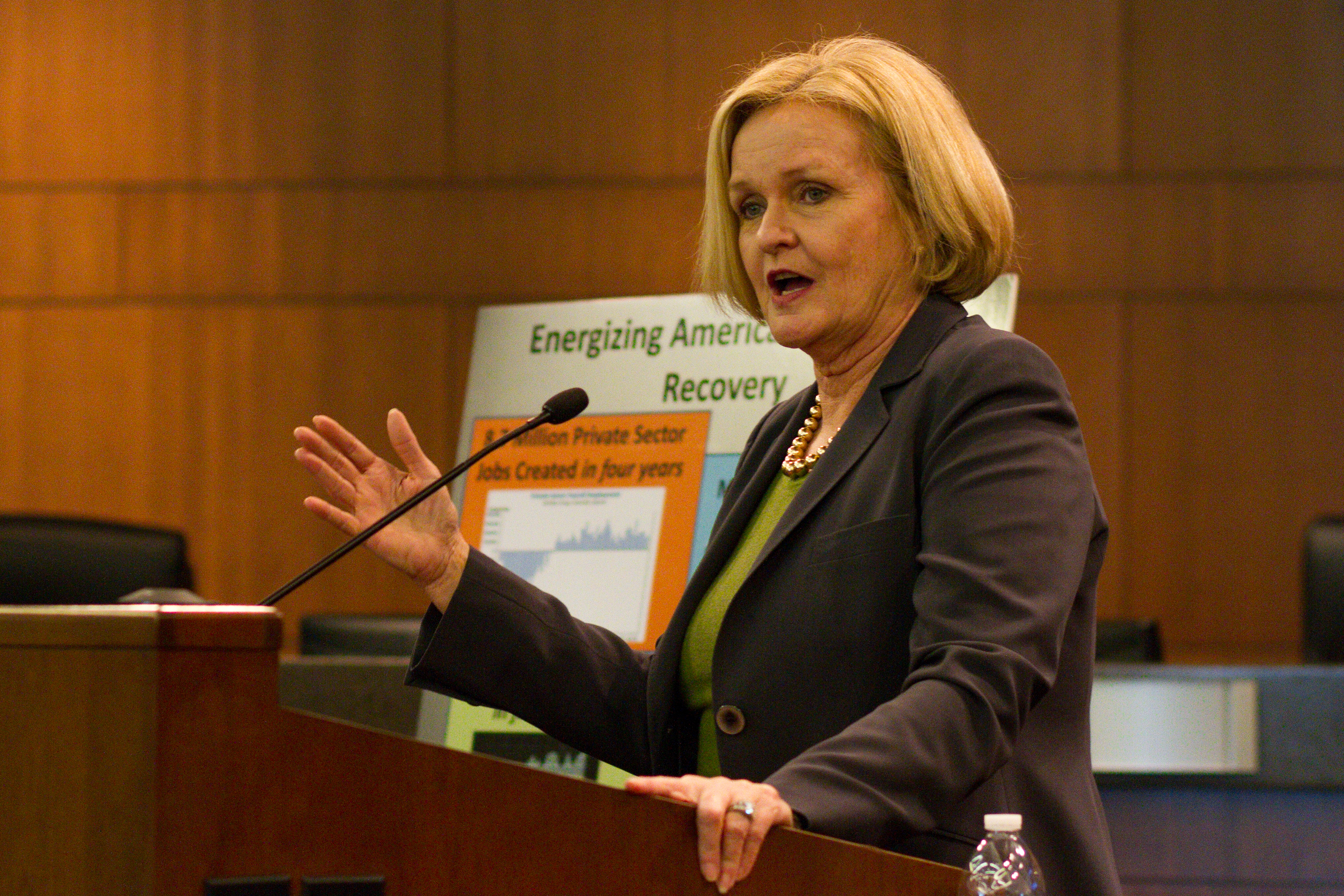
McCaskill speaks in Columbia, Missouri, in March 2014.

In 2013, the National Journal gave her a 46% score on "Liberal on Economic Policy" and a 53% score on "Conservative on Economic Policy". In 2016, FreedomWorks and the Club for Growth, both of which support lower taxes, gave her ratings of 10% and 15%, respectively.

In November 2017, President Trump visited Missouri to promote his tax bill and said that if McCaskill didn't support his tax plan, she should be voted out of office. She said that she could support a tax bill put together "in a bipartisan way" and that she would support "doubling the standard deduction", "enhancing the child tax credit", and even "some corporate tax relief as long as we were cleaning up some of the loopholes that allow so many corporations to avoid paying their fair share." But she did not support Trump's tax bill, which in Missouri, she said, would mainly help rich St. Louis suburbanites.

Ahead of an August 7, 2018, Missouri vote on Proposition A on adopting a right-to-work law in Missouri, McCaskill endorsed a "no" vote on the proposition.

==== Immigration ====
In 2010, McCaskill voted for the DREAM Act, which would have given undocumented immigrants who entered the United States as children a pathway to citizenship provided that they fulfilled certain conditions.

In January 2018, McCaskill and three other Democratic senators were cosponsors of the Border and Port Security Act, legislation that would mandate that US Customs and Border Protection "hire, train and assign at least 500 officers per year until the number of needed positions the model identifies is filled" in addition to requiring the commissioner of Customs and Border Protection to determine potential equipment and infrastructure improvements that could be used for ports of entry.

McCaskill has said that "protecting the DREAMers has to be a very top priority." McCaskill opposed the Trump administration's policy of separating immigrant families who illegally crossed the border, and supported legislation to end the family separation policy.

==== Government spending ====
McCaskill co-sponsored the Saving Federal Dollars Through Better Use of Government Purchase and Travel Cards Act, which sought to improve the processes related to the use of credit cards by government employees.

==== Armed services ====
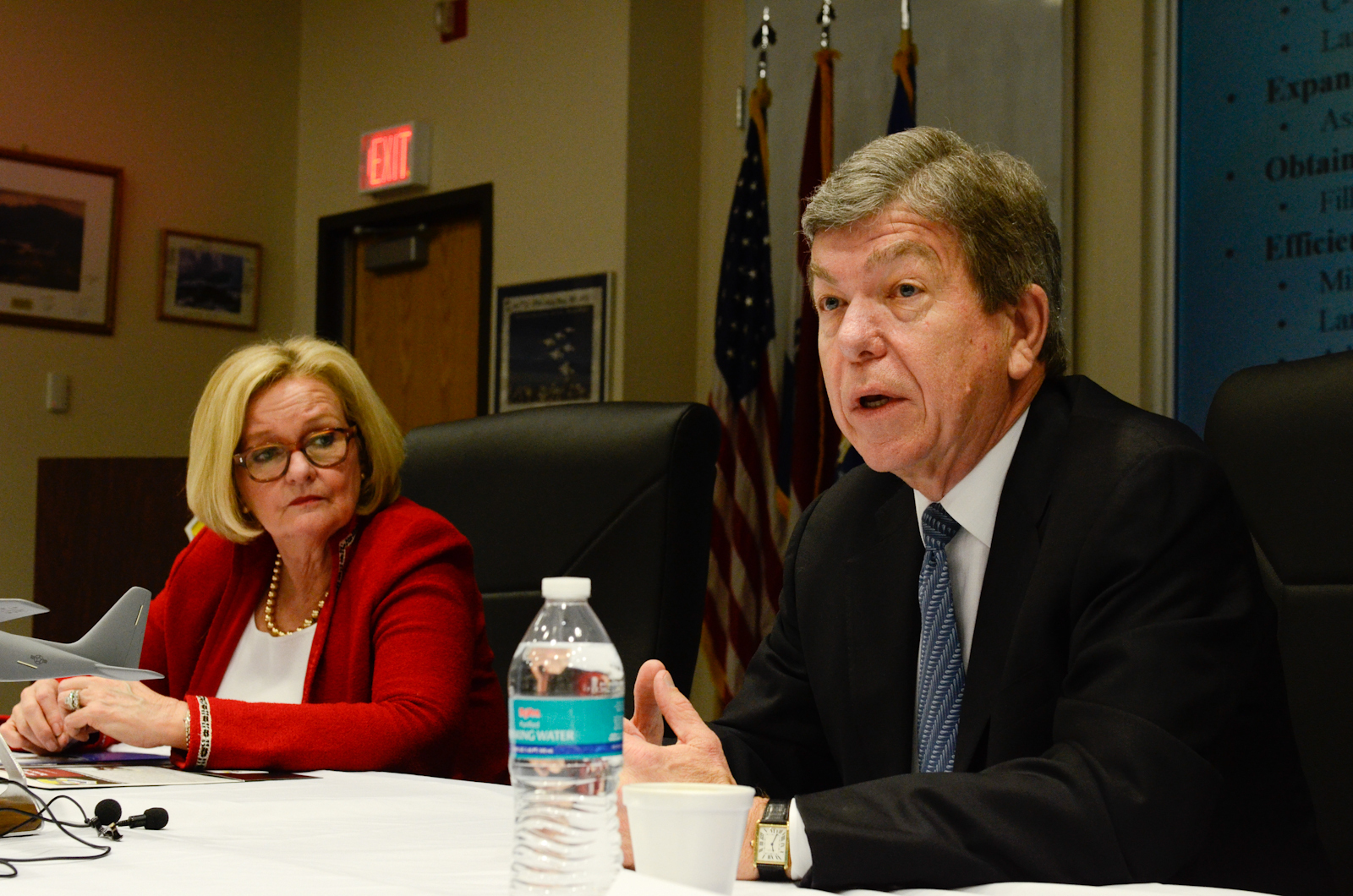
McCaskill and Senator Roy Blunt speaking at Rosecrans Air National Guard Base in 2014

As a member of the Senate Armed Services Committee, McCaskill called for nuclear weapons modernization. In June 2017, she voted to support Trump's $350 billion arms deal with Saudi Arabia.

On January 14, 2014, she introduced the Victims Protection Act of 2014 (S. 1917; 113th Congress), which sought to help victims of sexual assault in the military. This bill was a watered down version of a similar sexual assault bill previously introduced by Senator Kirsten Gillibrand. The latter proposal would have streamlined the prosecution process by removing it from the military chain of command. McCaskills' bill allowed victims to give a preference as to whether they would prefer their cases to be tried in the military or in the civilian justice system. The bill passed the Senate on March 10, 2014, by a vote of 97–0.

==== Disaster recovery ====
As a member of the Senate ad hoc subcommittee on disaster recovery, McCaskill criticized the Federal Emergency Management Agency's handling of Hurricane Katrina recovery efforts.

==== Health care ====
In 2017, the Planned Parenthood Action Fund gave McCaskill a 100% lifetime rating for her positions on health care. In 2016, the American Public Health Association also gave her a 100% rating for the positions she had taken on health-care issues during the previous year.

McCaskill voted for the Patient Protection and Affordable Care Act, popularly known as ObamaCare, in December 2009.

In April 2017, McCaskill expressed her opposition to a single-payer healthcare system, saying it is too expensive and not realistic.

In August 2017, McCaskill introduced the Health Care Options for All Act, whereby people living in counties with no health-care exchanges "would be able to buy coverage through the D.C. small business exchange, called SHOP", with the U.S. government "contribut[ing] toward the cost of premiums if they meet a certain income threshold." Criticizing Trump's health-care bill in September 2017, she called it "a bait-and-switch, in which they're trying to buy off certain states with promises of more money now, but with no guarantee that healthcare dollars in our state won't ultimately go down." She added that the bill would not help "folks in Missouri who've been sick before and have a pre-existing condition, and older Missourians."

At each event during her 2018 re-election bid campaign, McCaskill asked attendees with preexisting conditions to stand up, and vowed to keep in place health insurance protections for such individuals.

==== Gun law ====
McCaskill received an "F" rating from the NRA Political Victory Fund (NRA-PVF) for not supporting their view of Second Amendment rights and opposing all right-to-carry legislation.

She voted for expanded background checks and co-sponsored the "Feinstein Amendment," a proposal that would have made it illegal for individuals on the terror watchlist to purchase guns. In January 2016, McCaskill was one of eighteen senators to sign a letter to Thad Cochran and Barbara Mikulski requesting that the Labor, Health and Education subcommittee hold a hearing on whether to allow the Centers for Disease Control and Prevention (CDC) to fund a study of gun violence and "the annual appropriations rider that some have interpreted as preventing it" with taxpayer dollars. The senators noted their support for taking steps "to fund gun-violence research, because only the United States government is in a position to establish an integrated public-health research agenda to understand the causes of gun violence and identify the most effective strategies for prevention." In June 2016, McCaskill participated in the Chris Murphy gun control filibuster and in a sit-in on the House floor urging votes for gun control.

In response to the 2017 Las Vegas shooting, McCaskill co-sponsored a bill to ban bump stocks.

==== Terrorism ====
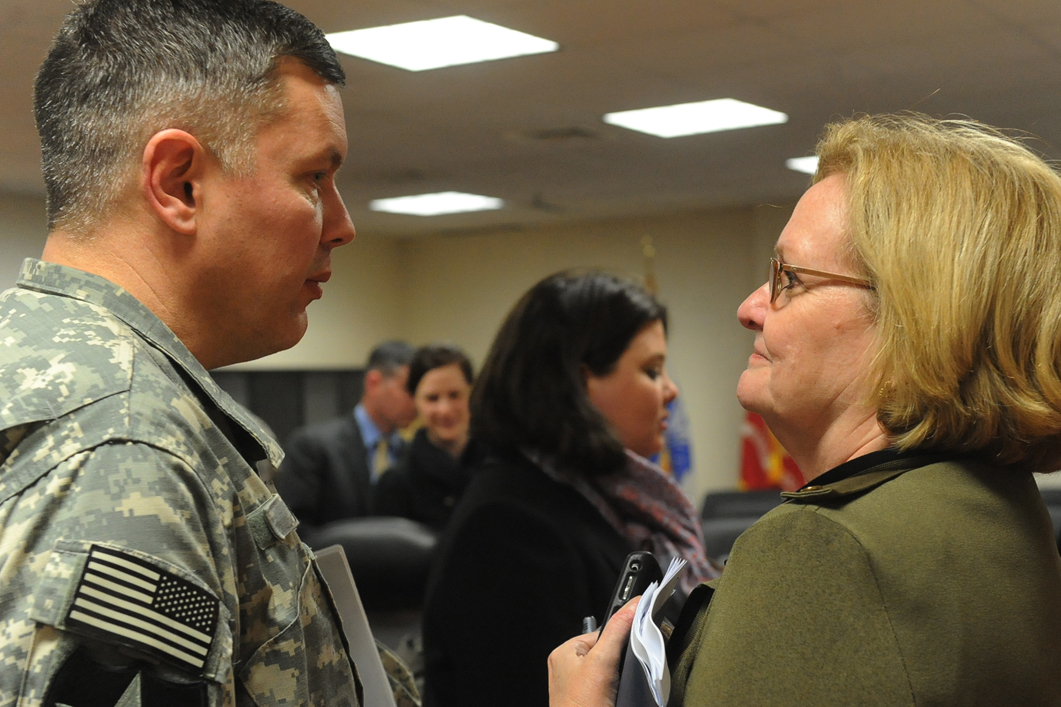
McCaskill at Camp Eggers, Afghanistan in 2010

During a 2013 congressional hearing, McCaskill asked Homeland Security Secretary Janet Napolitano: "Based on the evidence at this point, is there any difference between Sandy Hook and Boston other than the choice of weapon?" McCaskill then urged Napolitano "to reevaluate when and how the federal government defines a criminal act as terrorism".

==== #MeToo ====
In October 2017, in the midst of a flurry of news reports about sexual assaults by politicians and other celebrities, McCaskill said on Meet the Press that while serving in the state legislature, she had asked the House Speaker, Bob F. Griffin, to discuss a bill she was sponsoring. "And I explained to him the bill I had, and did he have any advice for me on how I could get it out of committee?" McCaskill said. "And he looked at me, and he paused, and he said, 'Well, did you bring your knee pads?'"

==== Comments on men ====
In November 2015, in a video for The Late Show with Stephen Colbert, McCaskill encouraged men to "sometimes just shut the hell up." McCaskill added, "It's not that women don't value your thoughts, it's just that we don't value all of them." She then set forth a variety of topics about which "women no longer need to hear men's opinions." Regarding the topic of "what women do with their bodies", McCaskill advised men to "hush". McCaskill described the video as a joke.

==== LGBT rights ====
On March 24, 2013, McCaskill posted to Tumblr in support of same-sex marriage: "While churches should never be required to conduct marriages outside of their religious beliefs, neither should the government tell people who they have a right to marry."

On a November 4, 2020, MSNBC broadcast, McCaskill said that by supporting issues like abortion, same-sex marriage, and the rights of transgender people, whom McCaskill referred to as "transsexuals", Democrats "left voters behind and Republicans dove in." McCaskill apologized for using the word transsexuals, which she called a "hurtful term", the next day in a tweet, saying she was "tired" but admitting that is "never a good excuse". She further said that "our party should never leave behind our fight for equality for trans people or anyone else who has been marginalized by hate", adding that "my record reflects that."

==== Net neutrality ====
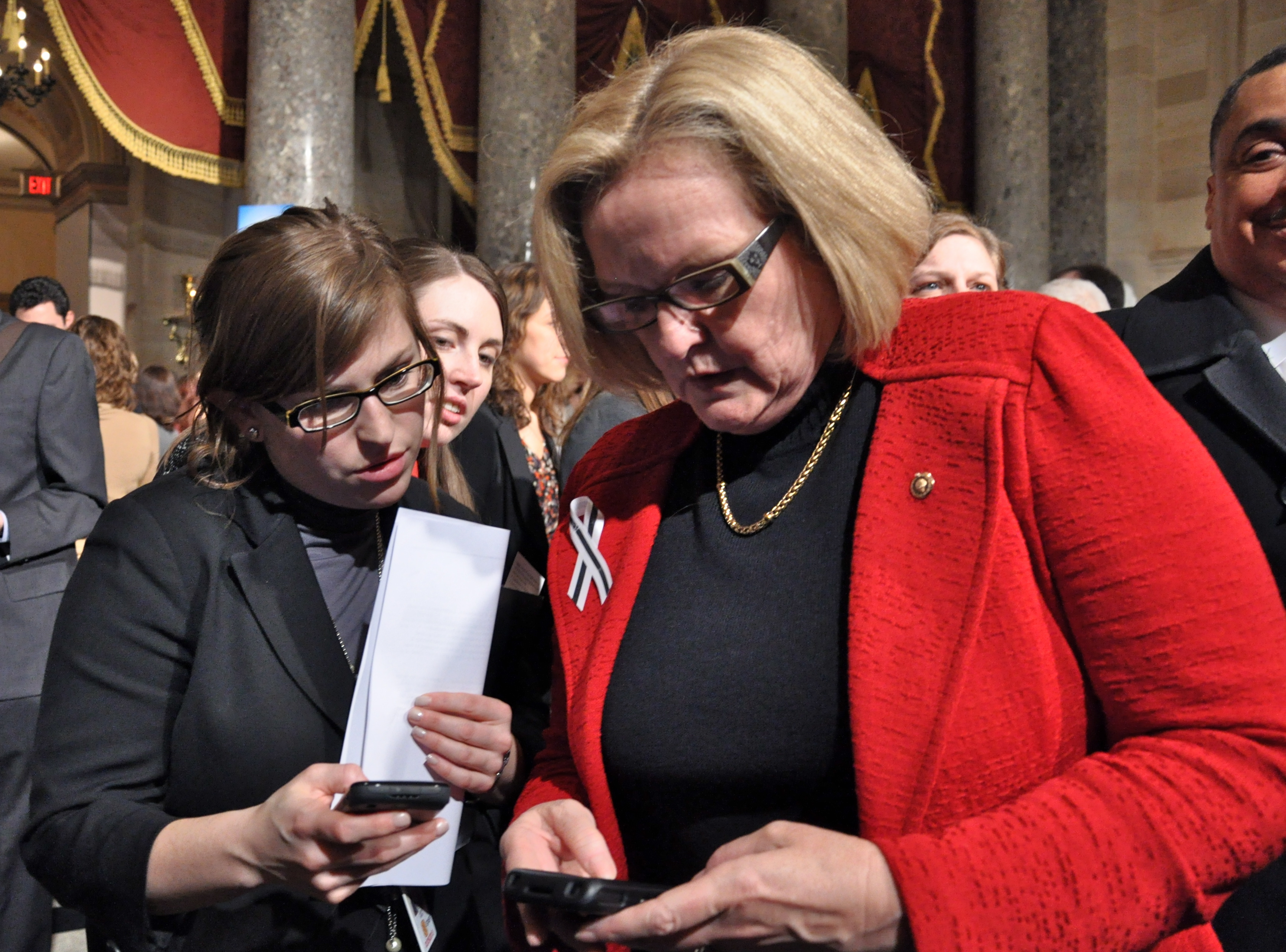
McCaskill and a congressional aide on their cellphones

In January 2018, McCaskill announced her support for a Senate bill intended to reverse the Federal Communications Commission's repeal of net neutrality; as she was the 30th Senator to support the bill, it was ensured that the bill would reach the floor of the Senate. In October 2017, McCaskill was one of four Democrats who voted to confirm FCC Commissioner Ajit Pai, who announced the plan to reverse net neutrality rules earlier that year. In explaining her vote, McCaskill said that she disagreed with Pai on net neutrality but voted for Pai because "the president has a right to the chairman because he won the election". According to Ars Technica, "it's common for [FCC] commissioners to get broad bi-partisan support in the Senate even if their policies are opposed by one of the two major parties."

==== Trade ====
McCaskill opposed Trump's trade tariffs, saying they were "hurting Missouri farmers and manufacturing."

==== Israel Anti-Boycott Act ====
In June 2017, McCaskill co-sponsored the Israel Anti-Boycott Act, Senate Bill 720, which would have made it a federal crime, punishable by a maximum sentence of 20 years imprisonment, for Americans to encourage or participate in internationally sponsored boycotts against Israel and Israeli settlements in the occupied Palestinian territories if protesting actions by the Israeli government.

==== Voting rights ====
In July 2018, McCaskill introduced legislation that would make it illegal to knowingly and intentionally spread false information about an election, such as false information about the time and place of voting, voter qualifications and registration status. She said, "Misinformation campaigns intended only to suppress the vote and disenfranchise Missourians are crimes that run counter to our democratic values."

=== Committee assignments ===
- Committee on Armed Services
  - Subcommittee on Airland
  - Subcommittee on Cybersecurity
  - Subcommittee on Personnel
- United States Senate Committee on Finance
  - United States Senate Finance Subcommittee on International Trade, Customs, and Global Competitiveness
  - United States Senate Finance Subcommittee on Taxation and IRS Oversight
- Committee on Homeland Security and Governmental Affairs (Ranking Member)
  - Subcommittee on Federal Financial Management, Government Information and International Security
  - Permanent Subcommittee on Investigations (Ranking Member)
  - Ad Hoc Subcommittee on State, Local, and Private Sector Preparedness and Integration

McCaskill also served as the Chairwoman of the Select Committee for the Impeachment of Samuel B. Kent, which was disbanded July 22, 2009, after Judge Kent resigned, and the United States Senate Homeland Security Ad Hoc Subcommittee on Contracting Oversight, which was disbanded in 2013.

== Controversies ==
=== Private airplane ===
On March 16, 2011, McCaskill told reporters that she was "embarrassed" about revelations that her office had used taxpayer money for the senator's use of a private airplane she co-owned with her husband and friends. According to a government audit, the plane was used for 90 flights taken between Washington, D.C., and her home in suburban St. Louis, as well as to numerous sites around the state of Missouri. According to McCaskill's Senate office, all but 1 of the 90 flights in question were within Senate rules. As soon as the story broke, McCaskill sent a check for $88,000 to the U.S. Treasury as reimbursement for the flights.

The Missouri Republican Party filed a formal complaint with the Senate Ethics Committee on March 16. In response McCaskill said, "The Missouri Republican Party is going to try to ride this horse as long as they can. They're going to try to make this as big a deal as they can. Them filing the ethics complaint is about as surprising as the sun coming up." On March 21, 2011, Politico reported that McCaskill and her husband had failed to pay more than $280,000 in property taxes on the plane and were planning to sell it. "I have convinced my husband to sell the damn plane", McCaskill said on a conference call with reporters. "I will never set foot on the plane again". The Ethics Committee dismissed the Missouri GOP's complaint.

The plane, a 2001 Pilatus PC-12, was sold in October 2011. It was stored at Spirit of St. Louis Airport, McCaskill confirmed, and owned by Timesaver LLC, a Delaware-based limited liability company. McCaskill noted that she had paid $38,800 in sales taxes on the plane, and she had only recently (as of March 2011) become aware that Missouri also imposed a property tax on private aircraft. She said she was "disappointed" in herself for not ensuring that Timesaver LLC paid the property taxes. "Frankly, having the plane owned in Delaware would not negate the necessity of paying the personal property tax in Missouri", she said. "This is a mistake. It should have been reported in Missouri. It was owed in Missouri. It will be paid in Missouri today".

=== Meetings with Russian government officials ===
On March 2, 2017, McCaskill tweeted that she had had "No call or meeting w/Russian ambassador. Ever". After her own tweets of January 20, 2013 ("Off to meeting w/Russian Ambassador.") and August 6, 2015 ("Today calls with British, Russian, and German Ambassadors") were exposed, McCaskill recanted her tweet of March 2, blaming Twitter's character limit. McCaskill had been a leading critic of Attorney General Jeff Sessions's meetings with Russian government officials in his capacity as United States senator and had called for Sessions's resignation on this account. McCaskill also said that the nature of her meetings with the Russian ambassador were different to his. PolitiFact rated McCaskill's assertion false, and also noted "though the context for McCaskill's and Sessions' interactions with Kislyak may be very different, she goes too far in saying she didn't 'ever' have that meeting or phone call."

=== Pressuring Army officials to punish soldiers cleared of crimes ===
In a February 4, 2014, contracting oversight hearing with Army officials, McCaskill was on record pressuring officials to bring punishment on up to 1,900 servicemembers by inappropriately adding them to Defense Department and FBI databases. As part of the botched investigation into the Guard Recruiter Assistance Program (G-RAP), false arrest records were added into federal databases after individuals were cleared of charges. This resulted in wide-ranging consequences for affected soldiers. Guardsmen who worked as police officers outside the Guard lost their jobs, concealed weapons permits were revoked, and promotions were inappropriately denied.

=== Joseph Shephard business ties ===
Claire McCaskill married successful businessmen Joseph Shephard in 2002, and because of his success, became one of the wealthiest members of Congress at the time. Her Republican opponents made Joseph Shephard's business ties an issue during several campaigns, including McCaskill's governor campaign in 2004, and her Senate races in 2012 and 2018.

Shephard also owned various affordable housing businesses that received almost 40 million dollars from the US Departments of Agriculture and Housing and Urban Development, from 2007 when McCaskill was elected, to 2011. McCaskill had voted for several bills that funded the federal housing and agricultural departments, which provide subsidies to businesses with federal contracts to provide low-income housing. Shephard reportedly made between 400,000 and 2.6 million from these businesses that received money.

Claire McCaskill and husband Joseph Shephard had ties to businessmen Rick DeStafane, who owned and was president of Reliant Care Group. Joseph Shephard was CEO of Reliant Health Care Group and founded Reliant Care Group in 1989. He sold the businesses in 2011. The nursing homes these facilities ran received several complaints, including reports of several elderly patients falling out of windows, according to an investigation by the Kansas City Star. Reliant Care Group was also accused of committing Medicare fraud by knowingly submitting false claims. The US government reached an over 8 million dollar settlement with them.

== Electoral history ==
=== State Auditor ===
She was elected Missouri State Auditor in the 1998 Missouri State Auditor election and re-elected in the 2002 Missouri State Auditor election.

Missouri State Auditor Democratic Primary, 1998
Party	Candidate	Votes	%	±%
Democratic	Claire McCaskill	151,595	51.0%	
Democratic	Stephen J. Conway	114,997	38.7%	−12.3
Democratic	Timothy Marshall Walters	30,888	10.4%	−40.6

Missouri State Auditor election, 1998
Party	Candidate	Votes	%	±%
Democratic	Claire McCaskill	780,178	50.3%	
Republican	Charles (Chuck) A. Pierce	719,653	46.4%	−3.9%
Libertarian	Gerald R. Geier	26,955	1.7%	−48.6
Reform	George D. Weber	24,188	1.6%	−48.7

Missouri State Auditor election, 2002
Party	Candidate	Votes	%	±%
Democratic	Claire McCaskill (incumbent)	1,090,593	60.0%	
Republican	Al Hanson	664,982	36.6%	−23.4
Libertarian	Arnold J. Trembley	39,891	2.2%	−57.8
Green	Fred Kennell	23,521	1.3%	−58.7
American Independent	Theo (Ted) Brown, Sr.	54	0.0%	−60

=== Governor ===
Missouri gubernatorial Democratic primary election, 2004
Party	Candidate	Votes	%
Democratic	Claire McCaskill	437,780	51.64
Democratic	Bob Holden (incumbent)	383,734	45.27
Democratic	Jim LePage	16,761	1.98
Democratic	Jeffery A. Emrick	9,473	1.12
Total votes		847,748	100.00

=== Results ===
Missouri gubernatorial election, 2004
Party	Candidate	Votes	%	±%
Republican	Matt Blunt	1,382,419	50.83%	+2.63%
Democratic	Claire McCaskill	1,301,442	47.85%	−1.27%
Libertarian	John Swenson	24,378	0.90%	+0.42%
Constitution	Robert Wells	11,299	0.42%	+0.28%
Majority		80,977	2.98%	+2.06%
Turnout		2,719,538	64.8	+4.0
Republican gain from Democratic		Swing		

=== U.S. Senator ===
Missouri United States Senate Democratic primary election, 2006
Party	Candidate	Votes	%	±%
Democratic	Claire McCaskill	282,767	80.8	
Democratic	Bill Clinton Young	67,173	19.2	−61.6

2006 United States Senate election in Missouri
Party	Candidate	Votes	%	±%
Democratic	Claire McCaskill	1,055,255	49.6	+0.9
Republican	Jim Talent (incumbent)	1,006,941	47.3	−2.5
Libertarian	Frank Gilmour	47,792	2.2	+1.2
Progressive Party	Lydia Lewis	18,383	0.9	n/a
Write-in		88	0.0	n/a
Total votes		2,128,459	100.0	n/a
Democratic gain from Republican				

United States Senate election in Missouri, 2012
Party	Candidate	Votes	%	±%
Democratic	Claire McCaskill (incumbent)	1,494,125	54.81%	+5.36%
Republican	Todd Akin	1,066,159	39.11%	−8.20%
Libertarian	Jonathan Dine	165,468	6.07%	+3.83%
Write-in		41	0.01%	+0.01%
Total votes		2,725,793	100.00%	N/A
Democratic hold				

United States Senate election in Missouri, 2018
Party	Candidate	Votes	%	±%
Republican	Josh Hawley	1,254,927	51.38%	+12.27
Democratic	Claire McCaskill (incumbent)	1,112,935	45.57%	−9.24
Independent	Craig O'Dear	34,398	1.41%	N/A
Libertarian	Japheth Campbell	27,316	1.12%	−4.95
Green	Jo Crain	12,706	0.52%	N/A
Write-in		7	<0.01%	N/A
Total votes		2,442,289	100.00%	N/A
Republican gain from Democratic				

== Career after public office ==
On January 15, 2019, McCaskill joined NBC News and MSNBC as a political analyst. McCaskill is featured as a regular guest on Deadline: White House and Morning Joe. She also makes frequent appearances on The Last Word with Lawrence O'Donnell and The 11th Hour with Brian Williams along with, MSNBC and NBC News Special Event Breaking News Coverage.

In May 2021, McCaskill was reportedly being considered for an ambassadorship in Europe under the Joe Biden administration.

In October 2022, McCaskill joined the Council for Responsible Social Media project launched by Issue One to address the negative mental, civic, and public health impacts of social media in the United States co-chaired by former House Democratic Caucus leader Dick Gephardt and former Massachusetts lieutenant governor Kerry Healey.

== Personal life ==
McCaskill was married to David Exposito, with whom she had three children. The couple divorced in 1995, after 11 years of marriage, while McCaskill was Jackson County Prosecutor. David Exposito was found murdered in Kansas City, Kansas, on December 12, 2005. Exposito's murder has never been solved.

McCaskill married Joseph Shepard in 2002.

On the October 3, 2009, episode of Wait Wait... Don't Tell Me! on National Public Radio, McCaskill spoke about a vacation early in her career as a lawyer, when she was a contestant on High Rollers. McCaskill reigned as champion for four days and later sold several of her prizes to pay off her student loan debt.

McCaskill's mother, Betty Anne McCaskill, died on October 29, 2012, from natural causes at the age of 84. A convert to Roman Catholicism, McCaskill was denied communion for her pro-choice stance on abortion by then-Bishop Raymond Burke, later Cardinal Raymond Burke.

McCaskill maintains residences in Washington, D.C., and Kirkwood, a suburb of St. Louis. She joined Sheryl Sandberg's movement to encourage young women to be more assertive in professional interactions. On February 22, 2016, McCaskill announced that she had been diagnosed with breast cancer. She stated through Tumblr, "It's a little scary, but my prognosis is good and I expect a full recovery."

== Honors ==
=== Scholastic ===
University degrees

Location	Date	School	Degree
Missouri	1975	University of Missouri	Bachelor of Arts (BA) in Political science
Missouri	1978	University of Missouri School of Law	Juris Doctor (JD)

Chancellor, visitor, governor, rector and fellowships

Location	Date	School	Position
Illinois	2019 – present	University of Chicago Institute of Politics	Fellow

=== Honorary degrees ===
Location	Date	School	Degree	Gave commencement address
Missouri	2009	William Woods University	Doctorate	Yes

=== Memberships and non-scholastic fellowships ===
Location	Date	Organization	Position
Missouri	1978 – present	The Missouri Bar	Member

== Awards ==
Location	Date	Institution	Award
Missouri	21 April 2009	University of Missouri	Outstanding Alumni Service Award for service to the University of Missouri System
Missouri	6 April 2019	Missouri Military Academy	General Clifton B. Cates "I Will Hold" Award
Missouri	13 October 2020	National Council of Jewish Women (St. Louis Chapter)	Hannah G. Solomon Founder's Award
Missouri	2 December 2020	City of Independence Missouri	Harry S. Truman Public Service Award

== See also ==
- Barack Obama Supreme Court candidates
- Women in the United States Senate

Party political offices
Preceded by Steve Danner	Democratic nominee for Auditor of Missouri; 1998, 2002	Succeeded by Susan Montee
Preceded by Bob Holden	Democratic nominee for Governor of Missouri; 2004	Succeeded by Jay Nixon
Preceded by Jean Carnahan	Democratic nominee for U.S. Senator from Missouri (Class 1); 2006, 2012, 2018	Succeeded by Lucas Kunce
Political offices
Preceded by Margret Kelly	Auditor of Missouri; 1999–2007	Succeeded by Susan Montee
U.S. Senate
Preceded by Jim Talent	U.S. Senator (Class 1) from Missouri; 2007–2019; Served alongside: Kit Bond, Roy Blunt	Succeeded by Josh Hawley
Preceded by Susan Collins	Ranking Member of the Senate Aging Committee; 2015–2017	Succeeded by Bob Casey
Preceded by Tom Carper	Ranking Member of the Senate Homeland Security Committee; 2017–2019	Succeeded by Gary Peters
U.S. order of precedence (ceremonial)
Preceded by Evan Bayh as Former U.S. Senator	Order of precedence of the United States as Former U.S. Senator	Succeeded by Roy Blunt as Former U.S. Senator
