= Marina García =

Marina García may refer to:

- Marina García Urzainqui (born 1994), Spanish swimmer
- Marina García Polo (born 2004), Spanish synchronised swimmer
- Marina Garcia Marmolejo, United States district judge
