= Samuel B. Kent =

American judge (born 1949)

Samuel Kent
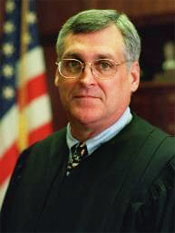

Judge of the United States District Court for the Southern District of Texas
- In office October 1, 1990 – June 30, 2009
- Appointed by: George H. W. Bush
- Preceded by: Hugh Gibson
- Succeeded by: Marina Garcia Marmolejo

Personal details
- Born: June 22, 1949 (age 77) Denver, Colorado, U.S.
- Party: Republican
- Education: University of Texas, Austin (BA, JD)

Samuel B. Kent (born June 22, 1949) is a former United States district judge of the United States District Court for the Southern District of Texas, whose term ended in resignation in 2009 following charges of sexual abuse.

Kent served in the single-judge Galveston Division covering Brazoria, Chambers, Galveston, and Matagorda Counties. A member of the Republican Party, he was nominated by President George H. W. Bush on August 3, 1990, to a seat vacated by Hugh Gibson, confirmed by the United States Senate on September 28, 1990, and received his commission on October 1, 1990. His tenure as a United States District Court judge was marred from 2001 on by a series of disciplinary actions, culminating in his impeachment and resignation in 2009.

On May 11, 2009, Judge Kent was sentenced to 33 months in prison for lying to investigators about sexually abusing two female employees. Dick DeGuerin, Kent's attorney, said the judge would retire from the bench because of a disability, rather than resign, which would have enabled Kent to continue to receive his $169,300 annual salary for life. That did not satisfy the leaders of the House Judiciary Committee, Representatives John Conyers Jr., (D-Mich.) and Lamar Smith (R-Tex.), who demanded that Kent resign immediately or face impeachment.

Judge Kent submitted his resignation on June 2, 2009, with the provision that it would not take effect for a full year. This angered the membership of the House Judiciary Committee, which voted unanimously to send four Articles of Impeachment to the full House of Representatives on June 10, 2009. The articles were passed on June 19, 2009, making Judge Kent the first federal judge to be impeached since Walter L. Nixon, Jr. in 1989. Kent thereafter submitted a new letter of resignation to the Senate on June 25, 2009, taking effect on June 30, 2009. On June 30, President Barack Obama accepted his resignation. On July 20, the House of Representatives passed a resolution asking the Senate to end former Judge Kent's trial. Two days later, the Senate agreed to the resolution.

== Background ==
Born in Denver, Colorado, Kent graduated from the University of Texas at Austin and the University of Texas School of Law, with a Bachelor of Arts degree in English (1971) and a Juris Doctor (1975). Prior to appointment on the federal bench, Kent was a partner with the firm Royston, Rayzor, Vickery and Williams in Galveston, Texas.

== Discipline ==
=== 2001 case reassignment ===
In 2001, the Chief Judge of the Southern District of Texas reassigned 85 cases away from Kent that were being handled by Richard Melancon, an attorney who was considered a close friend of Kent.

=== 2007 misconduct discipline ===
In August 2007, Chief Judge Hayden Wilson Head Jr. of the Southern District of Texas issued an order indicating that Kent would not be hearing cases between September 1, 2007, and January 1, 2008. During Kent's four-month leave of absence, he continued to draw his annual salary. He did not perform judicial work, with his cases instead allocated to other judges. Kent was transferred to the Houston division of the Southern District of Texas in January 2008.

=== Criminal charges ===
On December 20, 2007, the Fifth Circuit issued an order indicating that there was an ongoing Department of Justice criminal investigation into the allegations underlying a complaint to the Judicial Council regarding Kent.

On August 28, 2008, Kent was indicted in federal court on three counts of abusive sexual contact and attempted aggravated sexual abuse, stemming from the same alleged conduct that was the basis for the 2007 misconduct complaint. He was the first federal judge to be charged with federal sex crimes. On January 6, 2009, the federal grand jury that indicted him added three additional counts, for aggravated sexual abuse, abusive sexual contact and obstruction of justice. On February 23, 2009, the day on which jury selection was to begin, Kent pleaded guilty to one count of obstruction of justice, and agreed to retire as judge, although it was unclear whether he would be permitted to retire rather than resign. Kent was sentenced on May 11, 2009.

Although Kent purported to "retire", the minimum age at which a federal judge may retire with a pension is generally age 65, a condition that Kent, at age 59, did not meet. An exception allowing for early retirement is available where the judge seeking to retire certifies to the President that he is "permanently disabled from performing his duties," supplying a certification to that effect issued by the chief judge of the circuit. However, in May 2009, the United States Court of Appeals for the Fifth Circuit, in an opinion written by Chief Judge Edith Jones, denied Kent's disability status, and instead recommended his impeachment.

Kent continued to draw his salary until the effective date of his resignation on June 30, 2009. Had he not resigned, he would have been paid until convicted by the Senate in his impeachment trial. The requirement of Article III that federal judges "shall, at stated times, receive for their services, a compensation, which shall not be diminished during their continuance in office" may preclude action against his salary barring impeachment. Despite Kent's retirement, had he been impeached and convicted, he would have lost his retirement benefits.

=== Sentencing ===
Kent pleaded guilty in February 2009 to obstruction of justice for lying to a judicial committee investigating an allegation he sexually harassed an employee. He also acknowledged that he had had non-consensual sexual contact with two female employees between 2003 and 2007. He was sentenced on May 11, 2009, to serve 33 months in federal prison on the charge of obstructing justice in the investigation of the sexual abuse accusations. The obstruction charge carried a maximum punishment of 20 years in prison.

As part of a plea agreement, Kent admitted that the sexual conduct was non-consensual. Kent had to pay a $1,000 fine and a total of $6,550 in restitution to the two victims. While in prison he was required to take part in the Bureau of Prisons Alcohol Treatment Program. In pronouncing sentence over Kent, visiting Judge Roger Vinson stated, "Your wrongful conduct is a huge black X ... a stain on the judicial system itself, a matter of concern in the federal courts". On June 15, 2009, Kent reported to the Federal Medical Center, Devens in Devens, Massachusetts, to begin his sentence. In November 2009, he was transferred to a Florida state prison.

In July 2011, Kent was released on furlough to attend his daughter's wedding, after which he served out the remainder of his sentence confined to his home in West Texas. His sentence was completed November 4, 2011.

== Impeachment proceedings ==
=== The start of proceedings ===
On May 12, 2009, soon after Kent was sentenced to 33 months in prison, Representatives John Conyers, Jr. and James Sensenbrenner introduced separate resolutions (H.Res. 424 and H.Res. 431), which were referred to the House Judiciary Committee which two days later voted to begin impeachment proceedings as a reaction to Kent's refusal to resign.

On May 27, 2009, the United States Court of Appeals for the Fifth Circuit recommended that Kent be impeached and ordered that he not be given disability status. Chief Judge Edith Jones wrote that "a claimant should not profit from his own wrongdoing by engaging in criminal misconduct and then collecting a federal retirement salary for the disability related to the prosecution". Jones also noted that Kent did not appear to be disabled or impaired. The Fifth Circuit's Judicial Council urged the Judicial Conference of the United States to "take expeditious action" toward impeachment proceedings before Congress.

=== First resignation and congressional hearings ===
On June 2, 2009, Judge Kent submitted his resignation to President Obama in an unsuccessful attempt to avoid hearings in Congress. The resignation, had it not been precluded by removal from office, would have been effective as of June 1, 2010.

Chaired by Representative Adam Schiff, the hearings featured testimony from his accusers, Cathy McBroom and Donna Wilkerson. Kent and his lawyer, Dick DeGuerin, refused to attend, calling it a "circus". On June 9, the Task Force unanimously voted to report four articles to the full House Judiciary Committee. The next day, the Judiciary Committee voted unanimously to send them to the full House.

=== Impeachment, Senate trial, and second resignation ===
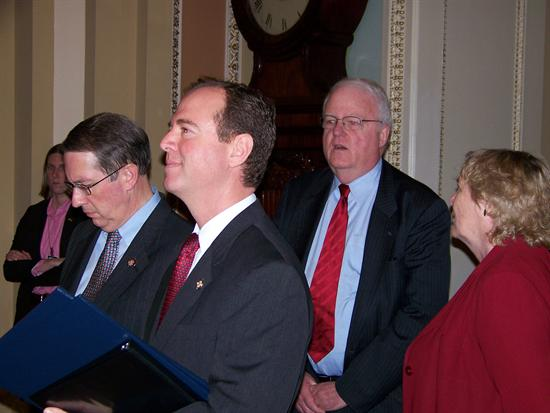
The House Managers wait to take the Articles of Impeachment to the Senate on June 24. First row: Bob Goodlatte and Adam Schiff, lead Managers. Second row: Jim Sensenbrenner and Zoe Lofgren.

The vote for impeachment in the House was scheduled to take place on June 18, but it was postponed until the next day due to prolonged debate over an appropriations bill. All four articles of impeachment were passed by the House of Representatives, three unanimously and one having only a single member, Mel Watt (D-NC), voting "present". After the articles were approved, Representatives Adam Schiff (D-CA), Zoe Lofgren (D-CA), Hank Johnson (D-GA), Bob Goodlatte (R-VA), and Jim Sensenbrenner (R-WI) were appointed as managers to conduct the trial in the Senate, with Schiff and Goodlatte being designated as lead managers. The articles of impeachment were sent to the Senate, where the proceedings were started on June 24. On that day, Senators passed two resolutions: one providing for a summons for Kent to answer the articles against him, and the other providing for a committee to analyze the evidence against him and report their findings to the full Senate. Senators Claire McCaskill (D-MO) and Mel Martinez (R-FL) were designated as Chair and Vice Chair, respectively, of the committee. On June 25, when Senate officials traveled to the prison facility where Kent was confined to serve him with the formal summons to the impeachment trial, he presented them with a new resignation letter, effective on June 30. The development was reported to the Senate, which directed that copies of Kent's letter be sent to President Obama and the House of Representatives. On June 30, President Obama accepted his resignation and on July 20, the House of Representatives passed a resolution asking the Senate to end the impeachment trial against Kent. The Senate agreed to the resolution on July 22.

Legal offices
Preceded by Hugh Gibson	Judge of the United States District Court for the Southern District of Texas; 1990–2009	Succeeded by Marina Garcia Marmolejo
