= Marina Garcia Marmolejo =

Mexican-American judge (born 1971)

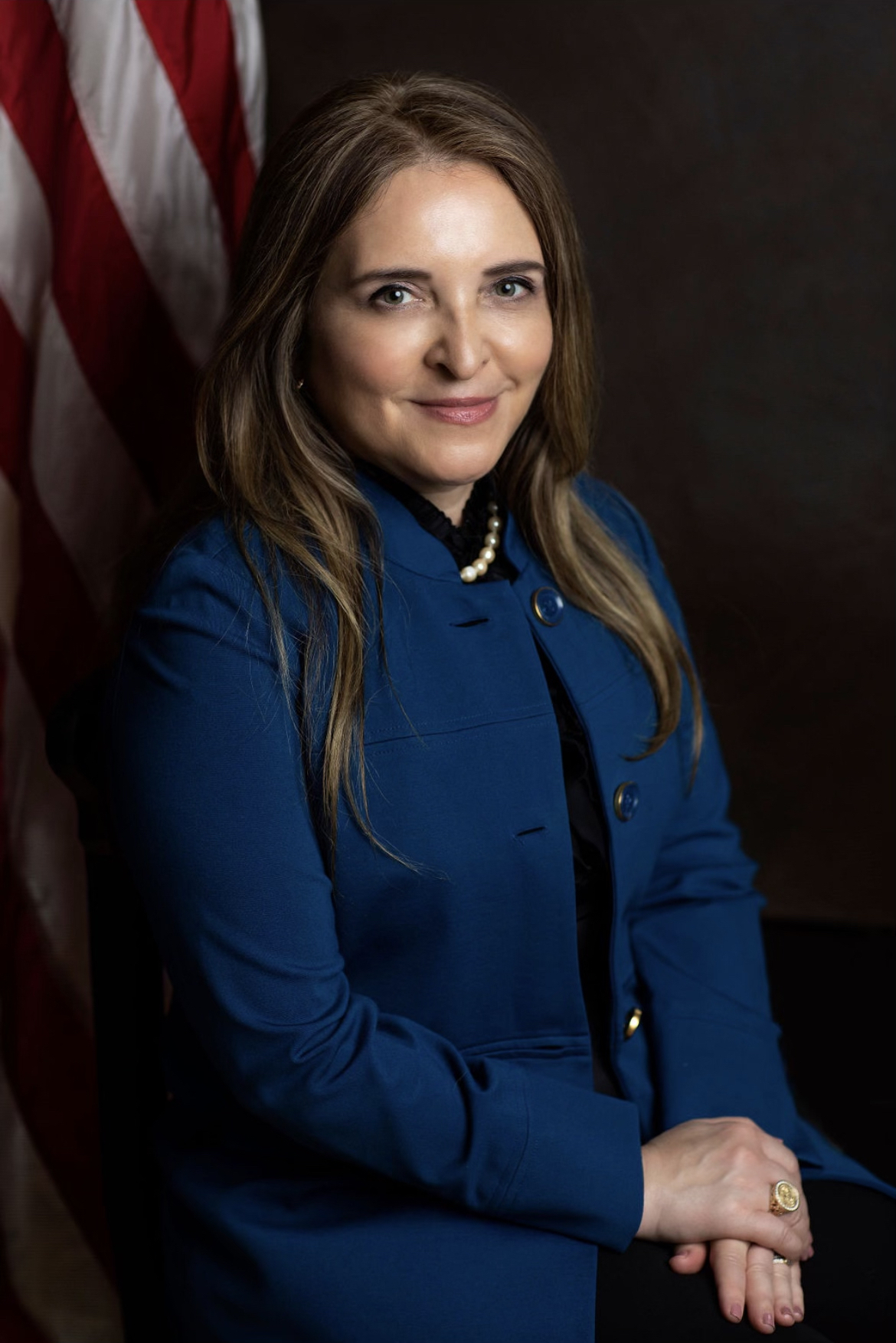
- Garcia Marmolejo in 2022

Judge of the United States District Court for the Southern District of Texas
- Incumbent
- Assumed office October 4, 2011
- Appointed by: Barack Obama
- Preceded by: Samuel B. Kent

Personal details
- Born: 1971 (age 54–55) Nuevo Laredo, Mexico
- Education: University of the Incarnate Word (BA); St. Mary's University, Texas (MA, JD); Duke University School of Law (LLM)

Marina Garcia Marmolejo (born 1971) is a United States district judge of the United States District Court for the Southern District of Texas.

== Early life and education ==
Garcia Marmolejo was born in Nuevo Laredo, Tamaulipas, Mexico and is a naturalized United States citizen. She received a Bachelor of Arts degree from the University of the Incarnate Word in 1992. In 1993, Garcia Marmolejo served as a substitute teacher in the United Independent School District in Laredo, Texas. From 1993 to 1996, she worked as a research assistant to Professor Raul M. Sanchez at St. Mary's University School of Law, where she also worked as a Property tutor and a student attorney at the Criminal Justice Clinic. She then attended St. Mary's University in San Antonio, Texas, where she earned a Master of Arts degree and her Juris Doctor, both in 1996. In 2020, Garcia Marmolejo earned her Master of Laws in Judicial Studies from Duke University School of Law. Her LL.M. thesis, Jack of All Trades, Masters of None: Giving Jurors the Tools They Need to Reach the Right Verdict, was selected for publication in the George Mason Law Review.

== Career ==
Before becoming a federal judge, Garcia Marmolejo began her legal career as an Assistant Federal Public Defender. From 1996 to 1998, served as a federal defender in the Western District of Texas, and from 1998 to 1999, she served as a federal defender in the Southern District of Texas. She earned the highest performance evaluation each year.

In 1999, she served as an assistant United States attorney for the Southern District of Texas. For her prosecutorial work, Garcia Marmolejo received awards from the Department of Homeland Security, Drug Enforcement Administration, Federal Bureau of Investigation, and Immigration and Customs Enforcement. As a federal public defender and federal prosecutor, Garcia Marmolejo tried over 30 cases to verdict.

In 2007, she moved into private practice and helped open the San Antonio office of Thompson & Knight, where she served as Of Counsel. In 2009, Marmolejo was hired to be a partner with the law firm of Reid Collins Tsai LLP in their Austin office.

=== Federal judicial service ===
During the 111th Congress, Democrats from the Texas House delegation and Republican U.S. Senators John Cornyn and Kay Bailey Hutchison agreed to recommend Marmolejo for a Laredo vacancy on the Southern District of Texas. On July 28, 2010, President Barack Obama nominated Marmolejo to replace Samuel B. Kent. The Senate confirmed Marmolejo by unanimous consent on October 3, 2011, and she received her judicial commission on October 4, 2011.

Since taking the bench, Garcia Marmolejo has heard over 12,000 cases, presided over nearly 100 trials, and maintained a reversal rate of less than 1%. Notably, Garcia Marmolejo is credited with being the first jurist to conclude that after the First Step Act of 2018, a judge has the discretion to look beyond the U.S. Sentencing Commission's policy statements to determine what constitutes an "extraordinary and compelling" circumstance to justify compassionate release. According to the legal database Westlaw, more than 450 cases have cited her opinion on this issue. In 2022, she became a Jurist in Residence at her alma mater, St. Mary's University School of Law. She also founded St. Mary's clerkship mentorship program.

=== Consideration for Fifth Circuit ===
Marmolejo had been considered a candidate for a vacancy on the United States Court of Appeals for the Fifth Circuit, along with District Judge Xavier Rodriguez.

== See also ==
- List of Hispanic and Latino American jurists

Legal offices
Preceded by Samuel B. Kent	Judge of the United States District Court for the Southern District of Texas; 2011–present	Incumbent
