= United States Senate Homeland Security Subcommittee on Contracting Oversight =

The Senate Homeland Security and Governmental Affairs Ad Hoc Subcommittee on Contracting Oversight is one of the six subcommittees within the Senate Committee on Homeland Security and Governmental Affairs

The Subcommittee is an ad hoc subcommittee, meaning "for this purpose." Ad Hoc committees are created for a single issue, and are disbanded after the issue is resolved.

== Members, 112th Congress ==
The subcommittee was chaired by Democrat Claire McCaskill of Missouri, and the Ranking Minority Member was Republican Rob Portman of Ohio.

Majority	Minority
Claire McCaskill, Missouri, Chairwoman; Thomas R. Carper, Delaware; Mark Pryor, Arkansas; Jon Tester, Montana; Mark Begich, Alaska	Rob Portman, Ohio, Ranking Member; Susan Collins, Maine; John McCain, Arizona; Rand Paul, Kentucky
Ex officio
Joe Lieberman, Connecticut	Susan Collins, Maine
