= James Latane Noel Jr. =

American judge

Senior Judge of the United States District Court for the Southern District of Texas
- In office December 15, 1976 – August 29, 1997

Judge of the United States District Court for the Southern District of Texas
- In office October 5, 1961 – December 15, 1976
- Appointed by: John F. Kennedy
- Preceded by: Seat established by 75 Stat. 80
- Succeeded by: Finis E. Cowan

Personal details
- Born: October 28, 1909 Pilot Point, Texas, U.S.
- Died: August 29, 1997 (aged 87) Houston, Texas, U.S.
- Education: Southern Methodist University (B.A.); Dedman School of Law (LL.B.)

James Latane Noel Jr. (October 28, 1909 – August 29, 1997) was a United States district judge of the United States District Court for the Southern District of Texas.

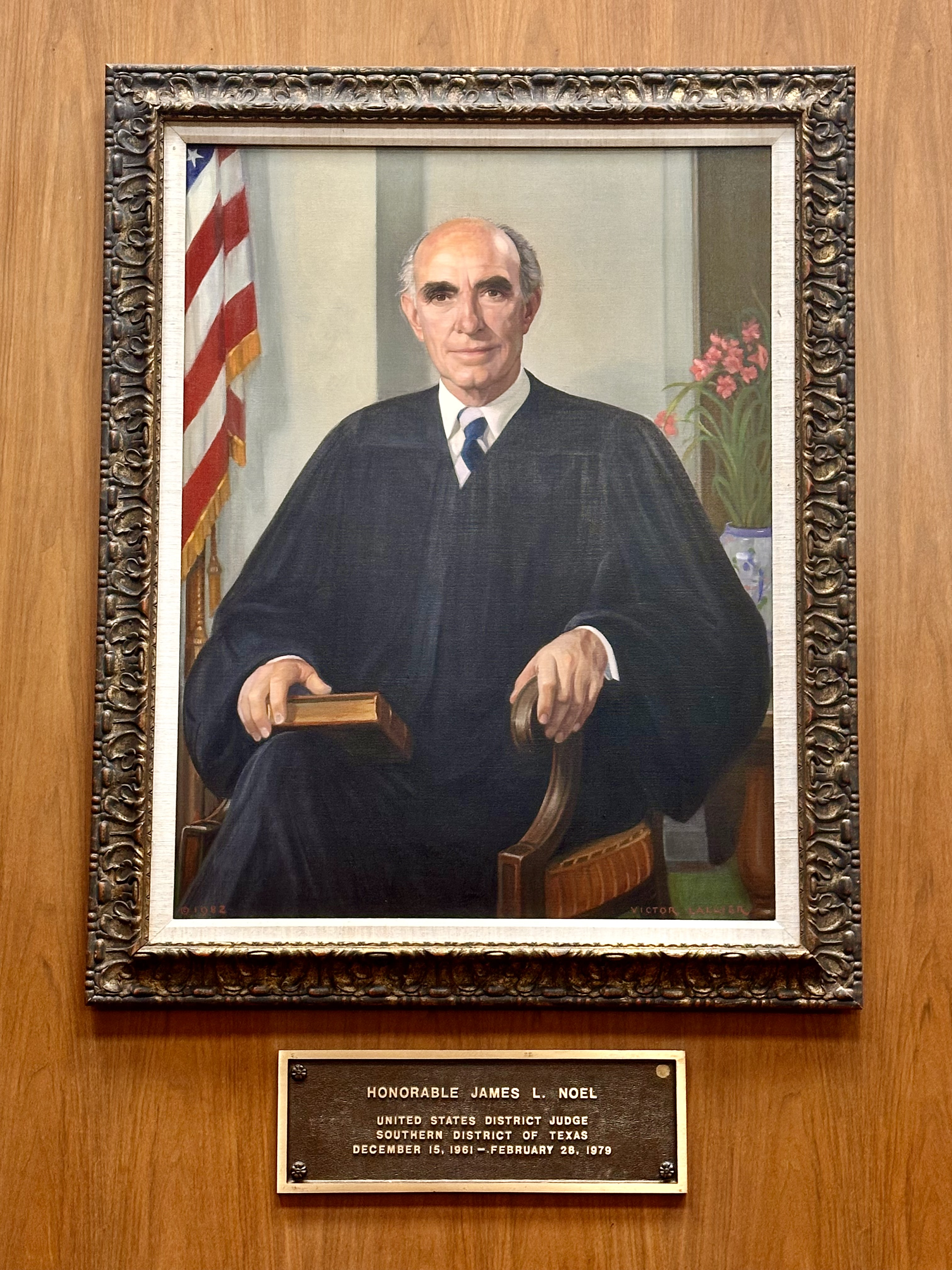
Portrait of Judge James L. Noel in Courtroom 11A of the Bob Casey Federal Building in Houston, Texas.

== Education and career ==
Born in Pilot Point, Texas, Noel received a Bachelor of Science degree in civil engineering from Southern Methodist University in 1931, a Bachelor of Science in Commerce from that institution in 1932, and a Bachelor of Laws from Dedman School of Law at Southern Methodist University in 1937. He was an assistant district attorney of Dallas County, Texas from 1937 to 1938, and was then Attorney General of Texas from 1939 to 1942, and from 1945 to 1946. He served in the United States Naval Reserve during World War II. He was in private practice in Houston, Texas from 1946 to 1961.

== Federal judicial service ==
On October 5, 1961, Noel received a recess appointment from President John F. Kennedy to a new seat on the United States District Court for the Southern District of Texas created by 75 Stat. 80. He was formally nominated to the same seat by President Kennedy on January 15, 1962. He was confirmed by the United States Senate on March 16, 1962, and received his commission on March 17, 1962. He assumed senior status on December 15, 1976, serving in that capacity until his death on August 29, 1997, in Houston.

=== Notable case ===
Noel was an arbiter in the case involving the Westheimer Independent School District; he prevented the Houston Independent School District (HISD) from having an injunction against the completed election for Westheimer ISD to secede from HISD.

== Sources ==
Legal offices
Preceded by Seat established by 75 Stat. 80	Judge of the United States District Court for the Southern District of Texas; 1961–1976	Succeeded by Finis E. Cowan
