= 2002 Missouri State Auditor election =

- November 5, 2002
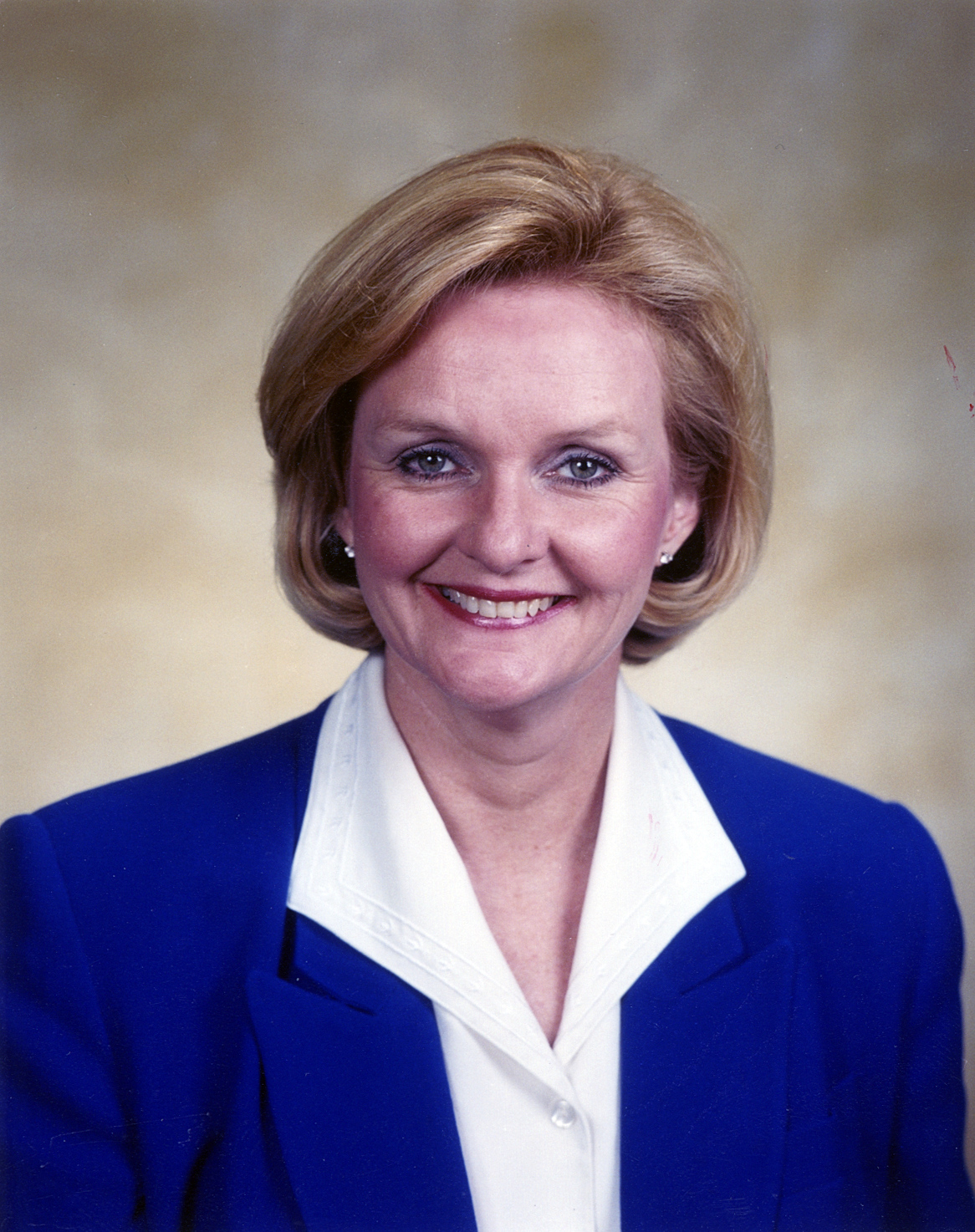

Nominee	Claire McCaskill	Allen D. Hanson
Party	Democratic	Republican
Popular vote	1,090,593	664,982
Percentage	59.95%	36.56%
- County results McCaskill: 40–50% 50–60% 60–70% 70–80% 80–90% Hanson: 40–50% 50–60% 60–70%
State Auditor before election
Claire McCaskill
Democratic
Elected State Auditor
Claire McCaskill
Democratic

The 2002 Missouri State Auditor election was held on November 5, 2002, in order to elect the state auditor of Missouri. Democratic nominee and incumbent state auditor Claire McCaskill defeated Republican nominee Allen D. Hanson, Libertarian nominee Arnold J. Trembley and Green nominee Fred Kennell.

== General election ==
On election day, November 5, 2002, Democratic nominee Claire McCaskill won re-election by a margin of 425,611 votes against her foremost opponent Republican nominee Allen D. Hanson, thereby retaining Democratic control over the office of state auditor. McCaskill was sworn in for her second term on January 3, 2003.

=== Results ===
Missouri State Auditor election, 2002
Party	Candidate	Votes	%
Democratic	Claire McCaskill (incumbent)	1,090,593	59.95
Republican	Allen D. Hanson	664,982	36.56
Libertarian	Arnold J. Trembley	39,891	2.19
Green	Fred Kennell	23,521	1.30
Total votes		1,818,987	100.00
Democratic hold			
