= 1998 Missouri State Auditor election =

- November 3, 1998
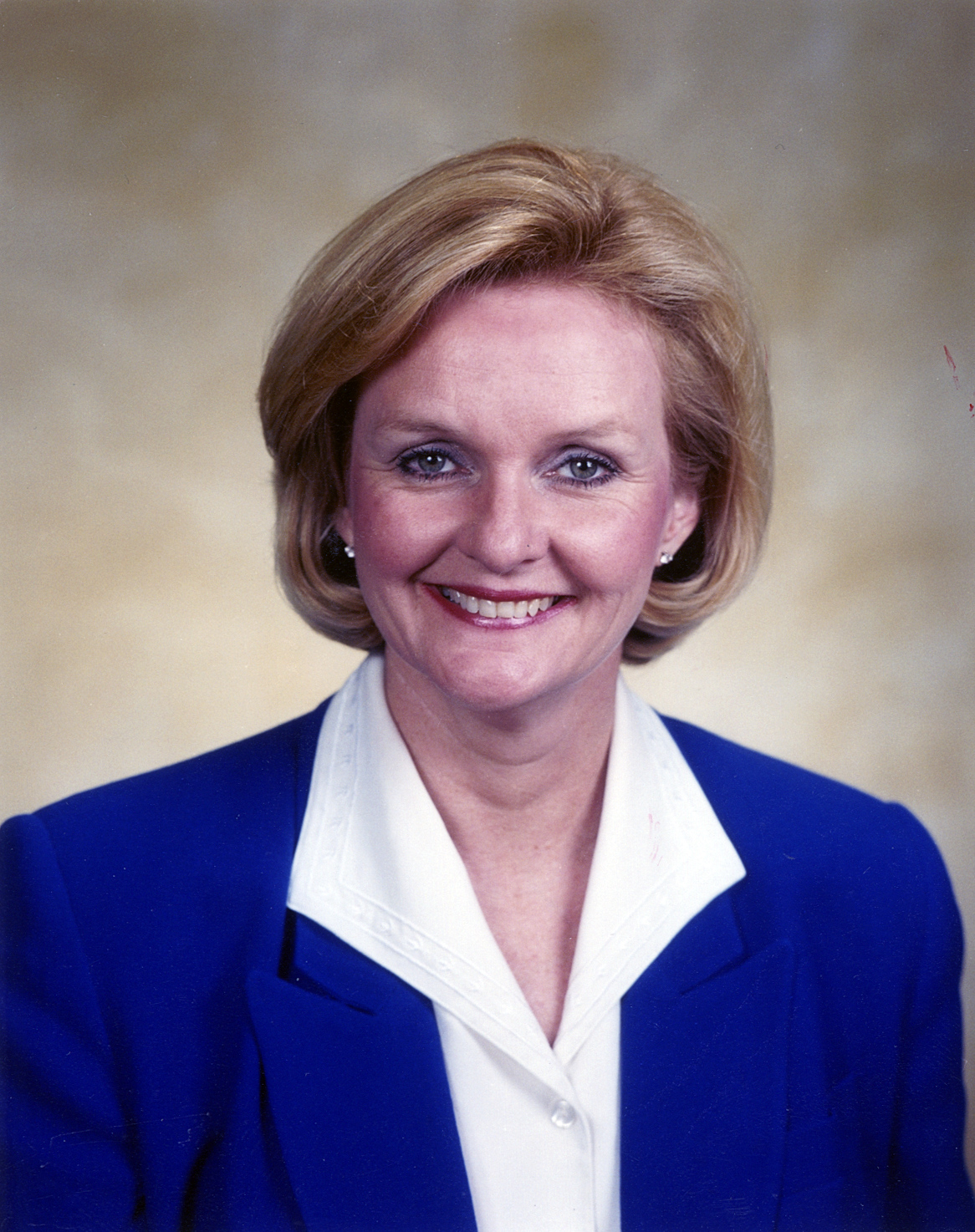

Nominee	Claire McCaskill	Charles A. Pierce
Party	Democratic	Republican
Popular vote	780,178	719,653
Percentage	50.30%	46.40%
- County results McCaskill: 40–50% 50–60% 60–70% 70–80% Pierce: 40–50% 50–60% 60–70%
State Auditor before election
Margaret B. Kelly
Republican
Elected State Auditor
Claire McCaskill
Democratic

The 1998 Missouri State Auditor election was held on November 3, 1998, in order to elect the state auditor of Missouri. Democratic nominee and former member of the Missouri House of Representatives Claire McCaskill defeated Republican nominee Charles A. Pierce, Libertarian nominee Gerald R. Geier and Reform nominee and former member of the Missouri House of Representatives George D. Weber.

== General election ==
On election day, November 3, 1998, Democratic nominee Claire McCaskill won the election by a margin of 60,525 votes against her foremost opponent Republican nominee Charles A. Pierce, thereby gaining Democratic control over the office of state auditor. McCaskill was sworn in as the 34th state auditor of Missouri on January 3, 1999.

=== Results ===
Missouri State Auditor election, 1998
Party	Candidate	Votes	%
Democratic	Claire McCaskill	780,178	50.30
Republican	Charles A. Pierce	719,653	46.40
Libertarian	Gerald R. Geier	26,955	1.74
Reform	George D. Weber	24,188	1.56
Total votes		1,550,974	100.00
Democratic gain from Republican			
