= Victims Protection Act of 2014 =

- Long title: To provide for additional enhancements of the sexual assault prevention and response activities of the Armed Forces.
- Announced in: the 113th United States Congress
- Sponsored by: Sen. Claire McCaskill (D, MO)
- Number of co-sponsors: 2

Codification
- U.S.C. sections affected: 10 U.S.C. § 920, 10 U.S.C. § 1044e, 10 U.S.C. § 880, 10 U.S.C. § 925
- Agencies affected: United States Department of Justice, United States Congress, United States Department of Defense

Legislative history
- Introduced in the Senate as S. 1917 by Sen. Claire McCaskill (D, MO) on January 14, 2014; Committee consideration by United States House Committee on Armed Services, United States House Committee on Transportation and Infrastructure, United States House Committee on the Judiciary; Passed the Senate on March 10, 2014 (Roll Call Vote 62: 97-0)

The Victims Protection Act of 2014 (S. 1917) is a bill intended to help protect the victims of sexual assault in the military. The bill would allow victims to give a preferences as to whether they would prefers their cases take place in the military or in the civilian justice systems. It also applies these changes to the military academies as well.

It was passed by the United States Senate during the 113th United States Congress.

== Background ==
The Senate worked on and rejected another bill related to sexual assault in the military, written by Senator Kirsten Gillibrand, the previous week. S. 1917 is considered less controversial than the bill previously rejected, although they were intended to address the same issue. Gillibrand's bill was controversial because it took the decision about prosecuting sexual assaults away from the military chain of command.

== Provisions of the bill ==
This summary is based largely on the summary provided by the Congressional Research Service, a public domain source.

The Victims Protection Act of 2014 would amend the National Defense Authorization Act for Fiscal Year 2014 (NDAA 2014) to revise the sexual assault prevention and response program activities of the Armed Forces.

In section two, the bill would amend NDAA 2014 to include the senior trial counsel detailed to a case involving sex-related charges in the process for determining whether such charges should be referred for a court-martial (currently, such determination is made solely by the staff judge advocate).

Section three would require the Special Victims' Counsel, in cases involving sexual assaults in the military, to provide advice to assault victims on the advantages and disadvantages of prosecuting such assaults by court-martial or in a civilian court. Requires the Secretaries of the military departments to: (1) establish a process to ensure consultation with the victim of a sexual assault to determine such victim's preference for prosecuting such assault either by court-martial or in a civilian court, and (2) afford great weight to such preference in determining which court shall prosecute the offense. Requires notification to a victim who expresses a preference for prosecution in a civilian court if a decision is made to decline prosecution or prosecute such offense by court-martial.

The bill would require performance appraisals of: (1) officers and enlisted personnel of the Armed Forces to include an assessment of the extent to which such members support their respective sexual assault prevention and response programs, and (2) a commanding officer to indicate the extent to which such officer has established a command climate in which allegations of sexual assault are properly managed and fairly evaluated and a victim can report criminal activity without fear of retaliation or ostracism.

The bill would require the Secretaries of the military departments to establish a process for a command climate assessment and for a confidential challenge by an individual who was the victim of a sexual assault of the terms or characterization of such individual's discharge or separation from the Armed Forces.

The bill would require a modification of the Military Rules of Evidence to clarify that evidence of the general military character of an individual accused of a criminal offense (good soldier defense) shall not be admissible for the purpose of showing the probability of innocence of such individual, unless such evidence is relevant to an element of the offense for which the accused has been charged.

Section four would require the Secretary of the military department concerned to ensure that provisions of NDAA 2014 relating to sexual assault prevention and response apply to the U.S. Military Academy, the Naval Academy, and the Air Force Academy. Requires the Secretary of Homeland Security (DHS) to ensure that such provisions apply to the Coast Guard Academy.

Section five would require the Secretary of Defense (DOD) and the Attorney General to jointly develop a strategic framework for collaboration between DOD and the Department of Justice (DOJ) to prevent and respond to cases of sexual assault and report to the Armed Services and Judiciary Committees of Congress on such framework. Requires such framework to be based on and to include: (1) an assessment of the role of DOD in investigations and prosecutions of sexual assault cases in which DOD and DOJ have concurrent jurisdiction; (2) an assessment of the feasibility of establishing the position of advisor on military sexual assaults within DOJ and provide DOD investigative and other assistance in sexual assault cases on domestic and overseas military installations; (3) an assessment of the number of unsolved sexual assault cases; (4) a strategy to leverage efforts by DOD and DOJ to improve the quality of investigations, prosecutions, specialized training, services to victims, awareness, and prevention and to address social conditions that relate to sexual assault; and (5) mechanisms to promote information sharing and best practices between DOD and DOJ.

Section six would advance from 120 to 60 days after the enactment of NDAA 2014 the due date for the report of the DOD Secretary on a proposed punitive article under the Uniform Code of Military Justice (UCMJ) for violations of prohibitions against inappropriate contact with prospective and new members of the Armed Forces.

Section seven would express the sense of the Senate that: (1) the panel to review and assess the systems used to respond to sexual assault established by NDAA 2014 is conducting an independent assessment of the systems used to investigate, prosecute, and adjudicate crimes involving adult sexual assault and related offenses; (2) the work of such panel will be critical in informing the efforts of Congress to combat rape, sexual assault, and other sex-related crimes in the Armed Forces; (3) the panel should include in its assessment a review of the reforms that will be enacted by NDAA 2014; and (4) the views of the victim advocate community should continue to be well-represented on the panel.

== Procedural history ==
The Victims Protection Act of 2014 was introduced into the United States Senate on January 14, 2014, by Sen. Claire McCaskill (D, MO). On March 10, 2014, the Senate voted in Roll Call Vote 62 to pass the bill 97–0. The United States House of Representatives received the bill on March 11, 2014, and referred it to the United States House Committee on Armed Services, the United States House Committee on Transportation and Infrastructure, and the United States House Committee on the Judiciary.

== Debate and discussion ==
Senator Carl Levin (D-MI) spoke out in favor of the bill saying it has "important new protections."

== See also ==
- List of bills in the 113th United States Congress
- Courts-martial in the United States
