= Hugh Gibson (judge) =

American judge (1918–1998)

Senior Judge of the United States District Court for the Southern District of Texas
- In office November 1, 1989 – June 18, 1998

Judge of the United States District Court for the Southern District of Texas
- In office October 5, 1979 – November 1, 1989
- Appointed by: Jimmy Carter
- Preceded by: Finis E. Cowan
- Succeeded by: Samuel B. Kent

Personal details
- Born: Hugh Gibson; November 8, 1918 Cameron, Texas, U.S.
- Died: June 18, 1998 (aged 79) Galveston, Texas, U.S.
- Education: Rice University (BA); Baylor Law School (LLB)

Hugh Gibson (November 8, 1918 – June 18, 1998) was a United States district judge of the United States District Court for the Southern District of Texas.

== Education and career ==
Gibson was born in Cameron, Texas, and received a Bachelor of Arts degree from Rice University in 1940. He was a Sergeant in the United States Army during World War II, serving from 1942 to 1945. He returned to his studies, earning a Bachelor of Laws from Baylor Law School in 1948. He taught as a professor at Baylor for a year after his graduation, and then worked as an assistant district attorney in Galveston, Texas, from 1949 to 1952, and an assistant city attorney for Galveston from 1951 to 1953. In 1954, he became a judge of the Probate Court of Galveston County, Texas, and continued in that office until 1968. In 1969, he became a judge of the 56th Judicial District of Texas, until his elevation to the federal bench in 1979.

== Federal judicial service ==
On July 31, 1979, President Jimmy Carter nominated Gibson to a seat on the United States District Court for the Southern District of Texas vacated by Judge Finis E. Cowan. Gibson was confirmed by the United States Senate on October 4, 1979, and received his commission the following day. Gibson assumed senior status on November 1, 1989, and continued to serve in that capacity until his death on June 18, 1998, in Galveston.

Legal offices
Preceded by Finis E. Cowan	Judge of the United States District Court for the Southern District of Texas; 1979–1989	Succeeded by Samuel B. Kent
