= Albert Riederer =

American judge

Judge of the Missouri Court of Appeals
- In office 1997–1999

Albert Andrew Riederer (September 30, 1945 – December 27, 2012) was an American jurist and politician.

Riederer graduated from St. Louis University and New York University Law School. He served as a judge of the Missouri Court of Appeals 1997–1999. He was a prosecutor and a Jackson County, Missouri county legislator.
