= Finis E. Cowan =

American judge (1929–2023)

Judge of the United States District Court for the Southern District of Texas
- In office June 14, 1977 – June 30, 1979
- Appointed by: Jimmy Carter
- Preceded by: James Latane Noel Jr.
- Succeeded by: Hugh Gibson

Personal details
- Born: Finis Ewing Cowan Jr. October 16, 1929 Dallas, Texas, U.S.
- Died: November 15, 2023 (aged 94) Dickinson, Texas, U.S.
- Education: Rice University (BA); University of Texas School of Law (LLB)

Finis Ewing Cowan Jr. (October 16, 1929 – November 15, 2023) was a United States district judge of the United States District Court for the Southern District of Texas and was an attorney in private practice.

== Education and career ==
Born on October 16, 1929, in Dallas, Texas, Cowan received a Bachelor of Arts degree from Rice University in 1951 and a Bachelor of Laws from the University of Texas School of Law in 1956, graduating Order of the Coif. He was a United States Marine Corps Lieutenant during the Korean War, from 1951 to 1953. He was in private practice in Houston, Texas from 1956 to 1977.

== Federal judicial service ==
On May 19, 1977, Cowan was nominated by President Jimmy Carter to a seat on the Galveston Division of the United States District Court for the Southern District of Texas vacated by Judge James Latane Noel Jr. Cowan was confirmed by the United States Senate on June 13, 1977, and received his commission on June 14, 1977. Cowan served in that capacity for just over two years, resigning on June 30, 1979, and returning to private practice in Houston.

== Post judicial service ==
Cowan remained in the private practice of law since his resignation from the federal bench. He served with the law firm of Yetter Coleman LLP and was in active service as of April 2018.

Cowan died in Dickinson, Texas, on November 15, 2023, at the age of 94.

== Sources ==
Legal offices
Preceded by James Latane Noel Jr.	Judge of the United States District Court for the Southern District of Texas; 1977–1979	Succeeded by Hugh Gibson
