= Reid Collins & Tsai =

American law firm

Reid Collins & Tsai LLP
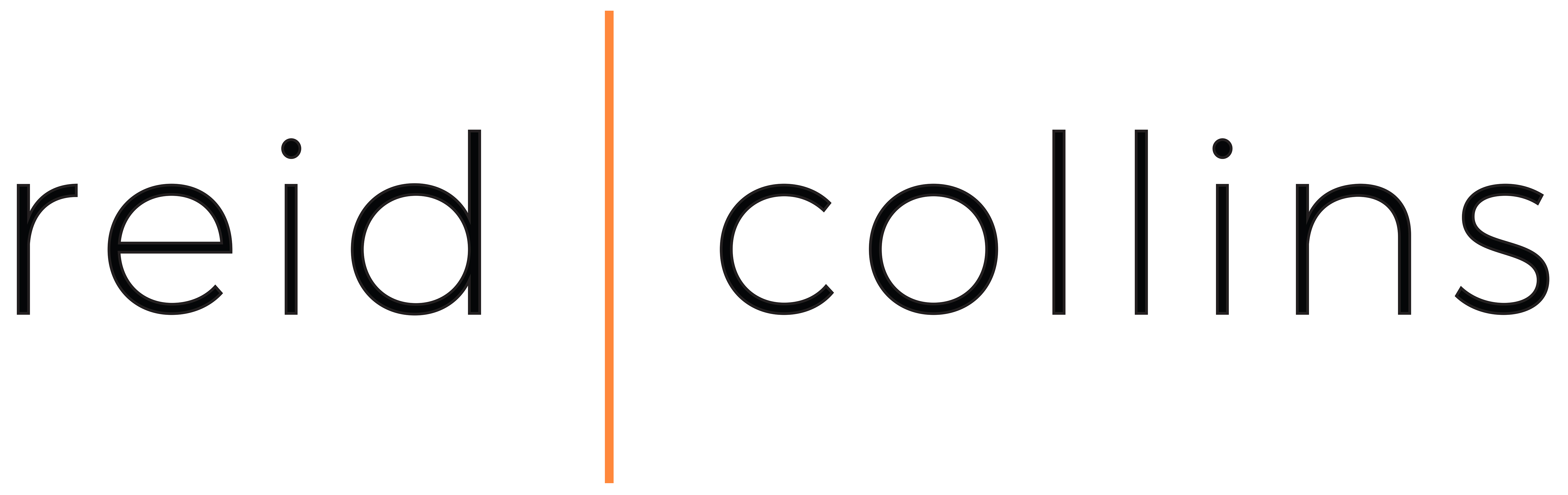
- No. of offices: 5
- Offices: New York, Austin, Dallas, Wilmington, and Washington D.C.
- No. of employees: 50
- Major practice areas: Complex plaintiff’s contingency fee litigation, business litigation, insolvency litigation
- Key people: William T. Reid, IV, Lisa S. Tsai, and Eric D. Madden
- Date founded: November 23, 2009
- Company type: Limited liability partnership
- Website: reidcollins.com

Reid Collins & Tsai LLP is a national trial law firm with offices in New York, Austin, Dallas, Wilmington, and Washington, D.C. The firm represents plaintiffs in complex commercial litigation on a mixed-fee or contingency-fee basis.

== Practice areas ==
Key practice areas include financial fraud, professional liability, fiduciary litigation, bankruptcy litigation, insolvency cases, and whistleblower actions.

== History ==
The firm was formed in November 2009 with nine lawyers who had previously worked at Diamond McCarthy and the U.S. Department of Justice, including founding partners William T. Reid, IV and Lisa S. Tsai. Among their first cases were the bankruptcies of Stanford International Bank, Thelen LLP and Cornerstone Ministries Investments. In 2010, hedge fund Highland Capital Management hired the firm to represent their funds in a fraud and contract lawsuit against Credit Suisse on a contingency-fee basis. By the end of 2010, the firm had 15 lawyers. In 2013, the firm opened a Dallas office with partners Eric D. Madden and J. Benjamin King. In October 2014 the Dallas office moved to Thanksgiving Tower. In November 2018, the firm added former Munger, Tolles & Olson partner Marc T.G. Dworsky as a partner. In March 2021, the firm opened a Wilmington, Delaware office with Jonathan Kass as a partner and Norman Monhait as counsel. Today, the firm has 40 lawyers who prosecute claims in state and federal courts around the country.

== Notable cases ==
- In July 2018, Reid Collins commenced litigation in New York state court on behalf of Renren shareholders asserting claims under Cayman Islands law and New York law. The action alleges a scheme by Renren insiders to wrongfully to take the company’s billion-dollar investment portfolio for themselves (In re Renren, Inc. Derivative Litigation, Index Number: 653594/2018, Supreme Court of the State of New York, New York County, Commercial Division). In both trial court and on appeal, Defendants’ motions to dismiss the case based on issues of personal jurisdiction and standing were denied. In June 2022, the Court approved a $300 million settlement resolving the action, which is one of the largest cash settlements of a derivative action in history.
- The firm represented Plaintiff Claymore Holdings as the assignee of the claims of investment funds managed by Highland Capital Management in a fraudulent inducement and breach of contract lawsuit against global investment bank Credit Suisse related to a Las Vegas real estate development (Claymore Holdings, LLC vs. Credit Suisse AG, et al., Cause No. DC-13-07858, the 134th Judicial District Court of Dallas County, Texas). In December 2014, a jury found that Credit Suisse fraudulently induced the plaintiff funds into making the investment and awarded $40 million. Following a subsequent three-week bench trial, the trial court also found that Credit Suisse had breached its contractual obligations, and entered a fraud judgment against the bank After subsequent appeals on multiple issues, the Texas Supreme Court affirmed the trial jury's finding that Credit Suisse committed fraud, and remanded the case to the trial court. In June 2021, the trial court awarded $40 million on the primary market loss, plus another $23 million on the secondary market loss. With pre- and post-verdict interest added, and after deducting the value of related settlements reached with other parties, the trial court entered a judgment for $121 million against Credit Suisse.
- The firm filed a qui tam (whistleblower) lawsuit against Citigroup, Bank of America, and Goldman Sachs, among other defendants, on behalf of relator client Integra REC to resolve claims by the Commonwealth of Virginia under the Virginia Fraud Against Taxpayers Act (the largest financial fraud case ever brought by the state of Virginia ~~-~~ (Case No. CL14-399). The claims arose from the sale of residential mortgage-backed securities to the Commonwealth by the defendant banks who ultimately resolved the litigation in a 2016 settlement in which $63 million was to be paid to the state.
- In February 2018, the firm won an important ruling on fraudulent transfer law in the U.S. Supreme Court in Merit Management v. FTI Consulting. Resolving a circuit split, the key ruling limited the application of Rule 546(e) of the bankruptcy code and opened new avenues of recovery for bankruptcy trustees
- In December 2018, Reid Collins filed a legal malpractice, breach of fiduciary duty, and breach of contract action in New York state court against law firm Reed Smith LLP on behalf of the liquidators of two Cayman Islands-based Bear Stearns investment funds seeking more than $500 million in damages. The parties settled the matter under confidential terms in October 2019.
- In January 2019, Reid Collins filed suit in Delaware Chancery Court on behalf of Sarah Bradley, the co-founder of private equity firm Kainos Capital LP, against her company and three of its executives for fraud and business agreement violations accusing them of a scheme to strip her of her ownership rights by changing the firm's business structure. The dispute addressed issues regarding duties owed between LLC members under Delaware law. In March 2020, Bradley settled her claims in exchange for a $20 million payment from Kainos Capital along with additional confidential settlement terms.
- In November 2019, Reid Collins filed a legal malpractice and breach of fiduciary duty lawsuit in New York federal court on behalf of the LB Litigation Trust against law firm Brown Rudnick LLP for $300 million in damages. In July 2020, the Court denied Brown Rudnick's motion to dismiss the proceedings. In January 2021, the parties reached a confidential settlement of the action.
- In March 2016, Reid Collins was selected to serve as special counsel to the Official Committee of Unsecured Creditors of Fresh & Easy, LLC, a large grocery company with stores located in four states, in pursuing claims against its former insiders—including billionaire Ronald Burkle—for breach of fiduciary duty and fraudulent transfer of certain assets. After conducting Rule 2004 discovery, Reid Collins filed a Complaint in the U.S. Bankruptcy Court for the District of Delaware and obtained a temporary restraining order freezing certain assets and preventing the insiders from further disposing of assets. Reid Collins then secured a settlement of those claims in exchange for a $21.5 million cash payment and the release of $104 million of insider claims against the estate, a settlement that doubled the projected distributions to unsecured creditors in the case.
- Nicholas Cosmo, the former principal of Hauppauge, NY-based Agape World, Inc., operated a Ponzi scheme where he raised money from investors for the ostensible purpose of making short-term real estate loans but instead used the funds to open futures trading accounts. Cosmo was arrested on January 26, 2009, and convicted in April 2015. Representing the bankruptcy Trustee for the Agape estate in the U.S. Bankruptcy Court for the Eastern District of New York, Reid Collins filed lawsuits against six commodities broker firms where Cosmo traded, including MF Global Inc., seeking to recover fraudulent transfers of Agape assets made to fund the risky futures trading. Reid Collins obtained settlements totaling in excess of $21 million on behalf of the Trustee.
- In July 2017, Reid Collins was selected to serve as special litigation counsel to the Official Committee of Unsecured Creditors of Central Grocers, Inc., one of the country’s largest grocery cooperatives with operations in Illinois, Indiana, and Michigan. After conducting pre-suit discovery, Reid Collins engaged in settlement discussions and obtained a $23.6 million settlement of the claims against the company's lenders, including PNC Bank, Bank of America, and U.S. Bank.
- In October 2014, GT Advanced Technologies filed for bankruptcy after failing to meet milestones under a critical $1 billion contract with Apple to manufacture sapphire display screens for the iPhone. Reid Collins represented the GTAT Litigation Trust in pursuing claims against the company’s former officers in New Hampshire federal court, filing a complaint and defeating a motion to dismiss in a lengthy reported opinion. After conducting discovery, the parties agreed to a confidential settlement of all claims.
