= List of University of Texas School of Law alumni =

This is a list of notable alumni of University of Texas School of Law, the law school of the University of Texas, located in Austin, Texas. The School of Law has 23,500 living alumni.

== Politics ==
- Steve Adler – mayor of Austin
- Robert B. Anderson – former United States secretary of the treasury; deputy secretary of defense
- William R. Archer – United States representative from Texas (1971–2001); chairman of United States House Committee on Ways and Means
- James Baker – former United States secretary of state; former United States secretary of the treasury; former White House chief of staff for President Ronald Reagan and President George H. W. Bush; campaign chairman of President Reagan's 1984 reelection; campaign chairman of President George H. W. Bush's 1988 election
- Ben Barnes – former lieutenant governor of Texas; National Democratic lobbyist
- Paul Begala – political consultant, commentator and former advisor to President Bill Clinton
- Lloyd Bentsen – former secretary of the Treasury and United States senator; former chair of United States Senate Committee on Finance; former candidate for president of the United States and vice president of the United States
- Robert Lee Bobbitt – speaker of the Texas House of Representatives (1927–1929), attorney general of Texas (1929–1930), state court judge (1935–1937), chairman of the Texas Highway Department (1937–1943)
- Jack Brooks – U.S. member of Congress; chair of United States House Committee on the Judiciary; authored articles of impeachment against President Nixon
- William Brownfield – assistant secretary of state for International Narcotics and Law Enforcement Affairs; former U.S. ambassador to Colombia; former U.S. ambassador to Venezuela; former U.S. ambassador to Chile
- James P. Buchanan – U.S. member of Congress; chair of the United States House Committee on Appropriations; after his death in office, succeeded by Lyndon B. Johnson
- Albert S. Burleson – United States postmaster general under President Woodrow Wilson and former member of Congress; instrumental in implementing Wilson's policy to racially segregate the federal workforce; aggressively enforced the Espionage Act during World War I
- George P. Bush – son of Florida Governor Jeb Bush, nephew of President George W. Bush; Texas land commissioner, elected 2014
- Waggoner Carr – attorney general of Texas
- John Carter – member of Congress
- James W. Cicconi – White House staff secretary; general counsel and worldwide head of government relations for AT&T
- Tom C. Clark – former associate justice of the Supreme Court of the United States and United States attorney general
- Susan Combs – Texas comptroller of public accounts; agriculture commissioner of Texas
- John Connally – former governor of Texas; former secretary of the Navy, former secretary of the treasury; aide to Lyndon Johnson; led Democrats for Nixon; former candidate for president of the United States; seriously wounded when riding in President Kennedy's car at Dealey Plaza when the president was assassinated; presided over the removal of the U.S. dollar from the gold standard; led a major expansion of higher education in Texas; opened previously all-male Texas A&M University to women
- Tom Connally – former United States senator; chair of Senate Foreign Relations Committee during World War II and the beginning of the Cold War; vice-chairman of United Nations Conference on International Organization that chartered the United Nations; Instrumental in ratification of treaty creating the North Atlantic Treaty Organization; strong supporter of free trade and foreign policy of President Franklin D. Roosevelt and President Harry S. Truman
- Christi Craddick – chair of the Texas Railroad Commission (the agency that has primary regulatory authority over the Texas oil and gas industry)
- Henry Cuellar – U.S. representative from Texas; member of House Democratic leadership
- Lloyd Doggett – member, U.S. Congress; former justice of the Texas Supreme Court
- Ronnie Earle – district attorney of Travis County (Austin) 1977–2009; indicted House Majority Leader Tom Delay for money laundering
- Robert C. Eckhardt – member of Congress; member of Texas House; author of Texas Open Beaches Act
- Frances Tarlton "Sissy" Farenthold – member of Texas House of Representatives; first female officeholder nominated for vice president of the United States at the 1972 Democratic National Convention
- Pete Geren – former member of Congress; former secretary of the Army; former secretary of the Air Force
- Thomas Watt Gregory – former attorney general of the United States; namesake of UT Austin Gregory Gym
- Kent Hance – chancellor emeritus of Texas Tech University System; former member of Congress who defeated George W Bush in his first congressional race
- Jeb Hensarling – member of US Congress; chair of the United States House Committee on Financial Services; chairman of House Republican Conference; chairman of US debt "Supercommittee"
- John Hill – former attorney general of Texas; former chief justice of Texas Supreme Court; Democratic nominee for governor of Texas in 1978
- Oveta Culp Hobby – first U.S. secretary of health and human services; second woman to serve as a member of the President's Cabinet
- Thad Hutcheson – former chairman of the Texas Republican Party, U.S. Senate candidate in 1957, Houston lawyer
- Kay Bailey Hutchison – U.S. permanent representative to NATO; former U.S. senator; ranking Republican United States Senate Committee on Commerce, Science, and Transportation
- Beauford Jester – governor of Texas
- Nathan M. Johnson – Texas state senator for District 16; Dragon Ball Z composer
- John Marvin Jones – member of Congress; chair of United States House Committee on Agriculture; chief judge of United States Court of Claims; author of many New Deal agriculture laws
- Joe M. Kilgore – 1946 graduate; U.S. representative from Texas's 15th congressional district 1955–1965
- Ron Kirk – former mayor of Dallas, Texas; former United States trade representative
- Cyndi Taylor Krier (Class of 1975) – Texas state senator and Bexar County judge; first woman and first Republican to represent San Antonio in the Texas State Senate
- Bob Lanier – former mayor of Houston
- Brooke Lierman – comptroller of Maryland
- Michael Lind – prolific political writer; has written and edited for Politico, Salon, New Republic, The New Yorker; co-founder of centrist think tank the New America Foundation
- Eddie Lucio, III – state representative from Texas' 38th District (Cameron County)
- George H. Mahon – member of US Congress; chair of U.S. House Appropriations Committee; dean of the United States House of Representatives
- Garry Mauro – commissioner of the Texas General Land Office; Democratic nominee for governor of Texas in 1998
- Earle Bradford Mayfield – former United States senator from Texas
- Myra McDaniel – first African American Texas secretary of state; general counsel to Governor Mark White
- Harry McPherson – White House Counsel; advisor to President Lyndon Johnson; assistant secretary of state for educational and cultural affairs
- John T. Montford (Class of 1968) – former chancellor of Texas Tech University System, 1996–2001; member of the Texas State Senate, 1983–1996; businessman in San Antonio since 2001
- Dan Moody – former governor of Texas; former Texas attorney general
- William T. "Bill" Moore – 1949 graduate; state senator from Bryan known as the "Bull of the Brazos" and the "father of the modern Texas A&M University"
- Steve Munisteri – White House deputy assistant to President Donald Trump; former chair of the Republican Party of Texas
- Pat Morris Neff – former governor of Texas; former president of Baylor University
- Covey T. Oliver – former assistant secretary of state for inter-American affairs; former U.S. ambassador to Colombia; former dean of University of Pennsylvania School of Law
- Pete Olson – U.S. congressman from Texas
- George Peddy (1920) – member of the Texas House of Representatives and U.S. Senate candidate
- Federico Peña – former secretary of transportation and secretary of energy; former mayor of Denver
- Colonel Alfred P.C. Petsch (1887–1981) – lawyer, legislator, civic leader, philanthropist, member of Texas House of Representatives
- Paul Pressler – lawyer, judge, and leader of the Southern Baptist Convention Conservative resurgence
- Sam Rayburn – longest-serving speaker of the United States House of Representatives; mentor to President Lyndon Johnson; chair of United States House Committee on Energy and Commerce; before Congress, served as speaker of Texas House of Representatives
- Brooke Rollins – special assistant to President Donald Trump for innovation; former CEO of the Texas Public Policy Foundation; former policy director for Governor Rick Perry
- Chip Roy – member of Congress
- Tom Schieffer – former U.S. ambassador to Japan; former U.S. ambassador to Australia; president of the Texas Rangers baseball team; co-led effort to purchase Texas Rangers with President George W. Bush; brother of CBS anchor Bob Schieffer
- A. R. Schwartz – former Texas state senator, helped write the landmark Texas Open Beaches Act
- Clay Sell – former United States deputy secretary of energy
- Reuben E. Senterfitt, speaker of the Texas House of Representatives 1951–1955
- John Sheppard – former attorney general of Texas
- Morris Sheppard – U.S. senator, author of the Eighteenth Amendment; chair of Senate Armed Services Committee; Senate Minority Whip
- Max Sherman (Class of 1960) – former state senator, former president of West Texas A&M University, former dean of the Lyndon B. Johnson School of Public Affairs
- Robert Allan Shivers – former governor of Texas; former lieutenant governor of Texas
- Kristen Silverberg – U.S. ambassador to the European Union; former assistant secretary of state for international organization affairs
- Shelby Slawson – state representative from District 59
- Barry Smitherman – former member of the Texas Railroad Commission
- Marc Stanley – U.S. ambassador to Argentina
- John Thomas Steen Jr. – San Antonio lawyer and the 108th Secretary of State of Texas
- Robert Schwarz Strauss – former U.S. ambassador to Russia; former United States trade representative; United States special envoy for the Middle East; former chair of the Democratic National Committee; founder of international law firm Akin Gump Strauss Hauer & Feld; namesake of Robert S. Strauss Center for International Security and Law at the University of Texas at Austin; recipient of the Presidential Medal of Freedom
- Bryan Taylor – member of Alabama State Senate; general counsel to Alabama Governor Kay Ivey
- Larry E. Temple – White House Counsel advisor to President Lyndon Johnson; chair of the LBJ Foundation
- Albert Thomas – member of Congress; chair of US House Democratic Caucus
- R. Ewing Thomason – former federal judge, United States District Court for the Western District of Texas; member of Congress; speaker of the Texas House of Representatives; mayor of El Paso
- Mac Thornberry – U.S. representative from Texas's 13th congressional district; chair of United States House Committee on Armed Services
- Jim Turner – former United States representative; ranking Democrat on House Homeland Security Committee
- Filemon Vela Jr. – United States representative from Texas
- Jason Villalba – state representative from District 114 in north Dallas County
- Bob Wheeler – Texas House of Representatives
- Bill White – former mayor of the City of Houston; former United States deputy secretary of energy; Democratic nominee for governor of Texas in 2010
- Ralph Yarborough – former United States senator from Texas; former chair, United States Senate Committee on Health, Education, Labor, and Pensions
- John Andrew Young – former United States representative from Texas

== Law ==
- Linda L. Addison – managing partner, New York, Fulbright & Jaworski L.L.P.
- Micaela Alvarez – federal judge, Southern District of Texas
- Lisa Blatt – holds the record for most cases argued by a woman in front of the Supreme Court (40, as of 2020); partner at Williams & Connolly
- David Briones – federal judge, Western District of Texas
- William C. Bryson – U.S. circuit judge, U.S. Court of Appeals for the Federal Circuit; former Solicitor General of the United States
- Greg Coleman – first solicitor general of Texas; founder of appellate firm Yetter Coleman LLP
- William C. Conner (1920–2009) – federal judge for the United States District Court for the Southern District of New York
- Elizabeth Ann Copeland – judge of the US Tax Court
- Gregg Costa – judge of the United States Court of Appeals for the Fifth Circuit; former assistant US attorney who led prosecution of famous Ponzi schemer Allen Stanford
- James DeAnda – chief judge of United States District Court for the Southern District of Texas; co-founded Texas RioGrande Legal Aid; plaintiff's attorney in US Supreme Court case of Hernandez v Texas
- Dick DeGuerin – criminal defense attorney based in Houston; clients include David Koresh and Tom DeLay
- James A. Elkins – founder of international energy law firm Vinson & Elkins
- Joseph Jefferson Fisher – U.S. district court judge for the Eastern District of Texas
- David Frederick – appellate attorney; has argued 37 cases before the United States Supreme Court; name partner in elite Washington DC litigation boutique Kellogg, Hansen, Todd, Figel & Frederick
- William Royal Furgeson Jr. – U.S. district court judge for the Western District of Texas; founding dean of University of North Texas at Dallas College of Law
- Gustavo C. Garcia, Carlos Cadena, James DeAnda – attorneys for 1950s civil rights case Hernandez v. Texas which determined that Hispanics have equal protection under the 14th Amendment
- Orlando Luis Garcia – U.S. district judge, Western District of Texas
- Bryan Garner – editor in chief of Black's Law Dictionary and author of numerous books and articles on language and writing, including A Dictionary of Modern Legal Usage
- Emilio M. Garza – judge, United States Court of Appeals for the Fifth Circuit
- Reynaldo Guerra Garza – judge, United States Court of Appeals for the Fifth Circuit; first Hispanic American appointed to a judgeship on any United States Court of Appeals
- Mike Godwin – first attorney for the Electronic Frontier Foundation and current general counsel for the Wikimedia Foundation
- Yvonne Gonzalez Rogers – judge of the United States District Court for the Northern District of California
- Joe R. Greenhill – chief justice of the Supreme Court of Texas
- Hayden W. Head, Jr. – chief judge, United States District Court for the Southern District of Texas
- Robert Scott Horton – human rights attorney, columnist for Harper's, and adjunct professor at Columbia Law School
- Joseph Chappell Hutcheson Jr. – judge, United States Court of Appeals for the Fifth Circuit
- Joe Jamail – billionaire trial lawyer known as the "King of Torts"; won $11 billion verdict representing Pennzoil against Texaco in oral contract case
- Edith Jones – chief justice of the Fifth Circuit Court of Appeals
- William Wayne Justice – senior United States district judge, Western District of Texas, United States district judge, Eastern District of Texas, storied civil rights judge
- Matthew J. Kacsmaryk – United States district judge of the U.S. District Court for the Northern District of Texas
- George P. Kazen – senior United States district judge, Southern District of Texas
- Michael Keasler – judge of the Texas Court of Criminal Appeals since 1999
- Royce C. Lamberth – chief judge United States District Court for the District of Columbia
- Debra Lehrmann – former 360th District Court judge in Fort Worth; Texas Supreme Court justice (2011– )
- Mike McKool – trial lawyer; founder of litigation firm McKool Smith; has won over $1 billion in judgments and verdicts; represented Quincy Jones in his lawsuit against the estate of Michael Jackson over royalties for Off the Wall and "Thriller"
- Thomas M. Melsheimer – Dallas managing principal for Fish & Richardson; 1986 magna cum laude graduate
- Harriet Mitchell Murphy – first African-American woman appointed to regular judgeship in Texas
- Jose Rolando Olvera Jr. – federal judge, United States District Court for the Southern District of Texas
- Edwin B. Parker (1868–1929) – lawyer of Houston, member of the War Industries Board and arbiter with Germany, Austria and Hungary following World War I
- James Aubrey Parker – federal judge, United States District Court for the District of New Mexico
- Robert L. Pitman – United States district judge of the United States District Court for the Western District of Texas; former United States Attorney for the Western District of Texas; first openly LBGT US attorney and federal judge in Texas
- Jack Pope (1913–) – lawyer, judge, and Supreme Court of Texas chief; justice 1982–1985
- Edward C. Prado – U.S. ambassador to Argentina; judge of the United States Court of Appeals for the Fifth Circuit
- Nelva Ramos – federal judge, Southern District of Texas
- Eddie Rodriguez – member of the Texas House of Representatives
- Xavier Rodriguez – federal judge, United States District Court for the Western District of Texas; former member of Texas Supreme Court
- Diana Saldana – federal judge, Southern District of Texas
- Barefoot Sanders – chief judge, United States District Court for the Northern District of Texas; U.S. assistant attorney general; United States attorney; Democratic nominee for U.S. Senate in 1972
- Joseph Tyree Sneed III – U.S. deputy attorney general; judge, United States Court of Appeals for the Ninth Circuit; dean of Duke University School of Law; father of Carly Fiorina
- Jorge Antonio Solis – chief judge, United States District Court for the Northern District of Texas
- Leslie H. Southwick – judge, United States Court of Appeals for the Fifth Circuit
- Sam Sparks – federal judge, Western District of Texas
- Robert Schwarz Strauss – former U.S. ambassador to Russia; former United States trade representative; United States special envoy for the Middle East; former chair of the Democratic National Committee; founder of international law firm Akin Gump Strauss Hauer & Feld; namesake of Robert S. Strauss Center for International Security and Law at the University of Texas at Austin; recipient of the Presidential Medal of Freedom
- Stephen Susman (J.D. 1965) – plaintiff's attorney and founding partner of Susman Godfrey
- R. Ewing Thomason – former federal judge, United States District Court for the Western District of Texas; member of Congress; speaker of the Texas House of Representatives; mayor of El Paso
- Henry Wade – served as Dallas County district attorney for 30 years; handled the criminal investigation of the assassination of President Kennedy and Lee Harvey Oswald; defendant in Roe vs Wade
- Joseph M. Watt – chief justice of the Oklahoma Supreme Court
- Mikal Watts – Texas trial lawyer who has won over $3 billion in settlements for his clients
- Sarah Weddington – represented Jane Roe in the landmark Supreme Court case Roe v. Wade
- Harry Whittington – Texas attorney famous for getting shot by Dick Cheney in a hunting incident; professionally known for eminent domain cases
- Diane Pamela Wood – chief judge for the United States Court of Appeals for the Seventh Circuit, considered potential candidate for a seat on the Supreme Court during the Obama administration
- John Wood – federal district judge who was assassinated by mob hitman Charles Harrelson, father of actor Woody Harrelson

== Academia ==
- Leon A. Green – long-time dean at Northwestern University School of Law and professor at UT and at Yale Law School; authored pioneering works in tort law
- Frank Shelby Groner (1877–1943) – president of the College of Marshall
- Kent Hance – chancellor emeritus of Texas Tech University System; former member of Congress who defeated George W. Bush in his first congressional race
- Herbert Hovenkamp – professor of Law at the University of Pennsylvania Carey Law School; prolific author and expert in Antitrust law; member of the American Academy of Arts and Sciences
- W. Page Keeton – 1931 graduate and dean 1949–1974; expert in torts; grandfather of White House Press Secretary Scott McClellan
- Thomas Mengler – president of Saint Mary's University in San Antonio; former dean of the law school at University of St. Thomas; former dean at the University of Illinois College of Law
- John T. Montford (Class of 1968) – former chancellor of Texas Tech University System, 1996–2001; member of the Texas State Senate, 1983–1996; businessman in San Antonio since 2001
- Gene Nichol – law professor at the University of North Carolina; former professor and president of the College of William and Mary; former dean of the law schools at North Carolina and Colorado
- Covey T. Oliver – former assistant secretary of state for inter-American affairs; former U.S. ambassador to Colombia; former dean of University of Pennsylvania School of Law
- Joseph Tyree Sneed III – U.S. deputy attorney general; judge, United States Court of Appeals for the Ninth Circuit; dean of Duke University School of Law; father of Carly Fiorina

== Business ==
- Samuel T. Bledsoe – president of Atchison, Topeka and Santa Fe Railway 1933–1939
- Kimberly S. Bowers – former CEO and chairman of the board of CST Brands; named by Fortune Magazine as one of the 50 most powerful women in business
- William Frank Buckley Sr. – lawyer and oil speculator in Mexico and Venezuela; father of William F. Buckley Jr. and Senator James L. Buckley, grandfather of Christopher Buckley
- Adam Dell – partner at Goldman Sachs; head of Goldman Sachs personal app Marcus; former partner in leading Venture Capital firm Austin Ventures; brother of Michael Dell
- Belinda Johnson – chief operating officer of Airbnb
- Michael R. Levy – founder and publisher of Texas Monthly magazine
- J. Hugh Liedtke and Bill Liedtke – brothers who co-founded Zapata Petroleum Corporation with President George HW Bush; acquired South Penn Oil Company, which they renamed Pennzoil
- Oliver Luck – former NFL player; former executive with NFL Europa and the Houston Dynamo of Major League Soccer; former CEO and commissioner of the XFL (2020)
- Hugh "Skip" McGee III – former global head of investment banking at Lehman Brothers and Barclays
- Robert McGehee – former CEO of Progress Energy
- Clay Sell – CEO of X-energy; former president of Hunt Energy Horizons; former United States deputy secretary of energy

== Non-profit ==
- Kathryn S. Fuller – chair of the Ford Foundation, former president of the World Wildlife Fund
- Pete Geren – president of the Sid W. Richardson Foundation
- Father T. J. Martinez – founder of Cristo Rey Jesuit College Preparatory of Houston, a Jesuit high school exclusively dedicated to low-income students in Houston; inducted into Papal Knighthood Equestrian Order of the Holy Sepulchre
- Sam Simon – consumer advocate
- Darren Walker – president of the Ford Foundation
