= Kazen =

Kazen is a surname. Notable people with the surname include:

- Abraham Kazen (1919–1987), American politician from Texas
- George P. Kazen (1940–2021), American judge from Texas
- John A. Kazen (born 1964), American judge from Texas
- Yosef Yitzchak Kazen (1954–1998), American rabbi
