= One Manhattan West =

Skyscraper in Manhattan, New York

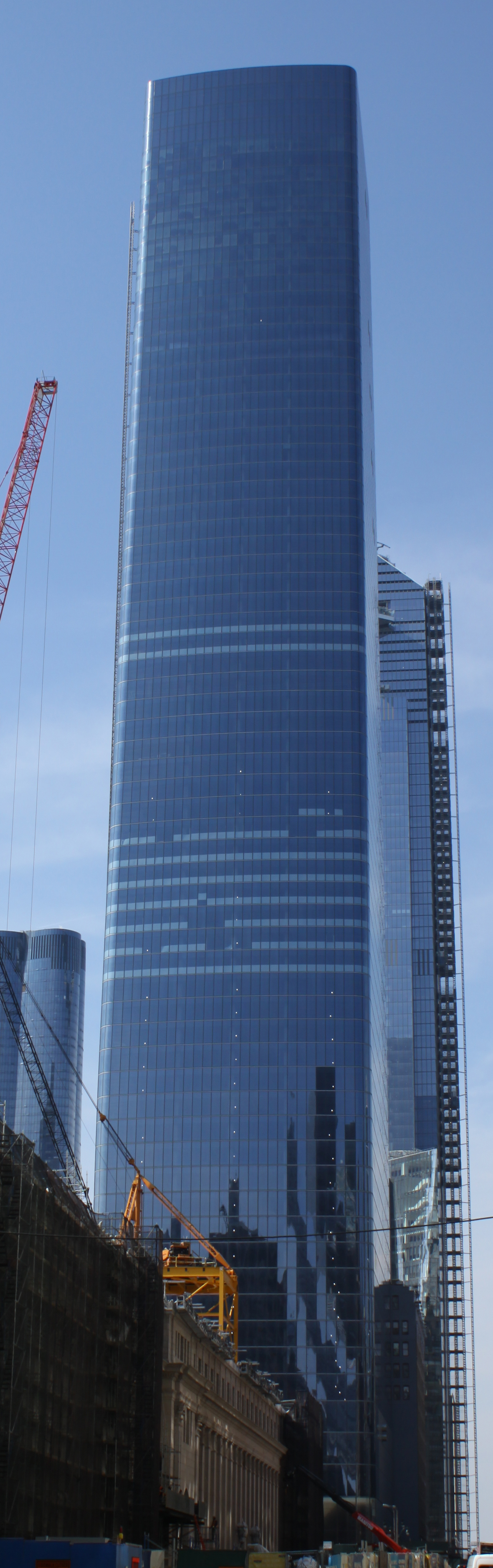
- Interactive map of the One Manhattan West area

General information
- Status: Completed
- Type: Office
- Architectural style: Modern and minimalist
- Location: 401 Ninth Avenue
- Coordinates: 40°45′10″N 73°59′52″W
- Completed: 2019
- Cost: $1.901 billion

Height
- Roof: 996 ft (304 m)

Technical details
- Floor count: 67
- Floor area: 171,000 m^{2} (1,840,600 sq ft)

Design and construction
- Architect: Skidmore, Owings and Merrill
- Structural engineer: Skidmore, Owings and Merrill
- Main contractor: Tishman Construction

Website
- manhattanwestnyc.com

One Manhattan West is a 67-story office skyscraper at 395 Ninth Avenue in the Manhattan West development on the West Side of Manhattan in New York City, United States. Designed by Skidmore, Owings & Merrill (SOM), it was completed in 2019 and is the second tower to be completed in the development after 3 Manhattan West. The tower is rectangular in plan, with a curtain wall that contains insulated glazing, as well as a reinforced-concrete mechanical core. Because One Manhattan West partially overhangs a set of railroad tracks, the mechanical core carries most of the building's structural loads.

One Manhattan West was built as part of the Manhattan West development, for which Brookfield Asset Management began acquiring land in the 1980s. Work on the building started in April 2015, after law firm Skadden, Arps, Slate, Meagher & Flom agreed to become the building's anchor tenant. One Manhattan West officially opened on October 30, 2019. As of 2022, a joint venture of Brookfield, the Qatar Investment Authority, and the Blackstone Group owns the building.

== Architecture ==
One Manhattan West, designed by Skidmore, Owings & Merrill, is 996 feet (304 m) tall. The building contains 67 usable stories, 2.1 million square feet (200×10^{3} m^{2}) and is anticipated to achieve LEED Gold certification. One Manhattan West is located at 395 Ninth Avenue on the West Side of Manhattan.

=== Form and facade ===
The tower is rectangular in plan. The north, south and west faces rise vertically up from the ground, while the east face bows out until the 19th floor and then tapers in uniformly to the roof. The curtain wall contains insulated glazing; according to SOM design director Kim Van Holsbeke, this was intended to give the impression that the building had been milled from stainless steel. Most of the facade uses flat panels, while the eastern facade uses curved panels between the fourth and 19th floors. All four corners of the facade have a rounded transition with a radius of 107 inches (2,720 mm).

At ground level, there is a lobby measuring approximately 45 feet (14 m) high. The perimeter of the lobby does not contain columns, as the building's central core carries all of the structural loads through the ground story. The lobby is instead surrounded by a transparent wall, which is held in place by glass fins.

=== Structural features ===
The structural system of the tower is composed of a central mechanical core of reinforced concrete and a perimeter steel moment frame. The walls of the mechanical core measure as much as 4 feet (1.2 m) thick. In addition, the building contains 75-foot-long (23 m) diagonal steel "kickers", which transfer loads from the core to the footings. Each kicker was manufactured in three pieces measuring 25 feet (7.6 m) long, allowing cranes to hoist them. Above the lobby, the building's structural system consists of steel floor slabs, which surround the core. Each story has a slab-to-slab height of 13.5 feet (4.1 m), and the office space on each story measures 42 feet (13 m) between the curtain wall and the core.

Part of the tower overhangs the subterranean railroad tracks leading into Penn Station. As such, the foundations cover only 30 percent of the site's area, and the southernmost 20 feet (6.1 m) of the lobby overhangs the railroad tracks. To avoid the tracks, the perimeter columns on the south, north, and east sides do not come down to ground level, but are transferred to the core above the building's lobby. Although the Manhattan West complex partially occupies a deck above the railroad tracks, the deck cannot support One Manhattan West's weight, so the core extends down to the bedrock just north of the tracks.

The core passes through the center of the lobby and is concealed by travertine walls. Near the lobby's ceiling, the core flares outward at a 45-degree angle. Stoneworkers used approximately 400 short tons (360 long tons; 360 t) of white Italian travertine in the lobby, and they used three CNC machines to carve the travertine. The elevator lobby, at the center of the mechanical core, is also clad with marble. The lobby also has black Canadian-stone floors and wood-paneled walls. The southern portion of the lobby contains a portion of a 240,000-square-foot (22,000 m^{2}) retail area and a food hall, both of which are shared with 5 Manhattan West.

== History ==
One Manhattan West was built as part of the Manhattan West development, for which Brookfield Asset Management began acquiring land in the 1980s. The project was first conceived in the 1990s, although a groundbreaking ceremony for the site did not occur until January 2013. At the time, the project was planned to include two office towers at One and Two Manhattan West, a residential building at Three Manhattan West, and a hotel at Four Manhattan West, as well as a renovation of the existing office building at Five Manhattan West. The Qatar Investment Authority (QIA) invested a 44 percent stake in the $4.5 billion mixed-use development project in October 2015.

Law firm Skadden, Arps, Slate, Meagher & Flom agreed to become the building's anchor tenant in April 2015, relocating from 4 Times Square to 550,000 square feet (51,000 m^{2}) at One Manhattan West. Brookfield decided to begin constructing One Manhattan West after Skadden Arps had signed the lease, even though the proposed building was only 25 percent leased, amid competition from the Related Companies' Hudson Yards development. The building reached its halfway point in October 2017, when the first glass panels were installed on the facade, and accounting firm Ernst & Young announced the next month that it would relocate to One Manhattan West. The National Hockey League, financial services firm JPMorgan Chase, law firm McKool Smith, and professional-services firm Accenture had also agreed to move into the building by mid-2018. Wells Fargo provided a $530 million construction loan for the project in July 2018. The structure topped out the next month, and the last "kicker" was installed that September.

One Manhattan West officially opened on October 30, 2019. At the time of its completion, One Manhattan West was more than 90 percent leased. In September 2021, Brookfield Asset Management placed a 49 percent stake in the building for sale. That December, Blackstone began negotiations to buy the 49-percent stake from Brookfield and QIA for approximately US$1.40 billion. This placed the building's value at US$2.85 billion. Brookfield and QIA finalized their sale of the 49 percent stake to Blackstone in March 2022.

== Reception ==
When One Manhattan West was completed, architectural critic Justin Davidson wrote of One and Two Manhattan West: "Two glass-skinned office skyscrapers flank the Ninth Avenue entrance, aspiring to an illusion of weightlessness, like a pair of elongated soap bubbles."

== Tenants ==
As of September 2019, the building was 86% leased:

- Floors 6-22, 48: Ernst & Young
- Floors 23-27: National Hockey League
- Floors 28-46: Skadden, Arps, Slate, Meagher & Flom LLP
- Floors 50-51: McKool Smith
- Floor 56: Pharo Management
- Floor 57: Wiz
- Floor 57: SAS Institute
- Floors 59-67: Accenture

== See also ==
- List of tallest buildings in New York City
