= Senate Bill 5 =

Senate Bill 5 may refer to:

- Ohio Senate Bill 5 Voter Referendum, Issue 2, proposed Ohio Collective Bargaining Limit Repeal in 2011
- Texas Senate Bill 5, an anti-abortion bill in the Texas State Senate filibustered by Wendy Davis
- Texas Senate Bill 5 (85th Legislature), a voter-ID bill
