= The Eugene =

Skyscraper in Manhattan, New York

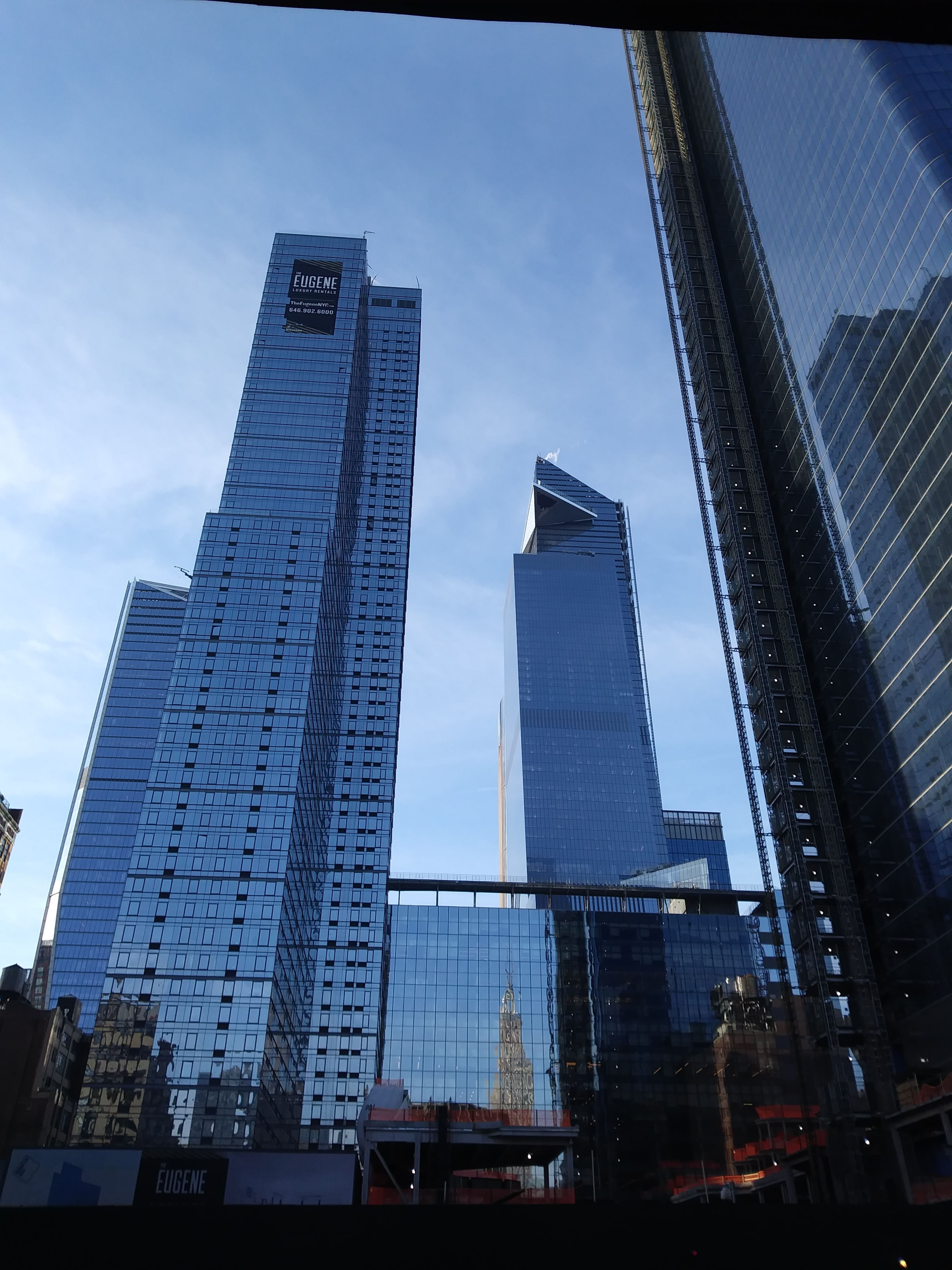
- The Eugene (left), alongside 30 Hudson Yards (center-right, background) and One Manhattan West (far-right, foreground)
- Interactive map of the The Eugene area

General information
- Status: Completed
- Type: Residential
- Location: 401 West 31st Street
- Coordinates: 40°45′08″N 73°59′56″W
- Construction started: December 2014
- Completed: July 2017
- Cost: $791 million

Height
- Roof: 730 ft (223 m)

Technical details
- Floor count: 64
- Floor area: 70,297 m^{2} (756,670 ft^{2})

Design and construction
- Architect: Skidmore, Owings and Merrill

The Eugene, located at 435 West 31st Street, is a residential tower that is part of the Manhattan West project, and broke ground in December 2014. In 2017, it was the tallest rental skyscraper in New York City. Now complete, it stands 64 floors and 730 feet (220 m) high. In total it has 844 units, split between 675 market-rate and 169 affordable. Among the building's amenities are La Palestra gym with a full-size basketball court and rock climbing wall, Bluestone Lane coffee shop, a rooftop terrace with a private bar, poker lounges, an arcade room, private piano rooms, an indoor golf simulation, a music studio, a library with study rooms, and a dog grooming station.
