= Ci Siamo =

Italian restaurant in New York, United States

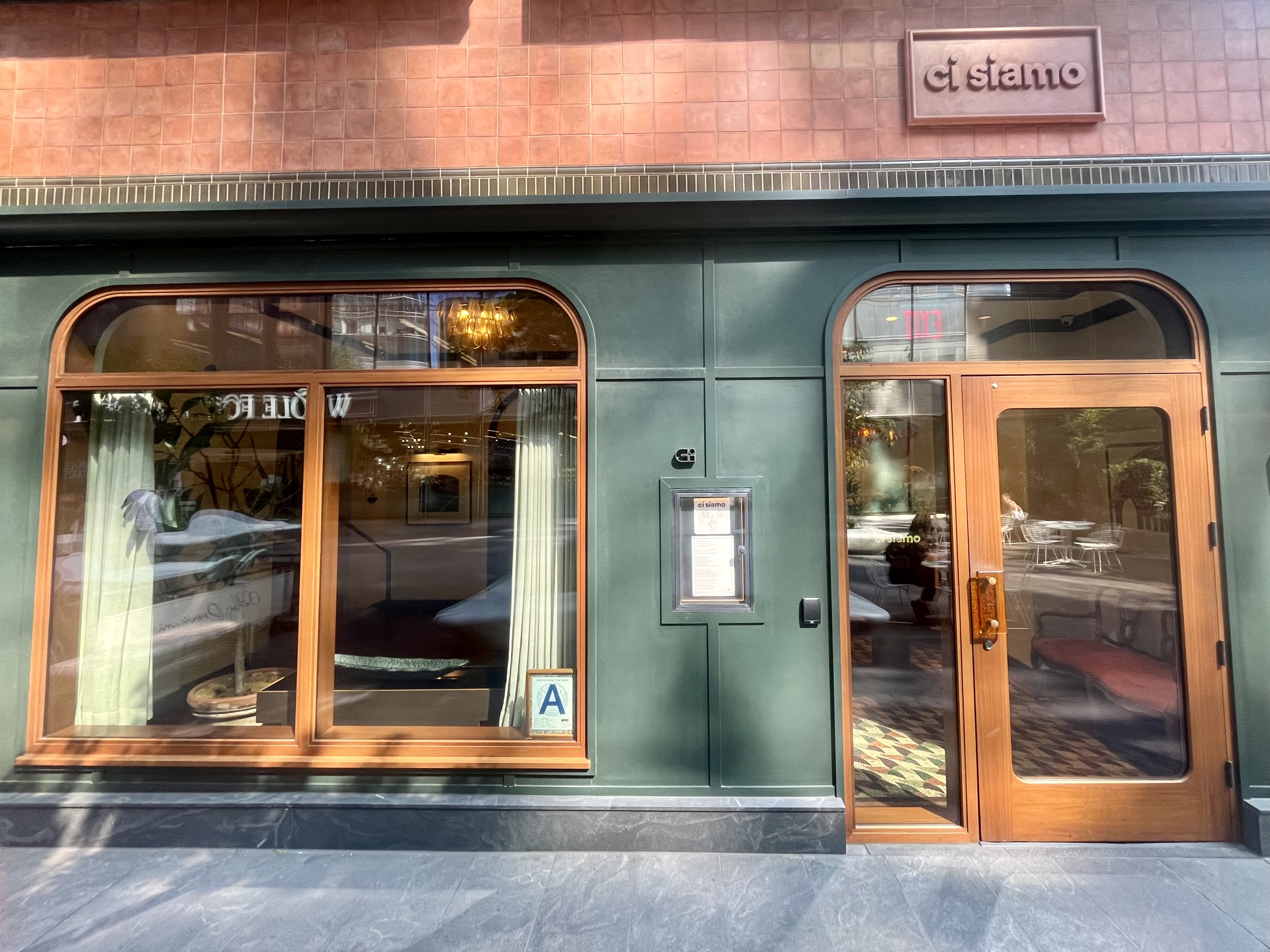
- The restaurant's exterior in 2024
- Interactive map of Ci Siamo

Restaurant information
- Established: October 12, 2021
- Food type: Italian
- Location: 440 West 33rd Street Suite 100, New York City, New York, 10001, United States
- Coordinates: 40°45′09″N 73°59′56″W
- Website: www.cisiamonyc.com

Ci Siamo is an Italian restaurant in New York City. It is located in Manhattan West.

== See also ==
- List of Italian restaurants
