= Owen DeVol Cox =

American judge (1910–1990)

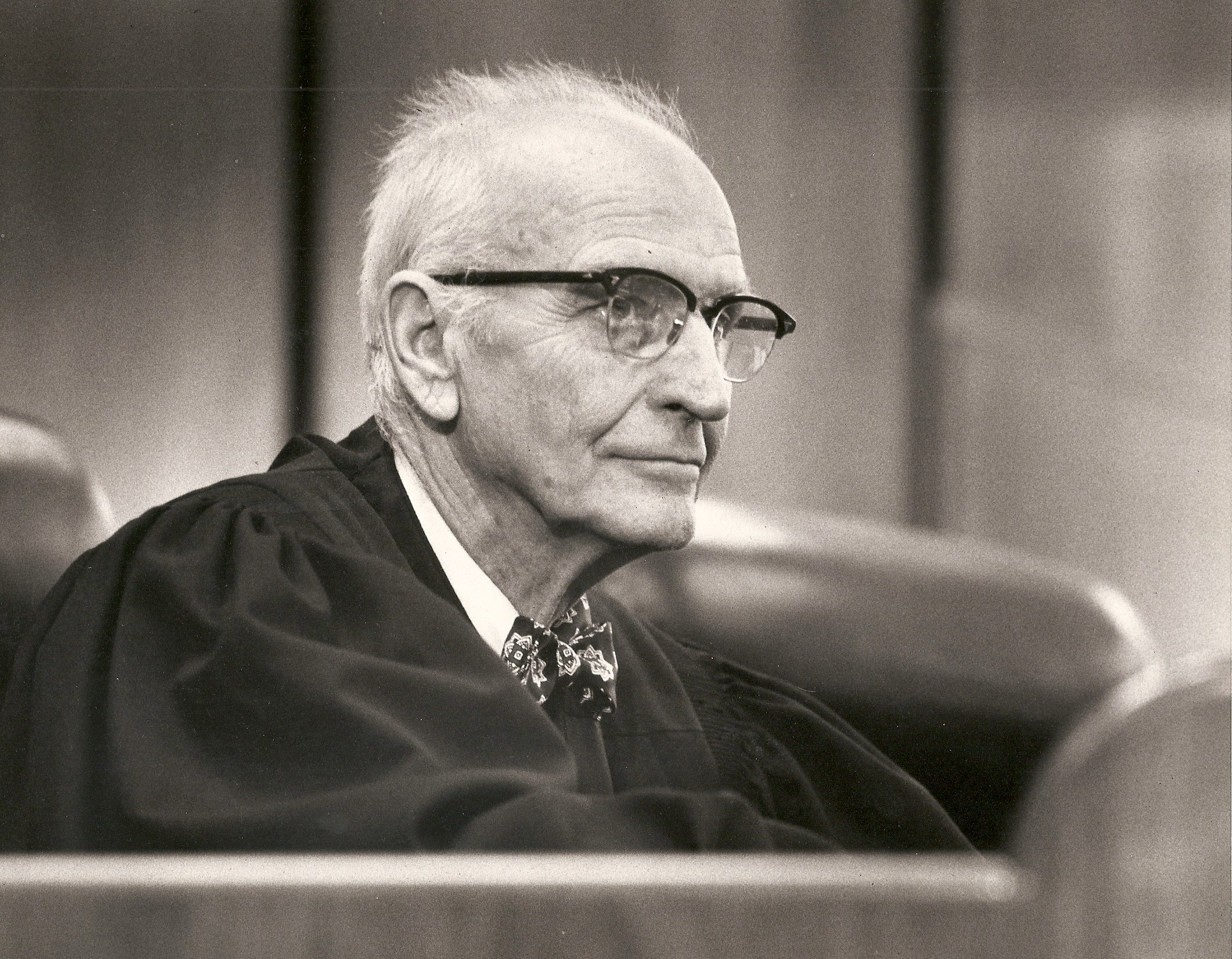

Senior Judge of the United States District Court for the Southern District of Texas
- In office March 20, 1981 – July 21, 1990

Judge of the United States District Court for the Southern District of Texas
- In office December 1, 1970 – March 20, 1981
- Appointed by: Richard Nixon
- Preceded by: Seat established by 84 Stat. 294
- Succeeded by: Hayden Wilson Head Jr.

Personal details
- Born: Owen DeVol Cox; March 20, 1910 Joplin, Missouri, U.S.
- Died: July 21, 1990 (aged 80) Corpus Christi, Texas, U.S.
- Education: University of Kansas (B.A.); University of Kansas School of Law (LL.B.)

Owen DeVol Cox (March 20, 1910 – July 21, 1990) was a United States district judge of the United States District Court for the Southern District of Texas.

== Education and career ==
Born on March 20, 1910, in Joplin, Missouri, Cox received a Bachelor of Arts degree from the University of Kansas in 1931 and a Bachelor of Laws from the University of Kansas School of Law in 1932. He was in private practice in Corpus Christi, Texas from 1934 to 1942. He was an assistant city attorney of Corpus Christi in 1942, and an assistant state attorney general of Texas in the same year, becoming city attorney of Corpus Christi from 1943 to 1944. He was in the United States Army during the later years of World War II, from March 1944 to November 1945, and became a staff sergeant. He was again city attorney of Corpus Christi from 1945 to 1946, thereafter returning to his private practice there until 1970.

== Federal judicial service ==
On October 7, 1970, Cox was nominated by President Richard Nixon to a new seat on the United States District Court for the Southern District of Texas, which was created by 84 Stat. 294. He was confirmed by the United States Senate on November 25, 1970, and received his commission on December 1, 1970. He assumed senior status on March 20, 1981. Cox served in that capacity until his death on July 21, 1990, in Corpus Christi.

== Sources ==
Legal offices
Preceded by Seat established by 84 Stat. 294	Judge of the United States District Court for the Southern District of Texas; 1970–1981	Succeeded by Hayden Wilson Head Jr.
