= Texas Senate Bill 5 (85th Legislature) =

Texas Senate Bill 5 (SB 5) is a bill that implements a form of voter identification law in the state of Texas. It is a revamped version of a previous Texas voter ID law (SB 14) that was introduced in 2011.

SB 5 was filed on February 21, 2017 during the regular session of the eighty-fifth Texas Legislature. The bill passed the Texas Senate with a 21-10 vote, and it passed the Texas House of Representatives with a 92-56 vote with 1 present, not voting. Governor Greg Abbott signed the bill on June 1, 2017, and it became effective January 1, 2018.

== Bill content ==
Texas Senate Bill 5 requires voters to present an acceptable form of photo ID before casting a ballot at the polls. There are currently 7 acceptable forms of ID:

1. Texas Driver License
2. Texas Election Identification Certificate
3. Texas Personal Identification Card
4. Texas Handgun License
5. U.S. Military Identification Card (with a photograph of the voter)
6. U.S. Citizenship Certificate (with a photograph of the voter)
7. U.S. Passport

For voters between the ages of 18 and 69, the above ID’s cannot be expired for more than 4 years. For voters aged over 70, any of the above valid ID’s can be expired for more than 4 years.

Under the bill, voters who do not possess any of the seven forms of ID and are unable to obtain one through reasonable means may vote if they complete a Reasonable Impediment Declaration and show one of the following supporting forms of ID:

1. Copy of/original government document with name and address of voter and voter registration certificate
2. Copy of/original current utility bill
3. Copy of/original bank statement
4. Copy of/original government check
5. Copy of/original paycheck
6. Copy of/original of a certified domestic birth certificate
7. Copy of/ original document that confirms the voter's identity and birth (a foreign birth certificate would apply).

== Legal Challenges ==
As previously mentioned, Senate Bill 5 is a reformulated version of Senate Bill 14. Initially, SB 14 was taken down by Circuit Judge Tatel from the District of Columbia in the case of Texas v. Holder, 2012. In the case, Texas failed to prove that Senate Bill 14 would not have any negative consequences on racial minorities during voting, resulting in the U.S Attorney General denying preclearance needed according to Section 5 of the Voting Rights Act. However, in 2013 the coverage formula on section 4(b) of the Voting Rights Act was deemed unconstitutional in Shelby County v. Holder. Therefore, the preclearance block of SB 14 in 2012 was no longer valid, meaning that the law was finally in effect. It was only in 2017 that SB 14 was once more ruled against by both the U.S. 5th Circuit Court of Appeals and Judge Ramos for its discriminatory impact. On August 23, 2017, U.S. District Judge Nelva Gonzales Ramos ruled that Texas Senate Bill 5 failed to sufficiently reform the discriminatory effect the original voter ID law (SB 14) had on Hispanic and black voters. This decision by Judge Ramos was appealed by the State of Texas. The U.S. 5th Circuit Court of Appeals heard the case on December 5, 2017 and ultimately reversed Ramos' ruling. On December 8, 2017, the Appellate Court upheld SB 5 in a 2-1 decision on the grounds that intentional discrimination cannot be traced from SB 14 to the newly revised SB 5 without a new legal challenge directed specifically at SB 5.

== See also ==
- Voter ID laws in the United States
- Shelby County v. Holder
- Voting Rights Act of 1965
