= Vanessa Gilmore =

American judge (born 1956)

Vanessa Diane Gilmore
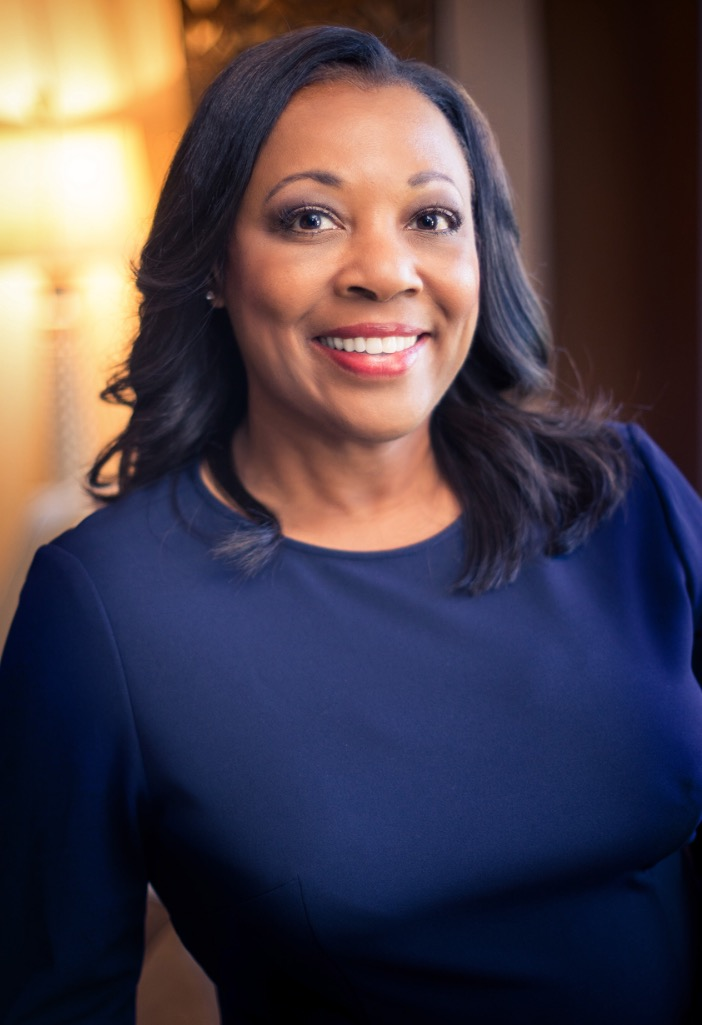

Judge of the United States District Court for the Southern District of Texas
- In office June 9, 1994 – January 2, 2022
- Appointed by: Bill Clinton
- Preceded by: Seat established by 104 Stat. 5089
- Succeeded by: John A. Kazen

Personal details
- Born: October 26, 1956 (age 69) St. Albans, New York, U.S.
- Education: Hampton University (BS); University of Houston Law Center (JD)

Vanessa Diane Gilmore (born October 26, 1956) is a former United States district judge of the United States District Court for the Southern District of Texas. She was appointed to this position by President Bill Clinton in 1994. At that time, she was the youngest sitting federal judge in the United States. She was also the first graduate of the University of Houston to be appointed to the federal bench.

== Education and career ==
Gilmore was born in St. Albans, New York, and raised in Silver Spring, Maryland. She earned her Bachelor of Science from Hampton University in 1977, and received her Juris Doctor from the University of Houston Law Center in 1981. Upon graduation in 1981, Gilmore began a 13-year tenure at the Houston, Texas, law firm of Vickery, Kilbride, Gilmore and Vickery where she specialized in civil litigation. Gilmore also became an active member of the Houston civic community, serving on the boards of a number of civic and charitable organizations. She also became involved in the Texas political arena while serving as counsel and teacher in the area of election law. She worked as an adjunct professor at the University of Houston College of Law teaching research and writing in 1984.

Her civic activities outside of the courtroom brought her to the attention of Governor Ann Richards, who in 1991 appointed Gilmore to the Texas Department of Commerce Policy Board, where she also served as chairperson from 1992 to 1994. Her appointment to that board made Gilmore the first African-American to serve on this board responsible for increasing business and tourism and job training development in Texas. In 1993, she also served as chairperson of Texans for NAFTA (the North American Free Trade Agreement). In this capacity, she worked regularly with diplomatic leaders, including the President of Mexico, to increase U.S. trade opportunities.

After more than 27 years of federal judicial service, Gilmore began work as a mediator and arbitrator with JAMS and also serves as of counsel to the Roberts Markland law firm. She is the owner of Tea With Judge V, a tearoom on the historic Riverside Drive in Houston.

== Federal judicial service ==
On March 22, 1994, Gilmore was nominated by President Clinton to a new seat on the United States District Court for the Southern District of Texas created by 104 Stat. 5089. She was confirmed by the United States Senate on June 8, 1994, and received her commission the following day. In 2005 she presided over the Enron Broadband trial and over the environmental case relating to the building of the Galveston cruise ship terminal. Gilmore retired on January 2, 2022.

== Writings ==
Motivated in part by her own experiences as an adoptive mother, she decided to write about adoption. Her novel, Saving the Dream, tells the story of a young woman and her decision to have her baby or give it up for adoption and alternately explores the life her son might have lived in each world.

Her book, Lynn's Angels - The True Story of E. Lynn Harris and the Women Who Loved Him tells the story of the life of the late author E. Lynn Harris and the five women who comprised the family that he invented for himself that he called "Lynn's Angels". It explores the universal concept of voluntary kinship with the goal of helping others appreciate the significance of their own invented families. She is also the co-author of a children's book entitled "A Boy Named Rocky: A Coloring Book for the Children of Incarcerated Parents" and is a frequent speaker and lecturer on issues related to these children and their families. She has assisted with and instituted initiatives to help these families with access to resources for their children, including the development of a legal clinic at Texas Southern University. Her book, "You Can't Make This Stuff Up: Tales From a Judicial Diva", is an autobiographical look at her life on and off the bench.

== Personal life ==
Gilmore is mother of Sean Harrison Gilmore, an entrepreneur and graduate of American University. She is the recipient of numerous civic awards for community service and served as president of the YWCA of Houston and as a member of the Board of Trustees for Hampton University for seventeen years. A golfer, she also served on the board of First Tee of Houston. Gilmore currently serves on the board of Trustees of Texas Children’s Hospital, the board of trustees of the DePelchin Children’s Center, the board of visitors of MD Anderson Cancer Center, the board of trustees of the Kinder Institute for Urban Research and as a member of the Contemporary Arts Committee of the Museum of Fine Arts Houston.

== See also ==
- List of African-American federal judges
- List of African-American jurists

Legal offices
Preceded by Seat established by 104 Stat. 5089	Judge of the United States District Court for the Southern District of Texas; 1994–2022	Succeeded by John A. Kazen
