= John A. Kazen =

American judge (born 1964)

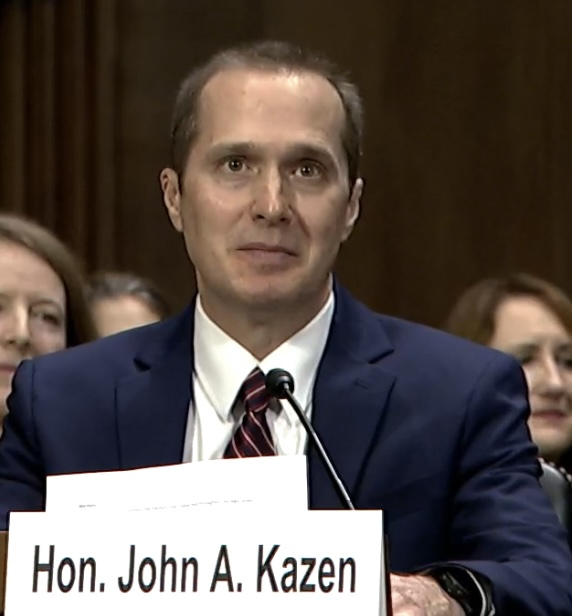

Judge of the United States District Court for the Southern District of Texas
- Incumbent
- Assumed office January 12, 2024
- Appointed by: Joe Biden
- Preceded by: Vanessa Gilmore

Magistrate Judge of the United States District Court for the Southern District of Texas
- In office June 13, 2018 – January 12, 2024

Personal details
- Born: John Andrew Kazen; 1964 (age 61–62) Lincoln, Nebraska, U.S.
- Parent: George P. Kazen (father)
- Education: University of Texas at Austin (BA); University of Houston (JD)

John Andrew Kazen (born 1964) is an American lawyer from Texas who has served as a United States district judge of the United States District Court for the Southern District of Texas since 2024. He previously served as a United States magistrate judge of the same court from 2018 to 2024.

== Education ==
Kazen received a Bachelor of Arts from the University of Texas at Austin in 1987 and a Juris Doctor from the University of Houston Law Center in 1990.

== Career ==
From 1990 to 1991, Kazen served as a law clerk for Judge Robert Manley Parker of the United States District Court for the Eastern District of Texas. From 1991 to 1997, he was a civil litigator at Kemp, Smith, Duncan, & Hammond, P.C. in El Paso. From 1997 to 2018, he was a partner at the law firm he established, Kazen, Meurer, & Pérez, L.L.P. in Laredo.

=== Federal judicial service ===
Kazen was appointed as a United States magistrate judge on June 13, 2018, and sworn in by Judge Diana Saldaña on the same day.

On August 30, 2023, President Joe Biden announced his intent to nominate Kazen to serve as a United States district judge of the United States District Court for the Southern District of Texas. Kazen was recommended as a district judge by Senators John Cornyn and Ted Cruz. On September 11, 2023, his nomination was sent to the Senate. President Biden nominated Kazen to the seat vacated by Judge Vanessa Gilmore, who retired on January 2, 2022. On October 4, 2023, a hearing on his nomination was held before the Senate Judiciary Committee. On October 26, 2023, his nomination was reported out of committee by a voice vote. On January 8, 2024, the United States Senate invoked cloture on his nomination by a 73–15 vote. On January 9, 2024, his nomination was confirmed by an 83–14 vote. He received his judicial commission on January 12, 2024, and he was sworn in by Judge Saldaña on the same day.

== Personal life ==
Kazen is the son of former Judge George P. Kazen who served on the Southern District from 1979 to 2018.

Legal offices
Preceded by Vanessa Gilmore	Judge of the United States District Court for the Southern District of Texas; 2024–present	Incumbent
