= Belinda Johnson =

American attorney and businessperson

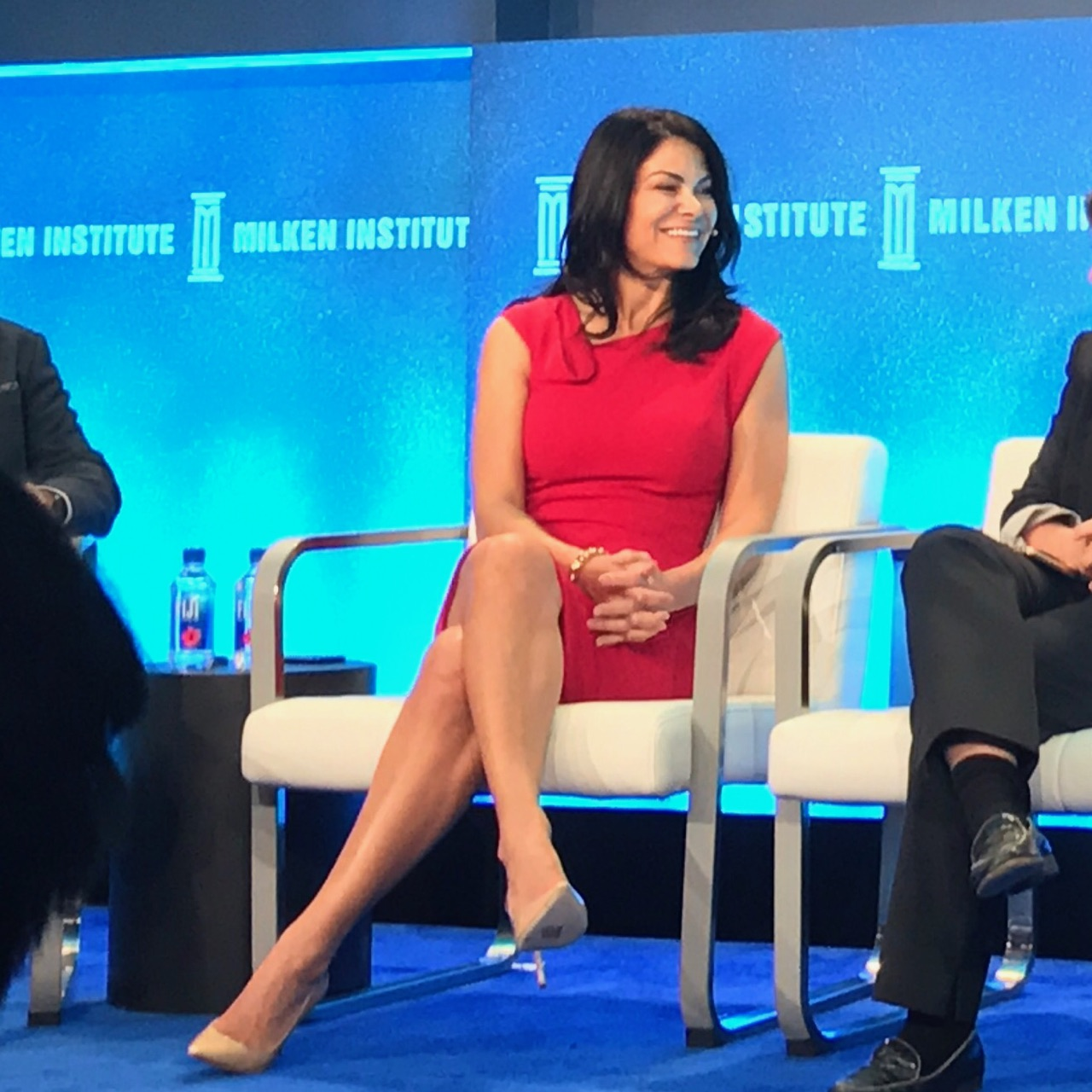
- Born: 1967 (age 58–59)
- Education: University of Texas (BA, JD)
- Occupations: Lawyer and executive
- Years active: 1991-current

Belinda Johnson is an American attorney and business executive. She currently serves on the boards of Airbnb and PayPal.

== Career ==
Johnson earned her undergraduate and law degrees from the University of Texas at Austin. After graduating from law school in 1991, she spent several years working for law firms in the Dallas area. In 1996, Johnson was hired by the internet radio streaming company AudioNet (Broadcast.com) as general counsel and a secretary.

In 1999, Broadcast.com was purchased by Yahoo! and Johnson moved to the San Francisco Bay Area to be general counsel for Yahoo.

== Airbnb ==
In 2011, Johnson left Yahoo and joined Airbnb as the company's general counsel. She rose to the role of chief business affairs and legal officer, then chief operating officer.

=== Resignation ===
In December 2019, Johnson announced she would be stepping down from her position as COO on March 1, 2020, but will become a board member at Airbnb. She served on the board of directors at PayPal since January 2017 and Airbnb since March 2020

== Honors ==
In 2016, Johnson was one of the 107 people in the Fast Company's Most Creative People in Business List. She was listed as the 96th most powerful woman in the Forbes’ 100 Most Powerful Women in 2017, and 69th in 2018.

== Personal life ==
Johnson lives with her husband, Brent Johnson, a writer and former lawyer, and their two children in Redwood City, California.
