= Texas Open Beaches Act =

Law establishing public access to beaches in Texas, United States

The Texas Open Beaches Act is a U.S. state of Texas law, passed in 1959 and amended in 1991, which guarantees free public access to beaches on the Gulf of Mexico:

The public... shall have the free and unrestricted right of ingress and egress to and from the state-owned beaches bordering on the seaward shore of the Gulf of Mexico ... extending from the line of mean low tide to the line of vegetation bordering on the Gulf of Mexico.

After major storms, Texas GLO guidelines indicate that beachfront residents may not rebuild their homes due to the act such as some Galveston homes affected by Hurricane Alicia in 1983. Additionally, repairs may only be made in certain circumstances, and then only on structures above the mean high-tide line.

Ongoing litigation continues to clarify the effect of the act on beachfront property owners. The Texas Supreme Court has made it clear that once acquired, public easements do not "roll" when the mean high-tide line changes due to an avulsive event such as a hurricane. The state will own the "wet beach" (any land seaward of the mean-high-tide line), but the "dry beach" (beach that is landward of the mean-high-tide line, but seaward of the vegetation line) may be privately owned, regardless of any pre-existing easements on the beach prior to the avulsive event. However, an easement will "roll" with the vegetation line as long as its movement is gradual/natural and not caused by an avulsive event like a hurricane. Some have criticized the court's decision based on the fact that hurricanes result in "natural" erosion; critics argue that the distinction between what is "avulsive" and what is "gradual" is unclear.

== See also ==
- Public trust doctrine
