= Hayden Wilson Head Jr. =

American judge (born 1944)

Senior Judge of the United States District Court for the Southern District of Texas
- Incumbent
- Assumed office November 13, 2009

Chief Judge of the United States District Court for the Southern District of Texas
- In office 2003–2009
- Preceded by: George P. Kazen
- Succeeded by: Ricardo Hinojosa

Judge of the United States District Court for the Southern District of Texas
- In office October 26, 1981 – November 13, 2009
- Appointed by: Ronald Reagan
- Preceded by: Owen DeVol Cox
- Succeeded by: Nelva Gonzales Ramos

Personal details
- Born: November 12, 1944 (age 81) Sherman, Texas, U.S.
- Education: University of Texas (BA, JD)

Hayden Wilson Head Jr. (born November 12, 1944) is an inactive senior United States district judge of the United States District Court for the Southern District of Texas.

== Education and career ==
Born in Sherman, Texas, Head received a Bachelor of Arts degree from the University of Texas in 1966 and a Bachelor of Laws from the University of Texas School of Law in 1968. He was in private practice in Corpus Christi, Texas from 1968 to 1969. He joined the United States Navy from 1969 to 1972 and served in the Judge Advocate General's Corps. He was in private practice in Corpus Christi from 1972 to 1981.

=== Federal judicial service ===
Head was nominated by President Ronald Reagan on September 17, 1981, to a seat on the United States District Court for the Southern District of Texas vacated by Judge Owen DeVol Cox. He was confirmed by the United States Senate on October 21, 1981, and received his commission on October 26, 1981. He served as Chief Judge from 2003 to 2009. He assumed senior status on November 13, 2009, and inactive senior status on June 1, 2018.

=== Notable case ===
In 2014, Head entered the news for vacating an order by United States Magistrate Judge Brian Owsley to unseal the records of government requests for electronic surveillance in connection with criminal investigations. As a result of his order, the surveillance, most of which are for investigations that have long been concluded, along with the government's legal justification for the surveillance, remains secret. The one-paragraph order offered no explanation for the decision and was itself filed under seal.

== Sources ==
Legal offices
Preceded by Owen DeVol Cox	Judge of the United States District Court for the Southern District of Texas; 1981–2009	Succeeded by Nelva Gonzales Ramos
Preceded by George P. Kazen	Chief Judge of the United States District Court for the Southern District of Texas; 2003–2009	Succeeded by Ricardo Hinojosa
