= Mike McKool =

American trial lawyer

- Education: University of Notre Dame, University of Texas School of Law
- Occupation: Lawyer
- Organization: McKool Smith
- Spouse: Erin McKool

Mike McKool is an American trial lawyer. He is co-founder and chairman of law firm McKool Smith. He represented music producer Quincy Jones in a legal battle against Michael Jackson's estate in 2017. McKool has tried more than 100 cases to juries, resulting in verdicts and judgments of more than $1 billion.

== Early life and education ==
His father, Mike McKool Sr., was a Lebanese immigrant and trial lawyer. McKool attended trials with his father throughout his childhood. He attended Dallas' Jesuit High School and was student body president.

McKool studied at the University of Notre Dame, where he majored in anthropology and graduated magna cum laude. In 1974, he graduated from the University of Texas School of Law.

== Career ==
After graduating, McKool joined law firm Hewett Johnson Swanson & Barbee, later called Johnson & Gibbs. He became head of litigation for the firm until he left in 1991 to form his own law firm.

McKool co-founded McKool Smith with Phillip N. Smith, Jr. of Baker Botts in Dallas in August 1991 and became chairman of the organization. In 2001, McKool opened a second office in Austin, Texas, followed by offices in New York City and Washington, D.C. in 2007, a Houston office in 2009, and offices in Los Angeles and Silicon Valley in 2011.

In 2012, McKool received the Trial Lawyer of the Year award from the Dallas Bar Association. Texas Lawyer recognized McKool with a Lifetime Achievement Award in 2014.

McKool represented Versata in a patent case against SAP in 2013. McKool also represented Alcoa Inc. against North Carolina in 2015 over land rights concerning four hydropower dams along the Yadkin River. The court ruled that Alcoa had been in continuous possession of the property since 1962.

In 2017, McKool represented producer Quincy Jones in a case against Michael Jackson's estate. Jones' original case in 2013 focused on Sony Entertainment and MJJ Productions, claiming master records were wrongfully edited and remixed to avoid paying him royalties. Jones signed two agreements with Jackson in 1978 and 1985, stating that Jones would have the first opportunity to remix any of the works he produced. After Jackson's death in 2009, Jones's royalty payments did not increase despite the increased interest in Jackson's music. Jones was awarded $9.4 million by the jury.

McKool is a fellow of the American College of Trial Lawyers. He was recognized with a Lifetime Achievement award by Benchmark Litigation in 2017.
