= Manhattan West =

Building complex in New York City

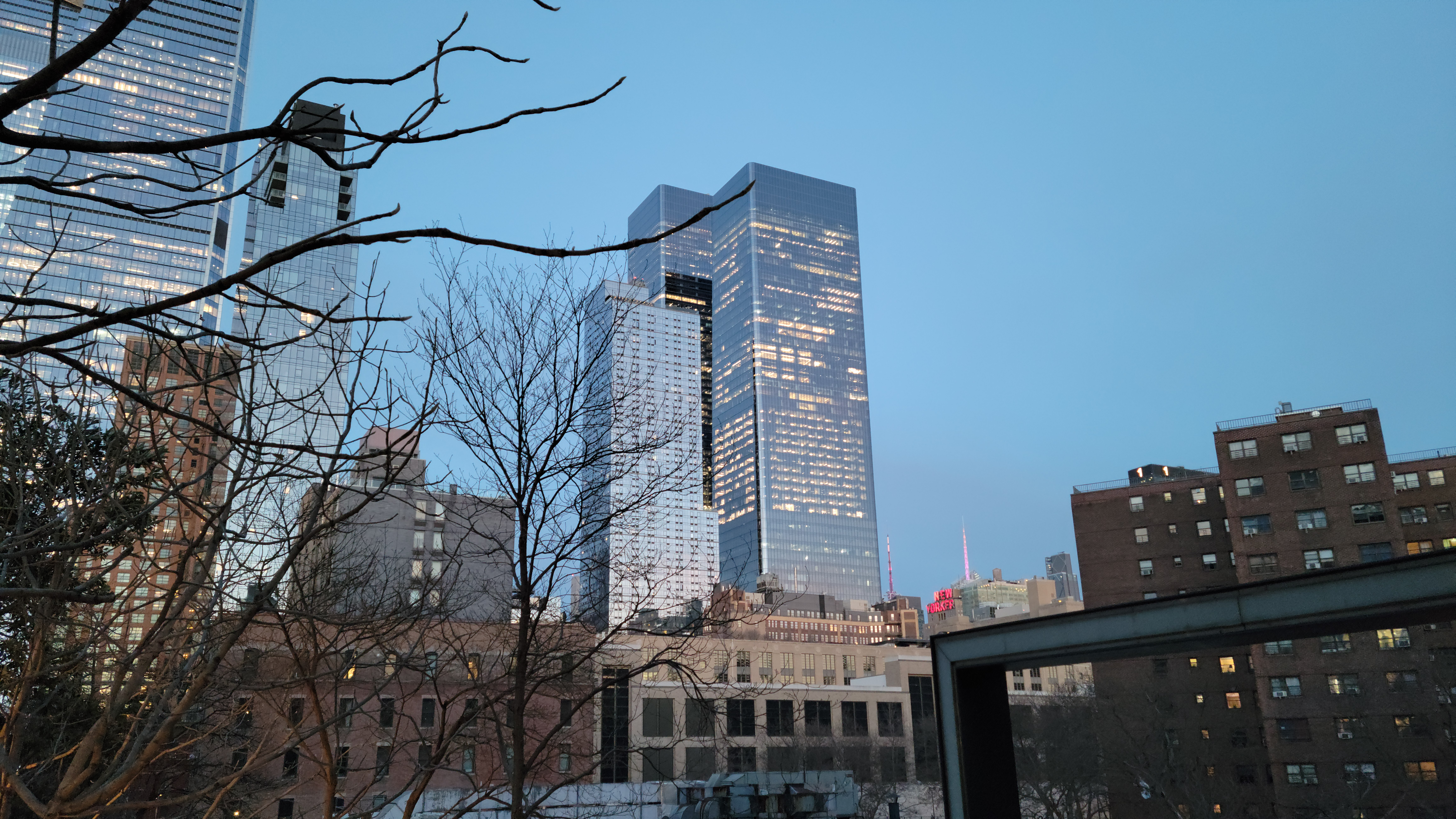
- Manhattan West (center), seen from the High Line
- Interactive map of the Manhattan West area

General information
- Status: Mostly complete
- Location: New York City
- Coordinates: 40.7519°N 73.9979°W
- Groundbreaking: January 13, 2013
- Construction started: One Manhattan West: 2015; Two Manhattan West: 2019; The Eugene: 2014; Pendry Manhattan West: December 2018
- Completed: One Manhattan West: 2019; Two Manhattan West: 2022; The Eugene: 2017; Pendry Manhattan West: September 2021; Five Manhattan West: 1969; 2017 (renovated); The Lofts: 1913; 2019 (renovated)
- Owner: Brookfield Properties
Other information
Technical details
Floor count	One Manhattan West: 67 floors; Two Manhattan West: 58 floors; The Eugene: 62 floors; Pendry Manhattan West: 21 floors; Five Manhattan West: 16 floors
Design and construction
Architects	One Manhattan West: SOM; Two Manhattan West: SOM; The Eugene: SLCE Architects and SOM; Pendry Manhattan West: SOM; Five Manhattan West: Davis Brody Bond and Joshua Ramus of Rex Architects (renovation)
Website
manhattanwestnyc.com

Manhattan West is a 7-million-square-foot (650,000 m^{2}) mixed-use development by Brookfield Properties, built as part of the Hudson Yards Redevelopment. The project spans 8 acres and features four office towers, one boutique hotel, one residential building, 225,000 square feet (20,900 m^{2}) of retail space and a 2.5-acre (1 hectare) public plaza. The project was built on a platform over Penn Station storage tracks along Ninth Avenue between 32nd and 33rd Streets.

The project is bordered by Tenth Avenue and the Hudson Yards mega-development to the west and Ninth Avenue and the Moynihan Train Hall to the east. The taller North tower (One Manhattan West) extends 995 feet (303 m). The project was largely completed in 2021, and held its grand opening on September 28, 2021.

== History ==
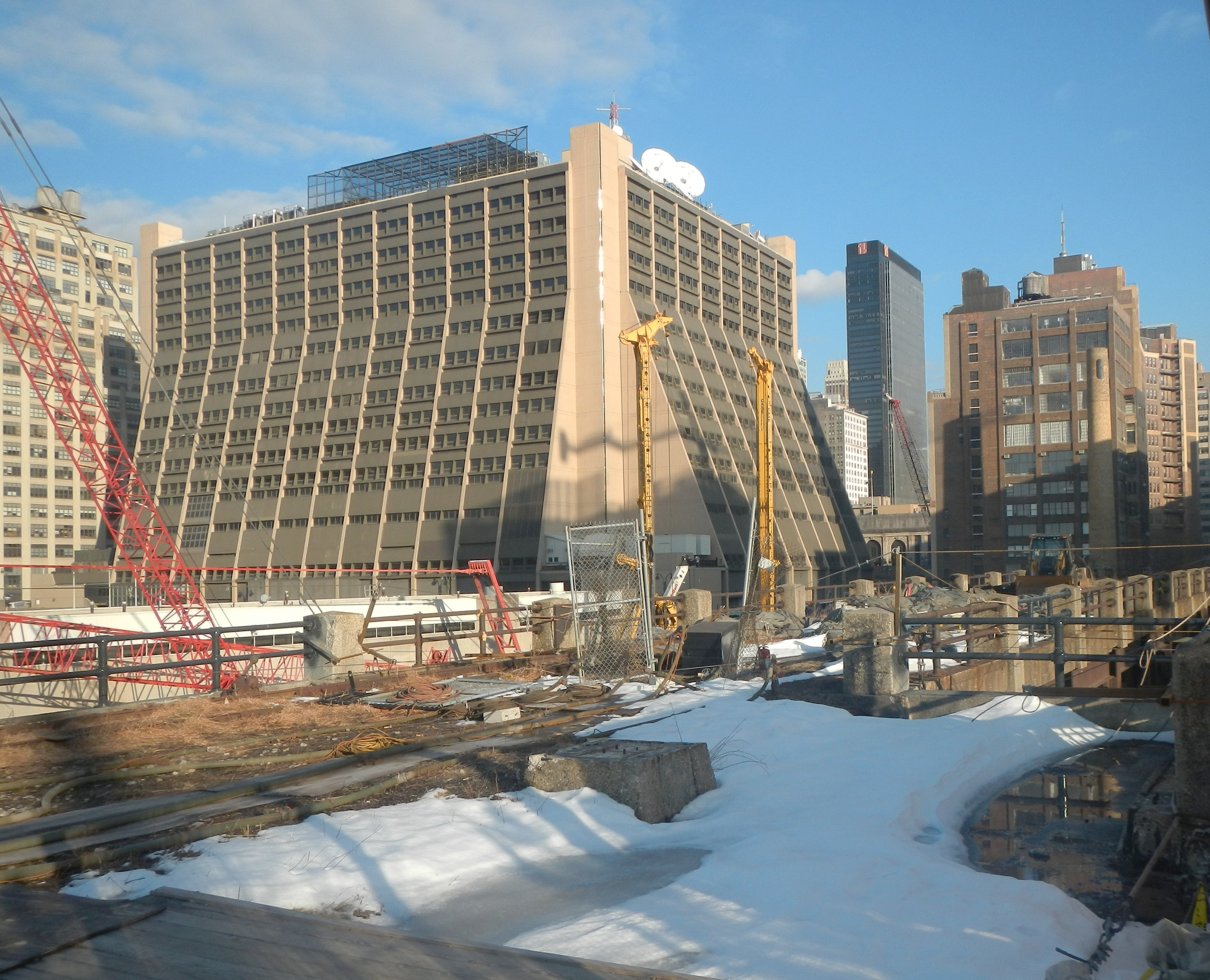
The initial appearance of 450 West 33rd Street

First conceived as a project in the 1990s, ground was broken for the site in January 2013. In May 2014, permits for complex were submitted and approved. Under the updated 2014 plan, the complex was set to be completed by 2020. By the end of 2014, a $680 million platform over train tracks leading into Penn Station between Tenth and Dyer Avenues, atop which the Manhattan West development would be built, was completed.

In October 2015, the Qatar Investment Authority invested a 44% stake in the $4.5 billion mixed-use development project. The deal included the formation of a joint venture between Brookfield Property Partners and QIA for the development of 7 million square feet (650,000 m^{2}) of residential and office space in five buildings that Brookfield said would be worth $8.6 billion upon completion. Initial plans included a 62-story residential tower and 67-story skyscraper. In 2017, plans for an additional, 59-story skyscraper were filed.

Manhattan West is part of the Hudson Yards Redevelopment, a larger plan to redevelop the Hudson Yards area, which extends from the west of Pennsylvania Station to the Hudson River.

During the summer of 2020, Manhattan West opened Citrovia, an outdoor garden of 16.5-foot (5.0 m) constructed lemon trees bearing hand-painted lemon slices—to obscure the scaffolding on the construction site. The interactive display is no longer available to visit and is currently being deconstructed upon the completion of the second tower.

Manhattan West officially opened to the public in late September 2021.

In September 2021, a $50 million plan to build pedestrian bridges connecting the High Line and Manhattan West was announced by New York Governor Kathy Hochul and Brookfield Properties. Groundbreaking for the approximately 1000-foot extension, called the Moynihan Connector, took place on February 24, 2022. This project will connect the High Line to Moynihan Train Hall through Manhattan West.

In October 2025, Brookfield announced plans to convert part of Four Manhattan West, a building at 424 West 33rd Street, to residential use. The building predates the Manhattan West development, having been completed in 1913.

== Site and structures ==
The development is located on the west side of Manhattan, bound by Ninth Avenue in the east, Tenth Avenue in the west, 31st Street in the south, and 33rd Street in the north. It abuts Moynihan Train Hall and Hudson Yards. The project consists of six buildings: four office buildings, One and Two Manhattan West, the Lofts and Five Manhattan West; the Pendry Manhattan West Hotel; and the Eugene apartment building. It also includes Magnolia Court, a 2.5-acre pedestrian plaza, which is open to the public.

=== One Manhattan West ===
One Manhattan West is one of five buildings developed by Brookfield Property Partners and QIA for the Manhattan West project. Designed and engineered by Skidmore, Owings & Merrill, the building broke ground in 2015.

The structural system of the tower is composed of a central reinforced concrete core and a perimeter steel moment frame. Part of the tower overhangs the below ground train tracks leading into Penn Station. In order to avoid the tracks, the perimeter columns on the south, north, and east sides do not come down to ground level, but are transferred to the core above the building's lobby. Skidmore, Owings & Merrill also served as the lead structural engineer on the building, the 15th-tallest in New York City as of November 2022, while Jaros, Baum & Bolles was the MEP engineer and AECOM Tishman Construction was the primary contractor.

The 67-story, 2.1 million square-foot structure topped out in August 2018 and was completed in 2019.

Placed outside One and Two Manhattan West, Charles Ray's sculpture Adam and Eve (2023) consists of two larger-than life figures made of stainless steel blocks.

=== Two Manhattan West ===
Two Manhattan West, also designed and engineered by Skidmore, Owings & Merrill, was completed in January 2024. Permits filed in November 2017 showed the building to include just under 1.75 million square feet (163,000 m2) of office space on 59-stories with plans to reach 935 feet (285 m) in height. Construction began at the end of 2019. In 2022, the building topped out at 58 stories with 2 million square feet.

Installed in the lobby of Two Manhattan West, Christopher Wool's Crosstown Traffic (2023) measures 28ft by 39ft and is both his first mosaic as well as his largest work of art.

Law firm Cravath, Swaine & Moore announced in October 2019 that it would occupy thirteen floors at Two Manhattan West, solidifying its place as the anchor tenant. In August 2022, global accounting firm KPMG announced that it intended to move its U.S. headquarters to the building in 2025. Totaling 456,000 square feet, the space KPMG will occupy represents a 40% decline in space currently leased by the firm in Midtown. In September 2022, investment and technology development firm D. E. Shaw & Co. agreed to occupy eight floors in the building beginning in 2024.

=== The Eugene ===
The Eugene, previously known as Three Manhattan West, located at 435 West 31st Street, is a 64-story residential building that broke ground in December 2014 and was completed in 2017. It is 730 feet (220 m) high and has a total of 844 apartments, divided between 675 market-rate units and 169 affordable units.

=== Pendry Manhattan West ===
The Pendry is a 21-story hotel operated by Pendry Hotels and Resorts with 164 guest rooms including 30 suites, a restaurant, a lounge, an open-air terrace bar, and meeting and event space. The building, also designed by Skidmore Owings & Merrill, began construction in December 2018 and opened on September 17, 2021. It is the Pendry brand's first New York City location.

=== Five Manhattan West ===
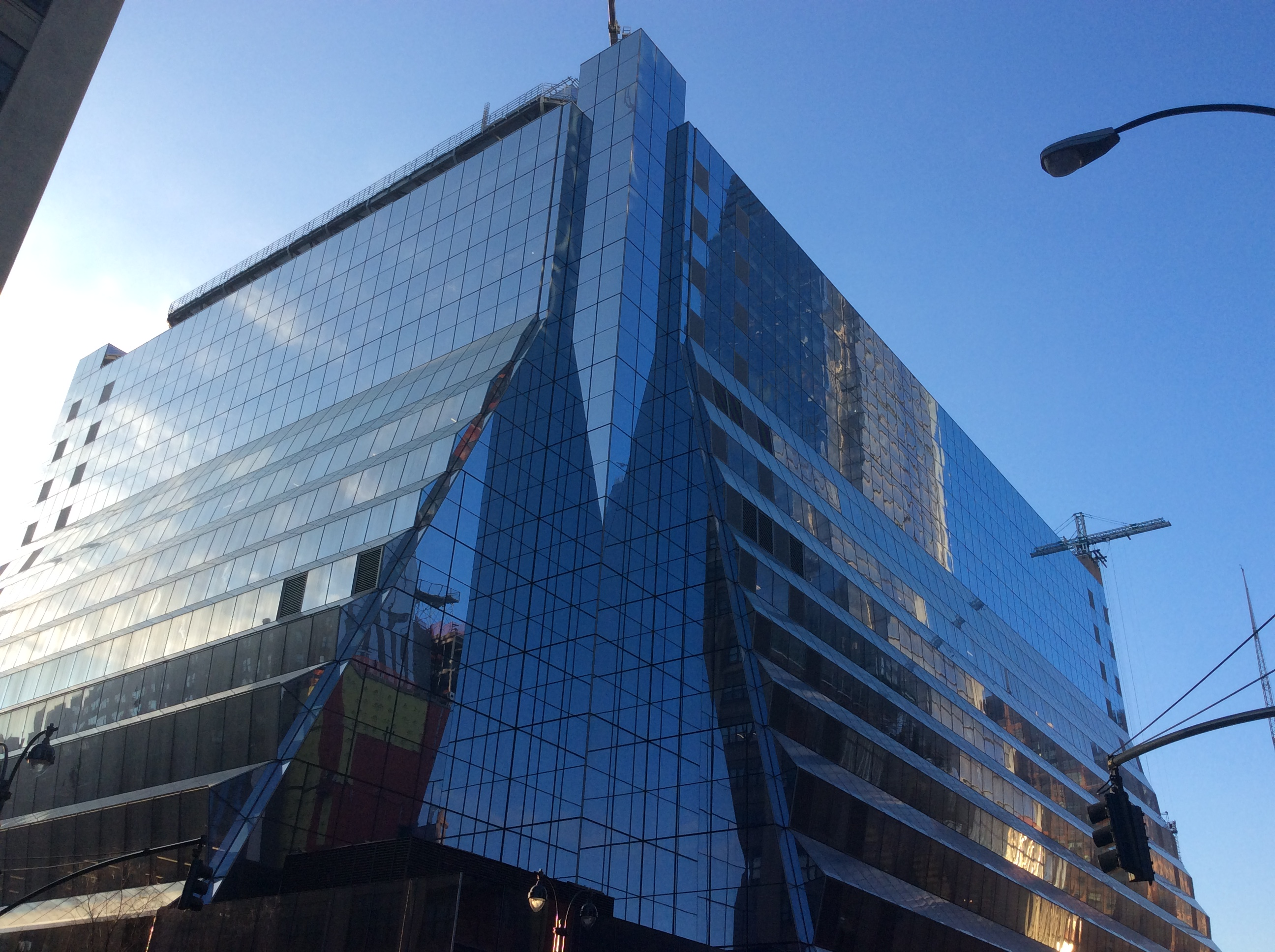
Five Manhattan West as seen in 2017

Formerly known as Westyard Distribution Center, the building at 450 West 33rd Street was designed by Davis Brody Bond and originally opened in 1969. The 1.8-million-square-foot (170,000 m^{2}), 16-story building originally had a beige precast concrete facade with a sloped base, which was seen as out of place with the architecture of the surrounding neighborhood. As of 2014, it contained the headquarters of the Associated Press. In 2014, the brutalist concrete exterior was replaced with a glass facade by Rex Architects. Its interior and mechanical systems were also renovated. When renovation of the building was completed, it was renamed Five Manhattan West. The building's tenants include Amazon's marketing division, Whole Foods Market, and Peloton Interactive's studio.

=== The Lofts ===
As part of the project, a building constructed in 1913 on 33rd Street was redesigned as a flexible workspace and office space.

== Additional tenants ==
By October 2019, when One Manhattan West opened, the tower had reached 90% occupancy. Current tenants include the law firm Skadden Arps, Slate, Meagher, & Flom, LLP, Ernst & Young, McKool Smith, Accenture, W. P. Carey, and Pharo Management. Additionally, the National Hockey League has its headquarters and flagship retail store in the building. In October 2019, the law firm Cravath, Swaine & Moore signed for space in Two Manhattan West, intending to move its headquarters to the building and occupy 13 floors. The firm was to move to the building in 2024.

Manhattan West also rents space to a variety of entertainment, dining, and shopping venues. These include Casa Dani, Ci Siamo, Zou Zou's, Peachy, Public Rec, OPR Eyewear, New Stand, and a Daily Provisions location.

== Reception ==
Justin Davidson, in an article about the development's opening for New York, compared Manhattan West favorably to Hudson Yards, writing that the Brookfield development "[...] feels like a corner of New York conceived with actual human beings in mind" while Hudson Yards "[...] has aged from a shiny new space station to a disconsolate one".

== See also ==
- List of tallest buildings in New York City
