= Diana Saldaña =

American judge (born 1971)

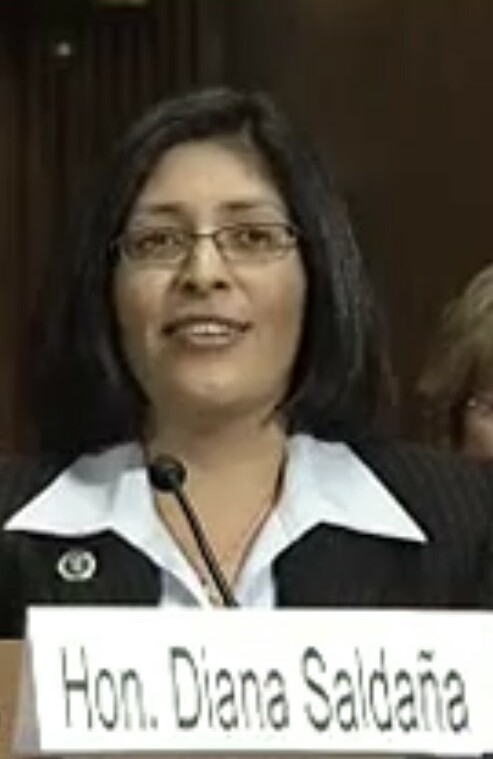

Judge of the United States District Court for the Southern District of Texas
- Incumbent
- Assumed office February 9, 2011
- Appointed by: Barack Obama
- Preceded by: George P. Kazen

Magistrate Judge of the United States District Court for the Southern District of Texas
- In office 2006–2011

Personal details
- Born: 1971 (age 54–55) Carrizo Springs, Texas, U.S.
- Education: University of Texas at Austin (BA, JD)

Diana S. Saldaña (born 1971) is a United States district judge of the United States District Court for the Southern District of Texas and a former United States magistrate judge of the same court.

== Biography ==
Saldaña was born in Carrizo Springs, Texas to Blanca Hernandez Rodriguez, a single mother. Beginning at the age of 10 and continuing through law school, Saldaña spent summers with her family as a seasonal farmworker in Minnesota and North Dakota. Saldaña received two Bachelor of Arts degrees from the University of Texas at Austin, the first in history in 1993 and the second in government in 1994. She then attended the University of Texas School of Law, where she was president of the Chicano/Hispanic Law Students Association. Saldaña earned her Juris Doctor from the University of Texas School of Law in 1997. After graduating law school, Saldaña served as law clerk for Judge George P. Kazen of the United States District Court for the Southern District of Texas.

=== Federal judicial service ===
In 2006, Saldaña was selected to serve as a United States magistrate judge for the United States District Court for the Southern District of Texas. She was sworn in on March 27, 2006.

During the 111th United States Congress, Democrats from the Texas House delegation and Republican Senators John Cornyn and Kay Bailey Hutchison agreed to recommend Saldaña for a Laredo vacancy on the Southern District of Texas. On July 14, 2010, President Barack Obama nominated Saldaña to replace George P. Kazen, for whom she previously clerked. On February 7, 2011, her nomination was confirmed by the Senate by a 94–0 vote. She received her commission on February 9, 2011.

== See also ==
- List of Hispanic and Latino American jurists

Legal offices
Preceded by George P. Kazen	Judge of the United States District Court for the Southern District of Texas; 2011–present	Incumbent
