= Nelva Gonzales Ramos =

American judge (born 1965)

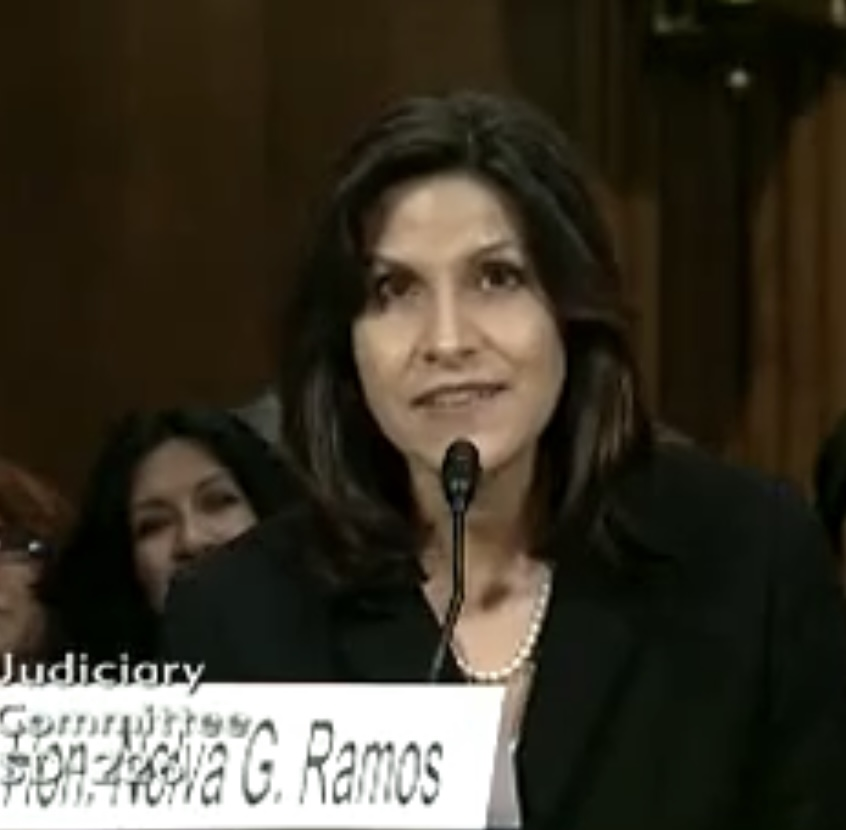

Judge of the United States District Court for the Southern District of Texas
- Incumbent
- Assumed office August 4, 2011
- Appointed by: Barack Obama
- Preceded by: Hayden Wilson Head Jr.

Personal details
- Born: August 22, 1965 (age 61) Port Lavaca, Texas, U.S.
- Party: Democratic
- Education: Texas State University–San Marcos (BA); University of Texas at Austin (JD)

Nelva Gonzales Ramos (born August 22, 1965) is a United States district judge of the United States District Court for the Southern District of Texas.

== Early life and education ==
Ramos was born in 1965 in Port Lavaca, Texas. She attended Texas State University, where she graduated with a Bachelor of Arts summa cum laude in 1987. Ramos then earned her Juris Doctor from the University of Texas School of Law in 1991.

== Career ==
Ramos was in private practice in Corpus Christi, Texas, from 1991 to 1997 and again during 1999 and 2000.

=== State judicial service ===
She served as a judge of the Corpus Christi Municipal Court from 1997 to 1999. From 2001 to 2011, Ramos served as a judge of the 347th District Court.

=== Federal judicial service ===
During the 111th Congress, Ramos was one of three candidates recommended by Democrats from the Texas House delegation for a Corpus Christi vacancy on the United States District Court for the Southern District of Texas. Ramos was the only candidate also supported by Republican Senators Kay Bailey Hutchison and John Cornyn. On January 26, 2011, President Barack Obama nominated Ramos to a seat vacated by Judge Hayden Wilson Head Jr. The United States Senate confirmed Ramos by unanimous consent on August 2, 2011. She received her commission on August 4, 2011.

=== Notable rulings ===
In August 2016, Ramos ruled in a case accusing the state of misleading voters without IDs. Ramos ruled that the U.S. Department of Justice alleged officials used news releases, a website and resources for training election officials to narrow "dramatically the scope of voters protected".

On April 10, 2017, Ramos ruled that Texas' voter ID law was passed in 2011 with the intent to discriminate against minority voters. On April 27, 2018, the United States Court of Appeals for the Fifth Circuit reversed Ramos' ruling, upholding the Texas voter ID law in a 2–1 vote.

== See also ==
- List of Hispanic and Latino American jurists

Legal offices
Preceded by Hayden Wilson Head Jr.	Judge of the United States District Court for the Southern District of Texas; 2011–present	Incumbent
