= George P. Kazen =

American judge (1940–2021)

Senior Judge of the United States District Court for the Southern District of Texas
- In office May 31, 2009 – March 9, 2018

Judge of the United States Foreign Intelligence Surveillance Court
- In office July 15, 2003 – May 18, 2010
- Appointed by: William Rehnquist
- Preceded by: William Henry Stafford Jr.
- Succeeded by: Martin Leach-Cross Feldman

Chief Judge of the United States District Court for the Southern District of Texas
- In office 1996–2003
- Preceded by: Norman William Black
- Succeeded by: Hayden Wilson Head Jr.

Judge of the United States District Court for the Southern District of Texas
- In office May 11, 1979 – May 31, 2009
- Appointed by: Jimmy Carter
- Preceded by: Seat established by 92 Stat. 1629
- Succeeded by: Diana Saldaña

Personal details
- Born: George Philip Kazen; February 29, 1940 Laredo, Texas, U.S.
- Died: April 27, 2021 (aged 81) Laredo, Texas, U.S.
- Party: Democratic
- Relatives: John A. Kazen (son)
- Education: University of Texas at Austin (BBA, JD)

George Philip Kazen (February 29, 1940 – April 27, 2021) was a United States district judge of the United States District Court for the Southern District of Texas from 1979 to 2018.

Born in Laredo, Texas, Kazen received a Bachelor of Business Administration from the University of Texas in 1960 and a Juris Doctor from the University of Texas School of Law in 1961. He was a briefing attorney for the Texas Supreme Court from 1961 to 1962, and was then a Captain in the U.S. Air Force, JAG Corps, from 1962 to 1965. He was in private practice in Laredo, Texas from 1965 to 1979.

On March 7, 1979, Kazen was nominated by President Jimmy Carter to a new seat on the United States District Court for the Southern District of Texas created by 92 Stat. 1629. He was confirmed by the United States Senate on May 10, 1979, and received his commission the following day. He served as chief judge from 1996 to 2003. He served as a judge of the Foreign Intelligence Surveillance Court from 2003 to 2010. He assumed senior status on May 31, 2009. Kazen was an adjunct professor of law at St. Mary's University Law School from 1990 to 2021. After his retirement in 2018, the federal courthouse in Laredo was renamed in his honor. He died on April 27, 2021, aged 81.

Kazen's uncle, Abraham Kazen, was a Democratic member of the United States House of Representatives from 1967 to 1985.

Shortly following his retirement in 2018, Kazen's son John was named as a magistrate judge of the Southern District of Texas. On August 30, 2023, President Joe Biden announced his intent to nominate Judge John A. Kazen to a full district judgeship on the same court.

Legal offices
| Preceded by Seat established by 92 Stat. 1629 | Judge of the United States District Court for the Southern District of Texas; 1979–2009 | Succeeded by Diana Saldaña |
| Preceded by Norman William Black | Chief Judge of the United States District Court for the Southern District of Texas; 1996–2003 | Succeeded by Hayden Wilson Head Jr. |
| Preceded by William Henry Stafford Jr. | Judge of the United States Foreign Intelligence Surveillance Court; 2003–2010 | Succeeded by Martin Leach-Cross Feldman |
