= McKool Smith =

Law firm based in the United States

- No. of offices: 7
- Offices: Austin; Dallas; Houston; Los Angeles; Marshall; New York City; Washington, D.C.
- No. of attorneys: 130
- Major practice areas: Commercial litigation Intellectual property Bankruptcy; White collar defense
- Date founded: 1991
- Founder: Mike McKool; Phillip N. Smith
- Website: mckoolsmith.com

McKool Smith is a U.S. trial firm with more than 130 trial lawyers across seven offices in Austin, Dallas, Houston, Los Angeles, Marshall, New York City, and Washington, D.C. The firm represents clients in disputes involving commercial litigation, intellectual property (IP), bankruptcy, and white collar defense matters.

== History ==
McKool Smith was founded in Dallas, Texas, in 1991 by chairman Mike McKool and Phillip N. Smith. In 1996, the firm expanded into Marshall, in the Eastern District of Texas. McKool Smith launched an intellectual property litigation practice in 2000 with the opening of its Austin, Texas office. The firm added an International Trade Commission (ITC) litigation practice and a new Washington, D.C. office in 2007. This same year, the firm opened an office in New York and added a white collar defense practice. In 2009, McKool Smith expanded into bankruptcy litigation with the opening of its Houston, Texas office. In September 2011, McKool Smith announced the joining of Hennigan Dorman, a Los Angeles, California-based trial firm specializing in business disputes and IP litigation. The combination added 35 trial lawyers to McKool Smith's ranks and launched the firm's first California office.

=== Notable clients and cases ===
McKool Smith represented the plaintiff, i4i, in patent infringement actions against Microsoft (i4i Limited Partnership v. Microsoft Corporation, No. 6:07-CV-113 in the U.S. District Court for the Eastern District of Texas). Judge Leonard Davis signed a permanent injunction against Microsoft and ordered total damages/interest of more than $290 million.

McKool Smith represented the plaintiff, Versata Software (Versata Software Inc. v. SAP America Inc., 07cv153, U.S. District Court, Eastern District of Texas (Marshall)) in this patent infringement case. A federal jury in Texas found that SAP America Inc. infringed three claims of a Versata patent for product pricing software and awarded Versata $260 million in compensation and $85 million in royalties.

== Recognition ==
The firm was ranked #308 on the National Law Journal's 2025 NLJ500.

McKool Smith was named the "Plaintiff Firm of the Year" for the 2024 Elite Trial Lawyers Awards hosted by The National Law Journal.

McKool Smith secured a larger number of National Law Journal and Verdict Search "Top 100 Verdicts" over the last five years than any other law firm. In 2012, the Chambers USA Guide ranked McKool Smith nationally in IP litigation and regionally in Texas for IP and Commercial litigation. Ten attorneys ranked individually as leaders in their field. In an August, 2012 Wall Street Journal article, McKool Smith is described as "...one of the biggest law-firm success stories of the past decades..."

McKool Smith was named to The National Law Journal's 'Midsize Hot List' 2009–2011 and to the magazine's "NLJ 250 List" in 2012.

In March 2011, McKool Smith, named one of the Top Four patent litigation firms in the U.S. In 2011 by Managing Intellectual Property magazine, received the publication's 2011 "Patent Case of the Year" honor for securing a $290 million judgment for i4i Inc. against Microsoft. The judgment was unanimously affirmed by the U.S. Supreme Court on June 9, 2011, and reportedly represents the largest U.S. patent infringement award to be affirmed on appeal. McKool Smith was ranked nationally as a leading firm for Intellectual Property in 2011 by The Legal 500, which stated that the firm is "…very professional and focused…and has its clients' commercial interests at heart." McKool Smith secured two of the ten "Biggest IP Litigation Wins of 2011," according to Corporate Counsel Magazine, January 2012. The firm was named "IP Firm of the Year" in the Southern region of the United States by Benchmark Litigation magazine, March 2011.

McKool Smith Hennigan was ranked a 2010 'Best Law Firm in California' for Intellectual Property Law by U.S. News & World Report. On a national level, McKool Smith Hennigan was ranked for Bankruptcy and Creditor Rights/Insolvency and Reorganization Law.
