= List of killings by law enforcement officers in the United States, April 2020 =

This is a list of people reported killed by non-military law enforcement officers in the United States in April 2020, whether in the line of duty or not, and regardless of reason or method. The listing documents the occurrence of a death, making no implications regarding wrongdoing or justification on the part of the person killed or officer involved. Killings are arranged by date of the incident that caused death. Different death dates, if known, are noted in the description. The table below lists 107 people.

== April 2020 ==
Date	Name (age) of deceased	Race	State (city)	Description
2020-04-30	Christopher Lee Sauseda (34)	Hispanic	Texas (League City)	
2020-04-30	Timothy Gilbert (43)	White	Kentucky (Boons Camp)	
2020-04-30	Daniel Hernandez Bravo (28)	Hispanic	California (Los Angeles)	
2020-04-29	Shaun Fuhr (24)	Black	Washington (Seattle)	Police officers responded to a 9-1-1 call from a woman who said she had been beaten by her boyfriend, that he had fired a gun at her, and had kidnapped their one-year-old daughter. Following a brief foot chase in the Mount Baker neighborhood, and without warning, Shaun Fuhr was shot in the head while carrying his daughter. In footage from an officer's body camera, Fuhr does not appear to have a weapon.
2020-04-29	Artemio Mondragon Alfaro (29)	Hispanic	California (Ripperdan)	
2020-04-29	Jesus Caballero-Herrera (38)	Hispanic	Nevada (Las Vegas)	
2020-04-29	Joshua Kyle Priest (33)	Unknown race	Oklahoma (Bristow)	
2020-04-29	Nicole Ann Stephens (30)	White	Oklahoma (Bristow)	
2020-04-29	Denzel Marshal Taylor	Black	Missouri (Sikeston)	
2020-04-29	Malcolm "Milky" Xavier Ray Williams (27)	Black	Indiana (Jeffersonville)	
2020-04-28	James R. Best (45)	Unknown race	Pennsylvania (Bedford)	
2020-04-28	William E. Abbe (50)	White	Washington (Vancouver)	
2020-04-28	Robert Musser (32)	White	Arizona (Buckeye)	
2020-04-28	Jonas Joseph (26)	Black	Florida (Tampa)	
2020-04-27	Faron Morris Hammond (61)	White	Georgia (Hogansville)	
2020-04-27	Jamie Lamar Darley (33)	Unknown race	Georgia (Fort Valley)	
2020-04-27	Christopher Aguirre (28)	Hispanic	Texas (Houston)	
2020-04-26	De Quang Tran (59)	Asian	Maryland (La Plata)	
2020-04-26	Bradley G. Pullman (48)	Unknown race	New Jersey (Wayne)	
2020-04-25	Reed Rickabaugh (59)	White	Maine (Hiram)	
2020-04-25	Kelvin D. Shaw (37)	Black	Illinois (Rock Island)	
2020-04-24	Timothy Darryl Sides Jr. (28)	Unknown race	North Carolina (Lenoir)	
2020-04-24	Brandan Reid Nylander (24)	White	California (Napa)	
2020-04-24	Marlon Aaron Bonds (53)	Unknown race	Texas (Denton)	
2020-04-24	Michael Ramos (42)	Hispanic	Texas (Austin)	Police officers responded to a 9-1-1 call following up on a report that two people were using drugs in a car in a parking lot and that the man in the car was waving a gun in the air. Officers confronted Ramos at the location, and with video showing Ramos having his hands in the air, an officer shot him with a bean bag round. Soon after, Ramos got into a car and began driving. An Austin police officer then fired a rifle at the moving car and struck Ramos, who died of his injuries. Investigators executed a search warrant two days later and found no firearm inside or around Ramos’ vehicle. Christopher Taylor, the officer who fired the shot which killed Ramos, would not be retried for the death of Michael Ramos following a mistrial, but would be convicted in October 2024 of deadly conduct related to a separate case involving a death from July 2019.
2020-04-24	Roy Joiner (67)	Unknown race	Georgia (Adel)	
2020-04-23	Luan Leo Agolli (42)	White	New Jersey (Paterson)	
2020-04-23	Mason Farnsworth (16)	Unknown race	Colorado (Longmont)	
2020-04-23	Fred Brown (34)	Unknown race	Nevada (North Las Vegas)	
2020-04-22	Elmer L. Mack (40)	Black	South Carolina (Florence)	
2020-04-22	Daniel Hernandez	Hispanic	California (Los Angeles)	
2020-04-22	Christopher Lawson (31)	Unknown race	Colorado (Springfield)	
2020-04-22	Craig Albert Dandy (31)	Hispanic	Arizona (Mesa)	
2020-04-22	Joshua Johnson (35)	Black	Missouri City, TX	
2020-04-21	Thomas M. Mathes III (29)	Unknown race	Washington (East Wenatchee)	
2020-04-21	Nicholas Chavez (27)	Hispanic	Texas (Houston)	Four officers responded to Chavez walking through traffic. After fifteen minutes where the officers failed to deescalate the situation, they used bean bags and stun guns, which also failed. The officers then shot at Chavez three times. Chavez pulled on the wires of the stun gun that was still attached to him, and officers responded by shooting him 21 times. The four officers were fired by Police Chief Acevedo 9 Sep 2020. The Harris County District Attorney Kim Ogg will present the case to a grand jury for possible criminal charges.
2020-04-21	Carlos Ingram-Lopez (27)	Hispanic	Arizona (Tucson)	Three officers pinned Ingram-Lopez down after his grandmother called police. After telling police he could not breathe, he fell unconscious and died. An independent autopsy determined Ingram-Lopez died due to asphyxiation.
2020-04-21	Chase Rosa (24)	Black	Nevada (Las Vegas)	
2020-04-19	Richard Lugo (36)	Unknown race	California (Lancaster)	
2020-04-19	Ramon Thomas Villagomez (31)	Hispanic	Texas (Rowlett)	
2020-04-19	Virgill Thorpe (28)	Black	Colorado (Colorado Springs)	
2020-04-19	Joel Acevedo (25)	Black	Wisconsin (Milwaukee)	
2020-04-19	Mason Workman (40)	White	Nevada (Henderson)	
2020-04-18	Willie J. Hampton (37)	Unknown race	Missouri (Raytown)	
2020-04-18	Graciano Ceballos (38)	Hispanic	California (Bakersfield)	
2020-04-18	Austin Dean Heights (24)	White	Minnesota (Mankato)	
2020-04-18	Steven Demarco Taylor (33)	Black	California (San Leandro)	Police were called to Walmart after reports of a possible robbery or theft taking place. A man, Steven Taylor, picked up an aluminum baseball bat before security encountered him. Officer Jason Fletcher Tasered Taylor twice from about 17 feet away. Taylor, still armed with a bat, was shot in the chest by Fletcher as backup arrived. On September 2, 2020, Fletcher was charged with voluntary manslaughter and was arraigned on September 15.
2020-04-17	Marcus Eugene Epps (43)	White	South Carolina (Anderson)	
2020-04-17	Derick L. Powe (30)	Black	Alabama (Daphne)	
2020-04-16	Juan Ayon-Barraza (24)	Hispanic	California (Richmond, Oakland)	Barraza pointed a gun at officers in Richmond when they fired at him. He survived and evaded the police until he crashed into a parked police cruiser and pinned an officer in between his cruiser and the van. Other officers surrounded the van and shot into it when Barraza tried to drive forward. Barraza died en-route to the hospital and the wounded officer recovered.
2020-04-16	Salvatore Friscia Jr. (48)	White	Montana (Philipsburg)	
2020-04-16	Jasman Washington (31)	Black	Texas (Lubbock)	
2020-04-15	Randy Steven Ashland (58)	White	Wisconsin (Waukesha)	
2020-04-15	Anthony Wilson (28)	Unknown race	Missouri (Jefferson City)	
2020-04-15	Tony Michael Clements (33)	Asian	North Carolina (Hubert)	
2020-04-15	James Hinman (56)	Unknown race	Wyoming (Riverton)	
2020-04-15	Goldie Bellinger (39)	Black	Georgia (Augusta)	
2020-04-15	Leslie Flynn Jr. (39)	White	Nebraska (Blair)	
2020-04-14	Thomas A. Powell III (31)	White	Maine (Old Town)	
2020-04-13	Javier Vidal (36)	Hispanic	California (Bakersfield)	
2020-04-13	Unnamed man	Unknown race	Missouri (Jackson)	
2020-04-12	Justin Silvernale (35)	White	California (Daly City)	
2020-04-12	Miguel Gomez (56)	Hispanic	Florida (Pompano Beach)	
2020-04-12	Evaristo Hernandez Jr. (47)	Hispanic	Texas (Laredo)	
2020-04-12	Shawn Lee (48)	Unknown race	Washington (Ritzville)	
2020-04-12	Ruben Deleon (25)	Hispanic	New Mexico (Tome)	
2020-04-11	Errol K. Bolin (51)	White	Indiana (West Terre Haute)	
2020-04-11	Timothy Barker (54)	White	Oregon (Milwaukie)	
2020-04-11	Leah Baker (29)	White	Florida (Jacksonville)	Baker, who suffered from mental illness called police after she had an argument with a housemate about her medication. When officers arrived, one officer knocked on the door and waited on the porch. When the door opened, Baker rushed out and stabbed the officer in the arm. The officer retreated and shot at Baker, both shots missing her. Then, her fellow officer shot at Baker and Baker fell on the ground. She got up again and grabbed her knife and tried to stab the officers. After getting her on the ground one more time by shooting her more, she finally sat on the ground clutching the knife. A while later, she was taken to the hospital where she died of her wounds. The officer was given medical treatment at the E.R and survived. The shooting was caught on bodycamera.
2020-04-10	Carlos Castaneda (34)	Hispanic	Missouri (St. Louis)	
2020-04-10	Justin Battenfield (34)	Unknown race	Arkansas (Fort Smith)	
2020-04-10	Jonathan Lee Adams (31)	Black	Pennsylvania (Pottstown)	
2020-04-10	Kanisha Necole Fuller (43)	Black	Alabama (Birmingham)	
2020-04-10	Matthew Brennon Goff	White	Oregon (Klamath Falls)	
2020-04-10	Maria Theresa Magana Bedolla (31)	Hispanic	Washington (Lakewood)	
2020-04-10	Giuseppe Particianone (33)	White	Pennsylvania (Philadelphia)	Officers reported after reports of gunshots. After Kaitlynn Tugliese pointed a gun at the police they shot her and Particianone, killing him.
2020-04-09	Kenneth Jeremy Blair (36)	White	Tennessee (Winchester)	
2020-04-09	Zach Gifford (39)	White	Colorado (Brandon)	During a traffic stop, an unarmed and handcuffed Gifford was shot three times in the back by now-former officers Tracy Weisenhorn and Quinten Stump. An investigation determined Stump knew Gifford was unarmed after a pat-down but did not inform Weisenhorn, who fired first, of this. Stump was charged with two counts of attempted murder and one count of assault; the attempted murder charges were due to investigators not determining which officer fired the fatal shot. He was acquitted of one attempted murder count, while the jury deadlocked on the other two charges.
2020-04-09	Desmond Franklin (23)	Black	Ohio (Cleveland)	An off-duty officer in plainclothes and an unmarked vehicle witnessed Franklin allegedly steal soda from the back of a truck and put it in his own vehicle. After speaking with Franklin, the officer shot him as he drove away. The officer claimed that Franklin had fired at him, although no evidence of shots fired by Franklin were found, and Franklin's passenger stated he hadn't pointed his gun at the officer. In 2022, a 4-3 vote from the Civilian Police Review Board recommended discipline against the officer, with the members finding the officer had failed to identify himself before the shooting. The vote was along racial lines, with the four black members voting for recommending discipline and the three white members voting against it.
2020-04-08	Joshua Dariandre Ruffin (17)	Black	South Carolina (Columbia)	
2020-04-08	Rick Howell (59)	White	Maryland (Salisbury)	
2020-04-08	Tony Zaffina (49)	White	California (Oceanside)	
2020-04-07	Joshua Bacco (31)	White	Arizona (El Mirage)	
2020-04-07	Idris Abdus-Salaam (33)	Black	Tennessee (Knoxville)	
2020-04-07	Jacob Matthew Dau (38)	White	Iowa (Clinton)	
2020-04-07	Derek Taylor Swanson (28)	White	Louisiana (Shreveport)	
2020-04-07	Dewayne Curtis Lafond (44)	Black	Texas (Refugio)	
2020-04-07	Brandon Mark Stoke (37)	Unknown race	Washington (La Grande)	
2020-04-06	Yamil Acevedo (29)	Hispanic	Florida (North Miami Beach)	
2020-04-06	Kelvin Parks (54)	White	Alabama (Florence)	
2020-04-05	Tommie Dale McGlothen Jr. (44)	Black	Louisiana (Shreveport)	Four Louisiana police officers were indicted Friday, 2020-09-18, on charges of negligent homicide and malfeasance after they used excessive force and a Taser to arrest a mentally ill Black man and then failed to give him medical attention. Officers had then placed Mr. McGlothen in a patrol cruiser on his head, limiting his ability to breathe and held in the cruiser, largely unsupervised, for 48 minutes and subsequently died at hospital.
2020-04-05	Richard Lee Kampstra (67)	White	Florida (Melbourne)	
2020-04-05	Name Withheld (59)	Unknown race	Florida (Hialeah)	
2020-04-05	Philip Castonguay III (32)	White	Massachusetts (Milford)	
2020-04-05	Carl Manning (62)	White	New Hampshire (Manchester)	
2020-04-05	Michael Hammett (44)	White	Oklahoma (Ada)	
2020-04-04	Leneard M. Bliss (27)	White	West Virginia (Nutter Fort)	
2020-04-03	Stephen Dolceamore (29)		New Jersey (Trenton)	Police were called to a hospital where Dolceamore was "behaving erratically." Police held Dolceamore down on the ground, where he died. Before he died, Dolceamore said, "I can't breathe."
2020-04-02	Jose Soto (27)		Connecticut (Manchester)	Soto was killed by a SWAT team serving an arrest warrant for a parole violation. No weapon was found near him, and his family says he had post-traumatic stress disorder.
2020-04-02	Nathan R. Hodge (66)	Black	Louisiana (Swartz)	
2020-04-02	David A. Xanatos (40)	White	Oregon (Lincoln City)	
2020-04-02	Jose Moreno (30)	Hispanic	Arizona (Mesa)	
2020-04-02	Joseph Zahazcewski (69)	White	Texas (Irving)	
2020-04-01	David Mathew Cain (36)	White	Wyoming (Wheatland)	
2020-04-01	Rico Robles (28)	White	California (Aguanga)	
2020-04-01	Lyndon Gray	White	Kentucky (Burkesville)	
2020-04-01	Austin Hines (19)	White	Mississippi (Columbus)	Hines was shot and killed by police after a pursuit involving a stolen vehicle.

== See also ==
- Death in custody § United States
- Henry A. Wallace Police Crime Public Database
- List of cases of police brutality
- List of countries with annual rates and counts for killings by law enforcement officers
- List of law enforcement officers killed in the line of duty in the United States
- List of law enforcement officers convicted for an on-duty killing in the United States
- List of shootings by US immigration agents
- List of police reforms related to the George Floyd protests
- List of unarmed African Americans killed by law enforcement officers in the United States
- Lists of killings by law enforcement officers
- Police brutality in the United States
- Police misconduct § United States
- Police riot § United States
- Police use of deadly force in the United States
