= List of Sigma Pi Phi chapters =

Sigma Pi Phi is an African American professional fraternity. Founded in Philadelphia, Pennsylvania, in 1904, it is the oldest Greek lettered fraternity for African Americans. It is a community-based fraternity and does not have collegiate chapters. The fraternity refers to its chapters as Boulé.

Following is an incomplete list of Sigma Pi Phi boulé, with active chapters indicated in bold and inactive chapters in italics.

| Boulé | Charter date and range | Location | Status | Ref. |
|---|---|---|---|---|
| **Alpha** | May 15, 1904 | Philadelphia, Pennsylvania | Active | |
| **Beta** | July 19, 1907 | Chicago, Illinois | Active | |
| **Gamma** | May 8, 1908 | Baltimore, Maryland | Active | |
| **Delta** | July 17, 1910 | Memphis, Tennessee | Active | |
| **Epsilon** | February 1911 | Washington, D.C. | Active | |
| **Zeta** | January 6, 1912 | New York City, New York | Active | |
| **Eta** | November 30, 1912 | St. Louis, Missouri | Active | |
| **Theta** | May 22, 1915 | Kansas City, Missouri | Active | |
| **Iota** | March 23, 1917 | Detroit, Michigan | Active | |
| **Kappa** | January 24, 1920 | Atlanta, Georgia | Active | |
| **Lambda** | June 21, 1921 | Columbus, Ohio | Active | |
| Mu (First) | July 10, 1921– August 1933 | Wichita, Kansas | Inactive, Reassigned | |
| Nu (First) | July 14, 1921– 19xx ? | Denver, Colorado | Inactive, Reassigned | |
| **Xi** | September 15, 1921 | Los Angeles, California | Active | |
| **Omicron** | May 6, 1922 | Minneapolis and Saint Paul, Minnesota | Active | |
| **Pi** | December 22, 1922 | Little Rock, Arkansas | Active | |
| **Rho** | January 27, 1923 | Pittsburgh, Pennsylvania | Active | |
| **Sigma** | April 19, 1924 | Dayton, Ohio | Active | |
| **Tau** | June 15, 1925 | Cleveland, Ohio | Active | |
| **Upsilon** | July 15, 1926 | Charleston, West Virginia | Active | |
| **Phi** | July 28, 1938 | Montgomery and Tuskegee, Alabama | Active | |
| **Chi** | May 1, 1939 | Nashville, Tennessee | Active | |
| **Psi** | October 27, 1939 | Louisville, Kentucky | Active | |
| **Omega** | | | Memorial | |
| **Alpha Alpha** | April 12, 1940 | New Orleans, Louisiana | Active | |
| **Alpha Beta** | April 4, 1941 | Richmond, Virginia | Active | |
| **Alpha Gamma** | June 10, 1944 | Oakland and Berkeley, California | Active | |
| **Alpha Delta** | April 24, 1948 | Cincinnati, Ohio | Active | |
| **Alpha Epsilon** | June 30, 1948 | Dallas and Fort Worth, Texas | Active | |
| **Mu (Second)** | November 5, 1949 | Northern New Jersey | Active | |
| **Nu (Second)** | May 27, 1950 | Houston, Texas | Active | |
| Alpha Zeta | May 19, 1951 | Tallahassee, Florida | Inactive | |
| **Alpha Eta** | April 3, 1953 | Indianapolis, Indiana | Active | |
| **Alpha Theta** | June 18, 1954 | Oklahoma statewide | Active | (Note: Chapter originally served Oklahoma City and Tulsa, Oklahoma.) |
| **Alpha Iota** | July 13, 1954 | Columbia, South Carolina | Active | (Note: Chapter originally served Columbia and Orangeburg, South Carolina. Orangeburg is now covered by Delta Chi.) |
| **Alpha Kappa** | July 31, 1954 | Buffalo, New York | Active | |
| **Alpha Lambda** | | Savannah, Georgia | Active | |
| Alpha Mu | | Augusta, Georgia | Inactive | |
| **Alpha Nu** | | Wichita, Kansas | Active | |
| **Alpha Xi** | | Baton Rouge, Louisiana | Active | |
| **Alpha Omicron** | | Seattle, Washington | Active | |
| **Alpha Pi** | | San Diego, California | Active | |
| **Alpha Rho** | | Miami, Florida | Active | |
| **Alpha Sigma** | | Brooklyn and Long Island, New York | Active | |
| **Alpha Tau** | | Durham, North Carolina | Active | |
| Alpha Upsilon | | Bluefield, West VIrginia and Ohio | Inactive | |
| **Alpha Phi** | | Toledo, Ohio | Active | |
| **Alpha Chi** | | Lansing, Michigan | Active | |
| **Alpha Psi** | | Hartford, Connecticut | Active | |
| **Beta Alpha** | | Milwaukee, Wisconsin | Active | |
| **Beta Beta** | | Boston, Massachusetts | Active | |
| **Beta Gamma** | | Jackson, Mississippi | Active | |
| **Beta Delta** | | Charlottes, North Carolina | Active | |
| **Beta Epsilon** | | Greensboro, North Carolina | Active | |
| **Beta Zeta** | | Westchester County, New York | Active | |
| **Beta Eta** | June 4, 1978 | Delaware statewide | Active | (Note: Chapter was originally formed in Wilmington, Delaware and included lower Pennsylvania to Dover, Delaware.) |
| **Beta Theta** | | Knoxville, Tennessee | Active | |
| **Beta Iota** | February 21, 1981 | Waterbury, Connecticut | Active | |
| **Beta Kappa** | May 17, 1981 | Birmingham, Alabama | Active | |
| **Beta Lambda** | | Hampton and Norfolk, VIrginia | Active | |
| **Beta Mu** | | Suburban Maryland | Active | |
| **Beta Nu** | November 15, 1981 | Northern Virginia | Active | |
| **Beta Xi** | May 16, 1982 | Central Florida | Active | |
| **Beta Omicron** | | Grand Rapids, Michigan | Active | |
| **Beta Pi** | 1984 | Harrisburg, Pennsylvania | Active | |
| **Beta Rho** | | Akron and Kent, Ohio | Active | |
| **Beta Sigma** | | Springfield, Massachusetts | Active | |
| **Beta Tau** | | New Haven, Connecticut | Active | |
| **Beta Upsilon** | | San Francisco, California | Active | |
| **Beta Phi** | October 28, 1983 | Lynchburg and Roanoke, Virginia | Active | |
| **Beta Chi** | | Fort Valley, Georgia | Active | |
| **Beta Psi** | May 5, 1984 | Albany, New York | Active | |
| **Gamma Alpha** | | Tucson, Arizona | Active | |
| **Gamma Beta** | June 1984 | Jacksonville, Florida | Active | |
| **Gamma Gamma** | 1984 | Austin, Texas | Active | |
| **Gamma Delta** | | Flint, Michigan | Active | |
| **Gamma Epsilon** | July 7, 1984 | Sacramento, California | Active | |
| **Gamma Zeta** | | Pasadena, California | Active | |
| **Gamma Eta** | | Des Moines, Iowa | Active | |
| **Gamma Theta** | | Princess Anne, Maryland | Active | |
| **Gamma Iota** | | Rochester, New York | Active | |
| **Gamma Kappa** | | Winston-Salem, North Carolina | Active | |
| **Gamma Lambda** | | Charleston, South Carolina | Active | |
| **Gamma Mu** | | Phoenix, Arizona | Active | |
| **Gamma Nu** | | Northern Mississippi | Active | |
| **Gamma Xi** | 1995 | Sarasota, Florida | Active | |
| **Gamma Omicron** | | Tampa Bay, Florida | Active | |
| **Gamma Pi** | July 12, 1986 | Chattanooga, Tennessee | Active | |
| **Gamma Rho** | | Ann Arbor, Michigan | Active | |
| **Gamma Sigma** | | Raleigh, North Carolina | Active | |
| **Gamma Tau** | | Kenosha and Racine, Wisconsin | Active | |
| **Gamma Upsilon** | June 27, 1987 | Asheville, North Carolina | Active | |
| **Gamma Phi** | 1988 | San Antonio, Texas | Active | |
| **Gamma Chi** | | San Jose, California | Active | |
| **Gamma Psi** | | Columbus, Georgia | Active | |
| **Delta Alpha** | | Northern Illinois | Active | |
| **Delta Beta** | | Greenville, South Carolina | Active | |
| **Delta Gamma** | | Tyler, Texas | Active | |
| Delta Delta | | Albany, Georgia | | |
| **Delta Epsilon** | | South Jersey | Active | |
| Delta Zeta | | Beaumont, Texas | | |
| **Delta Eta** | | Denver, Colorado | Active | |
| **Delta Theta** | | Las Vegas, Nevada | | |
| Delta Iota | | Mobile, Alabama | Active | |
| **Delta Kappa** | 1994 | Shreveport, Louisiana | Active | |
| **Delta Lambda** | | Nassau, The Bahamas | Active | |
| **Delta Mu** | | Fort Worth and Arlington, Texas | Active | |
| **Delta Nu** | 1996 | Fairfield County, Connecticut | Active | |
| **Delta Xi** | | Walnut and Diamond Bar, California | Active | |
| **Delta Omicron** | | Gulf Coast, Mississippi | Active | |
| **Delta Pi** | | Pensacola, Florida | Active | |
| **Delta Rho** | | Anchorage, Alaska | Active | |
| **Delta Sigma** | | South Suburban Chicago | Active | |
| **Delta Tau** | | Frankfort, Kentucky | Active | |
| **Delta Upsilon** | | North Atlanta, Georgia | Active | |
| **Delta Phi** | | Portland, Oregon | Active | |
| **Delta Chi** | | Orangeburg, South Carolina | Active | |
| **Delta Psi** | | Athens, Georgia | Active | |
| **Epsilon Alpha** | | ?, North Carolina | Active | |
| **Epsilon Beta** | | Contra Costa County, California | Active | |
| **Epsilon Gamma** | | Chapel Hill, North Carolina | Active | |
| **Epsilon Delta** | | Williamsburg, Virginia | Active | |
| **Epsilon Epsilon** | | Orange County, California | Active | |
| **Epsilon Zeta** | April 25, 2009 | Loudoun County, Virginia | Active | |
| **Epsilon Eta** | | Stockton and Central Valley, California | Active | |
| Epsilon Theta | | | | |
| **Epsilon Iota** | October 3, 2009 | Tulsa, Oklahoma | Active | |
| **Epsilon Kappa** | | Huntsville, Alabama | Active | |
| **Epsilon Lambda** | January 29, 2011 | Palm Beach County, Martin County, and St. Lucie County, Florida | Active | |
| **Epsilon Mu** | | Hilton Head Island, South Carolina | Active | |
| Epsilon Nu | | | | |
| **Epsilon Xi** | | London, England | Active | |
| **Epsilon Omicron** | | North Houston, Texas | Active | |
| **Epsilon Pi** | | Southlake, Texas | Active | |
| **Epsilon Rho** | | Fredericksburg, Virginia | Active | |
| **Epsilon Sigma** | | Prince William County, Virginia | Active | |
| **Epsilon Tau** | | Inland Empire of Southern California | Active | |
| **Epsilon Upsilon** | | South Atlanta, Georgia | Active | |
| **Epsilon Phi** | June 12, 2018 | Prince George's County, Maryland | Active | |
| **Epsilon Chi** | | Colorado Springs, Colorado | Active | |
| **Epsilon Psi** | | Charlottesville, Virginia | Active | |
| **Zeta Alpha** | | Fort Bend, Texas | Active | |
| **Zeta Beta** | | North Dallas, Texas | Active | |
| **Zeta Gamma** | November 12, 2021 | Annapolis and Anne Arundel County, Maryland | Active | |
| **Zeta Delta** | November 13, 2021 | Mercer County, New Jersey and Bucks County, Pennsylvania | Active | |
| **Zeta Epsilon** | August 26, 2023 | San Fernando Valley, California | Active | |
| **Zeta Zeta** | December 6, 2023 | Syracuse, New York | Active | |
