= 2024 Harris County District Attorney election =

- November 5, 2024
- Turnout: 58.84%
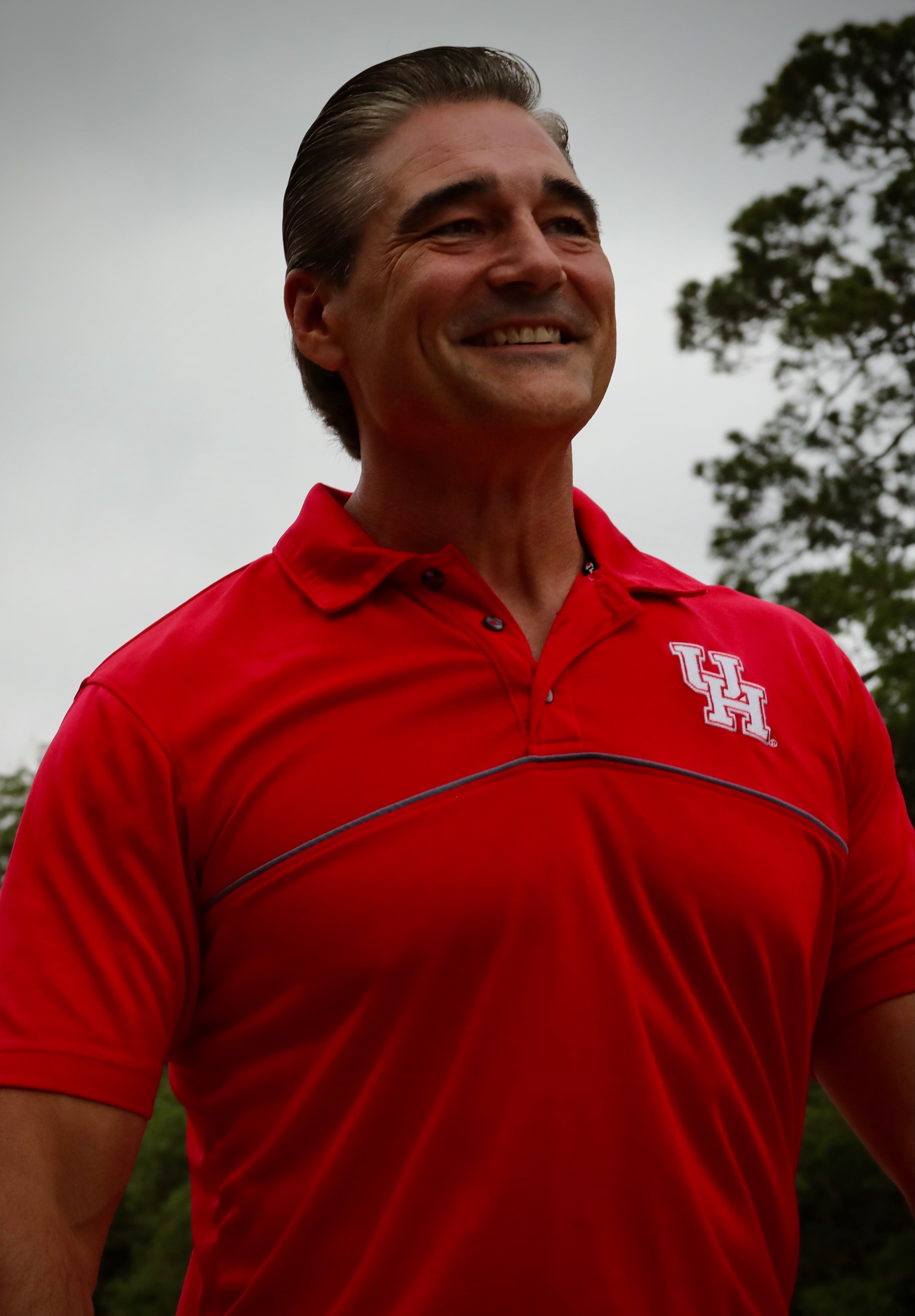

Candidate	Sean Teare	Dan Simons
Party	Democratic	Republican
Popular vote	749,403	721,563
Percentage	50.95%	49.05%
District Attorney before election
Kim Ogg
Democratic
Elected District Attorney
Sean Teare
Democratic

The 2024 Harris County District Attorney election was held on November 5, 2024, to elect the District Attorney of Harris County. Primary elections were held on March 5, 2024.

Incumbent Democratic District Attorney Kim Ogg ran for reelection to a third term, but was defeated in the Democratic primary by former prosecutor Sean Teare. Teare then went on to win the general election over Republican nominee and fellow former prosecutor Dan Simons, 51% to 49%.

== Democratic primary ==
=== Background ===
Kim Ogg had previously investigated county elected officials and staffers several times after having public disagreements over issues such as bail reform, violence interruption program implementation, and her office's budget. Almost $1 million in taxpayer dollars were spent on legal fees for investigations that never resulted in criminal charges.

A Harris County grand jury indicted three senior advisors to Harris County Democrat Judge Lina Hidalgo in April 2022 on two public corruption felonies each. The charges, each first-degree felonies, involved allegedly steering an $11 million COVID vaccine outreach campaign to a one-person consulting firm owned by a Democratic strategist. The Texas Rangers investigated the cases. All three charges were eventually dismissed after a review of the evidence by Texas Attorney General Ken Paxton.

In December 2023, Kim Ogg was admonished by the local Democratic Party, which alleged she "abused the power of her office to pursue personal vendettas against her political opponents, sided with Republicans to advance their extremist agenda, and stood in the way of fixing the broken criminal justice system." Ogg went on to lose the Democratic primary in a landslide to former prosecutor Sean Teare, being defeated by a margin of 50 points as an incumbent.

=== Candidates ===
==== Nominee ====
- Sean Teare, former prosecutor.

==== Eliminated in primary ====
- Kim Ogg, incumbent District Attorney.

=== Results ===
March 5, 2024 Democratic primary
Party	Candidate	Votes	%
Democratic	Sean Teare	126,449	75.00%
Democratic	Kim Ogg (incumbent)	42,149	25.00%
Total votes		168,598	100.00%

== Republican nomination ==
=== Candidates ===
==== Nominee ====
- Dan Simons, former prosecutor.

=== Results ===
March 5, 2024 Republican primary
Party	Candidate	Votes	%
Republican	Dan Simons	145,293	100.00%
Total votes		145,293	100.00%

== General election ==
=== Results ===
2024 Harris County District Attorney election
Party	Candidate	Votes	%
Democratic	Sean Teare	749,403	50.95%
Republican	Dan Simons	721,563	49.05%
Total votes		1,470,966	100.00%
Democratic hold			
