= Killing of Jocelyn Nungaray =

2024 homicide of a 12-year-old girl in Texas

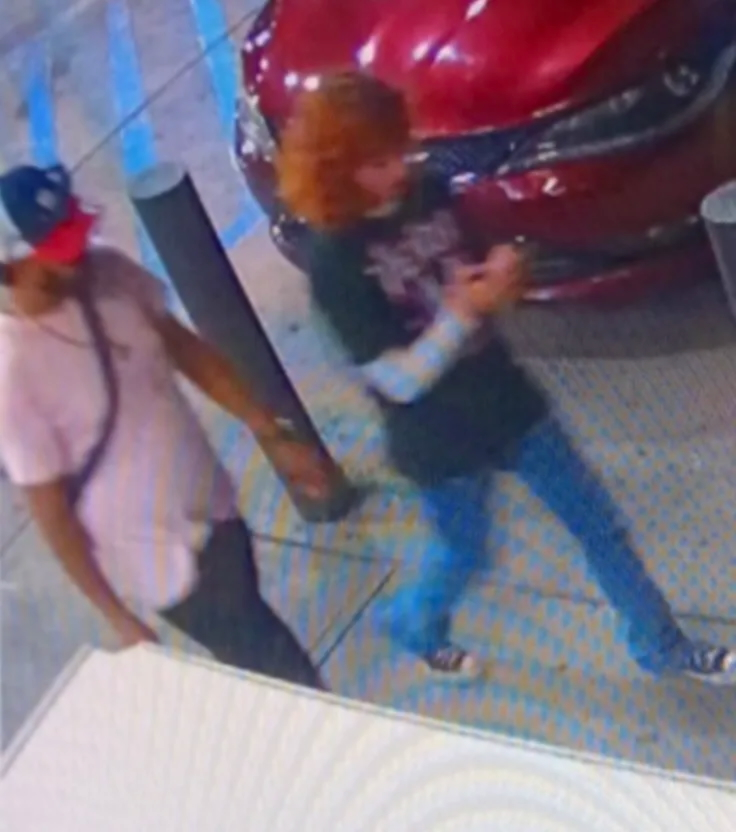
- Surveillance image of Jocelyn Nungaray reportedly being followed by one of the perpetrators
- Location: North Houston, Texas, U.S.
- Date: June 16, 2024 c. 10:00 p.m. (CT)
- Attack type: Child homicide by strangulation and rape
- Victims: Jocelyn Nungaray, aged 12
- Motive: Sexual gratification
- Accused: 2
- Charges: Capital murder; Kidnapping; Aggravated sexual assault

On June 16, 2024, at 10:00 p.m., Jocelyn Nungaray, a 12-year-old American girl, was sexually assaulted and killed in North Houston, Texas, United States. The case attracted national attention, as two undocumented immigrants from Venezuela, Johan José Martínez-Rangel and Franklin José Peña Ramos, were charged with her murder. Authorities found her body the next morning in a creek in North Houston and determined she had been raped and murdered by strangulation. Texas prosecutors have indicted the men on charges of capital murder, kidnapping, and aggravated sexual assault.

== Victim ==
Jocelyn Lisel Nungaray was born on December 27, 2011, as the older of two children. She was in sixth grade at Gordon-Reed Elementary School until March 2024, when she moved away to North Houston with her single mother and younger brother.

== Prelude ==
United States Border Patrol apprehended Johan José Martínez-Rangel near El Paso on March 14, 2024, but he was released the same day, on an order of release on recognizance, with a notice to appear in court at a later date. U.S. Border Patrol arrested Franklin José Peña Ramos on May 28, 2024, also near El Paso, but he was also released with a notice to appear in court at a later date.

== Killing ==
Nungaray snuck out of her home at 10:00 p.m. on June 16 to go to Houston. The two accused men had started their evening at a restaurant. While walking, they met Nungaray on Kuykendahl Road, and talked to her for a couple of minutes. According to court documents, they were asking her for directions. The three then walked to a convenience store. After a few minutes, they walked together to a bridge on West Rankin Road, where Nungaray was strangled. Court documents allege that the three of them were under the bridge for over two hours, during which Nungaray was tied up and had her pants taken off. Results from the Houston Forensic Science Center showed that the victim was sexually assaulted before her death. The following morning, at around 6:15 a.m. on June 17, police received a call about the discovery of Nungaray's body lying in a ditch near her home.

Two suspects, identified as 22-year-old Johan José Martínez-Rangel and 26-year-old Franklin José Peña Ramos, were arrested on June 20 at 13355 Northborough Drive at the Canfield Lakes Apartments. Both were charged with capital murder. Police released surveillance images of the two suspects; their roommates, one of whom was Peña's boss, reported them to the police. Martínez-Rangel had bite and scratch marks on his arms at the time of his arrest.

== Court proceedings ==
Houston mayor John Whitmire had wanted both defendants to be held without bail indefinitely; on June 24, bond was set at $10 million for Peña. In the bail hearing on June 23, Harris County district attorney Kim Ogg stated that Peña had told police that he had kissed the victim, but that Martínez-Rangel was responsible for the murder and assault. Martínez-Rangel appeared in court the next day, and admitted to tying the victim's legs together and ordering Peña to throw her into a nearby creek. Both men were scheduled for a September 2024 return date to court.

Ogg stated that the two suspects were not eligible for the death sentence under Texas law based on the victim's age (as Nungaray was older than 10 years of age); however, if it was found that Nungaray was kidnapped or raped, both would be eligible for the death sentence. In September 2024, the suspects were charged with kidnapping and aggravated sexual assault of Nungaray. On December 13, 2024, Ogg filed official notice to seek the death penalty for both defendants.

== Reactions ==
Texas governor Greg Abbott called for the death penalty for the two accused. Presidential candidate and then-former president Donald Trump blamed his political rival and sitting president Joe Biden for Nungaray's death, claiming that the incumbent's immigration policy had led to her death. The Biden administration expressed their condolences to the Nungaray family. Secretary of Homeland Security Alejandro Mayorkas stated that the murderers of Nungaray would be held accountable. Nungaray was indirectly mentioned by Trump in the first 2024 presidential debate against Biden on June 27. Her funeral was held on the same day. Houston businessman Jim McIngvale paid for Jocelyn's funeral.

Lieutenant Governor of Texas Dan Patrick announced that he would introduce a law to block bail for capital murder suspects, named "Jocelyn's Law". Texas Senator Ted Cruz announced the "Justice for Jocelyn" act in July 2024 that would introduce harsher measures against undocumented immigrants. Cruz mentioned Nungaray by name at his 2024 Republican National Convention speech on July 17. Trump, who later that year won reelection, mentioned Nungaray in his March 4, 2025, address to a joint session of Congress. During the address, after introducing her mother, he announced an executive order (14229) renaming the Anahuac National Wildlife Refuge to the Jocelyn Nungaray National Wildlife Refuge in her memory. Trump also mentioned her love for nature when renaming the refuge. While addressing the January 2026 United States strikes in Venezuela, which resulted in the capture of Venezuelan President Nicolás Maduro, President Trump cited the murder of Nungaray as a rationale for capturing Maduro. He stated, without evidence, that the crime was committed by the Venezuelan gang Tren de Aragua, claiming the group had been "sent by Maduro to terrorize our people".

== See also ==
- Illegal immigration to the United States and crime
- Murder of Jamiel Shaw II
- Murder of Joshua Wilkerson
- Murder of Laken Riley
