= Kim Ogg =

American lawyer and prosecutor

District Attorney of Harris County
- In office January 1, 2017 – December 31, 2024
- Preceded by: Devon Anderson
- Succeeded by: Sean Teare

Personal details
- Born: Kimbra Kathryn Ogg; 1959 (age 66–67) Houston, Texas, U.S.
- Party: Democratic
- Education: University of Texas, Austin (BA); South Texas College of Law (JD)

Kimbra Kathryn Ogg (born 1959) is an American attorney and former prosecutor. A member of the Democratic Party, from January 1, 2017, to December 31, 2024, she was the District Attorney of Harris County, Texas.

As District Attorney, she was the top law enforcement official responsible for overseeing all prosecutions in Harris County. Before being elected District Attorney, she held a senior role under former District Attorney John B. Holmes Jr. as a Chief Prosecutor, was the City of Houston’s first appointed Anti-Gang Task Force Director, and the executive director of Crime Stoppers of Houston.

== Early life ==
Born in 1959 in Houston, Ogg attended the University of Texas at Austin and South Texas College of Law Houston, graduating with her BA in journalism in 1981 and her JD in 1986 respectively. She is the daughter of Texas legislator and Democrat Jack Ogg and philanthropist Connie Harner Ogg. She and her longtime partner met while studying at South Texas College of Law, and they have one son who attends the University of Texas School of Law.

== Early career ==
Ogg began her legal career working for District Attorney Johnny Holmes in 1987. She was appointed as the first director for Houston's Anti-Gang Task Force in 1994 and unsuccessfully ran for district judge as a Republican in the 1996 election. Ogg was the executive director of Crime Stoppers of Houston from 1999 to 2006 before leaving to practice law with her father.

== Harris County District Attorney ==
Kim Ogg ran on a moderate Democratic platform against Republican incumbent Devon Anderson, using her inauguration ceremony to announce that all misdemeanor marijuana cases would be diverted from arrest or prosecution.

During her tenure, dismissal rates increased greatly with approximately half of felony cases ending in dismissal and over 70% of misdemeanor cases being dismissed by judges. Her staff suggested this may have been a sign of successful pretrial diversion programs, however critics countered this by pointing to a high backlog of people including those charged with misdemeanors. Other criminal attorneys and advocates argued this may have been due to aggressive and overzealous prosecution and poor selection of cases, worsening the case backlog in the Harris County courts.

=== Cannabis reform ===
In early 2017, Ogg announced a new policy: no one caught with under four ounces of cannabis, a misdemeanor amount, would be subjected to arrest and the possibility of a criminal record. In 2022, she spoke in support of arrests for cannabis possession in cases where it coincides with gun possession, because it is illegal in Texas to carry a gun while in possession of cannabis. This resulted in "dozens of cases being dismissed every month" because Ogg's prosecutors were unable to prove that people being arrested were carrying cannabis, which is illegal in Texas, rather than hemp, which is legal.

=== Capital Punishment ===
When running for office in 2016, Ogg stated that her office would seek the death penalty for the "worst of the worst", committing to continuing the practice of previous administrations to seek it less. Ogg later stated she believes in the death penalty. As of the start of Ogg's tenure in 2017, August 2014 was the last time anyone was sent to death row from Harris County. Since then, several defendants were sentenced to death in Harris County during Ogg's tenure, such as Ali Irsan or Ronald Haskell. Ogg's office continued requesting execution dates, which led to the executions of nine death row inmates from Harris County cases. In 2024, Ogg supported shortening death penalty appeals. In a statement after Ogg pursued the death penalty in the high-profile case against the accused murderers of Jocelyn Nungaray, Ogg claimed that Texas prosecutors don't seek the death penalty often enough, saying that "as more and more of these horrific cases come to the forefront, we can expect Texans to demand that their elected district attorneys pursue the death penalty more often in response."

=== Immigration ===
Ogg has been critical of the way immigration has been handled by the Biden administration and ICE. Specifically, Ogg supports stringent detention of illegal immigrants whilst their immigration cases are pending. Ogg supported the “Justice for Jocelyn” act introduced by Sen. Ted Cruz and Rep. Troy Nehls of Texas to ensure ICE detention centers are at maximum capacity before any illegal immigrant who crosses the border is released. The law is named after 12 year old murder victim Jocelyn Nungaray, after her suspected killers who were illegal immigrants were released by ICE. Ogg stated that she became involved in immigration issues due to "a number of murders committed by undocumented illegal aliens, and as a law enforcement official, the top one in the third biggest county in the country, it’s really important to stop the violence."

=== Independent review of police shootings ===
Kim Ogg required that every instance in which a police officer shoots a civilian that the shooting be independently reviewed by prosecutors and that each case be presented to a grand jury to determine whether criminal charges were warranted. Civil Rights Division prosecutors handled the cases and went to the scene of each and every shooting. She said this was done to ensure that the community determined whether an indictment was warranted, and thus the officer be prosecuted, or the shooting be declared legal and thus, the officer cleared.

=== Harding street raid ===
Several Houston Police officers were charged with crimes, including one for murder, after two innocent Houston residents, Dennis Tuttle and his wife Rhogena Nicholas, were shot to death by police in their home. Some defense lawyers have criticized the way Ogg's office handled the Harding Street Raid fallout. Prosecutors asked a judge to make a determination on what material to release to defense lawyers. While many drug arrest cases, based on the work of those police officers, have been dismissed, Ogg's office has chosen to keep nearly all of the property seized from those defendants.

After the raid, advocacy organizations called for Ogg to publish a "no call" list that her office maintained of police officers seen as unreliable potential witnesses due to behavior such as "lying, falsifying evidence, or making racist or violent statements." Her office refused to release both the list and the number of police officers on the list.

=== Prosecution of doctor for theft of COVID-19 vaccines ===
Ogg's office prosecuted Dr. Hasan Gokal, a Pakistani immigrant, for giving 10 doses of COVID-19 vaccines that were about to expire to those not authorized by Harris County Public Effort in an effort to prevent the vaccines going to waste. Ogg characterized Dr. Gokal's actions as "theft" and issued the following statement: "[Dr. Gokal] abused his position to place his friends and family in line in front of people who had gone through the lawful process to be there." One of the people Dr. Gokal gave the vaccine to was his wife. A grand jury declined to indict Dr. Gokal.

=== Campaign contributions controversy ===
Houston Watch reported that she accepted over $25,000 of campaign contributions from Ali Davari, who owns strip clubs. In July 2019, Ogg's office dismissed the criminal charges against an alleged local gambling ring and referred the case by former contract employee Amir Mireskandari to the FBI to ensure the matter was reviewed and there was no appearance of a potential conflict of interest. Federal authorities ultimately found no wrongdoing and did not pursue any criminal charges. Mireskandari and his wife contributed $14,475 in monetary and in-kind donations to Ogg's campaign between 2016 and 2017. He was also a member of Ogg's campaign finance committee.

=== Opposition to misdemeanor cash bail reform settlement ===
Harris County in 2019 enacted reforms that were intended to end the use of cash bail for misdemeanor defendants after a federal judge found the county's bail system to be unconstitutional and a violation of the Fourteenth Amendment. After the county settled the lawsuit, Ogg stood out as a vocal opponent of the misdemeanor bail reforms adopted. She claimed that the reforms provided insufficient clarity on the modified role of prosecutors and that they overemphasized the needs of defendants. She gathered local law enforcement and stood alongside Republican county commissioners in opposition to the plan to create a constitutional bail system that was supported by Democratic commissioners.

After an accidental release of confidential private health data for people detained in the Harris County jail by a new department created to oversee bail reform, Ogg launched a criminal investigation. No one was charged, but people within the department claimed that the investigation hindered efforts to carry out reforms and reduce the jail population.

In 2022, her office released a report claiming that an increase in people charged with violent crimes who are being released from jail due to low bond amounts and then going on to commit more crimes. The Houston Chronicle Editorial board criticized the report, stating in their headline that she was "scapegoating misdemeanor bail reform" for a crime spike when the evidence did not support it. A monitor nominated by agreeing parties in the lawsuit appointed by the court found that misdemeanor bail reform has been successful in reducing misdemeanor arrests and reducing wasteful county spending.

Ogg has criticised Democratic judges for lenient bail policies that she said leads to an increase in violent crime. Ogg was previously criticized after her First Assistant, David Mitcham, told judges they would face a "reckoning" if they did not set higher bonds.

=== Houston Fraud Case ===
Ogg was accused of mishandling and quietly dropping a fraud case against a GOP Activist and attorney Jared Woodfill by investigators within her own office. Her opponent, Sean Teare, debated with her the handling of the case in a conversation with the editorial board of the Houston Chronicle. Ogg did not respond to a list of detailed questions about the inconsistencies between her statements and court records. Ogg's office responded that she “vehemently disagrees” with the Chronicle's portrayal of her comments to the editorial board.

=== Conflicts with local Democratic elected officials ===
Kim Ogg investigated county elected officials and staffers several times after having public disagreements over issues such as bail reform, violence interruption program implementation, and her office's budget. Almost $1 million in taxpayer dollars were spent on legal fees for investigations that never resulted in criminal charges. In August 2020, Harris County Commissioner Rodney Ellis was investigated by her public corruption unit for the unauthorized storage of art, and was later cleared by a grand jury. Ellis was a strong advocate for misdemeanor bail reform and critical of Ogg's late opposition to the settlement.

A Harris County grand jury indicted three senior advisors to Harris County Judge Lina Hidalgo in April 2022 on two public corruption felonies each. The charges, each first-degree felonies, involved allegedly steering an $11 million COVID vaccine outreach campaign to a one-person consulting firm owned by a Democratic strategist. The Texas Rangers investigated the cases. All three charges were eventually dismissed after a review of the evidence by Texas Attorney General Ken Paxton.

In December 2023, Kim Ogg was admonished by the local Democratic Party, which alleged she "abused the power of her office to pursue personal vendettas against her political opponents, sided with Republicans to advance their extremist agenda, and stood in the way of fixing the broken criminal justice system." She was defeated in the following March primary in a landslide.

In August 2024, Ogg endorsed incumbent Republican Senator Ted Cruz against Democratic nominee and Congressman for Texas's 32nd congressional district Colin Allred. She was later featured in an advertisement for Cruz.

In September 2024, Ogg appeared at a political gathering which urged citizens of the Greater Houston Area to "Vote Republican Judges." Earlier that month, she appeared before the Kingwood Tea Party where she criticized several prominent Democrats for intentionally allowing crime to increase to conceal public corruption, adding that she believes those Democrats were allowing a "social experiment" that adversely impacts public safety.
