= List of killings by law enforcement officers in the United States, July 2019 =

This is a list of people reported killed by non-military law enforcement officers in the United States in July 2019, whether in the line of duty or not, and regardless of reason or method. The listing documents the occurrence of a death, making no implications regarding wrongdoing or justification on the part of the person killed or officer involved. Killings are arranged by date of the incident that caused death. Different death dates, if known, are noted in the description. The table below lists 78 people.

== July 2019 ==
Date	Name (age) of deceased	State (city)	Description
2019-07-31	Robert Schneider (46)	Ohio (Cincinnati)	Schneider was shot by police and died in a hospital August 9th.
2019-07-31	Jerry Reeves (42)	Tennessee (Chattanooga)	Reeves was shot and killed by police.
2019-07-31	Troy Petersen (28)	Iowa (Council Bluffs)	Petersen was shot and killed by police officers.
2019-07-31	Donald Joseph Lee (37)	Utah (Roy)	Lee was shot and killed by police officers.
2019-07-31	Mauris Nishanga DeSilva (46)	Texas (Austin)	DeSilva was shot and killed by police. Officer Christopher Taylor convicted on deadly conduct in October 2024. Another officer still faces charges.
2019-07-31	Jose Baca-Olivares (58)	Texas (San Antonio)	Baca-Olivares was shot and killed by police.
2019-07-30	Lane Christopher Martin (31)	Oregon (Portland)	Martinwas shot and killed by police.
2019-07-28	Larry Pettiford (69)	Pennsylvania (Jackson Township)	Pettiford was shot and killed by police officers.
2019-07-28	Adalberto Wolmar Rodriguez (62)	Florida (Boynton Beach)	Rodriguez was shot and killed by police officers.
2019-07-26	Alphonso Zaporta (41)	Connecticut (Hartford)	Zaporta was shot and killed by police.
2019-07-26	Todd Messner (49)	Pennsylvania (Roaring Spring)	Messner was shot and killed by police officers.
2019-07-26	Donald Williams Allamong (56)	South Carolina (Sun City)	Allamong was shot and killed by police.
2019-07-25	Josef Delon Richardson (38)	Louisiana (Port Allen)	Richardson was shot and killed by police.
2019-07-24	Bryant Henry Jr. (25)	Pennsylvania (Philadelphia)	Henry was being chased by officers in a SEPTA station when he fell onto an electrified rail and died. Witnesses say Henry fell after being tased by officers.
2019-07-23	Joshua Vigil (38)	Colorado (Colorado Springs)	Officers responded to reports of a suspicious person, later identified as Joshua Vigil, walking with a gun in the 2200 block of Monterey Road. Vigil reportedly fled in a red Mustang after police confronted him. Police later found the Mustang crashed near the Fountain Garden Apartments, 3165 E. Fountain Blvd., where shots were fired during another encounter with Vigil. He later died at a hospital. The officers involved were Lucas Aragon, Cole Jones and Sgt. Mark Keller.
2019-07-23	Omari Thompson (31)	Pennsylvania (Ross Township)	Thompson was shot and killed by police.
2019-07-23	James Manzo (27)	New Jersey (Asbury Park)	Manzo was shot and killed by police.
2019-07-22	John David Brown (53)	Alabama (Ranburne)	Brown was shot and killed by police.
2019-07-22	Shawan F. Allen (20)	Mississippi (Wesson)	Allen was shot and killed by police.
2019-07-21	Hashim Wilson (28)	Washington (Tacoma)	During a routine traffic stop, officers say Wilson exited his vehicle and pointed a rifle at them. After refusing to comply with the demands of officers, they fired at Wilson, killing him.
2019-07-21	Elisha Lucero (28)	New Mexico (Albuquerque)	Lucero was shot and killed by police.
2019-07-19	Witney Rivera (41)	New Jersey (Pemberton)	Rivera was shot and killed by police.
2019-07-19	Jeffrey Bodie (39)	Texas (League City)	Bodie was shot and killed by police.
2019-07-18	Tony Orland Mills (73)	Oregon (Medford)	Mills was shot and killed by police.
2019-07-18	Patrick Martinez (53)	Colorado (Pueblo)	Martinez was shot and killed by police.
2019-07-18	Samuel Fullerton (39)	Arkansas (Stone County)	Fullerton was shot and killed by police.
2019-07-18	Markeyvion Devonte Cannon (19)	Texas (Fort Worth)	Cannon was shot and killed by police officers.
2019-07-18	Leo Brooks (23)	Louisiana (Metairie)	Brooks was shot and killed by police.
2019-07-17	Roderick Wilson (35)	Alabama (Birmingham)	Wilson was shot and killed by police.
2019-07-17	Mark Anson Schoggins (35)	Oklahoma (McAlester)	Schoggins was shot and killed by police.
2019-07-17	Stephen Murray (52)	California (Modesto)	Murray was shot and killed by SWAT team members after he held his wife hostage and pointed a gun toward her head. All the members involved were justified by DA. One of the SWAT team members involved, Daniel Hutsell, died in a murder suicide in May, 2025, along with his wife.
2019-07-16	Brandon Ray Stansel (36)	Texas (Lake Jackson)	Stansel was shot and killed by police.
2019-07-16	Kelly Danielle Brumley (40)	Texas (Lake Jackson)	Brumley was shot and killed by police.
2019-07-16	Daryl Johannesson (56)	Georgia (Porterdale)	Johannesson was shot and killed by police.
2019-07-16	Jose Javier Gonzalez (52)	California (Chino Hills)	Gonzalez was shot by police and died on July 17th.
2019-07-16	Stephen Fischer (62)	Indiana (Memphis)	Fischer was shot and killed by police.
2019-07-15	Ashanti Pinkney (49)	Maryland (Baltimore)	Pinkney was shot and killed by police.
2019-07-15	Michael Anthony Brand (43)	Utah (Salt Lake City)	Brand was shot and killed by police.
2019-07-14	Dijon D. Watkins (30)	Texas (Dallas)	Watkins was shot and killed by police.
2019-07-14	Onaje Dickinson (20)	Pennsylvania (Penn Hills)	Dickinson was shot and killed by police.
2019-07-14	Blige Sean Christopher Cypress (22)	Florida (Hollywood)	Cypress was shot and killed by police.
2019-07-13	Willem van Spronsen (69)	Washington (Tacoma)	Following a protest at the Northwest Detention Center, van Spronsen was reportedly throwing incendiary devices, causing a vehicles to catch fire. He apparently attempted to ignite a propane tank and set buildings on fire. He was also reportedly carrying a rifle and flares. Four officers fired at van Spronsen. None were wearing body cameras.
2019-07-13	Jamahl Smith (46)	New Jersey (Orange)	Smith was shot and killed by police.
2019-07-13	Derek Luis Antonio Sanchez (35)	Washington (Kirkland)	Sanchez was shot and killed by police.
2019-07-13	Brian H. Benfield (46)	Florida (Coleman)	Benfield was shot and killed by police.
2019-07-11	Logan O. Johnsrud (32)	Wisconsin (Arpin)	Johnsrud was shot and killed by police.
2019-07-10	Frankie Feliciano (33)	Florida (Jacksonville)	Feliciano was shot and killed by police.
2019-07-10	Dennis Edwards (62)	Kansas (Kansas City)	Edwards was shot and killed by police.
2019-07-10	Darrell Allen (32)	California (Adelanto)	Allen was shot and killed by police.
2019-07-09	Grayson Schuessler (26)	California (Citrus Heights)	Schuessler was shot and killed by police.
2019-07-09	Sean Rambert (23)	North Carolina (Greenville)	Rambert was shot and killed by police.
2019-07-09	Jason Harris (36)	California (Rancho Mirage)	Harris was shot and killed by police.
2019-07-09	Anthony James Gonzales (36)	California (Bakersfield)	Gonzales was shot and killed by police.
2019-07-08	Shawn Toney (23)	Ohio (Brooklyn)	Toney was shot and killed by police.
2019-07-07	Johnny M. Vigil (43)	New Mexico (Tularosa)	Vigil was shot and killed by police.
2019-07-07	Thomas Graham (61)	Arkansas (Jacksonville)	Graham was shot and killed by police.
7 July 2019	Johnny W. Dellinger Jr. (41)	Virginia (Timberville)	
2019-07-06	Kareem Omar Morgan (43)	Maryland (Rosedale)	Morgan was shot and killed by police.
2019-07-05	Hannah Williams (17)	California (Anaheim)	Williams was shot and killed by police.
2019-07-05	James C. Pinkston (58)	Missouri (Mountain Grove)	Pinkston was shot and killed by police.
2019-07-05	Angel Ramos Otero (37)	Florida (Ruskin)	Otero was shot and killed by police.
2019-07-05	Joshua Ortiz (21)	California (Oak View)	Ortiz was shot and killed by police.
2019-07-05	Jose Martinez (34)	Utah (West Jordan)	Martinez was shot and killed by police.
2019-07-05	Tymar Crawford (28)	Florida (Pensacola)	Crawford was shot and killed by police officers.
2019-07-04	Leonel Mendez (34)	Colorado (Lakewood)	Mendez was shot and killed by police.
2019-07-04	Olivio Sandoval Diaz (47)	Georgia (Roswell)	Diaz was shot and killed by police.
2019-07-03	Li Xi Wang (49)	California (Chino)	Wang was shot and killed by police.
2019-07-03	Christine Venegas (38)	Texas (El Paso)	Venegas was shot and killed by police.
2019-07-03	Jonathan Pingel (26)	Iowa (West Des Moines)	Pingel was shot and killed by police.
2019-07-03	Mark A. Naugle (53)	Indiana (Salem)	Naugle was shot and killed by police.
3 July 2019	Stonechild Chiefstick (39)	Washington (Poulsbo, Washington)	According to officers, Chiefstick had been threatening people with a screwdriver. An officer made contact with Chiefstick, at which point a scuffle ensued and the officer's body camera was knocked off. Two shots were then fired at Chiefstick, killing him.
2019-07-02	Chad Williams (44)	Michigan (Bagley Township)	Williams was shot and killed by police.
2019-07-02	Isaiah Robinson (39)	Ohio (Elyria)	Robinson was shot and killed by police.
2019-07-02	Isak Abdirahman Aden (23)	Minnesota (Eagan)	Police were called following a domestic dispute between 23-year-old Somali American Isak Aden and his girlfriend. Following a foot chase, officers from Bloomington, Eagan, Burnsville, and Edina responded, surrounding Aden with K-9 Units and SWAT teams. After hours of negotiation, officers fired less-lethal rounds and several flash bangs at Aden just before four Bloomington police officers and one from Eagan shot him 11 times, ending his life. No charges were filed against the officers. Aden's family filed a civil rights lawsuit in July 2020.
2019-07-01	Terry Allen "Bubba" Payne (52)	Mississippi (Pontotoc County)	Payne was shot and killed by police.
1 July 2019	Aaron Hong (23)	Georgia (Athens, Georgia)	Athens-Clarke County police responded to a call of a man acting in a erratic and threatening manner holding a butcher knife and covered in blood. Arriving at the scene officers confronted the man (later identified as Aaron Hong) who disregarded their demands to drop the weapon and charged at one of the officers, which the latter responded to by shooting and striking Hong multiple times. Despite this Hong managed to wrestle the firearm from the officer, and another officer also started shooting at the man. Despite receiving treatment, Hong died shortly after. Paramedics also confirmed that the blood Hong was covered in prior to the confrontation was his own.
2019-07-01	Ben Fields (67)	Florida (Port St. Lucie)	Fields was shot and killed by police.
2019-07-01	Christopher James Barela (22)	Colorado (Denver)	Barela was shot and killed by police.

== See also ==
- Death in custody § United States
- Henry A. Wallace Police Crime Public Database
- List of cases of police brutality
- List of countries with annual rates and counts for killings by law enforcement officers
- List of law enforcement officers killed in the line of duty in the United States
- List of law enforcement officers convicted for an on-duty killing in the United States
- List of shootings by US immigration agents
- List of police reforms related to the George Floyd protests
- List of unarmed African Americans killed by law enforcement officers in the United States
- Lists of killings by law enforcement officers
- Police brutality in the United States
- Police misconduct § United States
- Police riot § United States
- Police use of deadly force in the United States
