= North Houston, Texas =

Unincorporated community in Texas, US

Coordinates: 29°55′32″N 95°30′55″W

North Houston is an unincorporated community in Harris County, Texas, United States, that was formerly a distinct community.

== Government and infrastructure ==
The area is served by Harris County Sheriff's Office District I Patrol, headquartered from the Cypresswood Substation at 6831 Cypresswood Drive. The 249 Storefront is located at 7614 Fallbrook Drive in the North Houston community.

== Education ==
The community is serviced by the Cyfair Independent School District.

== Notable people ==
- Jocelyn Nungaray, killed in 2024
