= Junius Ralph Magee =

American Methodist bishop

Junius Ralph Magee was a bishop of the Methodist Episcopal Church and The Methodist Church, elected in 1932.

== Birth and family ==
He was born 3 June 1880 in Maquoketa, Iowa, the son of John Calvin and Jane Amelia (Cole) Magee. Junius married Harriet Ammie Keeler 10 September 1902. They had two children: J. Homer and Dorothy J. Mrs. Magee died in October 1943.

== Education ==
Junius was educated at the Iowa State Teachers College, earning the B.Di. degree in 1901. He continued his education at Morningside College, earning the Ph.B. degree in 1904. He then entered the Boston University School of Theology, earning the S.T.B. degree in 1910. Junius was a member of the honorary fraternities Pi Gamma Mu and Pi Kappa Delta.

== Honorary degrees ==
Bishop Magee was awarded the LL.D. degree in 1931 by his alma mater, Morningside College. Upper Iowas University honored him with the D.D. degree in 1921. The College of Puget Sound awarded him the L.H.D. in 1932.

== Ordained ministry ==
Rev. Magee was ordained in the M.E. Church in 1906. He served the following appointments in Iowa: Rustin Ave. in Sioux City (1902–04); Paullina (1904–07). Rev. Magee then served these appointments in Massachusetts: Falmouth (1907–11); First Church, Taunton (1911–14); Daniel Dorchester Memorial Church, Boston (1914–19); St. Mark's Church, Brookline (1919–21). Rev. Magee then transferred to Washington state, where he served these appointments: First Church, Seattle (1921–28); then Superintendent of the Seattle District (1929–32). Rev. Magee was elected a delegate to General Conferences in 1928 and 1932.

== Episcopal ministry ==
Upon his election to the Episcopacy, Bishop Magee was assigned to the St. Paul episcopal area (1932–39). In the newly formed Methodist Church, Bishop Magee was assigned the Des Moines Area (1939–44), followed by the Chicago Area (1944- ).

== Service to the Greater Church and Community ==
As Bishop Magee also served as President of the Board of Pensions of The Methodist Church, Inc. in Illinois, and of the Board of Education of the Church. He served as a member of the Board of Missions, the Board of Lay Activities, and the Commission on Overseas Relief.

In St. Paul, Bishop Magee served as the President of Hamline University, 1933-34. In Seattle he served on the Mayor's Commission on Unemployment (1931). In Chicago he served on the Mayor's V-E Day Committee.

== See also ==
- List of bishops of the United Methodist Church
