= Obiwu =

Nigerian American writer and professor (born 1962)

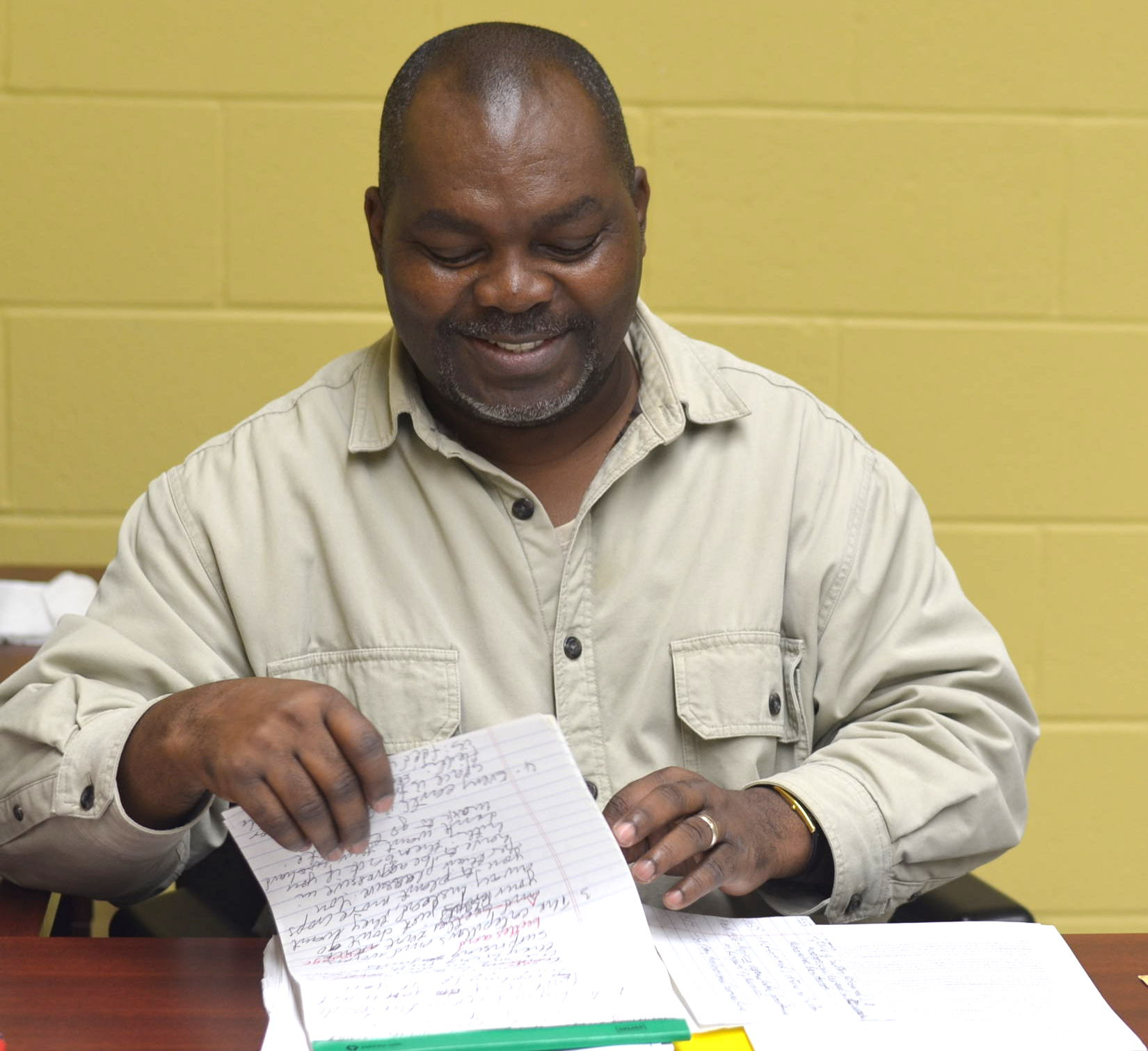
- Obiwu in 2015 at Central State University
- Born: Obioma Paul Iwuanyanwu; 10 September 1962 (age 64); Umuahia, Abia State, Nigeria
- Occupations: Writer, Professor of World Literature and Critical Theory, Central State University
- Awards: Resolution Recognition Greene County Board of Commissioners; Fellow of International School of Theory in the Humanities; Phi Beta Delta Honor Society for International Scholars.

Academic background
- Education: Syracuse University; University of Jos; Abia State University
- Doctoral advisors: Silvio A. Torres-Saillant, Michael J. C. Echeruo, Gregg Lambert

Academic work
- Notable works: The Critical Imagination in African Literature, Tigress at Full Moon

Obioma Paul Iwuanyanwu (born 1962) known mononymously as Obiwu, is a Nigerian American writer and professor. He is a survivor of the Igbo genocide in Nigeria (1966–1970), and teaches World Literature and Critical Theory in the Humanities Department at Central State University, Ohio, United States.

== Biography ==
Obiwu was born in Umuahia, the capital of Abia State in southeastern Nigeria. His parents, Ichie Njoku Iwuanyanwu and Lolo Igbeaku Iwuanyanwu, were Catholics and ran their own hotel and restaurant business. Obiwu's early schooling was interrupted by the violent conflicts that erupted in Nigeria with the pogrom in Northern Nigeria (1966) and the Biafran War (1967–70). Caught in the bombardment of Umuahia by the Nigerian enemy planes, Obiwu's family was forced to flee the city in 1968 to his ancestral hometown of Umueze II, Ehime Mbano, in the present Imo State till the end of the war. He was three years of age when the Nigerian genocide against the Igbo people began, and four when the Civil War broke out.

These conflicts, which claimed an estimated three million lives, affected his family deeply and left an indelible impression on Obiwu. Like thousands of other children between the ages of one and five, Obiwu suffered from the effects of kwashiorkor, a consequence of the Nigerian government's blockade of the importation of food and relief materials into Biafra.

He went on to study English language and literature at Imo State University (now Abia State University). He graduated with honors in 1986, with minors in History and Linguistics. For his one-year post-degree National Youth Service, he taught at the Government Secondary School in Madagali, a border town below the Mandara Mountain chain between Northern Nigeria and Northern Cameroon.

In 1990, Obiwu gained his master's degree from the University of Jos with a thesis on the novels of George Orwell and Wole Soyinka. He was then recruited at the University of Jos as a lecturer in the English Department where he taught poetry, drama, fiction, and creative writing. During his time at the University of Jos, Obiwu published two books: Rituals of the Sun (poetry) and Igbos of Northern Nigeria (pioneer diaspora study).

In 1997, Obiwu moved to America to resume his doctoral studies at Syracuse University, later earning his PhD in English and Textual Studies. In 2002, he started teaching in the Humanities Department at Central State University (CSU) in Wilberforce, Ohio. In 2005, he redirected the focus of the CSU Writing Center, and the same year he was appointed the coach of the CSU team that won the semi-finalist trophy at the 2006 Honda Campus All-Star Challenge National Championship Tournament in Orlando, Florida. Some of his former students, such as the writer Helon Habila, have gone on to distinguished careers.

Obiwu is co-editor and contributor to The Critical Imagination in African Literature: Essays in Honor of Michael J. C. Echeruo. “Showcasing a rich diversity of cultural and academic backgrounds […and] varied in modes of inquiry, the essays [contained in the book] are unified in their ambition to explore new theoretical directions, reinvigorating the conversation around how African literature is read and studied”.

Obiwu currently lives in Xenia with his wife, Ifeyinwa, and their children.

== Selected works ==
=== Books ===
- The Critical Imagination in African Literature: Essays in Honor of Michael J. C. Echeruo, Maik Nwosu and Obiwu (eds), 2015, ISBN 9780815633877
- Tigress at Full Moon, 2012, ISBN 9780979085840
- Igbos of Northern Nigeria, 1996, ISBN 9789783256231
- Rituals of the Sun, 1992, ISBN 9789783089532

=== Articles ===
- "Cultural Icon: Michael J. C. Echeruo and the African Academy". In The Critical Imagination in African Literature: Essays in Honor of Michael J. C. Echeruo. Maik Nwosu and Obiwu (eds). Syracuse, NY: Syracuse University Press, 2015. 1–21.
- "Jacques Lacan in Africa: Travel, Moroccan Cemetery, Egyptian Hieroglyphics, and Other Passions of Theory". In The Critical Imagination in African Literature: Essays in Honor of Michael J. C. Echeruo. Maik Nwosu and Obiwu (eds). Syracuse, NY: Syracuse University Press, 2015. 75–93.
- "Roy Campell and the Animal Father". Handbook of Social Justice. Augustus Kakanowski and Marijus Narusevich (eds). New York: Nova Science Pub, 2009. 187–201.
- "The Pan-African Brotherhood of Langston Hughes and Nnamdi Azikiwe". Dialectical Anthropology 31.1–3 (November 2007):143–165.
- "Ben Obumselu: The Responsible Critic". The Guardian Literary Series, Lagos (19 June 1993): 19.

=== Tigress at Full Moon ===
In 2012, Obiwu published his second collection of poetry, Tigress at Full Moon. Tigress is compiled from a body of “pieces ranging over a decade and a half of exile, in other words poems solely written in the US”. A review by Roger W. Hecht states: "These poems are the embodiment of immortal imagination impregnated with the spirit of creativity…, they chant us to see the vision and imagine ourselves in it." Furthermore, Chielozona Eze points out that he found “the poet [Obiwu] powerful when he engages issues closest to him and his native culture, less so in those instances when a poem becomes a foil for engaging some of those discourses that interest the poet”.

== Scholarly work ==
=== Jacques Lacan ===
With his PhD dissertation, Obiwu became one of only two Africans to have written “book-length literary interventions" on Lacan, the other being the South African Teresa Dovey. His long-awaited dissertation entitled “In the Name of the Father: Lacanian Reading of Four White South African Writers,” was written under the direction of Silvio A. Torres-Saillant, Michael J. C. Echeruo, Gregg Lambert, and Cecil Abrahams. Obiwu would later write the essay "Jacques Lacan in Africa", to point out the often neglected role that Lacan's trips to Africa had played in shaping his praxis of psychoanalysis.

== Public intellectual ==
=== Kingston controversy on Equiano ===
The international conference on “Olaudah Equiano: Representation and Reality,” which was held on 22 March 2003, at Kingston University, Kingston upon Thames, United Kingdom, was an occasion for a widely reported controversy in which Obiwu mounted a challenge to Vincent Carretta's claim that Equiano had misrepresented his birthplace in his famous slave narrative. Writing on the disputation in the Nigeria World, London-based medical doctor and writer Ike Anya reports that "[Obiwu] questioned Carretta’s motives in seeking to demystify Equiano from a very weak evidence base and hinted that race, finance and fame were possible motives ... [He] pointed out the logical flaws in Carretta’s argument and suggested that Carretta visit Africa for further research."

Mark Stein's review of the conference for Early American Literature, notes that "Obiwu Iwuanyanwu (Central State, Wilberforce, Ohio) went as far as accusing those who examine Equiano's African birth of professing 'anti-Equiano scholarship' with the potential to jeopardize the 'enduring human truth' of Equiano's text". Stephen Manning of The Associated Press interviewed Obiwu for his report on the conference: "'[Carretta's] kind of scholarship, which invests excessive energy in pseudo-detective work, devotes too little time to critical analysis, disavows scholarly fellowship and indulges in vast publicity gamesmanship,' Obiwu Iwuanyanwu, who spoke at the conference and teaches at Central State University in Ohio, wrote in an e-mail”.

=== London lecture on Igbo sex ===
On 17–18 April 2015, 12 years after the Equiano controversy, Obiwu returned to the United Kingdom to present what he termed a preliminary intervention on Igbo sex at "The 4th Annual International Igbo Conference: Igbo Womanhood, Womanbeing and Personhood". The conference was held at the School of Oriental and African Studies (SOAS), University of London.

Obiwu described his presentation, entitled "Igbo Sex: The Discovery, Discourse, and Domains of Intimacy among the Igbo", as a cultural history of intimacy among the Igbo people of southeast Nigeria. He opined that "There are two things that make great civilization: It is where the people build their toilets (as the analyst Lacan observes) and how they make love." He went on to say, “Almost every important tradition in the world has a map of the people's sexual history. My Igbo people have no documented archeology of sex beyond the variegated folklores of the diverse communities, regions, and dialects of the land. So, I thought it is about time we started getting the idea a bit clearer.” Obiwu stated that the study stands on the shoulders of such masters of global sexual history as Sigmund Freud, Marie Bonaparte, D. H. Lawrence, Jacques Lacan, Simone de Beauvoir, Michel Foucault, Luce Irigaray, and Rabbi Shmuley Boteach. The lecture was subsequently published on YouTube.

=== On Chimamanda Ngozi Adichie's writing models ===
Following Chimamanda Ngozi Adichie's winning the 2007 Orange Prize for Fiction with her sophomore novel Half of a Yellow Sun, Obiwu sought to contextualize Adichie's writing both in terms of her historical relations to Chinua Achebe and Olaudah Equiano and in terms of her shared social consciousness with the South African Jewish novelist Nadine Gordimer.

Responding to Obiwu's tribute to Adichie in his Encyclopædia Britannica Blog, J. E. Luebering highlighted the "provocative" nature of inserting Equiano "at the core of Nigerian literature".

Adichie, on the other hand, was more expansive in responding to her comparison with Gordimer in her interview with Renee Shea in the Kenyon Review: “I didn't realize that [Obiwu] had said that. I would say he meant it only half jokingly... I wonder if it's not that classic thing of an African female novelist. I often get Ama Ata Aidoo or Flora Nwapa. I have a deep respect for Gordimer and what she stands for and what she is. Her fiction is, to use that overloaded word, amazing, in many ways”.

== Awards ==
- 2009 – First Prize, Donatus Nwoga Prize for Literary Criticism in Poetry, Abuja Writers Forum. Winning Essay: “The Ecopoetics of Christopher Okigbo and Ezra Pound”.
- 2008 – Faculty Award, Charanjit Rangi Leadership Award for Faculty Professional Excellence, College of Arts and Sciences, Central State University (April 2).
- 2007 – 'Applause' Award, Xenia Daily Gazette], 140.201 (Tuesday, 1 May): 1.
- 2007 – Resolution Recognition No. 07-4-12-31, Greene County Board of Commissioners, Greene County, Ohio.
- 2000 – Phi Beta Delta Honor Society for International Scholars.
- 1998 – Fellow, International School of Theory in the Humanities at Santiago de Compostela, Spain.
