= List of West Texas A&M University people =

The following is a list of notable people associated with West Texas A&M University, located in the American city of Canyon, Texas.

== Notable alumni ==
=== Politics and government ===
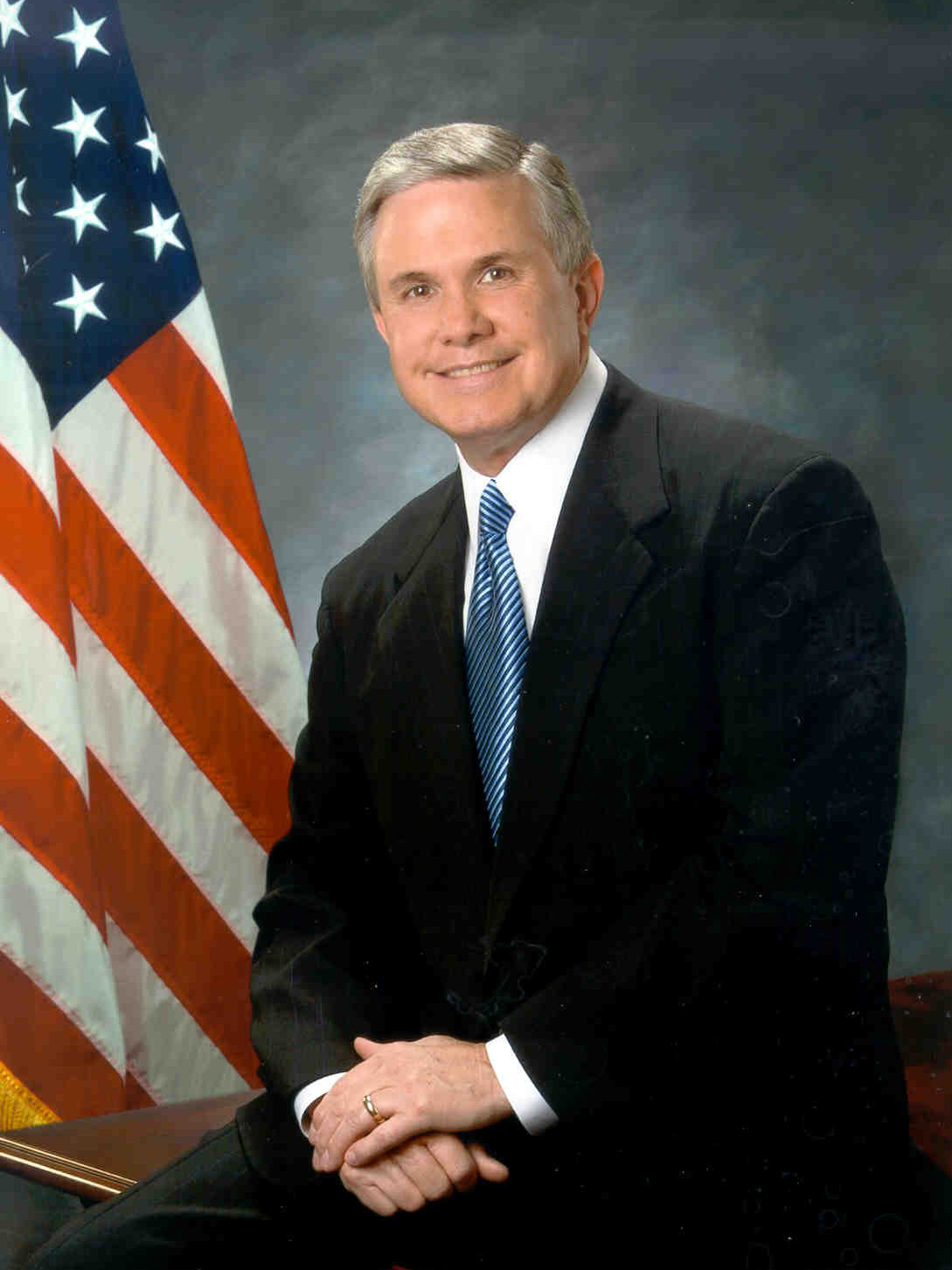
Larry Combest, Member of the U.S. House of Representatives from Texas's 19th district

- Ulane Bonnel, naval historian
- Larry Combest, former U.S. representative
- Jesse Cross, US Army general
- Angie Debo, historian (faculty member, 1924–1933)
- Anita Thigpen Perry, First Lady of Texas
- Bill Sarpalius, politician
- John T. Smithee, Texas state representative since 1985

=== Media and arts ===
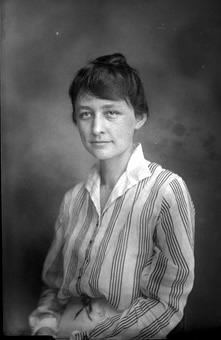
Georgia O'Keeffe, head of the WTAMU Art Department, 1916–1918

- Jennifer Archer, author
- Candace Camp, author
- René Clausen, composer and choral director (faculty member)
- Georgia O'Keeffe, artist (faculty member)
- The Otwell Twins, musicians and businessmen from Tulia and Amarillo
- Bruce Robison, hit country songwriter ("Travelin' Soldier", "Angry All The Time", "Desperately") and singer
- Red Steagall, country singer and Western poet
- French Stewart, actor

=== Business ===
- William R. Klesse, CEO and president of Valero Energy Corporation
- Donald E. Powell, former chairman of the FDIC; current Federal Coordinator of Gulf Coast Rebuilding

=== Education ===
- John S. Goff, government and history professor
- Helen Neal, in 1962 became the first black graduate

=== Athletes and coaches ===
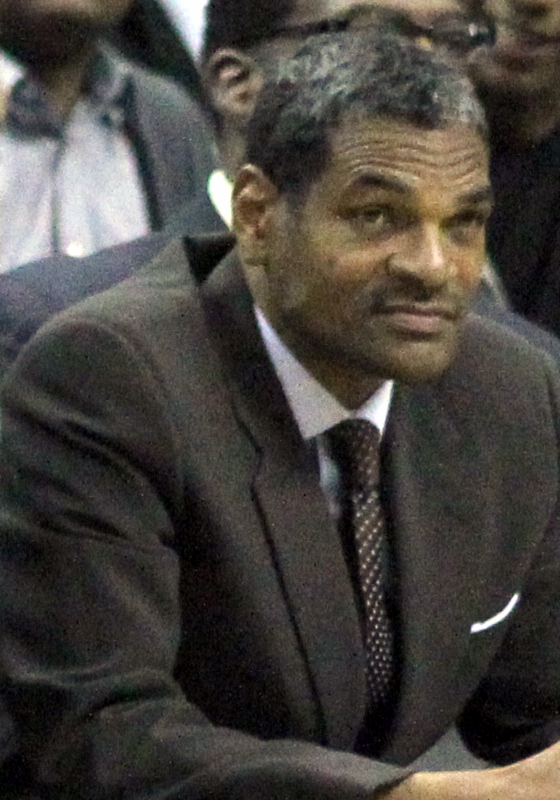
Maurice Cheeks, professional basketball player/coach

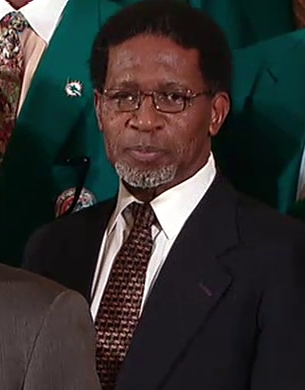
Mercury Morris, professional football player

- Anthony Armstrong, NFL player
- Davy Arnaud, soccer player
- John Ayers, NFL player
- Dalton Bell, NFL player
- Tully Blanchard, professional wrestler
- Bryan Braman, NFL player
- Bruiser Brody (Frank Goodish), COFL & TFL player, professional wrestler
- Ray Brown, NFL player
- Sergio Castillo, NFL player
- Maurice Cheeks, Hall of Fame NBA player and coach
- Ted DiBiase, professional wrestler (did not graduate)
- Carolyn Dorin-Ballard, professional ten-pin bowler who won 20 titles on the PWBA tour and 2 more in the PBA Women's Series
- Bobby Duncum Sr., NFL player, professional wrestler
- Manny Fernandez, professional wrestler
- Joe Fortenberry, Olympic basketball player
- Dory Funk Jr., professional wrestler
- Terry Funk, actor, professional wrestler
- Qua Grant, basketball player in the Israeli Basketball Premier League
- Stan Hansen, professional wrestler
- Heath Herring (attended), football player and wrestler; retired mixed martial artist fighter, formerly for the Ultimate Fighting Championship
- Alondra Johnson, Canadian Football League player
- Rellie Kaputin, Olympic track and field athlete
- Steve Kragthorpe, college football head coach
- Kareem Larrimore, NFL player
- Ryan Leaf, NFL player and quarterbacks coach (faculty member)
- Jerry Logan, NFL player
- Charly Martin, NFL player
- Mickey Matthews, college football head coach
- Reggie McElroy, NFL player
- Mercury Morris, NFL player
- Keith Null, NFL player
- Jesse Powell, NFL player
- Dusty Rhodes, COFL player, professional wrestler
- Khiry Robinson, NFL player
- Tito Santana (Merced Solis), CFL player, professional wrestler
- Mike Scroggins, professional ten-pin bowler who has won 8 titles (including 2 majors) on the PBA Tour
- Marsha Sharp, head coach of the Texas Tech Lady Raiders basketball team
- Jerry Simmons, tennis coach
- Eugene Sims, NFL player
- Duane Thomas, NFL player
- Chaun Thompson, NFL player
- Dustin Vaughan, NFL player
- J'Marcus Webb, NFL player
- Barry Windham, professional wrestler (did not graduate)

== See also ==
- List of people from Texas
- West Texas A&M University
