= 1958 Texas gubernatorial election =

1958 Texas Democratic gubernatorial primary election
- November 4, 1958
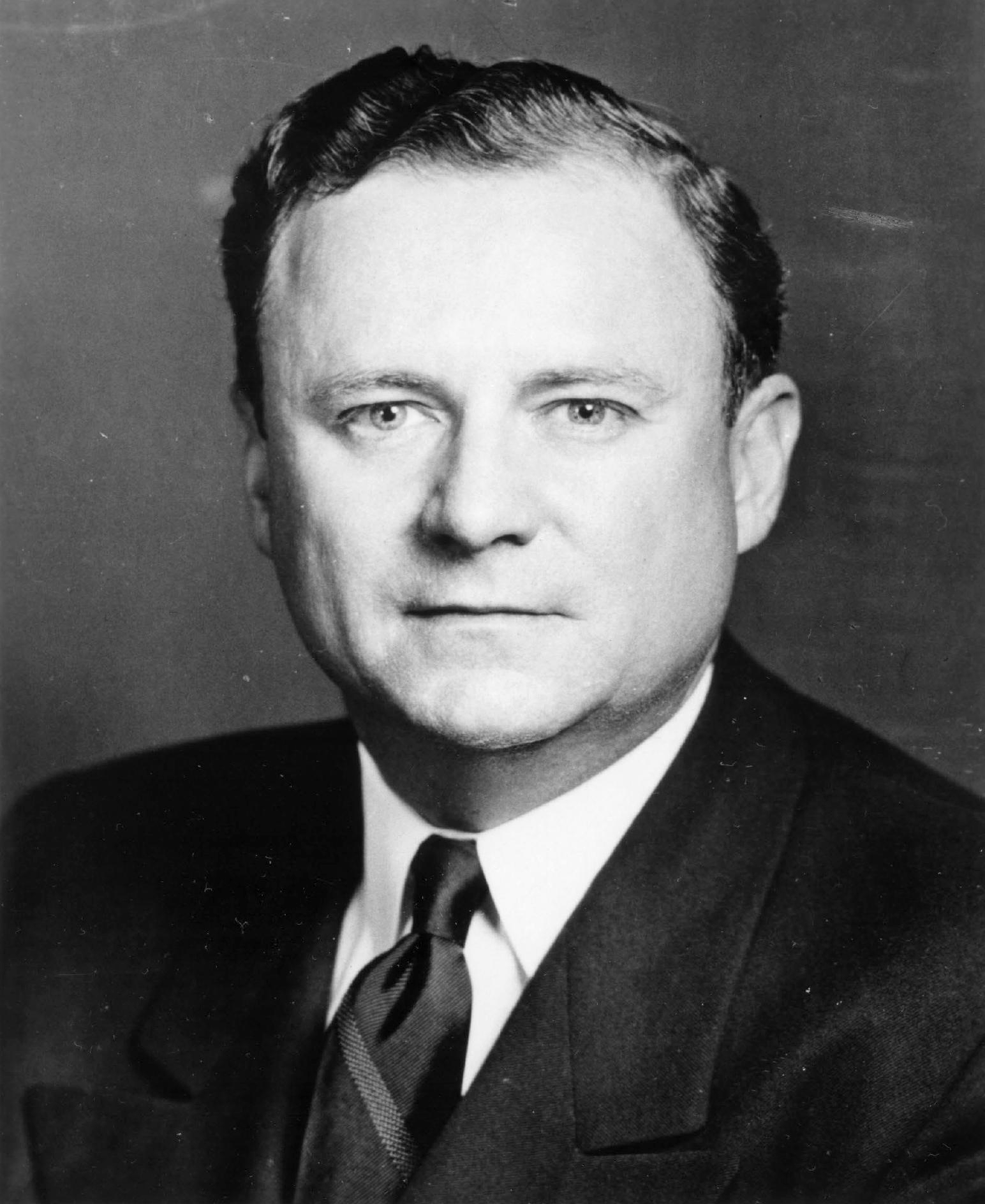

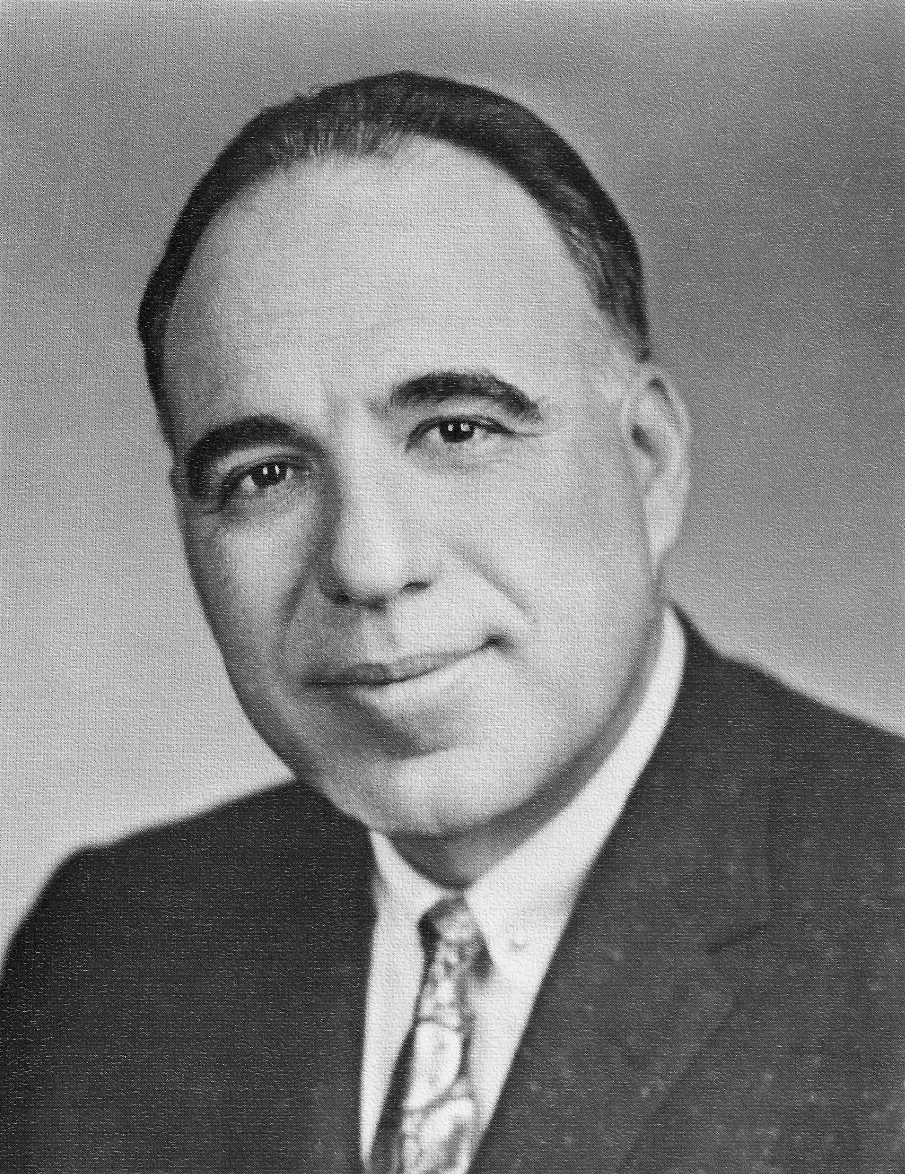

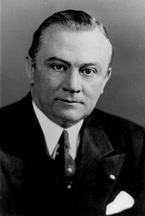
Nominee	Price Daniel	Henry B. González	W. Lee O'Daniel
Party	Democratic	Democratic	Democratic
Popular vote	799,107	246,969	238,767
Percentage	60.61%	18.73%	18.11%
- County results Daniel: 40–50% 50–60% 60–70% 70–80% González: 40–50% 50–60% 60–70% 70–80% >90% O'Daniel: 60–70%
Governor before election
Price Daniel
Democratic
Elected Governor
Price Daniel
Democratic

The 1958 Texas gubernatorial election was held on November 4, 1958, to elect the governor of Texas. Incumbent Democratic governor Price Daniel was reelected a second term, winning 88% of the vote to Republican Edwin Mayer's 12%.

To date, this was the last election in which a candidate for Governor of Texas received more than 75% of the vote.

== Primaries ==
=== Democratic ===
==== Candidates ====
- Price Daniel, incumbent governor, former United States Senator from Texas (1953-1957), former Texas Attorney General (1947-1953), former Speaker of the Texas House of Representatives (1943-1945)
- Henry B. González, state senator from the 26th district, former San Antonio councilmember (1953-1956)
- W. Lee O'Daniel, former governor (1939-1941), former United States Senator (1941-1949), unsuccessful candidate for Democratic nomination for governor in 1956
- Joe A. Irwin, insurance salesman

Democratic primary results
Party	Candidate	Votes	%
Democratic	Price Daniel (incumbent)	799,107	60.61%
Democratic	Henry B. González	246,969	18.73%
Democratic	W. Lee O'Daniel	238,767	18.11%
Democratic	Joe A. Irwin	33,643	2.55%
Total votes		1,318,486	100.00%

=== Constitution Party ===
During the 1958 elections, the Constitution Party, a small right-wing third party which formed in 1952, had more candidates for the statewide slate than the Republican party. The party attempted to nominate former governor W. Lee O'Daniel as their candidate, but the state's "sore loser" law disqualified him from appearing on the ballot due to his participation in the Democratic primary.

== General election ==
General election results
Party	Candidate	Votes	%
Democratic	Price Daniel (incumbent)	695,779	88.09%
Republican	Edwin S. Mayer	94,086	11.91%
Total votes		789,865	100.00%
Democratic hold			
