= Roger E. Nebergall =

American speech professor

- Born: July 3, 1926; Davenport, Iowa
- Died: April 13, 1994 (aged 67)
- Education: Augustana College; Bradley University; University of Illinois
- Occupation: Speech professor
- Employers: University of Oklahoma; University of Illinois at Urbana–Champaign

Roger E. Nebergall (July 3, 1926 – April 13, 1994) was an American speech professor at the University of Oklahoma and the University of Illinois at Urbana–Champaign.

== Early life and education ==
Roger E. Nebergall was born on July 3, 1926, in Davenport, Iowa. He served in the United States Navy during World War II.

Nebergall graduated from Augustana College in 1949, received a master's degree from Bradley University in 1951, and received a doctorate from the University of Illinois in 1956.

== Academic career ==
In 1957, Nebergall became an assistant professor of speech at the University of Oklahoma. He served as the chairman of the speech department until 1968.

Nebergall co-authored the book Attitude and Attitude Change: The Social Judgment-Involvement Approach with Carolyn W. Sherif and Muzafer Sherif, which was published in 1965. In 1966, Nebergall was awarded a scholarship prize by the Speech Association of America for the book.

In 1969, Nebergall became a professor and chairman of the speech department at the University of Illinois at Urbana–Champaign. He was the chairman of the speech department until 1978 and worked as a professor until 1990.

From 1975 to 1977, Nebergall was editor of the academic journal Communication Monographs.

Nebergall was a member of the Speech Association of America, the Central States Speech Association, and the Oklahoma Speech Association. He was also a member of Pi Kappa Alpha and Pi Kappa Delta.

== Political activities ==
Nebergall was active in the Republican Party. In 1958, Nebergall was elected president of the Cleveland County Political Forum.

== Personal life and death ==
In 1958, Nebergall married Nelda L. Cawthon. She died in 1990. Nebergall was a Freemason.

Nebergall died on April 13, 1994. He was 67 years old.
