= Price Daniel =

American judge and politician (1910–1988)

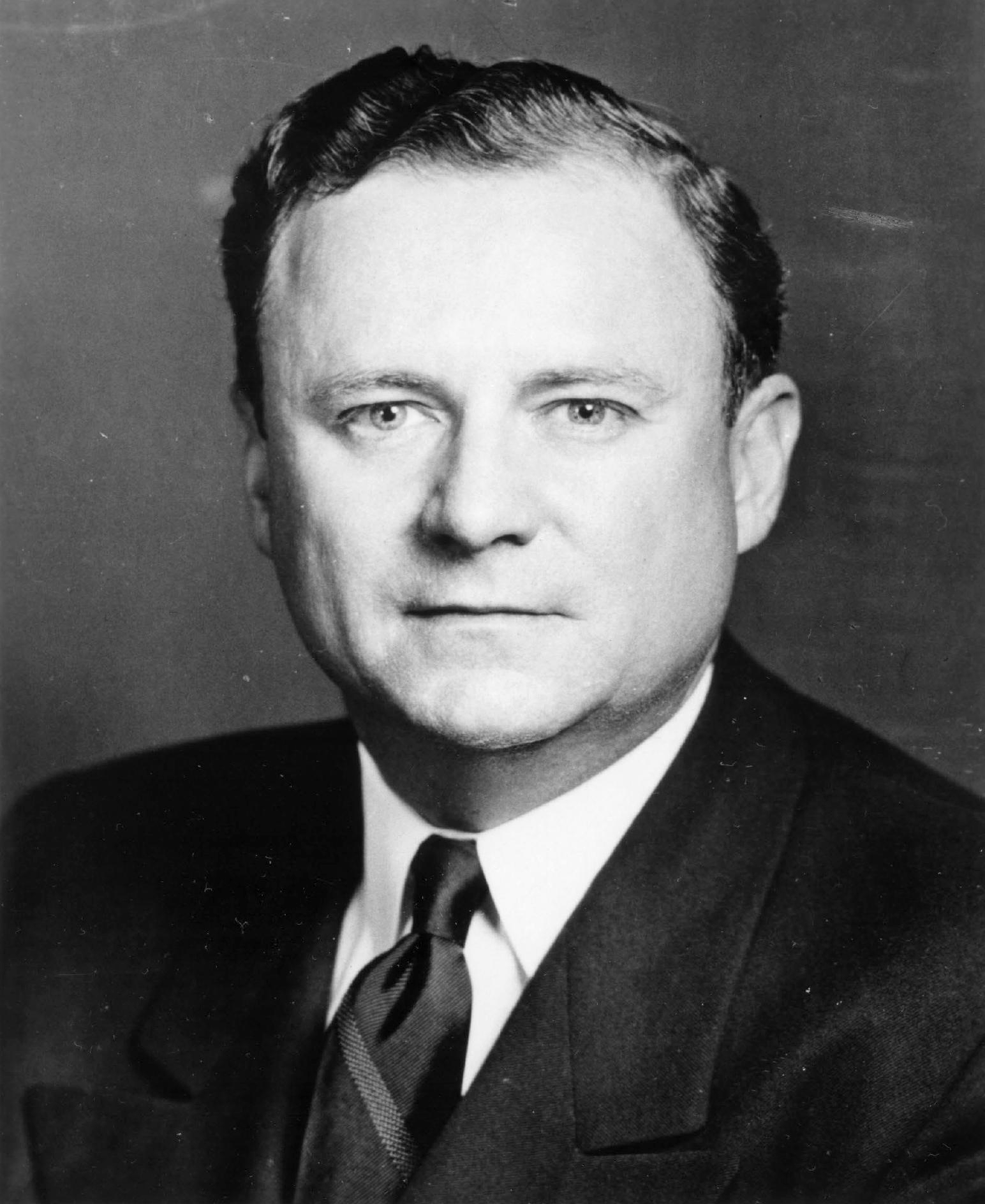
- Daniel c. 1952

Justice of the Supreme Court of Texas
- In office January 1, 1971 – December 31, 1978
- Appointed by: Preston Smith
- Preceded by: Clyde Smith
- Succeeded by: Franklin Spears

Director of the Office of Emergency Preparedness
- In office October 9, 1967 – January 20, 1969*
- President: Lyndon B. Johnson
- Preceded by: C. Farris Bryant
- Succeeded by: George Lincoln

38th Governor of Texas
- In office January 15, 1957 – January 15, 1963
- Lieutenant: Ben Ramsey
- Preceded by: Allan Shivers
- Succeeded by: John Connally

United States Senator from Texas
- In office January 3, 1953 – January 14, 1957
- Preceded by: Tom Connally
- Succeeded by: William A. Blakley

39th Attorney General of Texas
- In office January 21, 1947 – January 1, 1953
- Governor: Beauford H. Jester; Allan Shivers
- Preceded by: Grover Sellers
- Succeeded by: John Ben Shepperd

Speaker of the Texas House of Representatives
- In office January 12, 1943 – January 9, 1945
- Preceded by: Homer Leonard
- Succeeded by: Claud Gilmer

Member of the Texas House of Representatives from the 14th district
- In office January 10, 1939 – January 9, 1945
- Preceded by: Alfred Roark
- Succeeded by: David Read

Personal details
- Born: Marion Price Daniel; October 10, 1910 Dayton, Texas, U.S.
- Died: August 25, 1988 (aged 77) Liberty, Texas, U.S.
- Party: Democratic
- Spouse: Jean Houston Baldwin (m. 1940)
- Children: 4, including Price Jr.
- Relatives: Bill Daniel (brother)
- Education: Baylor University (BA, LLB)

Military service
- Allegiance: United States
- Branch/service: United States Army; United States Marine Corps
- Years of service: 1943–1946
- Rank: Second Lieutenant
- Battles/wars: World War II
- Known as the Office of Emergency Planning until October 21, 1968.

Marion Price Daniel Sr. (October 10, 1910 – August 25, 1988) was an American jurist and politician who served as a U.S. senator and the 38th governor of Texas. A member of the Democratic Party, he was appointed by President Lyndon B. Johnson to be a member of the National Security Council, Director of the Office of Emergency Preparedness, and Assistant to the President for Federal-State Relations. Daniel also served as Associate Justice of the Texas Supreme Court.

== Early life ==
Marion Price Daniel Sr. (properly Marion Price Daniel II) was born October 10, 1910, in Dayton, Texas, to Marion Price Daniel Sr. (1882–1937) and Nannie Blanch Partlow (1886–1955), in Liberty Texas. He was the eldest child. Sister Ellen Virginia Daniel was born in 1912, and brother William Partlow Daniel in 1915. Price, as he was commonly known, was married to Jean Houston Baldwin, great-great-granddaughter of legendary Texas figure Sam Houston. As a teenager Daniel was a reporter for the Fort Worth Star-Telegram. He put himself through law school at Baylor University by working as a janitor and dishwasher, and also working at the Waco News Tribune. He received his degree in 1932. After graduation he established a practice in Liberty County and often accepted livestock and acreage for his fees.

== Texas House of Representatives ==
In 1938, he was elected to the Texas House of Representatives. He was subsequently re-elected twice, serving in the 46th, 47th, and 48th legislature from January 10, 1939, until January 9, 1945. Daniel opposed Texas adopting a sales tax.

He served on these committees during the 46th legislature (January 10 – June 21, 1939): judiciary; oil, gas, and mining; privileges, suffrage, and elections (vice chair); and public lands and buildings.

He served on these committees during the 47th legislature (January 14 – July 3, 1941, and September 9–19, 1941): judiciary; privileges, suffrage, and elections; public lands and buildings (vice chair); and revenue and taxation.

He was elected as Speaker of the House for the 48th legislature (January 12 – May 11, 1943).

== World War II military service ==
When the legislature adjourned in May 1943, Daniel waived his draft exemption and enlisted in the United States Army, serving in the Security Intelligence Corps. In this capacity, he saw service in Amarillo, Texas, Pine Bluff, Arkansas, and Baton Rouge, Louisiana. He received his Second Lieutenant commission in 1944 after training at the Judge Advocate General Officers School in Ann Arbor, Michigan, afterwards becoming an instructor at the Army School for Personnel Services in Lexington, Virginia.

The Army shared Daniel with the United States Marine Corps in 1945, the latter sending him to Sasebo, Nagasaki, Japan to set up a Marine Personnel School. He received "outstanding authority" citations from both branches of service, and was discharged in May 1946.

== Texas Attorney General ==
Price returned to Texas after his military service and won the seat of Texas Attorney General.

As Texas State Attorney General, he argued the 1946 submerged lands ownership lawsuit United States v. California, 332 U.S. 19 before the Supreme Court of the United States in 1947, on behalf of the coastal states. The Supreme Court decided against California on June 23, 1947.

Daniel defended the University of Texas law school in the 1950 Sweatt v. Painter desegregation case. Herman Marion Sweatt, a black student, was denied admission to the University of Texas Law School in February 1946. Sweatt had met all the requirements, except that Texas schools were segregated by law. The Supreme Court of the United States ruled in June, 1950, Sweatt must be allowed admission.

== United States Senate ==
In 1952, Daniel was elected to the United States Senate. He was immediately taken under the wing of Senate Minority Leader Lyndon B. Johnson, with the senior senator helping to alleviate office space shortage by allowing Daniel's staff to work out of LBJ's office.

Daniel held positions on committees of the Interior; Interstate and Foreign Commerce; Post Office and Civil Service; and Judiciary, as well as Judiciary subcommittees on Internal Security and Juvenile Delinquency.

The new senator worked on a narcotics probe and reforming the electoral college.

Opposed to desegregation efforts, Senator Price Daniel joined 19 other senators and 77 members of the United States House of Representatives in signing the 1956 Southern Manifesto, which condemned the 1954 United States Supreme Court decision in Brown v. Board of Education, and encouraged states to resist implementing it. The Supreme Court's 1958 Cooper v. Aaron decision held that the states were bound to uphold the previous decision on desegregation.

=== Tidelands and 1952 elections ===
The most long-lasting accomplishment of Price Daniel was in helping to retain Texas title to the submerged lands, and mineral rights therein, off the coast. The victory has netted billions of dollars for Texas schools. Texas viewed this issue as of primary importance during the 1952 campaign. Eisenhower supported state ownership, while Adlai Stevenson stood in opposition. The state of Texas, including many prominent state Democratic party leaders, went with Eisenhower who won the state of Texas in the election.

The Tidelands controversy was over who owned the rights to 2,440,650 acres (9,877.0 km^{2}) of submerged land in the Gulf of Mexico between low tide and the state's Gulfward boundary three leagues (10.35 miles) from shore. Texas acquired the rights as a republic, and later reserved the rights when it entered the Union in 1845. The Texas legislature authorized the School Land Board to execute the mineral leases on behalf of the Permanent School Fund.

Among coastal states, the Federal government claimed ownership when oil was discovered on the lands. The first lawsuit, United States v. California, 332 U.S. 19, was filed by the Federal government against California in 1946. The attorneys general of all other states filed an amicus curiae brief in opposition. Price Daniel Sr., as Texas State Attorney General, argued the case before the Supreme Court of the United States on March 13–14, 1947, on behalf of all the other states. In 1947, the Supreme Court decided against California on June 23, 1947.

Congress presented a 1952 bill confirming states' ownership, which was vetoed by President Harry Truman. In that same year, Presidential candidate General Dwight D. Eisenhower stated his belief that the Annexation Agreement of Texas gave the rights to Texas. Candidate Adlai Stevenson announced he would veto any bill out of Congress guaranteeing the rights to Texas. The Texas state Democratic convention passed a resolution urging all its members to vote for Eisenhower.

In 1953, then Senator Price Daniel was one of 35 co-sponsors to the Florida Senator Spessard Holland-authored Senate Joint Resolution 13 restoring the right of the submerged lands to the coastal states. Daniel, together with Lyndon Johnson, Spessard Holland and Senate Majority Leader Robert A. Taft worked tirelessly to overcome the 27-day filibuster of the bill, with it passing the Senate 56-35 votes, and approved by the House of Representatives on May 13. President Eisenhower signed the bill into law on May 22, 1953.

== Governor ==
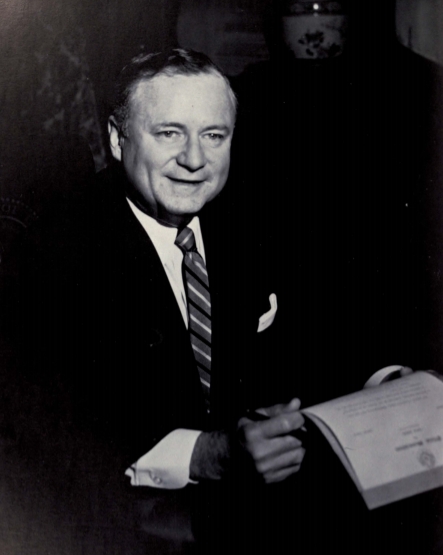
Daniel as governor.

Senator Daniel was elected governor in 1956. Thereafter, Daniel's chief Democratic rival Ralph Yarborough went on to succeed Daniel after a temporary appointee, William A. Blakley of Dallas, in the Senate in a special election held in 1957.

As governor, Daniel saw legislative fruition of his proposals to reorganize of the State Board of Insurance, passage of an ethics code for lawmakers and other state employees, regulation of lobbyists, an improved structure for state archives, and a long-range water conservation plan.

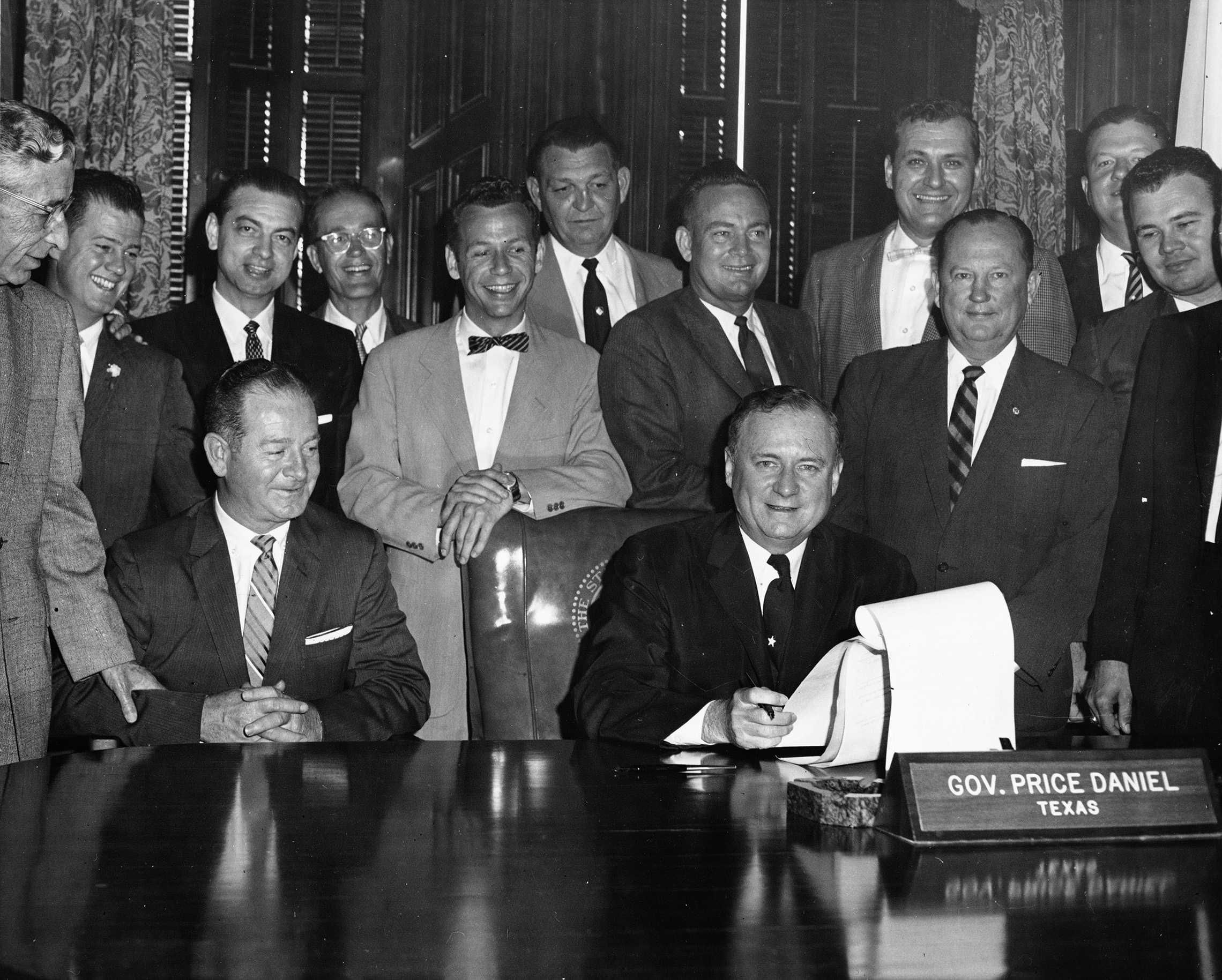
Price Daniel signing the bill making Arlington State College a four-year college in 1959

Daniel was re-elected governor in 1958 by a 7–1 margin over the Republican Edwin S. Mayer (1896–1963), a San Angelo sheep and goats owner who was twice a delegate for Dwight D. Eisenhower at the 1952 and 1956 Republican National Conventions. In 1960, Mayer was the only delegate at the national convention who abstained on the nomination of former U.S. Senator Henry Cabot Lodge Jr., of Massachusetts as Richard Nixon's running mate.

In 1960, Daniel won renomination over Jack Cox, an oil equipment executive from Houston. Daniel received 1,637,755 votes (72.8 percent) to 612,963 votes (27.2 percent) for Republican William M. Steger of Tyler.

In 1961, the legislature passed a 2-cent sales tax, which Daniel allowed to become law without his signature so the state would remain solvent. After the passage of the sales tax, Daniel's popularity waned, and he failed at his attempt to be elected to a fourth term in 1962. He lost the Democratic nomination to former Navy Secretary John B. Connally Jr.

== Public service in later years ==
President Johnson later appointed Daniel to head the Office of Emergency Preparedness. In 1971, Governor Preston Smith named Daniel to the 9-member Texas Supreme Court, filling a vacancy left by the retirement of Clyde E. Smith. He was re-elected twice in 1972 and 1978, and retired at the end of his second term.

After retiring from the Texas Supreme Court, he served as pro-bono legal council for the Alabama-Coushatta Indians. As their counsel, he was instrumental in the 1965 creation of the Texas Commission for Indian Affairs (TCIA), 59th Legislature, House Bill 1096. On April 5, 1967, the Texas Legislature passed House Concurrent Resolution No. 83 recognizing Daniel for his contributions to the tribe and to the creation of the TCIA.

== Personal life ==
Marion Price Daniel Sr. is also known as Marion Price Daniel Jr. and as Marion Price Daniel II, because his father, Marion Price Daniel Sr. (1882–1937) was the first generation with the name. Daniel II married the former Jean Houston Baldwin on June 28, 1940. Their son, publicly known as Price Daniel Jr., is properly Marion Price Daniel III. The couple also had three other children: Jean Houston Murph, Houston Lee, and John Baldwin.

Daniel died of a stroke on August 25, 1988. He was interred at Daniel Family Cemetery in Liberty, Texas.

== Legacy ==
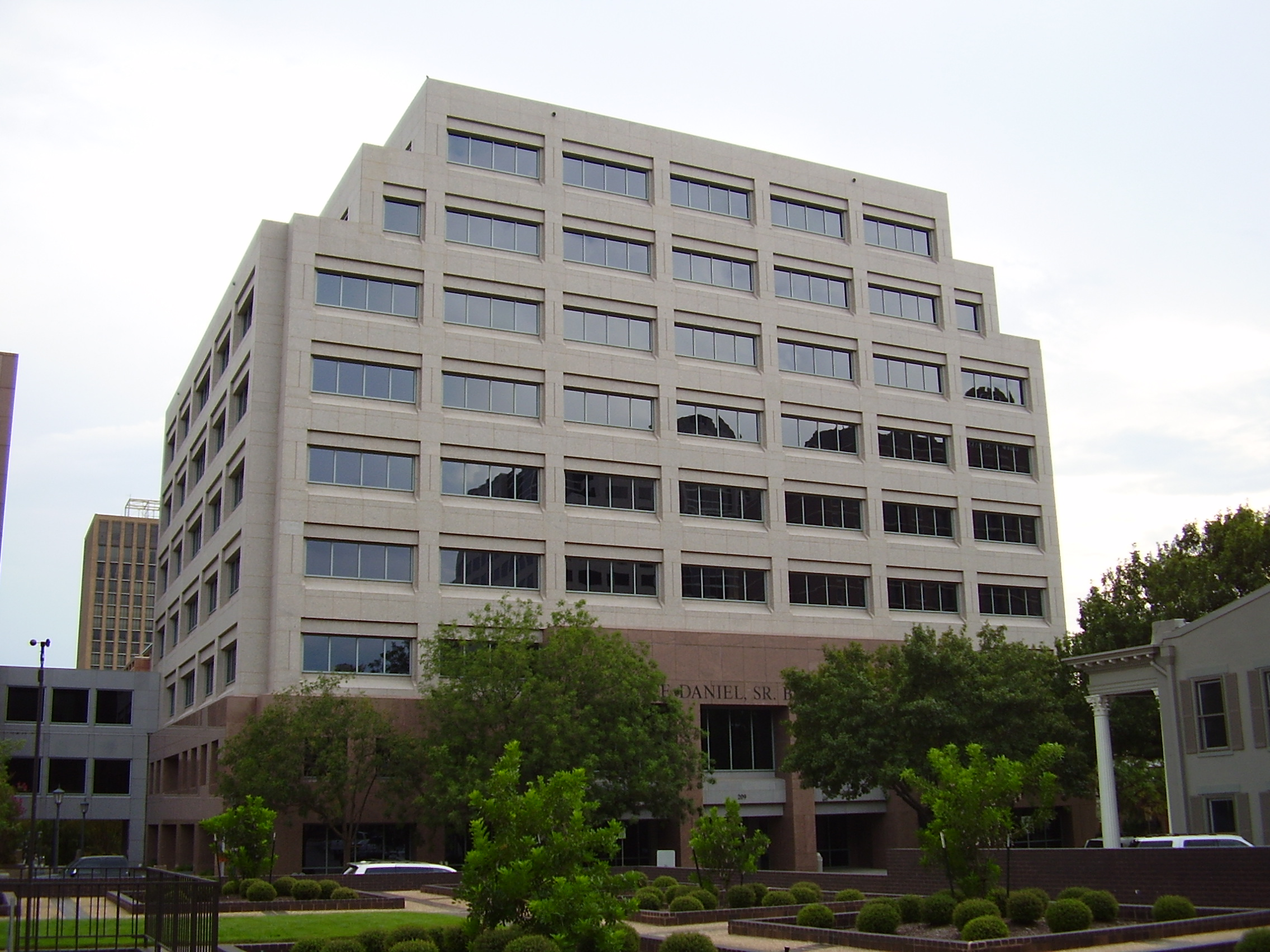
Price Daniel Sr. State Office Building

- Price Daniel Sr. State Office Building, Austin, is part of the Texas State Capitol Complex
- Price Daniel Distinguished Public Service Award, Baylor Alumni Association

== Jean and Price Daniel Home and Archives ==
The Jean and Price Daniel Home and Archives came under full ownership of the State of Texas in October 1998. Governor and Mrs. Daniel began construction on the Greek Revival style 7,318-square-foot (679.9 m^{2}) Liberty, Texas house in 1982, with an official opening in 1984. It was patterned after the governor's mansion in Austin designed by architect Abner Cook. The Daniels donated the home and 10 acres (40,000 m^{2}) of land, reserving a lifetime interest, to the Texas State Library Archives. The home is the repository of the library, archives, furniture, and mementos that document the Daniels' lives and years of public service.

It is maintained and funded by the Atascosito Historical Society and located on the grounds of the Sam Houston Regional Library and Research Center, a part of the Archives and Information Services Division of the Texas State Library and Archives Commission. Located 3 miles (4.8 km) north of Liberty on FM 1011, the center is open Monday through Friday, 8 AM to 5 pm and Saturday 9 AM to 4 pm. Admission is free. Tours are available by appointment; group tours must be arranged two weeks in advance.

== Organization memberships ==
Price Daniel was a member of the following organizations:

- American Legion
- Benevolent and Protective Order of Elks
- Freemasons
- Pi Kappa Delta
- Rotary International
- Shriners
- Sigma Delta Chi
- Woodmen of the World
- Veterans of Foreign Wars

Political offices
Preceded by Homer Leonard	Speaker of the Texas House of Representatives; 1943–1945	Succeeded by Claud Gilmer
Preceded by Allan Shivers	Governor of Texas; 1957–1963	Succeeded by John Connally
Preceded by C. Farris Bryant	Director of the Office of Emergency Preparedness; 1967–1969	Succeeded by George Lincoln
Legal offices
Preceded by Grover Sellers	Attorney General of Texas; 1947–1953	Succeeded by John Ben Shepperd
Preceded by Clyde Smith	Associate Justice of the Texas Supreme Court; Seat 7; 1971–1978	Succeeded by Franklin Spears
Party political offices
Preceded by Grover Sellers	Democratic nominee for Texas Attorney General; 1946, 1948, 1950	Succeeded by John Ben Shepperd
Preceded by Tom Connally	Democratic nominee for U.S. Senator from Texas (Class 1); 1952	Succeeded by Ralph Yarborough
Preceded by Murray Sells	Republican nominee for U.S. Senator from Texas (Class 1); 1952	Succeeded by Thad Hutcheson
Preceded by Allan Shivers	Democratic nominee for Governor of Texas; 1956, 1958, 1960	Succeeded by John Connally
U.S. Senate
Preceded by Tom Connally	U.S. Senator (Class 1) from Texas; 1953–1957; Served alongside: Lyndon B. Johnson	Succeeded by William A. Blakley
