= 1952 United States Senate election in Texas =

1952 United States Senate Democratic primary in Texas
- July 26, 1952
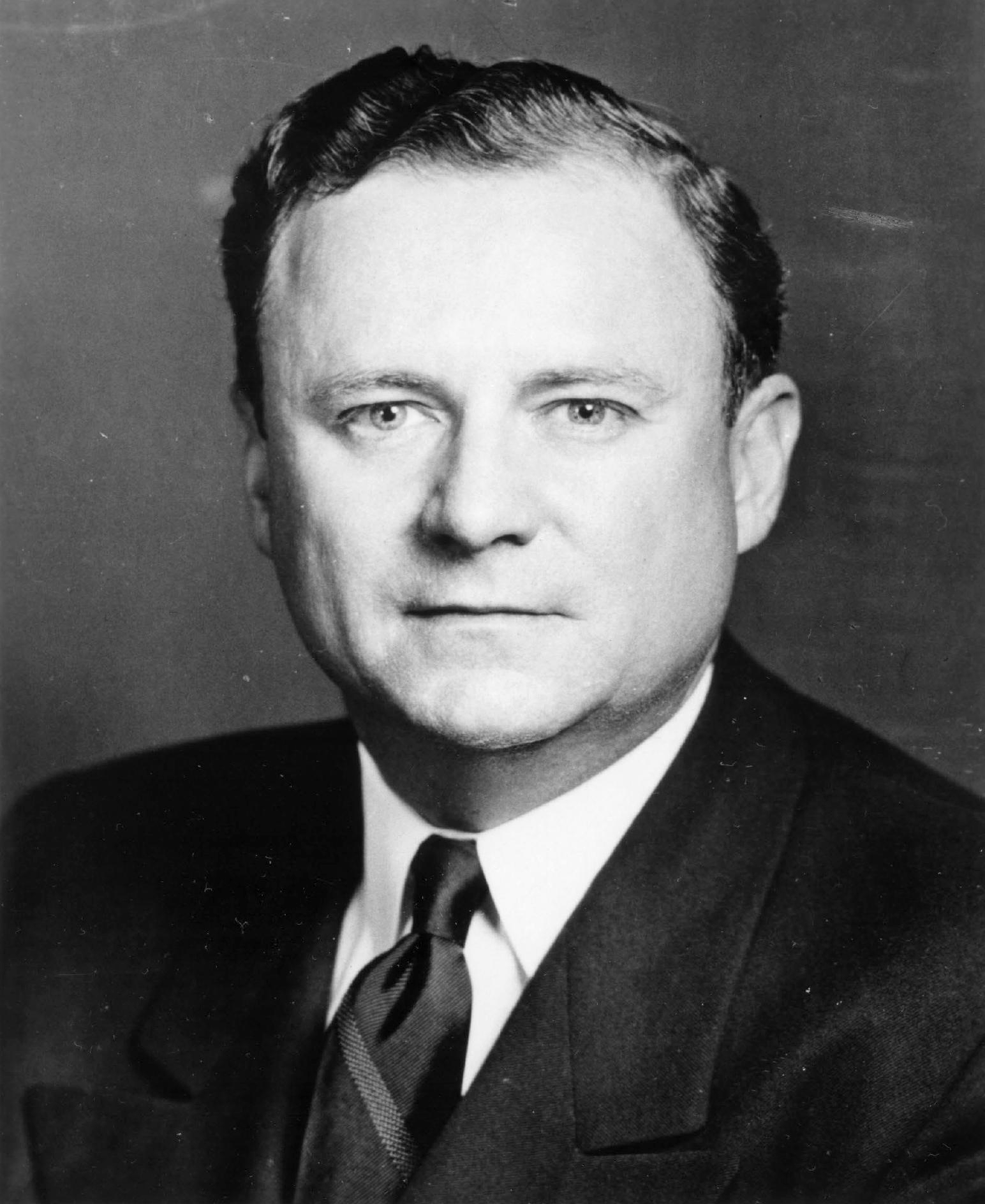

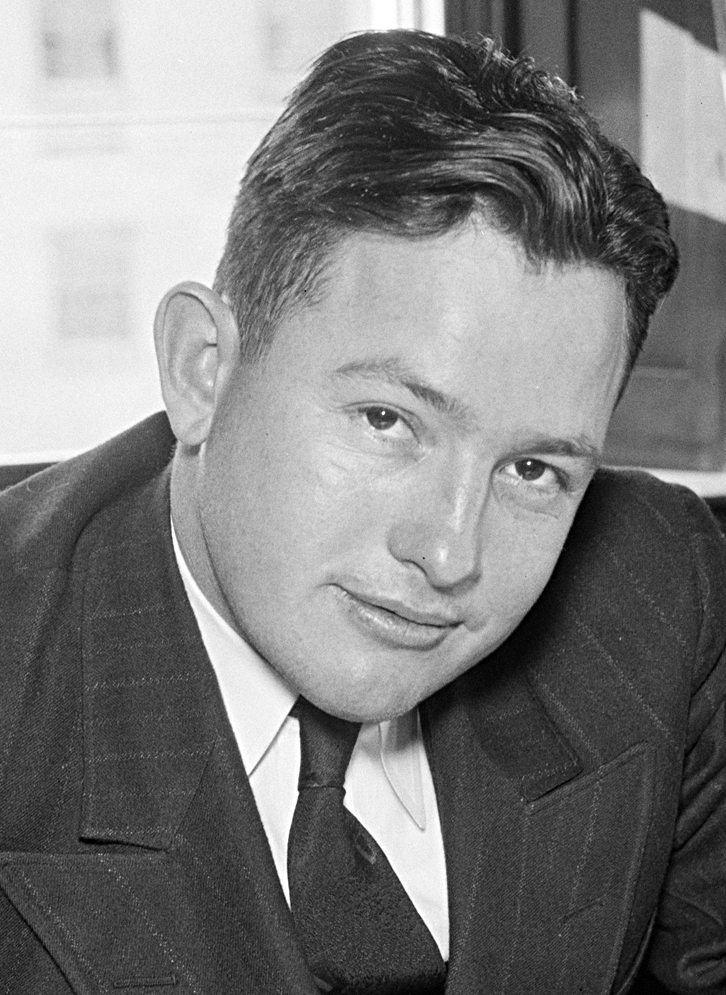

Nominee	Price Daniel	Lindley Beckworth	E.W. Napier
Party	Democratic	Democratic	Democratic
Popular vote	940,770	285,842	70,132
Percentage	72.55%	22.04%	5.41%
- County results Daniel: 50–60% 60–70% 70–80% 80–90% >90% Beckworth: 50–60% 60–70% 70–80%
U.S. senator before election
Tom Connally
Democratic
Elected U.S. Senator
Price Daniel
Democratic

The 1952 United States Senate election in Texas was held on November 4, 1952. Incumbent Democratic U.S. Senator Tom Connally did not run for re-election to a fifth term.

Attorney General Price Daniel won the open race to succeed him, defeating U.S. Representative Lindley Beckworth in the Democratic primary on July 26. Daniel was unopposed in the general election, as the Texas Republican Party chose to endorse the Democratic ticket for all but one statewide offices to maximize votes for their presidential nominee Dwight Eisenhower.

== Democratic primary ==
=== Candidates ===
- Lindley Beckworth, U.S. Representative from Tyler
- Price Daniel, Attorney General of Texas
- E.W. Napier

=== Results ===
1952 Democratic U.S. Senate primary
Party	Candidate	Votes	%
Democratic	Price Daniel	940,770	72.55%
Democratic	Lindley Beckworth	285,842	22.04%
Democratic	E. W. Napier	70,132	5.41%
Total votes		1,296,744	100.00%

== General election ==
=== Results ===
1952 United States Senate election in Texas
Party	Candidate	Votes	%	±%
Democratic	Price Daniel	1,425,007	75.19%	▼13.32
Republican	Price Daniel	469,594	24.78%	▲13.29
Independent	Price Daniel	591	0.03%	N/A
Total	Price Daniel	1,895,192	100.00%	N/A
Total votes		1,895,192	100.00%	
Democratic hold				

County results by ticket Daniel: 50–60% 60–70% 70–80% 80–90% 90–100% Daniel: 50–60% 60–70%

== See also ==
- 1952 United States Senate elections
