= Miranda Teboh-Ewungkem =

Cameroonian-American mathematician (born 1974)

Miranda Ijang Teboh-Ewungkem
- Born: 1974 (age 51–52); Cameroon
- Education: University of Buea; Lehigh University
- Occupation: Mathematical biologist
- Known for: Mosquito-borne disease research

Miranda Ijang Teboh-Ewungkem (born 1974) is a Cameroonian-American applied mathematician, mathematical biologist and university professor. Her research focuses on ordinary and partial differential equations and statistical methods for modeling the dynamics and transmission of infectious diseases.

== Life and work ==
Teboh-Ewungkem was born into a family of seven children and grew up in Cameroon, Central Africa. Because her parents encouraged her to study medicine she enrolled in a biology class as an undergraduate, but after one month, she got tired of her studies and switched to her best subject, math. It was during her first year at the university that Teboh-Ewungkem came down with the "worst case of malaria" she ever contracted. Later, she said, "The goal at the time was to survive, ... but ultimately the experience would inspire a master’s thesis." Since then her life's work has been to use mathematics to "examine a mosquito’s transmission of the disease-carrying parasite from one person to another."

At the University of Buea in Cameroon, Teboh-Ewungkem earned a Bachelor of Science in 1996 in mathematics with a minor in computer science and a Master of Science in mathematics in 1998. From 1998 to 2002 she conducted research at Lehigh University in Bethlehem, Pennsylvania, and there she received a Master of Science in statistics in January 2003. Shortly thereafter, in May 2003, she received her doctorate under the supervision of Eric Paul Salathe with a dissertation entitled: Mathematical Analysis of Oxygen and Substrate Transport Within a Multicapillary System in Skeletal Muscle. She then worked as Hsiung Visiting Assistant Professor at Lehigh University until 2004. She joined the faculty at Lafayette College in 2004 and taught as a Visiting Assistant Professor until 2006 when she was appointed Assistant Professor.

She has served as an associate editor of the International Journal of Applied Mathematics & Statistics (IJAMAS) since 2006. She has given keynote lectures as an invited speaker at many conferences, including as the keynote lecture at the 2010 Southern Africa Mathematical Sciences Association (SAMSA) conference in Gaborone, Botswana, which was attended by government officials and the head of the University of Botswana. In 2009, with a grant from the U.S. National Science Foundation, she organized an international workshop and conference at the University of Buea for colleges and universities in Africa, the United States, and Europe to exchange ideas on the use of applied mathematics for health problems including AIDS and malaria.

She has said that "in African countries, more than a million people die of malaria each year and 20 percent of them are children." In addition to malaria, Teboh-Ewungkem's research contributes to investigations into other mosquito-borne diseases such as Dengue fever, Zika fever, Chikungunya and lymphatic filariasis.

== Memberships ==
- Association for Women in Mathematics
- American Mathematical Society
- Society for Mathematical Biology
- Society of Industrial and Applied Mathematicians
- Mathematical Association of America
- Honor Society for International students
- Scholars-Beta Pi Chapter of Phi Beta Delta
- Black Women in Mathematics

== Selected honors ==
- 2003: Best Professor, Summer Excel Program, Lehigh University
- 2020: Fellow of the African Scientific Institute
