= Jaafar Aksikas =

Moroccan-American academic

Jaafar Aksikas is a Moroccan-American academic, activist, media personality and cultural critic. He is currently Professor of Media Studies and Communication at Columbia College Chicago, United States, where he teaches at the intersection of politics, media and civic media and activism. He is also President and CEO of the Institute for Global Media, Democracy and Culture. He was also President of the Cultural Studies Association (2014-2016). Jaafar Aksikas was educated both in Morocco and the USA and holds a Ph.D in Cultural Studies: Media Studies from George Mason University, USA and an MA in the Humanities from Al Akhawayn University, Morocco. His teaching, research and activism are at the intersection of media, politics, law and culture.

He is the Editor of the Cultural Studies and Marxism book series for the international publisher Rowman & Littlefield International (2015–present). His work has appeared in several scholarly journals, including Cultural Studies, Reviews in Cultural Theory, Lateral, Mediterranean Politics, and Cultuur en Migratie. Aksikas has taught and published widely in the fields of Cultural Studies, media/culture industry studies, critical legal studies, American Studies, and Middle Eastern Studies. He also serves on the editorial boards of Cultural Studies and Lateral journals. He has received numerous awards, including the George Mason University VISION Award (2003) and the Marquis Who is Who in America award (2010). He also holds membership at the Phi Beta Delta Honor Society for International Scholars.

He is also the Founding General Editor of Cultural Landscapes, the Founding Coordinator of the Cultural Studies Colloquium Series at Columbia College Chicago, and he serves as a member of the Illinois Network on Islam and Muslim Societies. He also serves as consultant for lawyers and the media on Middle Eastern and North African societies, cultures and politics.

== Publications ==
His books and edited volumes include:

- Aksikas, Jaafar (2019). Cultural Studies in the Classroom and Beyond: Critical Pedagogies and Classroom Strategies. London: Palgrave Macmillan. ISBN 978-3-030-25393-6.
- Aksikas, Jaafar (2016). Culture, Law, and Legitimacy in the Era of Neoliberal Capitalism. London: Routledge. ISBN 978-1-138-64284-3.
- Aksikas, Jaafar (2016). Cultural Studies and the 'Juridical Turn': Culture, Law, and Legitimacy in the Era of Neoliberal Capitalism. London: Routledge. ISBN 978-1-138-64284-3.
- Aksikas, Jaafar (2014). Cultural Studies and/of the Law. Abingdon: Routledge. ISBN 978-1-138-80416-6.
- Aksikas, Jaafar (2009). Arab Modernities: Islamism, Nationalism, and Liberalism in the Post-Colonial Arab World. New York: Peter Lang. ISBN 978-1-4331-0534-0.
- Aksikas, Jaafar (2002). The Sirah of Antar: an Islamic Interpretation of Some Aspects of Arab and Islamic History. Ifrane: Al Akhawayn University Press. ISBN 978-9954-413-00-5.

His other publications include:

- Culture Industries: Critical Interventions (2011), an inaugural special journal issue on the culture and media industries for the journal Lateral.
- Critical Purchase in Neoliberal Times, a special journal issue on engaged and community-based forms of cultural studies scholarship for the journal Lateral.
