= Pi Kappa Delta =

American public speaking honor society

- ΠΚΔ
- Founded: January 1, 1913; 113 years ago Ottawa University
- Type: Honor
- Affiliation: Independent
- Status: Active
- Emphasis: Debate and public speaking
- Scope: International
- Motto: "The Art of Persuasion, Beautiful and Just"
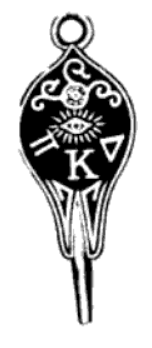
- Member badge
- Colors: Cardinal red and White
- Flower: Yellow daffodil
- Publication: The Key; The Forensic
- Chapters: 200+ active, 384+ chartered
- Members: 80,000+ lifetime
- Headquarters: 1670 South Robert Street, #370; St. Paul, Minnesota 55118; United States
- Website: pkd.clubexpress.com

Pi Kappa Delta (ΠΚΔ) is an American honor society and organization for intercollegiate debaters, public speakers, and instructors teaching speech, debate, and oral communication. Established in 1913, the organization is the oldest debating society in the country. PKD influenced the formation of the National Forensic League, the emergence of national forensic tournaments, and the development of new formats for debate. More than 60,000 individuals have been initiated into PKD. Active chapters are located on more than 200 college and university campuses.

== History ==
Pi Kappa Delta was established in 1913 at Ottawa University as an honor society and organization for intercollegiate debaters, public speakers, and instructors teaching speech, debate, and oral communication. It is the oldest debating society in the United States. PKD influenced the formation of the National Forensic League, the emergence of national forensic tournaments, and the development of new formats for debate.

The society encourages the education of articulate citizens through a three-part focus: the commitment to and promotion of ethical, humane and inclusive communication and educational practices; the commitment to and promotion of professional development of forensics educators; and the commitment to and promotion of comprehensive forensics programming.

In 1929, Pi Kappa Delta had initiated 9,383 members and had chartered 130 chapters. By 1949, it had initiated 22,089 and had 181 active chapters and seventeen inactive chapters.

More than 60,000 individuals have been initiated into PKD.

== Symbols ==
Pi Kappa Delta's badge is a pear-shaped key with a trifoliate scroll, an eye, and the Greek letters "ΠΚΔ". The key includes jewels indicating the member's order and degree.

Pi Kappa Delta's motto is "The Art of Persuasion, Beautiful and Just". Its colors are Cardinal red and white. However, when used for academic cords or stoles, Cardinal red and slate grey are substituted. Its flower is the yellow daffodil.

== Activities ==
=== National convention ===
PKD sponsors a national convention every other year, at which time the business of the organization is conducted, along with an annual national tournament in individual events and debate. Competition is open to all undergraduate students who are members of PKD. Competitors who place highly enough in competition at this tournament earn points toward qualifying for the American Forensic Association National Speech Tournament and competing for a national championship. This tournament can justifiably be considered a "team" tournament because both individual events and debate points add up to create the final sweepstakes total for a school. Quite often, PKD sponsors experimental events at the National Tournament.

=== Journal ===
PKD publishes a refereed journal entitled The Forensic of Pi Kappa Delta. This journal is the oldest national forensic journal and has been a leader in pedagogical forensic research throughout its history. A cross-section of articles would include topics ranging from debate to individual events to philosophical issues related to competition and forensic education. The Forensic accepts submissions from all members of the forensic community.

=== National Communication Association Convention ===
PKD sponsors programs at the annual National Communication Association convention. In addition, a variety of awards are presented on an annual basis. These include the Pi Kappa Delta Hall of Fame, the L.E. Norton Award for Outstanding Scholarship, the John Shields Award for Outstanding Contributions to Pi Kappa Delta, the E.R. Nichols Award for Outstanding Contributions to Furtherance of the Forensic Discipline, the R. David Ray Award for Outstanding New PKD Chapter, the Carolyn Keefe Award for Outstanding Alumni, and the Bob Derryberry Award for Outstanding New Forensic Educator.

== Chapters ==
Pi Kappa Delta has chartered more than 380 chapters, with more than 200 being active.

== Notable members ==
- Jerry Bradley, poet and university professor
- Hilary A. Bush, Lieutenant Governor of Missouri
- Russell L. Caldwell, historian
- Price Daniel, Governor of Texas and justice of the Supreme Court of Texas
- David Felmley, president of Illinois State Normal University
- John S. Goff, historian and college professor
- Junius Ralph Magee, bishop of the Methodist Episcopal Church and The Methodist Church,
- Charles C. McCracken, president of the University of Connecticut
- Carl W. McIntosh, president of Montana State University, Idaho State College, and California State University, Long Beach
- Bill Milldyke, broadcast journalist, foreign correspondent, and television executive with ABC News
- John O. Moseley, president of Central State College and the University of Nevada, Reno
- Roger E. Nebergall, speech professor at the University of Oklahoma and the University of Illinois at Urbana–Champaign
- Stanley M. Powell, Michigan House of Representatives
- Rosemarie Skaine, sociologist and author
- Robert E. Smylie, Governor of Idaho and Attorney General of Idaho
- Richard J. Steffens, Wisconsin State Assembly
- Lem Tucker, television news journalist

== See also ==
- Competitive debate in the United States
- Extemporaneous speaking
