= 1960 Texas gubernatorial election =

- November 8, 1960
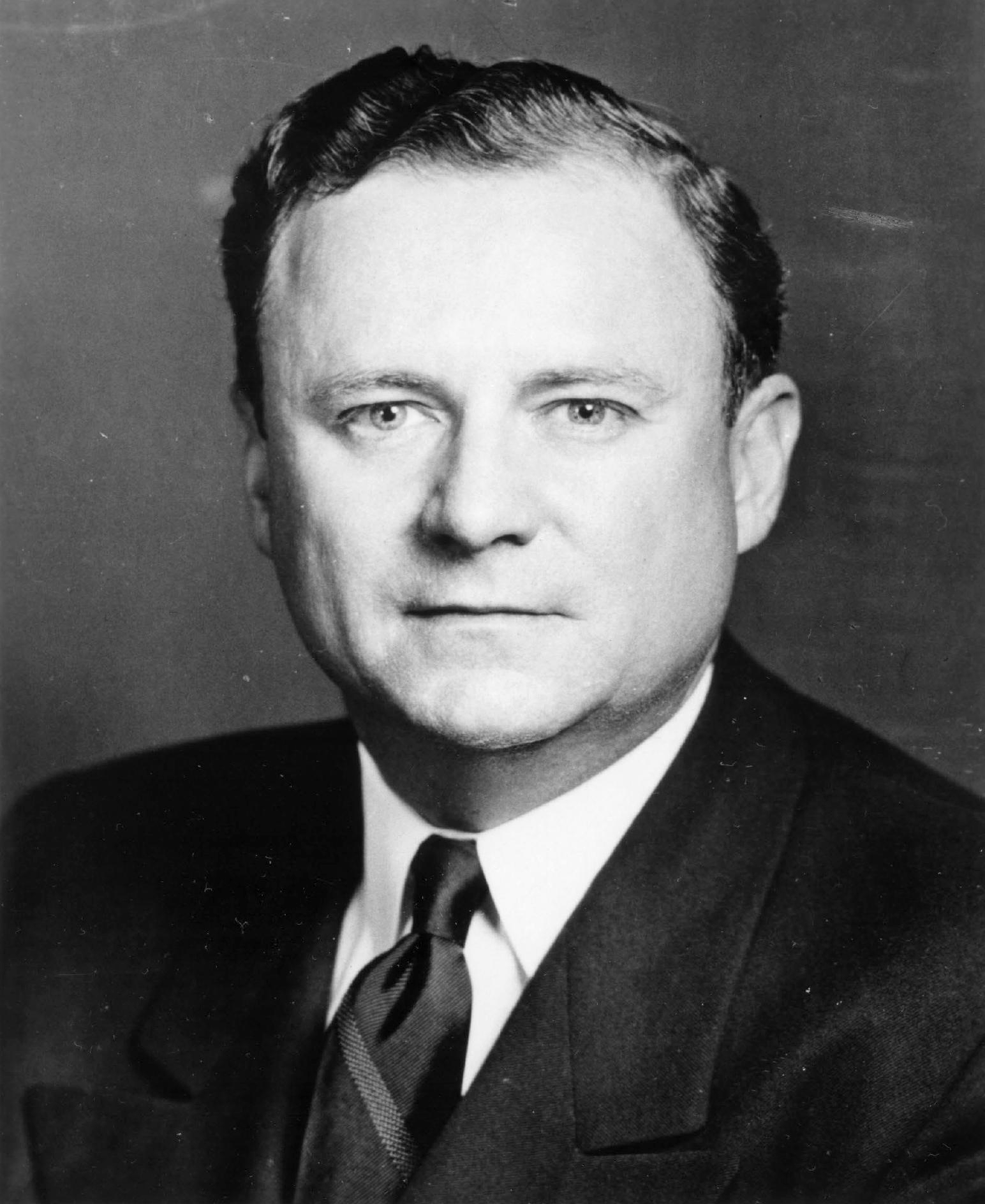

Nominee	Price Daniel	William Steger
Party	Democratic	Republican
Popular vote	1,627,698	609,808
Percentage	72.75%	27.25%
- County results Daniel: 50–60% 60–70% 70–80% 80–90% >90% Steger: 50–60% 70–80%
Governor before election
Price Daniel
Democratic
Elected Governor
Price Daniel
Democratic

The 1960 Texas gubernatorial election was held on November 8, 1960, to elect the governor of Texas. Incumbent Democratic governor Price Daniel was easily reelected to a third term, winning 73% of the vote to Republican William Steger's 27%.

== Primaries ==
=== Democratic ===
Democratic primary results
Party	Candidate	Votes	%
Democratic	Price Daniel (Inc.)	908,992	59.46%
Democratic	Jack Cox	619,834	40.54%
Total votes		1,528,834	100.00%

== General election ==
- Price Daniel, incumbent governor
- William Steger, former United States Attorney for the Eastern District of Texas

=== Results ===
General election results
Party	Candidate	Votes	%
Democratic	Price Daniel (incumbent)	1,627,698	72.75%
Republican	William Steger	609,808	27.25%
Total votes		2,237,506	100.00%
Democratic hold			
