= Richard J. Steffens =

American politician (1921–2008)

Richard J. Steffens (August 23, 1921 – January 2, 2008) was a member of the Wisconsin State Assembly.

== Biography ==
Steffens was born on August 23, 1921, in Neenah, Wisconsin. In 1939, he was valedictorian of his high school class in Menasha, Wisconsin. He then attended the University of Wisconsin-Oshkosh and the University of Wisconsin-Madison and joined Pi Kappa Delta.

During World War II, Steffens served with the European Theater of Operations United States Army. He also took part in espionage with the Secret Intelligence Service and the French Armed Forces. Awards he received for his service include the Bronze Star Medal and the Croix de guerre of France.

Steffens died on January 2, 2008. He was buried at Arlington National Cemetery.

== Political career ==
Steffens was a member of the Assembly from 1947 to 1949. Additionally, he was City Attorney of Menasha. He was a Republican.
