= Phi Beta Delta (honor society) =

International education honor society

- ΦΒΔ
- Founded: February 27, 1986; 40 years ago California State University, Long Beach
- Type: Honor
- Affiliation: ACHS
- Status: Active
- Emphasis: International education
- Scope: International
- Motto: Scientia Mutua Mundi "World's Shared Knowledge"
- Colors: Red and Golden Yellow
- Symbol: Torch and open book
- Publication: The Medallion; International Research and Review
- Chapters: 206
- Members: 10,000+ lifetime
- Headquarters: Administration Building; Rooms 148 & 150; CSU San Bernardino; 5500 University Parkway; San Bernardino, California 92407; United States
- Website: www.phibetadelta.org/index.php

The Phi Beta Delta Honor Society for International Scholars (ΦΒΔ) is an international honor society that was founded at California State University, Long Beach on February 27, 1986. It was the first honor society dedicated to recognizing scholarly achievement through international involvement and education, to give scholarships to deserving students and to enhance knowledge about various cultures around the world. It was established as a national organization in 1987 with 38 chartered chapters and has grown to an international organization with over 179 chapters.

== History ==
Phi Beta Delta Society was founded at California State University, Long Beach on February 27, 1986. It was the first honor society to recognize scholarly achievement through international involvement and education. The society seeks to enhance knowledge about various cultures worldwide. It also awards scholarships to deserving students.

Phi Belta Delta was established as a national organization in 1987 with 38 chartered chapters.

Its publications include:

- The Medallion (newsletter)
- Proceedings (a record of ideas, issues, and topics of interest to the Society)
- International Research and Review (the peer reviewed journal of the Society)
- 52 Weekly Thoughts

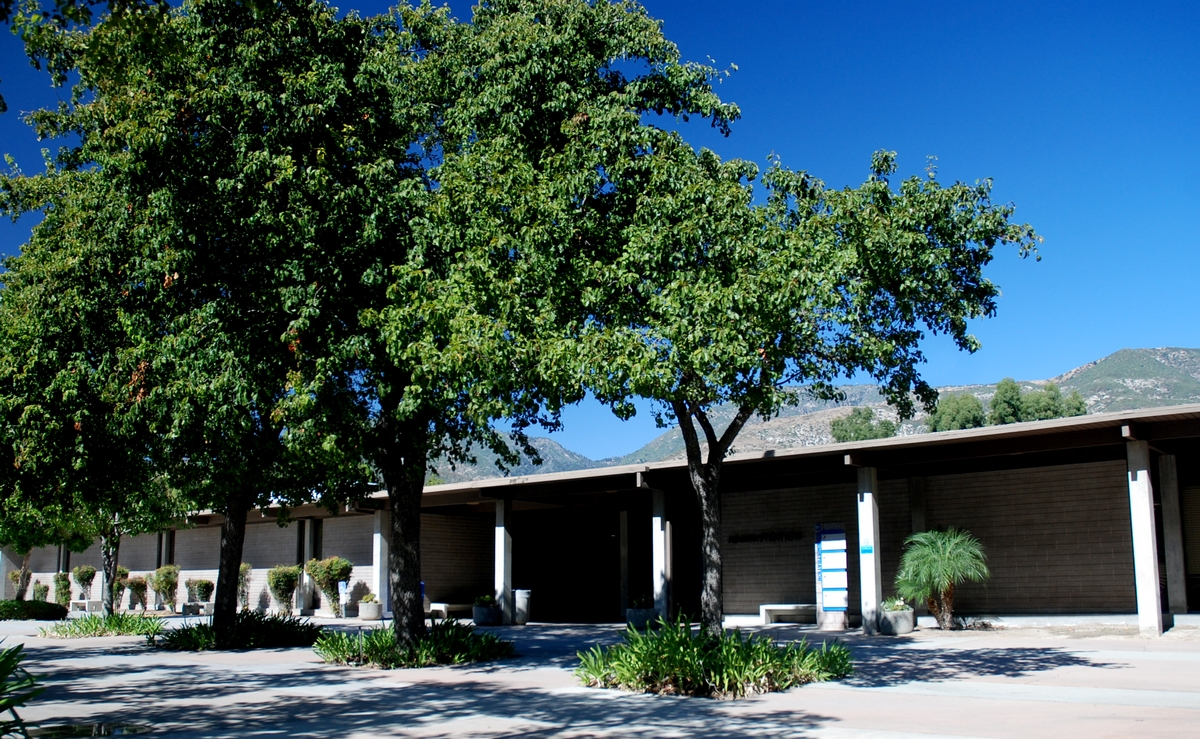
Since July 2011, Phi Beta Delta's headquarters have been located at California State University, San Bernardino.

Phi Beta Delta's headquarters are at California State University, San Bernardino. Its prior headquarters was in Washington, D.C.

== Symbols ==
The Greek letters Phi Beta Delta are acronyms for the Greek words Philomatheia, Biotremmonia, Diapheren which translates to "Love of knowledge, valuing of human life; and achieving excellence". The society's motto is Scientia Mutua Mundi or the "World's Shared Knowledge".

Phi Beta Delta's symbols include the torch and an open book. Its colors are red and golden yellow. Red represents "fire, the feelings of the heart, the blood that flows through all humankind". The color gold symbolizing the sun, value, and worth.

The society's seal consists of a representation of the world, formed by latitude and longitude lines and encircled by a halo of leaves. The Greek letters ΦΒΔ are superimposd diagonally over the world.

The Phi Beta Delta shield is shaped like those from the Greco-Roman world and includes the society's insignia. The shield represents academic freedom. At the center of the shield is the society's seal. Above the seal is a torch, representing the illumination provided by education. At the base of the seal is an open book, symbolizing the sharing of knowledge. The society's mottos is at the base of the shield. The shield does not include "supporters", the traditional animals.

The society's medallion features its shield. The Phi Beta Delta flag and banner are red and the features its shield in gold; chapters can add their name to either.

== Membership ==
Membership in the Society is open to individuals who have demonstrated scholarly achievement through international involvement. These individuals include:

- International students (non-immigrant visa holders in the upper division or graduate levels) who have demonstrated high scholastic achievement at their institution;
- Domestic students (upper division and graduate level) who have demonstrated high scholastic achievement in the pursuit of academic studies abroad in exchange programs approved by the institution or in participation in comparable international programs or experiences where academic relevance can be demonstrated to the institution;
- Faculty and staff who have been involved in recognized international endeavors (i.e. research, teaching, program development, or service).

== Chapters ==
Phi Beta Delta has chartered 206 chapters. Following is a list of chapters, with active chapters in bold and inactive chapters and institutions in italics.

Chapter	Charter date	Institution	Location	Status	Ref.
**Alpha**	February 27, 1986	California State University, Long Beach	Long Beach, California	Active	
**Beta**	1987	California State University, Fullerton	Fullerton, California	Active	
Gamma	1987	Marymount College, Tarrytown	Tarrytown, New York	Inactive	(Note: The college closed in 2007.)
**Delta**	1987	San Diego State University	San Diego, California	Active	
**Epsilon**	1987	University of Texas at Arlington	Arlington, Texas	Active	
**Zeta**	1987	California State University, Los Angeles	Los Angeles, California	Active	
**Eta**	1987	University of Nevada, Reno	Reno, Nevada	Active	
**Theta**	1987	Brigham Young University–Hawaii	Lāʻie, Hawaii	Active	
**Iota**	1987	North Carolina State University	Raleigh, North Carolina	Active	
**Kappa**	1987	University of North Texas	Denton, Texas	Active	
**Lambda**	1987	Pomona College	Claremont, California	Active	
**Mu**	1987	University of North Carolina at Charlotte	Charlotte, North Carolina	Active	
**Nu**	1987	University of Tennessee	Knoxville, Tennessee	Active	
**Xi**	1987	University of Virginia	Charlottesville, Virginia	Active	
**Omicron**	1987	California State University, Sacramento	Sacramento, California	Active	
**Pi**	1987	University of Florida	Gainesville, Florida	Active	
**Rho**	1987	University of California, San Diego	San Diego, California	Active	
**Sigma**	1987	Georgetown University	Washington, D.C.	Active	
**Tau**	1987	University of Georgia	Athens, Georgia	Active	
**Upsilon**	1987	California State University, Fresno	Fresno, California	Active	
**Phi**	1987	California State Polytechnic University, Pomona	Pomona, California	Active	
**Chi**	1987	Texas Tech University	Lubbock, Texas	Active	
**Psi**	1987	University of Minnesota	Minneapolis, Minnesota	Active	
**Omega**	1987	California State University, Northridge	Los Angeles, California	Active	
**Alpha Alpha**	1987	Michigan State University	East Lansing, Michigan	Active	
**Alpha Beta**	1987	University of Louisiana at Lafayette	Lafayette, Louisiana	Active	
**Alpha Gamma**	1987	California Polytechnic State University, San Luis Obispo	San Luis Obispo, California	Active	
**Alpha Delta**	1987	Iowa State University	Ames, Iowa	Active	
**Alpha Epsilon**	1987	Ohio State University	Columbus, Ohio	Active	
**Alpha Zeta**	1987	University of Hawaiʻi at Mānoa	Manoa, Honolulu, Hawaii	Active	
**Alpha Eta**	1987	Texas A&M University	College Station, Texas	Active	
**Alpha Theta**	1987	Boston University	Boston, Massachusetts	Active	
**Alpha Iota**	1987	University of Illinois at Urbana-Champaign	Urbana and Champaign, Illinois	Active	
**Alpha Kappa**	1987	University of California, Irvine	Irvine, California	Active	
**Alpha Lambda**	1987	Georgia State University	Atlanta, Georgia	Active	
**Alpha Mu**	1987	Chapman University	Orange, California	Active	
**Alpha Nu**	1987	Northeastern University	Boston, Massachusetts	Active	
**Alpha Xi**	1987	Evergreen State College	Olympia, Washington	Active	
**Alpha Omicron**	1987	University of Pennsylvania	Philadelphia, Pennsylvania	Active	
**Alpha Pi**		University of Kansas	Lawrence, Kansas	Active	
**Alpha Rho**		University of Denver	Denver, Colorado	Active	
**Alpha Sigma**		Syracuse University	Syracuse, New York	Active	
**Alpha Tau**		University of Iowa	Iowa City, Iowa	Active	
**Alpha Upsilon**		Auburn University	Auburn, Alabama	Active	
**Alpha Phi**		University of Nebraska–Lincoln	Lincoln, Nebraska	Active	
**Alpha Chi**		Creighton University	Omaha, Nebraska	Active	
**Alpha Psi**		West Texas A&M University	Canyon, Texas	Active	
**Alpha Omega**		Commonwealth University-Lock Haven	Lock Haven, Pennsylvania	Active	
**Beta Alpha**		Rider University	Lawrence Township, New Jersey	Active	
**Beta Beta**		Rollins College	Winter Park, Florida	Active	
**Beta Gamma**		University of Oklahoma, Oklahoma City Campus	Oklahoma City, Oklahoma	Active	
**Beta Delta**		University of Findlay	Findlay, Ohio	Active	
**Beta Epsilon**		Texas Christian University	Fort Worth, Texas	Active	
**Beta Zeta**		Kent State University	Kent, Ohio	Active	
**Beta Eta**		University of Arkansas	Fayetteville, Arkansas	Active	
**Beta Theta**		University of Miami	Coral Gables, Florida	Active	
**Beta Iota**		Ohio University	Athens, Ohio	Active	
**Beta Kappa**		University of Southern California	Los Angeles, California	Active	
**Beta Lambda**		University of New Orleans	New Orleans, Louisiana	Active	
**Beta Mu**		Capital University	Columbus, Ohio	Active	
**Beta Nu**		University of Alabama at Birmingham	Birmingham, Alabama	Active	
**Beta Xi**		Lamar University	Beaumont, Texas	Active	
**Beta Omicron**		George Washington University	Washington, D.C.	Active	
**Beta Pi**		Lehigh University	Bethlehem, Pennsylvania	Active	
**Beta Rho**		University of Toledo	Toledo, Ohio	Active	
**Beta Sigma**		Youngstown State University	Youngstown, Ohio	Active	
**Beta Tau**		University of Central Missouri	Warrensburg, Missouri	Active	
**Beta Upsilon**		University of Alabama	Tuscaloosa, Alabama	Active	
**Beta Phi**		Washburn University	Topeka, Kansas	Active	
**Beta Chi**		University of Maine	Orono, Maine	Active	
**Beta Psi**		State University of New York at Brockport	Brockport, New York	Active	
**Beta Omega**		Spelman College	Atlanta, Georgia	Active	
**Gamma Alpha**		University of New Mexico	Albuquerque, New Mexico	Active	
**Gamma Beta**		Oglethorpe University	Brookhaven, Georgia	Active	
**Gamma Gamma**		University of Hartford	West Hartford, Connecticut	Active	
**Gamma Delta**		Wright State University	Fairborn, Ohio	Active	
**Gamma Epsilon**		Mercer University	Macon, Georgia	Active	
**Gamma Zeta**		Southern Polytechnic State University	Marietta, Georgia	Active	
**Gamma Eta**		Central Michigan University	Mount Pleasant, Michigan	Active	
**Gamma Theta**		Bentley University	Waltham, Massachusetts	Active	
**Gamma Iota**		University of Richmond	Richmond, Virginia	Active	
**Gamma Kappa**		Purdue University	West Lafayette, Indiana	Active	
**Gamma Lambda**		California State University, San Bernardino	San Bernardino, California	Active	
**Gamma Mu**		William Woods University	Fulton, Missouri	Active	
**Gamma Nu**		Western Kentucky University	Bowling Green, Kentucky	Active	
**Gamma Xi**		Appalachian State University	Boone, North Carolina	Active	
**Gamma Omicron**		Rose–Hulman Institute of Technology	Terre Haute, Indiana	Active	
**Gamma Pi**		Davidson College	Davidson, North Carolina	Active	
**Gamma Rho**		East Carolina University	Greenville, North Carolina	Active	
**Gamma Sigma**		Universidad de las Américas Puebla	Cholula, Puebla, Mexico	Active	
**Gamma Tau**		Widener University	Chester, Pennsylvania	Active	
**Gamma Upsilon**		Ohio Northern University	Ada, Ohio	Active	
**Gamma Phi**		Alabama A&M University	Normal, Alabama	Active	
**Gamma Chi**		Old Dominion University	Norfolk, Virginia	Active	
**Gamma Psi**		San Francisco State University	San Francisco, California	Active	
**Gamma Omega**		Virginia Tech	Blacksburg, Virginia	Active	
**Delta Alpha**		Illinois State University	Normal, Illinois	Active	
**Delta Beta**		Iona University	New Rochelle, New York	Active	
**Delta Gamma**		Indiana University South Bend	South Bend, Indiana	Active	
**Delta Delta**		University of Missouri–Kansas City	Kansas City, Missouri	Active	
**Delta Epsilon**		University of Wisconsin–Whitewater	Whitewater, Wisconsin	Active	
**Delta Zeta**		Western Carolina University	Cullowhee, North Carolina	Active	
**Delta Eta**		University of South Alabama	Mobile, Alabama	Active	
**Delta Theta**		DePaul University	Chicago, Illinois	Active	
**Delta Iota**		University of Houston	Houston, Texas	Active	
**Delta Kappa**		University of Delaware	Newark, Delaware	Active	
**Delta Lambda**		Rowan University	Glassboro, New Jersey	Active	
**Delta Mu**		Niagara University	Lewiston, New York	Active	
**Delta Nu**		Columbus State University	Columbus, Georgia	Active	
**Delta Xi**		University of North Carolina Wilmington	Wilmington, North Carolina	Active	
**Delta Omicron**		Villanova University	Villanova, Pennsylvania	Active	
**Delta Pi**		Baker University	Baldwin City, Kansas	Active	
**Delta Rho**		Centro de Enseñanza Técnica y Superior	Mexicali, Baja California, Mexico	Active	
Delta Sigma		Mount Ida College	Newton, Massachusetts	Inactive	(Note: The college closed in 2018.)
**Delta Tau**		Keene State College	Keene, New Hampshire	Active	
**Delta Upsilon**		Southwestern College	Winfield, Kansas	Active	
**Delta Phi**		Ithaca College	Ithaca, New York	Active	
**Delta Chi**		Kutztown University of Pennsylvania	Kutztown, Pennsylvania	Active	
**Delta Psi**		Loyola University Chicago	Chicago, Illinois	Active	
**Delta Omega**		Cape Breton University	Sydney, Nova Scotia, Canada	Active	
**Epsilon Alpha**		American University in Bulgaria	Blagoevgrad, Bulgaria	Active	
**Epsilon Beta**		Wayne State University	Detroit, Michigan	Active	
**Epsilon Gamma**		International University in Geneva	Geneva, Switzerland	Active	
**Epsilon Delta**		George Mason University	Fairfax, Virginia	Active	
**Epsilon Epsilon**		Langston University	Langston, Oklahoma	Active	
**Epsilon Zeta**		Concordia University	Montreal, Quebec, Canada	Active	
**Epsilon Eta**		Dickinson College	Carlisle, Pennsylvania	Active	
**Epsilon Theta**		Quinnipiac University	Hamden, Connecticut	Active	
**Epsilon Iota**		Notre Dame of Maryland University	Baltimore, Maryland	Active	
**Epsilon Kappa**		Arcadia University	Glenside, Pennsylvania	Active	
**Epsilon Lambda**		Elon University	Elon, North Carolina	Active	
**Epsilon Mu**		Colorado School of Mines	Golden, Colorado	Active	
**Epsilon Nu**		John Carroll University	University Heights, Ohio	Active	
**Epsilon Xi**		St. Norbert College	De Pere, Wisconsin	Active	
**Epsilon Omicron**		Drexel University	Philadelphia, Pennsylvania	Active	
**Epsilon Pi**		University of Montana	Missoula, Montana	Active	
**Epsilon Rho**		Roger Williams University	Bristol, Rhode Island	Active	
**Epsilon Sigma**		University of Memphis	Memphis, Tennessee	Active	
**Epsilon Tau**		CIMBA	Asola, Lombardy, Italy	Active	
**Epsilon Upsilon**		Oklahoma State University	Stillwater, Oklahoma	Active	
**Epsilon Phi**		Dallas Baptist University	Dallas, Texas	Active	
**Epsilon Chi**	2005	Illinois Wesleyan University	Bloomington, Illinois	Active	
**Epsilon Psi**		Monterrey Institute of Technology and Higher Education	Monterrey, Mexico	Active	
**Epsilon Omega**	May 2004	University of Nebraska at Kearney	Kearney, Nebraska	Active	
**Zeta Alpha**		Florida International University, Downtown Miami Center	Miami, Florida	Active	
**Zeta Beta**		High Point University	High Point, North Carolina	Active	
**Zeta Gamma**		Northern Illinois University	DeKalb, Illinois	Active	
**Zeta Delta**		College of William & Mary	Williamsburg, Virginia	Active	
**Zeta Epsilon**		Universidad Popular Autónoma del Estado de Puebla	Puebla, Mexico	Active	
**Zeta Zeta**	April 2005	Ramapo College	Mahwah, New Jersey	Active	
**Zeta Eta**		Florida Institute of Technology	Melbourne, Florida	Active	
**Zeta Theta**		University of Central Arkansas	Conway, Arkansas	Active	
**Zeta Iota**		St. Mary's University, Texas	San Antonio, Texas	Active	
**Zeta Kappa**		City University of Seattle	Bellevue, Washington	Active	
**Zeta Lambda**		Marist College	Poughkeepsie, New York	Active	
**Zeta Mu**		University of North Alabama	Florence, Alabama	Active	
**Zeta Nu**		Norfolk State University	Norfolk, Virginia	Active	
**Zeta Xi**		State University of New York at Cortland	Cortland, New York	Active	
**Zeta Omicron**		Petro Mohyla State University	Mykolayiv, Ukraine	Active	
**Zeta Pi**		Elmhurst University	Elmhurst, Illinois	Active	
**Zeta Rho**		Cabrini University	Radnor Township, Pennsylvania	Active	
**Zeta Sigma**		James Madison University	Harrisonburg, Virginia	Active	
**Zeta Tau**		Sonoma State University	Rohnert Park, California	Active	
**Zeta Upsilon**		Augustana College	Rock Island, Illinois	Active	
**Zeta Phi**		Northern Kentucky University	Highland Heights, Kentucky	Active	
**Zeta Chi**		Coastal Carolina University	Conway, South Carolina	Active	
**Zeta Psi**		Mississippi State University	Mississippi State, Mississippi	Active	
**Zeta Omega**		Kennesaw State University	Cobb County, Georgia	Active	
**Eta Alpha**		Cheyney University of Pennsylvania	Cheyney, Pennsylvania	Active	
**Eta Beta**		Bennett College	Greensboro, North Carolina	Active	
**Eta Gamma**		Murray State University	Murray, Kentucky	Active	
**Eta Delta**		University of North Carolina at Greensboro	Greensboro, North Carolina	Active	
**Eta Epsilon**		Western Illinois University	Macomb, Illinois	Active	
**Eta Zeta**		Emmanuel College	Boston, Massachusetts	Active	
**Eta Eta**		Angelo State University	San Angelo, Texas	Active	
**Eta Theta**		Lincoln University	Jefferson City, Missouri	Active	
**Eta Iota**		Fairfield University	Fairfield, Connecticut	Active	
**Eta Kappa**		University of Michigan–Flint	Flint, Michigan	Active	
**Eta Lambda**		College of Staten Island	Staten Island, New York	Active	
**Eta Mu**		Northwestern State University	Natchitoches, Louisiana	Active	
**Eta Nu**		Bridgewater State University	Bridgewater, Massachusetts	Active	
**Eta Xi**		Southeastern Louisiana University	Hammond, Louisiana	Active	
**Eta Omicron**		State University of New York at Oswego	Oswego, New York	Active	
**Eta Pi**		Makarere University Business School	Nakawa Division, Kampala, Uganda	Active	
**Eta Rho**		Austin College	Sherman, Texas	Active	
**Eta Sigma**		Eastern Michigan University	Ypsilanti, Michigan	Active	
**Eta Tau**		Butler University	Indianapolis, Indiana	Active	
**Eta Upsilon**		University of Texas at Tyler	Tyler, Texas	Active	
**Eta Phi**		Barry University	Miami Shores, Florida	Active	
**Eta Chi**		Queens University of Charlotte	Charlotte, North Carolina	Active	
Eta Psi		Argosy University	Sarasota, Florida	Inactive	
**Eta Omega**		Chestnut Hill College	Philadelphia, Pennsylvania	Active	
**Theta Beta**		Northern Michigan University	Marquette, Michigan	Active	
**Theta Gamma**		Tennessee Tech	Cookeville, Tennessee	Active	
**Theta Delta**		University of Massachusetts Lowell	Lowell, Massachusetts	Active	
**Theta Epsilon**	April 5, 2016	Shepherd University	Shepherdstown, West Virginia	Active	
**Theta Zeta**		Miami Dade College	Westview, Florida	Active	
**Theta Eta**		University of Evansville	Evansville, Indiana	Active	
**Theta Eta**		Wabash College	Crawfordsville, Indiana	Active	
**Theta Theta**		California State University, Bakersfield	Bakersfield, California	Active	
**Theta Iota**	2017	College of Coastal Georgia	Brunswick, Georgia	Active	
**Theta Kappa**		Central Methodist University	Fayette, Missouri	Active	
**Theta Lambda**	2023	Virginia Commonwealth University	Richmond, Virginia	Active	
**Theta Mu**	2023	Embry–Riddle Aeronautical University, Daytona Beach	Daytona Beach, Florida	Active	
**Theta Nu**	2023	Moravian University	Bethlehem, Pennsylvania	Active	
**Theta Xi**	2023	West Chester University	West Chester, Pennsylvania	Active	
**Omega Omega**		Headquarters	San Bernardino, California	Active	

== Notable members ==
- Jaafar Aksikas, Professor of Cultural Studies and Media Studies at Columbia College Chicago
- Nilo Alcala (honorary), composer
- Mahamoud Adam Béchir (Beta Lambda, honorary), Chadian Ambassador to the United States and the Russian Federation
- Norman Borlaug, agronomist and Nobel Laureate
- Jerry Bradley, poet and university professor
- Horace Dawson (Beta Omicron, honorary), United States Ambassador to Botswana
- Larry Diamond, political scientist and sociologist
- Leonel Fernández (Gamma Sigma, honorary), President of the Dominican Republic
- Margarita Cedeño de Fernández Gamma Sigma, honorary), First Lady of the Dominican Republic
- Harriet Mayor Fulbright (Beta Eta, honorary), Executive Director of the President's Committee on the Arts and Humanities
- J. William Fulbright, (Beta Eta, honorary), United States Senator and founder of the Fulbright Program
- Seymour Martin Lipset, sociologist
- Obiwu, writer and professor
- Colin Powell (Gamma Sigma, honorary), United States secretary of state and chairman of the Joint Chiefs of Staff
- Bill Richardson, Governor of New Mexico and U.S. ambassador to the United Nations
- Miranda Teboh-Ewungkem, mathematician
- Rachel Thomas, computer scientist
- Minoti Vaishnav, songwriter
- Daniel Asua Wubah, president of Millersville University of Pennsylvania

== See also ==
- Honor society
- Honor cords
