= Jerry Bradley (poet) =

American poet and university professor

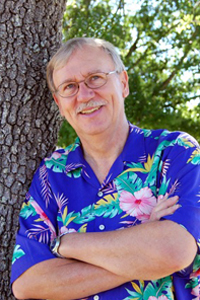
Jerry W. Bradley, Ph.D.

Jerry W. Bradley is an American poet and university professor.

== Life and work ==
=== Early years ===
Jerry Bradley was born in Jacksboro, Texas in 1948, the son of Carmon Jackson Bradley, a career U.S. Army veteran, and Beatrice Zella Hale Bradley. He spent his early youth in various military towns, including Munich and Frankfurt, Germany, and Camp Bullis near San Antonio, where his father was range commander. He then moved with his parents and two older siblings to Mineral Wells, Texas, following his father's retirement in 1956.

Bradley graduated from Mineral Wells High School in 1965 and attended Midwestern University (now Midwestern State University) in Wichita Falls as a member of the Honors Program, graduating with a B.A. in English in 1969. At Midwestern he was student body president (1968–69) editor of the student newspaper, The Wichitan, (1967–68), and a prize-winning intercollegiate debater. He was inducted into Pi Kappa Delta in 1967, the national forensics honor society. After graduation from Midwestern, Bradley enrolled in the graduate English program at Texas Christian University (TCU) in Fort Worth, where he earned his M.A. in 1973 and his Ph.D. in 1975.

=== Career ===
After receiving his Ph.D., Bradley became an assistant professor at Boston University. In 1976 he joined the New Mexico Institute of Mining and Technology (New Mexico Tech) in Socorro, where he became chair of the Department of Humanities in 1984. At New Mexico Tech, with Professor John Rothfork, he founded New Mexico Humanities Review in 1978 and continued as editor until 1993. Bradley has been the poetry editor of Concho River Review since 1999. While in New Mexico, Bradley published his first volume of poetry, Simple Versions of Disaster, which received critical praise in numerous reviews (see Reviews below). Bradley is listed in the Handbook of Texas Online among poets who have "written verse attempting to come to grips with the specific local facts of Texas culture and history."

In 1993 Bradley became Dean of Humanities at Indiana University Southeast. While in Indiana he wrote The Movement: British Poets of the 1950s, a critical study of nine English writers: Philip Larkin, Kingsley Amis, D. J. Enright, Robert Conquest, John Wain, Elizabeth Jennings, Donald Davie, Thom Gunn, and John Holloway. He has also published academic papers on Wallace Stevens, William Wordsworth, Samuel Beckett Edgar Allan Poe, Philip Larkin, Alan Sillitoe, David Wagoner, and others.

Bradley returned to his home state of Texas in 1994 to chair the Department of English at West Texas A&M University in Canyon. In his first year there he founded the West Texas A&M summer writing program, which continued under his leadership until 2001. Also while at West Texas, Bradley became poetry editor of Concho River Review, a bi-annual literary magazine sponsored by the English Department at Angelo State University. In 1999 Bradley was inducted into the prestigious Texas Institute of Letters.

In 2001 Bradley became Dean of Graduate Studies, Associate Vice-President of Research, and Professor of English at Lamar University in Beaumont. In 2007 he stepped down as dean to write and teach full-time at Lamar. He actively promotes literature by participating in poetry festivals and workshops and was Guest Poet at the 2012 Houston Poetry Fest. Bradley's graduate and undergraduate students have won numerous writing awards in the Texas Association of Creative Writing Teachers annual competition. The Southwest/Texas Popular Culture Association honored Bradley in 2000 by naming the annual prize for the top graduate student in creative writing the Jerry Bradley Award.

Bradley is active in various professional literary organizations and has served in leadership positions in many of them, including the Texas Institute of Letters (executive council, 2002–2007); the South Central Modern Language Association (chair, regional fiction, 1991; science fiction, 1993; southern literature, 2001; creative writing, 2002; regional poets, 2013); the Texas Association of Creative Writing Teachers (president, 1995–97), the Popular Culture Association (chair, fiction 2004–2012); and Southwest/Texas Popular Culture Association (president, 1998–2000 and chair, creative writing, 1992–2018); the Conference of College Teachers of English (president, 2009); and the Austin Poetry Society (judge, The Orpheus Award, 2007, The President's Award, 2010, and The Neill Megaw Memorial Award, 2012).

In addition to Pi Kappa Delta, Bradley is a member of several other honorary societies. He was inducted into Phi Beta Delta, the international honor society for scholars, in 1996 and the international collegiate honor society for students of English, Sigma Tau Delta, in 2003.

Bradley has published more than 200 poems in numerous literary journals including New England Review, Modern Poetry Studies, Southern Humanities Review, Descant, and American Literary Review. He also has been featured in the Texas Poetry Calendar competition; his poem "Flying with Crows" won second place in the 2010 calendar. Electronic journals in which Bradley's poems appear include Right Hand Pointing, Chest, SCOL: Scholarship and Creativity Online, A Journal of the Texas College English Association, Poetry Magazine, and Weber Studies. Bradley's poem "How the Big Thicket Got Smaller" (originally published in Southwestern Review in 1981) was highlighted on the home page of the Big Thicket Association's website. This poem has been included in three anthologies: Billy Bob Hill, editor, Texas in Poetry 2 (Fort Worth: TCU Press, 2002) and Rick Bass, editor, Falling from Grace: A Literary Response to the Demise of Paradise (San Antonio: Wings Press, 2004), and A Student's Treasury of Texas Verse (Fort Worth: TCU Press, 2007). In 2011 Bradley was the featured poet in Red River Review.

Although Jerry Bradley is known most widely for his poetry, he is also a fiction writer. Anthologies and magazines containing Bradley's short fiction include: Of Burgers and Barrooms: Stories and Poems, Big Tex[t], Suddenly,Volunteer Periwinkles, A Shared Voice, Texas Told 'Em, Texas Short Stories, and New Texas 95.

The 2012 Texas Poet Laureate, Jan Seale, wrote: "Bradley's Poetry often speaks in dazzling contradictions yet is capable in turn of bleak lament, playfulness, and deep-down unabashed love. In a poetry world where posturing and words-for-words' sake are too often the norm, Jerry Bradley's poems, in their quiet artistry, make sense and foster deep emotions. He shows the tenderness of the human predicament, pressing wit and chutzpah into service as necessary solace."

Jerry Bradley received the highest faculty award, University Professor, at Lamar University in 2014. That same year he was given the Anne Die Hasselmo Faculty Excellence Award from Lamar and was named a Piper Professor by the Minnie Stevens Foundation, a state-wide professorship. He was honored as the Leland Best Distinguished Faculty Fellow at Lamar, 2016–2020.

== Personal life ==
Jerry Bradley currently resides in Beaumont, Texas, with his wife, the writer Barrie Scardino Bradley.

== Honors and awards ==
- Distinguished Leadership Award, Southwest/Texas Popular Culture Association and American Culture Association, 2009
- Frances Hernandez Teacher-Scholar Award, Conference of College Teachers of English, 2005
- Outstanding Alumnus, Midwestern State University College of Liberal Arts, 2002
- Joe D. Thomas Scholar/Teacher of the Year, Texas College English Association, 2000
- British Literature Award, Conference of College Teachers of English, 1996
- Margie B. Boswell Poetry Award, Texas Christian University, 1996

== Works ==
- South of the Boredom (Fort Worth: Angelina River Press, 2017)
- The Great American Wiseass Poetry Anthology, editor with Ulf Kirchdorfer (Beaumont, TX: Lamar University Literary Press, 2016)
- Crownfeathers and Effigies (Beaumont, TX: Lamar University Literary Press, 2014)
- The Importance of Elsewhere (Temple, TX: Ink Brush Press, 2010)
- Famous Writers of American Literature with Samio Watanabe and Jerry Craven (Tokyo: Asahi Shuppansha, 1997)
- Famous Writers of British Literature with Samio Watanabe and Jerry Craven (Tokyo: Asahi Shuppansha, 1997)
- The Movement: British Poets of the 1950s (New York: Macmillan, 1993)
- Simple Versions of Disaster (Denton: University of North Texas Press, 1991)

=== Further reading ===
- "Jerry Bradley," Who's Who in America, 61st edition, 2007.
- "Jerry Bradley," Outstanding Writers of the 20th Century, 1999.
- "Jerry Bradley," International Who's Who in Poetry and Poets' Encyclopedia, 1999.

=== Reviews ===
- Reposa, Carol Coffee. "South of the Boredom", Volices de la Luna" A Quarterly Literature & Arts Magazine, 10:3, 15 May 2018: 40.
- Brennan, Matthew. South of the Boredom", Valparaiso Poetry Review, 29:2, 2018.
- Hoerth, Katherine. "South of the Boredom", The [Beaumont] Examiner, 8 February 2018.
- Gyasi, Geosi. "Crownfeathers and Effigies", Goesi Reads.wordpress.com, 23 January 2016.
- Johnson, Gretchen. "Crownfeathers and Effigies", Concho River Review, 29:1 Spring 2015:91.
- Texas Book Lover.com. "Crownfeathers and Effigies", 9 June 2014.
- Brennan, Matthew. "The Importance of Elsewhere", American Book Review, 31:2, 2010:29.
- Oliphant, Dave. "The Importance of Elsewhere", Southwestern American Literature, 35:1, 2009:98.
- Dromgoole, Glenn. "Books on Texas Poetry, Pecans and Architecture", Beaumont Enterprise, 2 August 2009:6B.
- Seale, Jan. "Poetry Here and Now", Texas Books in Review, 29:2, 2009:16.
- Wegner, John. "The Importance of Elsewhere", Concho River Review, 23:2, 2009: 138-39.
- Gwynn, R. S. "Simple Versions of Disaster", Review of Texas Books, 6:3, 1994:3.
- Barton, D. A. "The Movement: British Poets of the 1950s", Choice, January 1994:778.
- Reimers, Valerie. "The Movement: British Poets of the 1950s", The Texas Writer's Newsletter, 62, 1993:22-23.
- "The Good Cop and the Bad Cop Meet the Poet: A Review of Jerry Bradley's Simple Versions of Disaster", Concho River Review, 6:2, 1992:80.
- Heaberlin, Dick. "Simple Versions of Disaster", Western American Literature, 27:3, 1992: 271-73.
- JAR, "Simple Versions of Disaster", Books of the Southwest, 398, 1992.
- Castleman, David. "Simple Versions of Disaster", Dusty Dog Reviews, 4-5, 1992:27.
- Reynolds, Clay. "Poets Speak of Life, Love, Happiness and Reality", Fort Worth Star Telegram, 26 April 1992:12E.
- Robertson, Pauline. "All Comes to Gloom", Amarillo News-Globe, 7 June 1992.
- Colquitt, Betsy. "Three Memorable Poetry Collections 'Deserve Our Thanks'", Texas Books in Review, 11:4, 1991:18-19.
- Fisher, Mary M. "Book Reviews", North San Antonio Times, 18 July 1991.
- Milner, Jay. "Turning Pages", Lufkin Daily News, 25 August 1991:4C.
- Reynolds, Clay. "Jerry Bradley's Simple Versions of Disaster", Concho River Review, 5:2, 1991:106-07.
- "Simple Versions of Disaster", Texas Writer's Newsletter, 57, 1991:6.
