= Daniel Asua Wubah =

American academic

Daniel A. Wubah
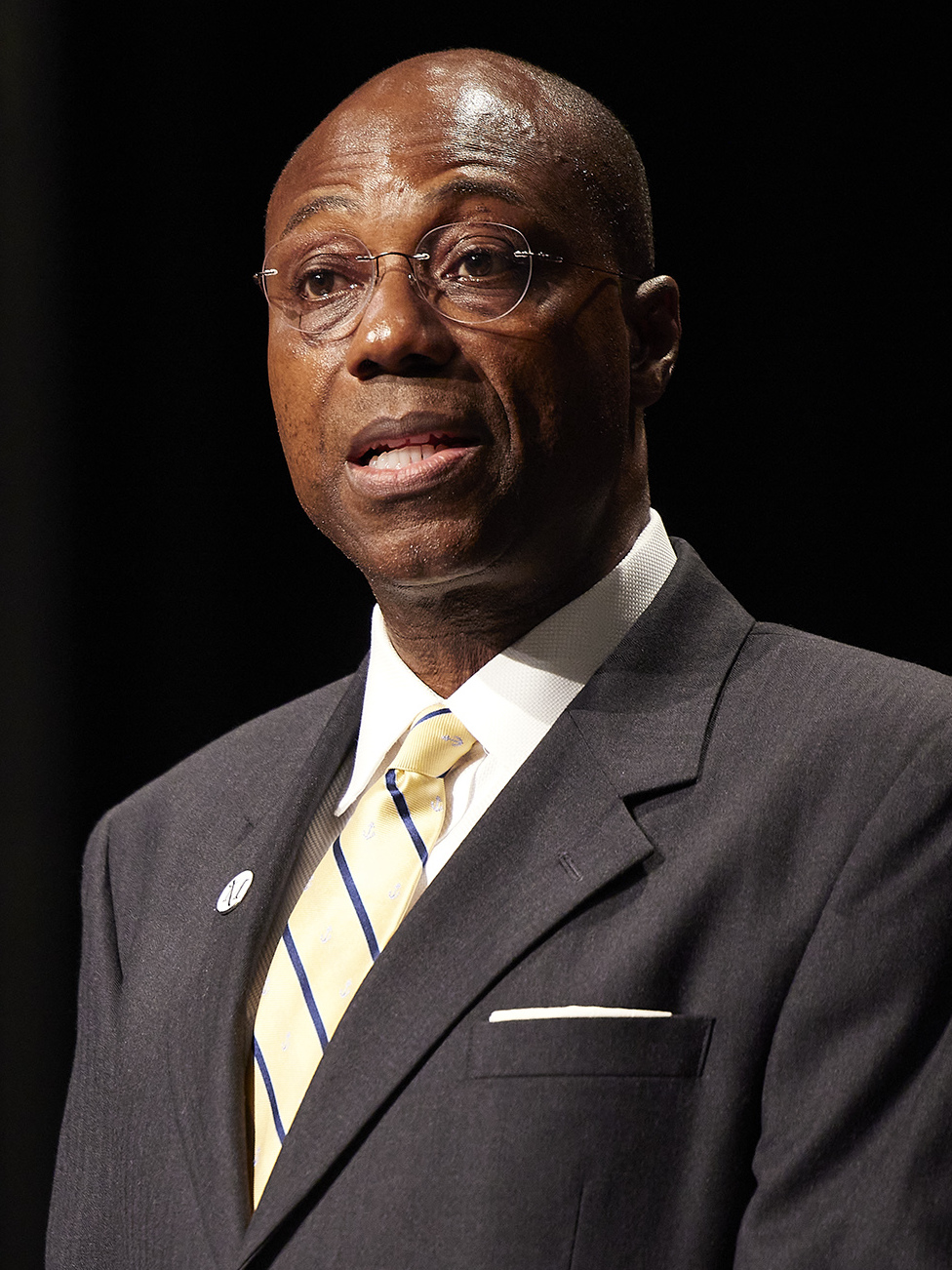

President of Millersville University
- Incumbent
- Assumed office July 1, 2018

Personal details
- Born: Accra, Ghana
- Spouse: Judith A. Wubah
- Education: University of Cape Coast (B.S.(Hons) Dip.Ed.), University of Akron(M.S.), University of Georgia (Ph.D.)
- Occupation: Professor & University President

Daniel Asua Wubah is a Ghanaian-born American president of Millersville University of Pennsylvania. Prior to that he was the Provost at Washington and Lee University. In his private life, Wubah is a tribal king, Nana Ofosu Peko III, Safohene of Breman Traditional Area in Ghana. He is the first Ghanaian-born president of an American university.

== Early life ==
Daniel Wubah was born in Accra, Ghana. Both of his parents were Akan royals; his father, Daniel A. Wubah II, was from the Twidan Royal family of Breman Asikuma, Central Region, and his mother, Elizabeth Appoe, was from the royal family of Krokorshwe, Central Region. He grew up in Accra with 2 brothers and a sister.

Wubah attended Accra Academy from 1972 to 1979 for his GCE Ordinary and Advanced Levels of education. He earned a bachelor's degree in Botany and a diploma in science education from the University of Cape Coast in Ghana, a Master of Science in biology from the University of Akron, and a Ph.D. in Botany and Microbiology from the University of Georgia. He was a postdoctoral fellow at the US Environmental Protection Agency Research Lab, in Athens, GA.

== Career ==
Wubah started his academic career as a faculty member in the Department of Biological Sciences at Towson University in Maryland and served as the department head from 1997 to 2000. He was Associate Dean in the College of Science and Mathematics at James Madison University (JMU) for three years before being appointed the Special Assistant to the President. Among his accomplishments was the establishment of the Centennial Scholars Program and other programs to diversify the student-faculty and staff at JMU. In 2007, he became the Associate Provost for Undergraduate Affairs at the University of Florida. He moved to Virginia Tech as the Vice President and Dean for Undergraduate Education in 2009. He was promoted to the Deputy Provost in 2010 and 2013, he was appointed the Provost at Washington and Lee University. He served on the task force that developed a Strategic Transition Plan for the W&L Law School to ensure financial sustainability.

As a microbiologist, he studied the characterization of obligately anaerobic zoosporic fungi, bench scale bioremediation of toxic polychlorinated biphenyls, and characterization of microflora in the digestive tract of neotropical wood-eating catfish Panaque. His research has been supported with grants from The National Science Foundation, National Institutes of Health and US Department of Agriculture. He was a member of a National Academy of Sciences panel that studied the scientific basis for estimating air emissions from animal feeding operations. He has supervised or co-supervised research projects and served on thesis/dissertation committees for ninety-six undergraduate and ten graduate students.

He led the development of the College of Business at Millersville University (MU) during his first year as president. Recently, Millersville University signed an MOU with his alma mater, University of Cape Coast, to enhance student and faculty exchange. Under his leadership, MU has established articulation agreements with Thaddeus Stevens College of Technology and Harrisburg Area Community College.

He was an Associate Editor for Mycologia, and a member of the editorial board of Frontiers: the interdisciplinary journal on study abroad. He has extensive service-related activity including membership on the Advisory Committees for the NSF Directorate of Biology, Office of International Science and Engineering as well as Environmental Research and Education. He served as a member and chaired the National Institute of Minority Health Disparities Study Session (2005-2014). He was a trustee of the Southern Association of Colleges and Schools Commission on Colleges (SACS-COC) for two three-year terms.

At Virginia Tech, Wubah developed a unique undergraduate research program called Scieneering that was funded by the Howard Hughes Medical Institute He has taught undergraduate and graduate level courses including general microbiology, medical microbiology, microbial ecology and mycology. His scholarly work has resulted in more than 60 peer-reviewed journal publications, book chapters, and technical reports. At Washington and Lee University, he was involved in handling demands made by law students to move Confederate flags from the Lee Chapel.

== Honors ==
Wubah was awarded an honorary Doctorate in Strategic Leadership (DSL) by the University of Cape Coast in August 2023.

Wubah is an elected Fellow of the American Association for the Advancement of Science.

He presented a testimony to the Research Subcommittee of the US Congress House of Representatives.

=== Societies ===
- Fellow, African Scientific Institute. February 2020
- Member, Omicron Delta Kappa. December 2019
- Fellow, American Association for the Advancement of Science. November 2014
- Life member, Beta Beta Beta, Honor Society for Biology. March 2014
- Honorary Member, Phi Beta Delta, Honor Society for International Education. October 2009.
- Honorary Member, Beta Gamma Sigma, Honor Society for Business Students. November 2007
- Member, Sigma Xi. July 1993

=== Other awards/recognitions ===
- PA City and State Power Higher Education Power 100, April 2022; April 2023; April 2024
- Power 100, Central Penn Business Journal. March 2021; March 2022; March 2023; March 2024
- Martin Luther King Community Service Award, Alpha Phi Alpha. JMU Chapter. January 2004
- Diversity Scholar Award, American Institute of Biological Sciences. March 2001.
- Industrial and Academic Partnership Board Outstanding Faculty of the Year, Towson University College of Natural Science and Mathematics (highest award given to a faculty at the college level). September 1997.
