= Lem Tucker =

American journalist (1938–1991)

Lemuel Tucker (May 26, 1938 – March 2, 1991) was an American journalist.

Born in Saginaw, Michigan, Tucker graduated from Central Michigan University in 1960.

Tucker was one of the first African Americans to work as a television network reporter. He began his career at NBC in 1965 as a general assignment news correspondent, and served as news director at WOR-TV in New York City from 1970 to 1971. He moved to ABC in 1972 and to CBS in 1977, where he worked until his death.

He was a winner of two Emmy Awards, and made the master list of Nixon political opponents for his reporting.

Although Lem Tucker's life was brief, his career accomplishments were memorable.

Tucker was the first African American elected to the position of student body president at CMU. That election took place when less than one percent of the student body was black. Previous to his election, only one other African American had been elected to a similar position in the United States. While at Central, Tucker was considered one of the university's top forensic students. He served as a chapter president of Pi Kappa Delta, a national speech honorary fraternity.

He won his first Emmy in 1979 for his coverage of Black America and his second in 1983 for a series about hunger in America. While working for the networks, he covered numerous major news events, including the Vietnam War, the Kent State University shootings and the Iran hostage crisis. He covered social unrest and riots in Newark, Miami and Harlem. He also reported from the Woodstock Festival. In 1981, he was covering President Ronald Reagan's speech at the Washington Hilton Hotel and witnessed the shooting of the president. He was broadcasting live reports on CBS Radio within minutes of the incident. He was applauded by his colleagues and others in the media for his continuous and thorough coverage, which he provided well into the next morning.

During the course of his career, Tucker returned numerous times to his alma mater to speak to students about politics, share reflections on college life and offer insight regarding work as a national network correspondent.

Tucker had a keen sense of humor. In an address given to the CMU community in the early 1980s, he told his audience he was amused to have been asked back to speak at the university, given that during his days as student body president, he "quibbled a lot" with the administration. He said, "How rare for me to be given a microphone and be invited to speak at CMU. Now I am on stage in front of administration and applauded."

Tucker has one daughter, Linn Carol Tucker.

His death in 1991 was due to liver failure.
