= Daniel Dorchester =

- Born: January 25, 1790; Vernon
- Died: August 6, 1854 (aged 64); Chicago
- Occupation: Priest; librarian

Daniel Dorchester (January 25, 1790 – August 6, 1854) was an American Methodist Episcopal minister. He was born at Vernon, Connecticut, January 25, 1790. He was drafted for service in the war of 1812, and soon after his term of military duty expired he was licensed to preach. In 1816 he entered the traveling ministry in the New England Conference, and served as minister and presiding elder until his final superannuation in 1850. He defended Methodism in a time when it was "much spoken against." On many of his circuits there were extensive revivals. In 1853 he went to the West; in 1854 was made librarian of the public library and reading-room in Chicago, and died near that city August 6, 1854.
