= Gregg Lambert =

American philosopher

- Born: 1961 (age 64–65)

Education
- Education: Pacific University; University of California, Berkeley; University of California, Irvine

Philosophical work
- Institutions: Syracuse University

Gregg Lambert (born 1961) is an American philosopher and academic who serves as Dean’s Professor of the Humanities at Syracuse University in New York. His research focuses on contemporary continental philosophy, particularly the works of Gilles Deleuze and Michel Foucault, and the relationships between philosophy, political theory, literature and biopolitics. His books include Philosophy After Friendship: Deleuze’s Conceptual Personae (2017), The Elements of Foucault (2020), The World Is Gone: Philosophy in Light of the Pandemic (2022) and In Search of a New Image of Thought: Gilles Deleuze and Philosophical Expressionism (2025). His other work, the Immanence of a Crisis, examines crisis, environment and political life in the aftermath of the COVID-19 pandemic.

== Biography ==
Lambert earned a bachelor's degree in English from Pacific University in 1983 and an MA in English and Creative Writing from Portland State University in 1984. Between 1984 and 1987, Lambert was a Fellow in the Center for Hermeneutic Studies at the Graduate Theological Union, where he completed a Masters program in Theology and Literature, and graduate studies in French and Comparative Literature at the University of California, Berkeley. In 1995 he received a Ph.D. in Comparative Literature and Critical Theory from the University of California, Irvine under the direction of the late-French philosopher Jacques Derrida.

In 1996, Lambert joined the Department of English at Syracuse University and was later appointed as Chair between 2005 and 2008, before leaving the department to become the founding director of the Syracuse University Humanities Center. Since 2008, Lambert was also Principal Investigator of the Central New York Humanities Corridor. In 2013 he established the permanent endowment of the CNY Humanities Corridor over seven million dollars from a matching award by the Andrew W. Mellon Foundation, endowment announcement and was elected as a member of the International Advisory Board of the Consortium of Humanities Centers and Institutes.

== Research and scholarly work ==
Lambert’s research focuses on continental philosophy, critical theory, and the relationship between philosophy and political thought. His work examines the writings of Gilles Deleuze, Michel Foucault, and Jacques Derrida, as well as their connections to other philosophical traditions.

=== Conceptual Personae ===
In Philosophy After Friendship: Deleuze’s Conceptual Personae (2017), Lambert examines the role of friendship in Western philosophy and political thought. The book focuses on concepts of friendship relate to political community, democracy, fraternity and social conflict. Published by the University of Minnesota Press, the book was released in an open-access edition on the press’s Manifold platform in 2024.

=== Biopolitics ===
In The Elements of Foucault (2020), Lambert examines Michel Foucault’s concepts of biopower and biopolitics, focusing on sovereignty, discipline, security and the regulation of populations. He discusses how political power operates through institutions, spatial arrangements and systems of social organization. The book also addresses Foucault’s concept of governmentality and its application to modern political and social life.

=== Philosophy and pandemic ===
In The World Is Gone: Philosophy in Light of the Pandemic (2022), Lambert examines the philosophical implications of the COVID-19 pandemic, particularly the effects of isolation, social restrictions and the disruption of everyday life. Lambert focuses on phenomenology and continental philosophy, and he considers how the pandemic changed people's relationships with others and their experience of the shared world. The book explores the role of social relations in human existence and considers how the loss of ordinary forms of contact challenged established understandings of community, social life and being-in-the-world.

=== The Immanence of a Crisis ===
In The Immanence of a Crisis, Lambert examines crisis as a condition arising from interactions between natural processes, human activity and environmental conditions. Drawing on the biological concept of le milieu, associated with Jean-Baptiste Lamarck, Lambert considers how living organisms interact with their surroundings and how these relationships shape individual and collective responses to crisis. His discussion draws on the writings of Michel Foucault, Alfred North Whitehead, Gilles Deleuze, Georges Canguilhem and Michel de Montaigne.

The first part, “Le Milieu (The Fourth Element),” examines the environment as a condition of life and an object of political intervention. Lambert considers how biological and social environments shape experiences of crisis and how governments manage populations through sovereignty, discipline and security. He also draws on Whitehead's account of life as a process involving appropriation, destruction and the pursuit of intensity.

The second part, “The Winters of Our Discontent,” examines resilience, political resistance and revolutionary movements. Lambert traces the use of resilience from the physical sciences to psychology, economics and political theory, including its prominence during the COVID-19 pandemic. He considers how governments and institutions apply the concept to social and economic disruption, alongside Foucault's idea of counter-conducts and the role of revolutionary movements.

=== In Search of a New Image of Thought: Gilles Deleuze and Philosophical Expressionism ===
In Search of a New Image of Thought: Gilles Deleuze and Philosophical Expressionism (2012; Manifold open-access edition, 2025), Lambert examines Gilles Deleuze's account of philosophical thought and expression. He focuses on the development of Deleuze's concept of the image of thought through his writings on Marcel Proust, Franz Kafka and modern cinema. Lambert also examines the relationship between philosophy, literature and cinema, including the influence of these forms on Deleuze's work with Félix Guattari.

Perpetual Peace Project

Lambert participated in the Perpetual Peace Project, a public humanities initiative that ran from 2008 to 2022. Based on Immanuel Kant's essay Toward Perpetual Peace, the project examined the philosophical and political questions surrounding peace, conflict and relations between nations and communities.

== Publications ==
=== Books ===
- 2021 ‘’The World is Gone: Philosophy in Light of the Pandemic’’ ISBN 9781517913380.
- 2021 Towards a Geopolitical Image of Thought ISBN 9781474482943.
- 2021 The People are Missing: Minor Literature Today ISBN 9781496224316.
- 2020 The Elements of Foucault ISBN 9781517908782.
- 2018 Gilles Deleuze o Literature: mezi umēním, animalitou a politikou ISBN 9788087956915.
- 2017 Philosophy After Friendship: Deleuze’s Conceptual Personae, ISBN 9781517901004.
- 2016 Return Statements: The Return of Religion in Contemporary Philosophy, ISBN 9781474413916.
- 2013 Who's Afraid of Deleuze and Guattari? (Korean translation) ISBN 9788957077900.
- 2012 In Search of a New Image of Thought: Gilles Deleuze and Philosophical Expressionism, ISBN 9780816678037.
- 2008 On the (New) Baroque, ISBN 1888570970.
- 2006 Who’s Afraid of Deleuze and Guattari?, ISBN 9781847060099.
- 2004 The Return of the Baroque in Modern Culture, ISBN 9780826466488.
- 2002 The Non-Philosophy of Gilles Deleuze, ISBN 9780826459558.
- 2001 Report to the Academy (re: The New Conflict of Faculties), ISBN 9781888570618.

=== Edited volumes ===
- 2012 (with Daniel W. Smith) Deleuze: a Philosophy of the Event, ISBN 9780748645855.
- 2006 (with Victor E. Taylor) Jean Francois Lyotard: Critical Evaluations in Cultural Theory, ISBN 9780415338196.
- 2006 (with Aaron Levy) ‘’ Rrrevolutionnaire: Conversations in Theory, Vol. 1’’ ISBN 0971484872.
- 2005 (with Ian Buchanan) Deleuze and Space, ISBN 9780748618743.
