= 1956 Texas gubernatorial election =

- November 6, 1956
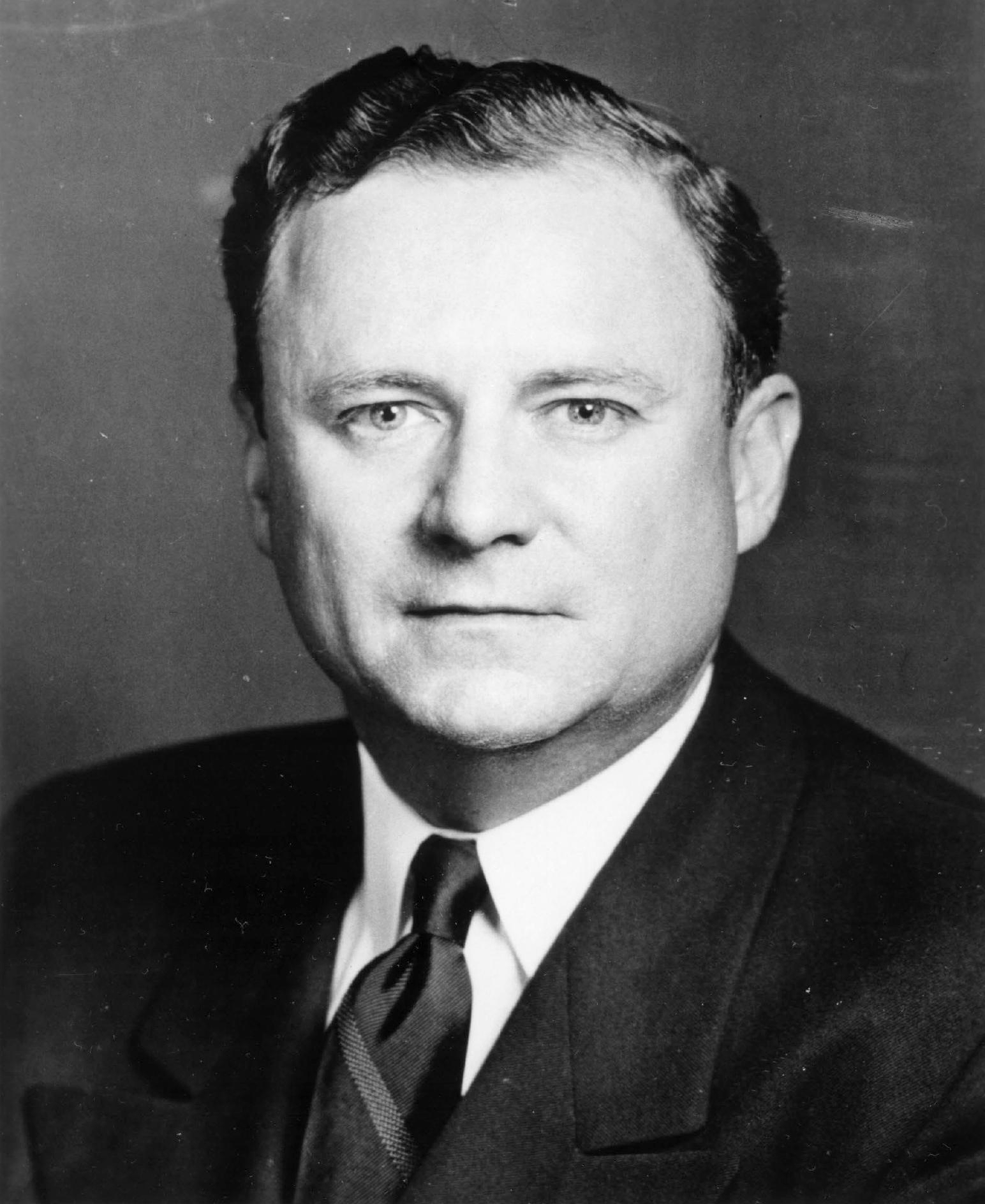

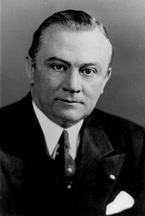
Nominee	Price Daniel	William R. Bryant	W. Lee O'Daniel (write-in)
Party	Democratic	Republican	Democratic
Popular vote	1,350,736	261,283	110,234
Percentage	78.43%	15.17%	6.40%
- County results Daniel: 50–60% 60–70% 70–80% 80–90% >90% No Vote
Governor before election
Allan Shivers
Democratic
Elected Governor
Price Daniel
Democratic

The 1956 Texas gubernatorial election was held on November 6, 1956, to elect the governor of Texas. Incumbent Democratic governor Allan Shivers did not run for a fourth term. Senator Price Daniel won the election with over 78% of the vote.

== Primaries ==
=== Democratic ===
Democratic primary results
Party	Candidate	Votes	%
Democratic	Price Daniel	628,914	39.88%
Democratic	Ralph Yarborough	463,416	29.39%
Democratic	W. Lee O'Daniel	347,757	22.05%
Democratic	J. Evetts Haley	88,772	5.63%
Democratic	Reuben Senterfitt	37,774	2.40%
Democratic	J. J. Holmes	10,165	0.64%
Total votes		1,576,870	100.00%

Runoff results by county Daniel: Daniel—80–90%; Daniel—70–80%; Daniel—60–70%; Daniel—50–60%; Yarborough: Yarborough—50–60%; Yarborough—60–70%; Yarborough—70–80%; Yarborough—80–90%; Yarborough—>90%

Democratic runoff results
Party	Candidate	Votes	%
Democratic	Price Daniel	698,001	50.11%
Democratic	Ralph Yarborough	694,830	49.89%
Total votes		1,392,831	100.00%

== Results ==
General election results
Party	Candidate	Votes	%
Democratic	Price Daniel	1,350,736	78.43%
Republican	William R. Bryant	261,283	15.17%
Write-In	W. Lee O'Daniel	110,234	6.40%
Total votes		1,722,253	100.00%
Democratic hold			
