= John S. Goff =

American historian (1931–2001)

John S. Goff (June 20, 1931 – April 8, 2001) was a college professor who studied Robert Todd Lincoln and the history of Arizona. He was active in historical organizations.

Goff in 1957

== Personal ==
Goff was born in Los Angeles, California, on June 20, 1931, to Samuel J. Goff and Elizabeth A. Wilhelm Goff and graduated from Inglewood High School in Inglewood, California, in June 1949, after which he attended Pepperdine College on its campus in Los Angeles. He graduated from the University of Southern California, where he also received a Ph.D. in history. His dissertation dealt with Robert Todd Lincoln, the son of Abraham Lincoln. He died on April 8, 2001, and was survived by his mother; a daughter, Margaret Elizabeth Goff, and a son, John Swafford Goff, all of Phoenix, Arizona.

== Academic career ==
In July 1957 Goff was appointed as an instructor in government and history at West Texas State College in Canyon, Texas. In 1960, he next taught at Phoenix College, where he was head of the Social Sciences Department and director of the Paralegal Program. He wrote books and articles on Arizona history with an emphasis on legal history. and he edited the records of the Arizona Constitutional Convention of 1910. He also wrote a biography of the son of President Abraham Lincoln. Goff was a member of the State Bar of Arizona and the Arizona Academy and was a director of the Arizona Historical Foundation and the Central Arizona chapter of the Arizona Historical Association. He was a member of Phi Alpha Theta, national history fraternity; Pi Sigma Alpha, and Pi Kappa Delta.

== Research ==
=== Publications ===
- Arizona Civilization, Hooper Publishing Corp., 185 pages with index and photos. "Dr. Goff writes with authority and detail."
- Robert Todd Lincoln, University of Oklahoma Press, 265 pages. It was "the only published biography of the president's eldest son." "Unfortunately, Goff does not make Lincoln speak. His 265 pages leave the reader tantalized but ill-informed." online free to borrow
- George W. P. Hunt and His Arizona, Socio-Technical Publications, Pasadena, California. It "came about as a result of a visit by Dr. Goff . . . to the state library in 1961 when Alice B. Good, then librarian, told him of the Hunt collection." Hunt was the first governor of Arizona.

=== Studies ===
Goff wrote for the Microsoft Encarta Encyclopedia. He also authored a series of articles about Arizona territorial officials.

In 1985, Goff was chosen by the Illinois State Historical Library to have the first access to the twenty thousand letters which Robert Todd Lincoln wrote between 1860 and 1920 and which were discovered in 1982. They had never been studied. Goff said he would revise his already-printed book on the younger Lincoln and hoped to have the work completed in 1987.
