= Robert A. Hurwitch =

American diplomat

United States Ambassador to the Dominican Republic
- In office September 5, 1973 – April 5, 1978
- President: Richard Nixon; Gerald Ford; Jimmy Carter
- Preceded by: Francis E. Meloy Jr.
- Succeeded by: Robert L. Yost

Personal details
- Born: October 15, 1920 Worcester, Massachusetts, U.S.
- Died: July 16, 1997 (aged 76) Scituate, Massachusetts, U.S.

Robert A. Hurwitch (October 15, 1920 – July 16, 1997) was an American diplomat who served as the United States Ambassador to the Dominican Republic from 1973 to 1978.

In 1979, Hurwitch pleaded guilty to "illegally using about $17,000 worth of embassy labor and supplies to build a swimming pool and prepare a retirement home for himself outside Santo Domingo." He was sentenced to two years' unsupervised probation.

Hurwitch graduated from the University of Chicago. He died of lung cancer on July 16, 1997, in Scituate, Massachusetts at age 76.
