= Francis E. Meloy Jr. =

American diplomat

United States Ambassador to Lebanon
- In office June 1, 1976 – June 16, 1976
- President: Gerald Ford
- Preceded by: G. McMurtrie Godley
- Succeeded by: Richard Bordeaux Parker

United States Ambassador to Guatemala
- In office February 7, 1974 – April 19, 1976
- President: Richard Nixon
- Preceded by: William G. Bowdler
- Succeeded by: Davis E. Boster

United States Ambassador to the Dominican Republic
- In office July 16, 1969 – August 6, 1973
- President: Richard Nixon
- Preceded by: John Hugh Crimmins
- Succeeded by: Robert A. Hurwitch

Personal details
- Born: Francis Edward Meloy Jr. March 28, 1917 Washington, D.C., U.S.
- Died: June 16, 1976 (aged 59) Beirut, Lebanon
- Cause of death: Assassination
- Profession: Diplomat

Francis Edward Meloy Jr. (March 28, 1917 – June 16, 1976) was an American diplomat. He was murdered in Beirut, Lebanon in 1976 by Lebanese leftist militants.

== Early life ==
Francis Edward Meloy Jr. was born in Washington, D.C., on March 28, 1917, to Francis E. Meloy Sr. a government employee and geographer and Anne Teresa Connor. He served in the United States Navy during World War II spending four years in naval intelligence as a reserve officer.

== Diplomatic career ==
After the war, he joined the State Department and 1946 he was posted Dhahran, Saudi Arabia as a vice consul. He returned in 1946 to Washington and served as the personal assistant to Secretary of State Dean Acheson until 1953. He resumed his career as a Foreign Service officer serving as a political officer in Saigon from 1953 until 1956 and then in Paris until 1959. In 1962 he was appointed as the Director of the Office of Western European Affairs until 1964, then as the deputy chief of mission in Rome. He was then promoted, serving as U.S. Ambassador to the Dominican Republic from 1969 to 1973, and Guatemala from 1973 to 1976. On April 21, 1976, President Gerald Ford appointed Meloy as Ambassador to Lebanon after the resignation of G. McMurtrie Godley due to illness. He would be approved by the Senate Foreign Relations Committee on April 27.

== Death ==
At 10:40 on June 16, 1976, in Beirut, Meloy, the incoming U.S. Ambassador to Lebanon, accompanied by Robert O. Waring, the U.S. Economic Counselor, was on his way to present his credentials to the new Lebanese President-elect Elias Sarkis. Meloy, Waring and their driver, Zuhair Mohammed Moghrabi, were kidnapped by Popular Front for the Liberation of Palestine members as they crossed the Green Line, the division between Beirut's Christian and Muslim sectors. Meloy had been in the country for a month, but not presented his credentials to the former president Suleiman Franjieh who had taken refuge outside Beirut and refused to step down.

By 21:30, Lebanese television announced their bullet-riddled bodies had been found on a garbage dump near the beach in Ramlet al-Baida.

== Aftermath ==
In 2013, a report released by the CIA said that Meloy was assassinated by an "extreme Lebanese leftist militia" that had links with the PFLP. A succeeding US Ambassador to Lebanon, John Gunther Dean later stated that to the best of his knowledge, the PLO had nothing to do with the murder. The 2013 CIA report noted that the PLO had arrested five over the assassination but released them for lack of sufficient evidence. The PLO handed two culprits to the PFLP and they were later executed, the report added.

== See also ==
- Ambassadors of the United States killed in office
- List of kidnappings
- Lists of solved missing person cases

Diplomatic posts
Preceded by John Hugh Crimmins	United States Ambassador to the Dominican Republic; July 1969 – August 1973	Succeeded by Robert A. Hurwitch
Preceded by William G. Bowdler	United States Ambassador to Guatemala; February 1974 – April 1976	Succeeded by Davis E. Boster
Preceded by G. McMurtrie Godley	United States Ambassador to Lebanon; June, 1976 – June 16, 1976	Succeeded by Richard Bordeaux Parker
