= 1964 United States Senate election in Texas =

- November 3, 1964
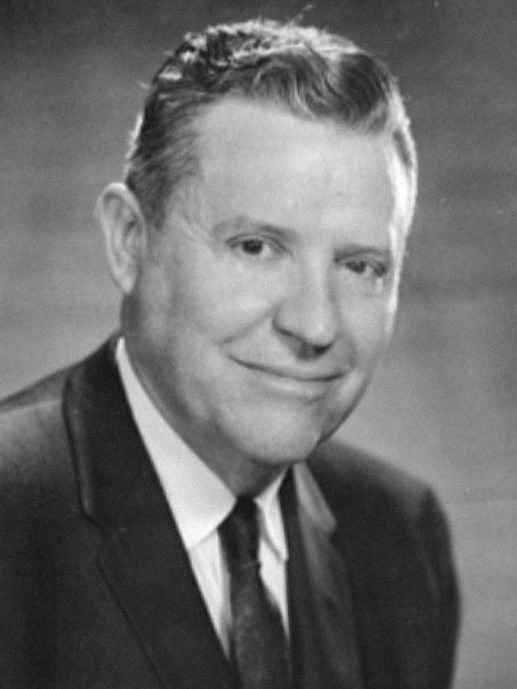

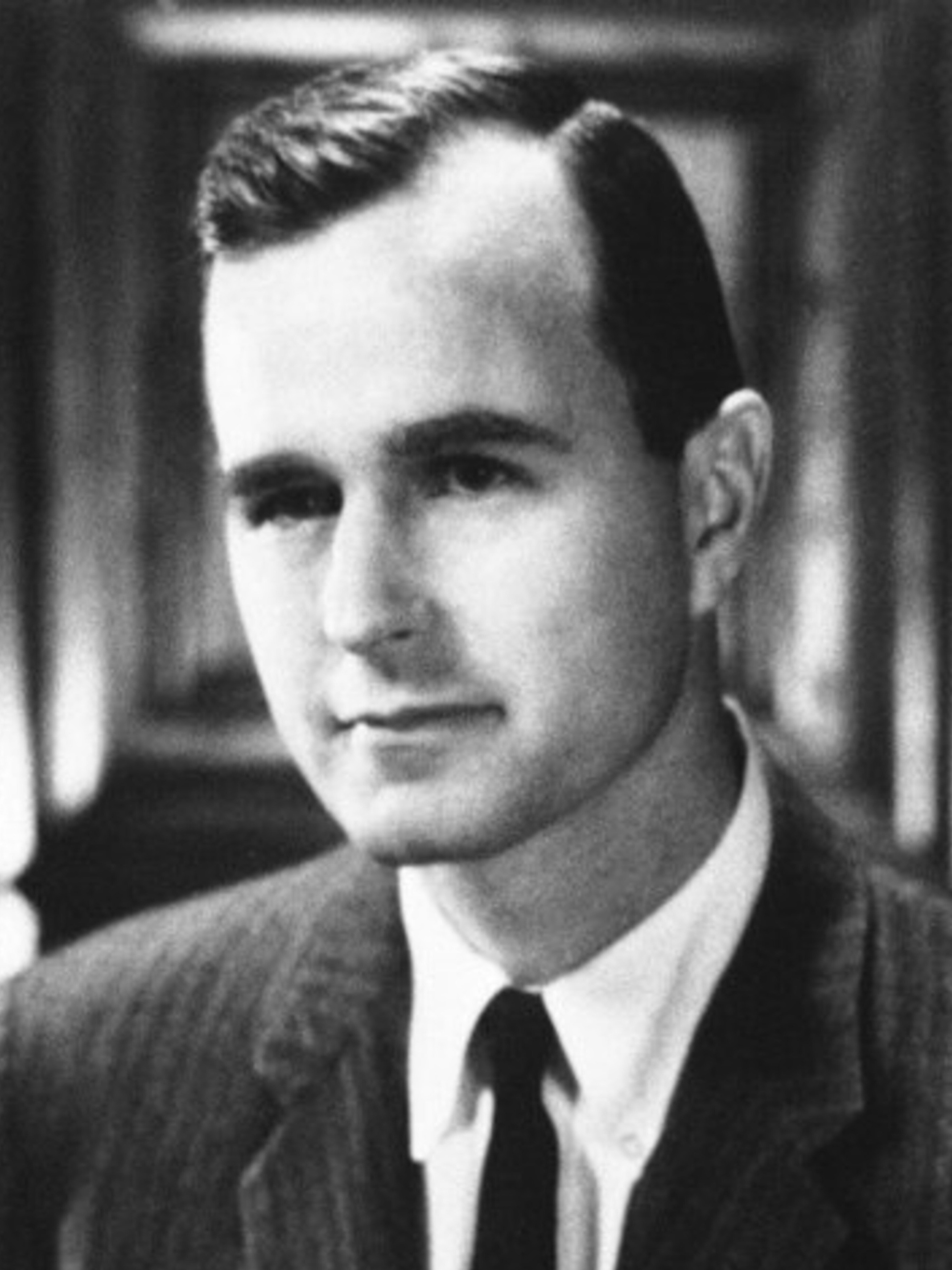
Nominee	Ralph Yarborough	George H. W. Bush
Party	Democratic	Republican
Popular vote	1,463,958	1,134,337
Percentage	56.22%	43.56%
- Yarborough: 40–50% 50–60% 60–70% 70–80% 80–90% >90% Bush: 50–60% 60–70% 70–80%
U.S. senator before election
Ralph Yarborough
Democratic
Elected U.S. Senator
Ralph Yarborough
Democratic

The 1964 United States Senate election in Texas was held on November 3, 1964. Incumbent Democratic US senator Ralph Yarborough defeated future US President George H. W. Bush handily, but Bush managed to put up the best performance for the Republicans in the popular vote in this seat up to that point. This would prove to be Yarborough's final term as a senator, as he was primaried by Lloyd Bentsen in 1970. Bush later went on to win an election for the US House of Representatives in 1966 and was subsequently elected US Vice President in 1980, re-elected in 1984, and was elected president in 1988.

== Democratic primary ==
Yarborough was challenged in the Democratic primary by radio broadcaster Gordon McLendon, a conservative Democrat. McLendon campaigned with Hollywood luminaries such as John Wayne, Chill Wills, and Robert Cummings, running on a platform of opposing the Civil Rights Act, arguing that it gave "broad and sweeping powers" to the federal government.

=== Candidates ===
- Gordon McLendon, radio broadcaster
- Ralph Yarborough, incumbent Senator since 1957

=== Results ===
1964 Democratic U.S. Senate primary
Party	Candidate	Votes	%
Democratic	Ralph Yarborough (incumbent)	904,811	57.36%
Democratic	Gordon McLendon	672,573	42.64%
Total votes		1,577,384	100.00%

== Republican primary ==
=== Candidates ===
- George H. W. Bush, former chairman of the Harris County Republican Party and son of former U.S. senator from Connecticut Prescott Bush
- Jack Cox, former state representative from Stephens County and nominee for Governor in 1962
- Milton Davis
- Robert J. Morris, former New York City Municipal Court judge, counsel to the U.S. Senate Judiciary Committee, and candidate for U.S. Senator from New Jersey in 1958 and 1960

=== Results ===
1964 Republican U.S. Senate primary
Party	Candidate	Votes	%
Republican	George H. W. Bush	62,985	44.08%
Republican	Jack Cox	45,561	31.89%
Republican	Robert J. Morris	28,279	19.79%
Republican	Milton Davis	6,067	4.25%
Total votes		142,892	100.00%

=== Runoff ===
1964 Republican U.S. Senate runoff
Party	Candidate	Votes	%
Republican	George H. W. Bush	49,751	62.12%
Republican	Jack Cox	30,333	37.88%
Total votes		80,084	100.00%

== General election ==
=== Results ===
1964 United States Senate election in Texas
Party	Candidate	Votes	%	±%
Democratic	Ralph Yarborough (incumbent)	1,463,958	56.22%	▼18.36
Republican	George H. W. Bush	1,134,337	43.56%	▲20.06
Constitution	Jack Carswell	5,542	0.21%	▼1.59
Total votes		2,603,837	100.0%	N/A
Democratic hold				

== See also ==
- 1964 United States Senate elections
