= 1964 Texas gubernatorial election =

- November 3, 1964
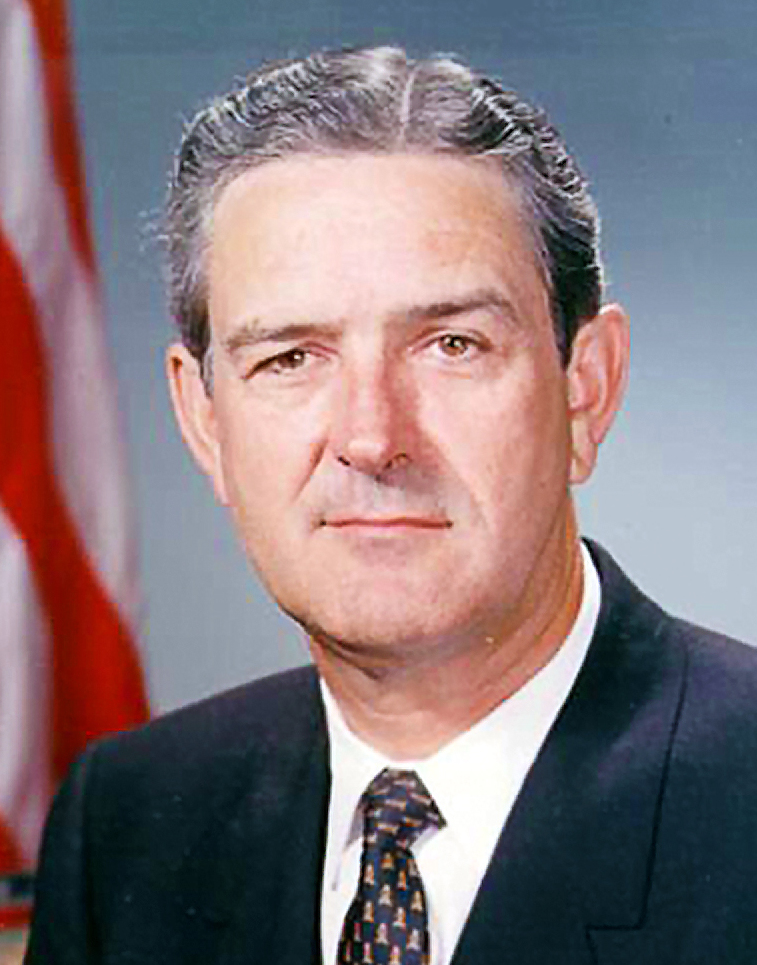

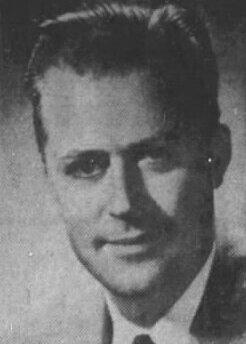
Nominee	John Connally	Jack Crichton
Party	Democratic	Republican
Popular vote	1,877,793	661,675
Percentage	73.79%	26.00%
- County results Connally: 50–60% 60–70% 70–80% 80–90% >90%
Governor before election
John Connally
Democratic
Elected Governor
John Connally
Democratic

The 1964 Texas gubernatorial election was held on November 3, 1964, to elect the governor of Texas. Incumbent Democratic governor John Connally was reelected to a second term, winning 74% of the vote to Republican Jack Crichton's 26%.

Connally swept all 254 counties in his massive landslide reelection victory and was sworn in for his second term on January 26, 1965.

== Primaries ==
=== Republican ===
Republican primary results
Party	Candidate	Votes	%
Republican	Jack Crichton	128,146	100.00%
Total votes		128,146	100.00%

=== Democratic ===
Democratic primary results
Party	Candidate	Votes	%
Democratic	John Connally (incumbent)	1,125,884	69.06%
Democratic	Don Yarborough	471,411	28.92%
Democratic	M. T. Banks	22,047	1.35%
Democratic	Johnnie Mae Hackworthe	10,955	0.67%
Total votes		1,630,297	100.00%

== Results ==
General election results
Party	Candidate	Votes	%	±%
Democratic	John Connally (incumbent)	1,877,793	73.79%	▲19.81
Republican	Jack Crichton	661,675	26.00%	▼19.57
Constitution	John C. Williams	5,257	0.32%	▼0.13
Write-ins	Write-ins	28	0.00%	
Total votes		2,544,753	100.00%	
Democratic hold				

=== Results by county ===
County	John Connally Democratic		Jack Crichton Republican		John C. Williams Constitution Party		Margin		Total votes cast
County	#	%	#	%	#	%	#	%	Total votes cast
Anderson	6,095	75.16%	2,007	24.75%	7	0.09%	4,088	50.41%	8,109
Andrews	2,642	74.53%	894	25.22%	9	0.25%	1,748	49.31%	3,545
Angelina	10,910	82.80%	2,235	16.96%	31	0.24%	8,675	65.84%	13,176
Aransas	1,627	78.94%	429	20.82%	5	0.24%	1,198	58.13%	2,061
Archer	1,874	85.41%	317	14.45%	3	0.14%	1,557	70.97%	2,194
Armstrong	667	75.71%	213	24.18%	1	0.11%	454	51.53%	881
Atascosa	3,628	81.35%	828	18.57%	4	0.09%	2,800	62.78%	4,460
Austin	2,751	70.79%	1,135	29.21%	0	0.00%	1,616	41.59%	3,886
Bailey	1,897	75.34%	619	24.58%	2	0.08%	1,278	50.75%	2,518
Bandera	1,095	67.26%	529	32.49%	4	0.25%	566	34.77%	1,628
Bastrop	4,247	85.54%	718	14.46%	0	0.00%	3,529	71.08%	4,965
Baylor	1,539	86.17%	247	13.83%	0	0.00%	1,292	72.34%	1,786
Bee	3,694	76.29%	1,142	23.59%	6	0.12%	2,552	52.71%	4,842
Bell	15,472	89.31%	1,833	10.58%	18	0.10%	13,639	78.73%	17,323
Bexar	110,427	72.28%	41,891	27.42%	459	0.30%	68,536	44.86%	152,777
Blanco	1,216	82.05%	264	17.81%	2	0.13%	952	64.24%	1,482
Borden	318	77.56%	92	22.44%	0	0.00%	226	55.12%	410
Bosque	3,027	81.55%	681	18.35%	4	0.11%	2,346	63.20%	3,712
Bowie	12,314	72.02%	4,756	27.82%	28	0.16%	7,558	44.20%	17,098
Brazoria	17,618	74.82%	5,846	24.83%	84	0.36%	11,772	49.99%	23,548
Brazos	9,395	80.54%	2,259	19.37%	11	0.09%	7,136	61.17%	11,665
Brewster	1,505	80.74%	357	19.15%	2	0.11%	1,148	61.59%	1,864
Briscoe	1,125	86.21%	177	13.56%	3	0.23%	948	72.64%	1,305
Brooks	2,454	89.56%	281	10.26%	5	0.18%	2,173	79.31%	2,740
Brown	5,980	82.72%	1,239	17.14%	10	0.14%	4,741	65.58%	7,229
Burleson	2,720	87.63%	380	12.24%	4	0.13%	2,340	75.39%	3,104
Burnet	2,794	83.20%	561	16.71%	3	0.09%	2,233	66.50%	3,358
Caldwell	3,850	84.28%	711	15.56%	7	0.15%	3,139	68.72%	4,568
Calhoun	3,689	86.49%	566	13.27%	10	0.23%	3,123	73.22%	4,265
Callahan	2,364	79.28%	616	20.66%	2	0.07%	1,748	58.62%	2,982
Cameron	17,032	68.12%	7,897	31.59%	73	0.29%	9,135	36.54%	25,002
Camp	2,042	80.43%	488	19.22%	9	0.35%	1,554	61.21%	2,539
Carson	1,847	70.71%	763	29.21%	2	0.08%	1,084	41.50%	2,612
Cass	4,287	70.73%	1,769	29.19%	5	0.08%	2,518	41.54%	6,061
Castro	2,081	85.29%	355	14.55%	4	0.16%	1,726	70.74%	2,440
Chambers	2,233	76.89%	662	22.80%	9	0.31%	1,571	54.10%	2,904
Cherokee	6,566	78.06%	1,821	21.65%	24	0.29%	4,745	56.41%	8,411
Childress	2,343	81.16%	542	18.77%	2	0.07%	1,801	62.38%	2,887
Clay	2,534	85.26%	438	14.74%	0	0.00%	2,096	70.52%	2,972
Cochran	1,466	83.39%	292	16.61%	0	0.00%	1,174	66.78%	1,758
Coke	997	80.14%	246	19.77%	1	0.08%	751	60.37%	1,244
Coleman	3,038	74.75%	1,024	25.20%	2	0.05%	2,014	49.56%	4,064
Collin	8,768	81.71%	1,949	18.16%	14	0.13%	6,819	63.54%	10,731
Collingsworth	1,365	73.23%	496	26.61%	3	0.16%	869	46.62%	1,864
Colorado	4,232	76.61%	1,284	23.24%	8	0.14%	2,948	53.37%	5,524
Comal	4,284	73.81%	1,514	26.09%	6	0.10%	2,770	47.73%	5,804
Comanche	3,150	82.81%	648	17.03%	6	0.16%	2,502	65.77%	3,804
Concho	1,158	86.74%	175	13.11%	2	0.15%	983	73.63%	1,335
Cooke	5,163	73.47%	1,859	26.46%	5	0.07%	3,304	47.02%	7,027
Coryell	3,940	87.91%	539	12.03%	3	0.07%	3,401	75.88%	4,482
Cottle	1,213	90.32%	129	9.61%	1	0.07%	1,084	80.71%	1,343
Crane	1,145	74.21%	392	25.41%	6	0.39%	753	48.80%	1,543
Crockett	960	81.01%	221	18.65%	4	0.34%	739	62.36%	1,185
Crosby	2,583	90.06%	285	9.94%	0	0.00%	2,298	80.13%	2,868
Culberson	591	75.00%	195	24.75%	2	0.25%	396	50.25%	788
Dallam	1,226	70.38%	515	29.56%	1	0.06%	711	40.82%	1,742
Dallas	191,704	66.70%	95,244	33.10%	454	0.16%	96,460	33.56%	287,402
Dawson	3,777	78.10%	1,055	21.82%	4	0.08%	2,722	56.29%	4,836
Deaf Smith	2,751	71.83%	1,067	27.86%	12	0.31%	1,684	43.97%	3,830
Delta	1,741	90.21%	187	9.69%	2	0.10%	1,554	80.52%	1,930
Denton	10,222	77.88%	2,896	22.06%	7	0.05%	7,326	55.82%	13,125
DeWitt	4,109	75.06%	1,352	24.70%	13	0.24%	2,757	50.37%	5,474
Dickens	1,446	88.17%	194	11.83%	0	0.00%	1,252	76.34%	1,640
Dimmit	1,431	84.13%	269	15.81%	1	0.06%	1,162	68.31%	1,701
Donley	1,339	75.39%	435	24.49%	2	0.11%	904	50.90%	1,776
Duval	4,504	93.46%	310	6.43%	5	0.10%	4,194	87.03%	4,819
Eastland	5,227	78.23%	1,452	21.73%	3	0.04%	3,775	56.50%	6,682
Ector	12,994	60.86%	8,271	38.74%	84	0.39%	4,723	22.12%	21,349
Edwards	456	64.77%	246	34.94%	2	0.28%	210	29.83%	704
Ellis	8,359	84.02%	1,581	15.89%	9	0.09%	6,778	68.13%	9,949
El Paso	35,114	66.72%	17,244	32.77%	271	0.51%	17,870	33.95%	52,629
Erath	4,247	78.31%	1,174	21.65%	2	0.04%	3,073	56.67%	5,423
Falls	4,283	84.66%	773	15.28%	3	0.06%	3,510	69.38%	5,059
Fannin	6,283	87.90%	862	12.06%	3	0.04%	5,421	75.84%	7,148
Fayette	4,393	77.23%	1,289	22.66%	6	0.11%	3,104	54.57%	5,688
Fisher	2,269	88.95%	276	10.82%	6	0.24%	1,993	78.13%	2,551
Floyd	2,820	79.04%	745	20.88%	3	0.08%	2,075	58.16%	3,568
Foard	870	89.41%	103	10.59%	0	0.00%	767	78.83%	973
Fort Bend	7,533	78.23%	2,074	21.54%	22	0.23%	5,459	56.69%	9,629
Franklin	1,682	87.11%	247	12.79%	2	0.10%	1,435	74.31%	1,931
Freestone	3,239	83.37%	644	16.58%	2	0.05%	2,595	66.80%	3,885
Frio	1,699	79.69%	431	20.22%	2	0.09%	1,268	59.47%	2,132
Gaines	2,458	77.91%	695	22.03%	2	0.06%	1,763	55.88%	3,155
Galveston	32,060	78.14%	8,842	21.55%	128	0.31%	23,218	56.59%	41,030
Garza	1,472	81.91%	320	17.81%	5	0.28%	1,152	64.11%	1,797
Gillespie	2,407	60.83%	1,547	39.10%	3	0.08%	860	21.73%	3,957
Glasscock	247	66.40%	125	33.60%	0	0.00%	122	32.80%	372
Goliad	1,150	75.16%	375	24.51%	5	0.33%	775	50.65%	1,530
Gonzales	3,850	84.47%	702	15.40%	6	0.13%	3,148	69.07%	4,558
Gray	5,010	55.22%	4,057	44.72%	5	0.06%	953	10.50%	9,072
Grayson	15,834	82.65%	3,312	17.29%	12	0.06%	12,522	65.36%	19,158
Gregg	11,097	57.13%	8,230	42.37%	97	0.50%	2,867	14.76%	19,424
Grimes	2,661	84.29%	491	15.55%	5	0.16%	2,170	68.74%	3,157
Guadalupe	5,394	75.15%	1,777	24.76%	7	0.10%	3,617	50.39%	7,178
Hale	7,206	76.34%	2,220	23.52%	13	0.14%	4,986	52.82%	9,439
Hall	2,022	84.21%	378	15.74%	1	0.04%	1,644	68.47%	2,401
Hamilton	2,313	76.14%	723	23.80%	2	0.07%	1,590	52.34%	3,038
Hansford	1,270	62.07%	774	37.83%	2	0.10%	496	24.24%	2,046
Hardeman	2,041	80.90%	482	19.10%	0	0.00%	1,559	61.79%	2,523
Hardin	5,847	82.21%	1,251	17.59%	14	0.20%	4,596	64.62%	7,112
Harris	253,992	68.83%	114,072	30.91%	931	0.25%	139,920	37.92%	368,995
Harrison	7,802	65.56%	4,080	34.28%	19	0.16%	3,722	31.27%	11,901
Hartley	690	69.84%	294	29.76%	4	0.40%	396	40.08%	988
Haskell	3,118	90.75%	315	9.17%	3	0.09%	2,803	81.58%	3,436
Hays	4,113	82.16%	886	17.70%	7	0.14%	3,227	64.46%	5,006
Hemphill	820	69.32%	362	30.60%	1	0.08%	458	38.72%	1,183
Henderson	5,488	83.04%	1,106	16.73%	15	0.23%	4,382	66.30%	6,609
Hidalgo	23,490	73.36%	8,462	26.43%	68	0.21%	15,028	46.93%	32,020
Hill	5,762	86.49%	894	13.42%	6	0.09%	4,868	73.07%	6,662
Hockley	4,751	83.75%	918	16.18%	4	0.07%	3,833	67.57%	5,673
Hood	1,660	85.00%	289	14.80%	4	0.20%	1,371	70.20%	1,953
Hopkins	4,707	84.84%	834	15.03%	7	0.13%	3,873	69.81%	5,548
Houston	4,201	80.62%	1,002	19.23%	8	0.15%	3,199	61.39%	5,211
Howard	7,243	78.36%	1,994	21.57%	6	0.06%	5,249	56.79%	9,243
Hudspeth	502	77.47%	140	21.60%	6	0.93%	362	55.86%	648
Hunt	7,706	79.08%	2,032	20.85%	7	0.07%	5,674	58.22%	9,745
Hutchinson	6,078	62.08%	3,698	37.77%	14	0.14%	2,380	24.31%	9,790
Irion	406	75.32%	133	24.68%	0	0.00%	273	50.65%	539
Jack	1,790	73.66%	635	26.13%	5	0.21%	1,155	47.53%	2,430
Jackson	3,218	81.59%	719	18.23%	7	0.18%	2,499	63.36%	3,944
Jasper	4,330	78.97%	1,134	20.68%	19	0.35%	3,196	58.29%	5,483
Jeff Davis	347	73.52%	124	26.27%	1	0.21%	223	47.25%	472
Jefferson	51,599	72.68%	19,020	26.79%	379	0.53%	32,579	45.89%	70,998
Jim Hogg	1,419	92.93%	106	6.94%	2	0.13%	1,313	85.99%	1,527
Jim Wells	7,216	82.18%	1,563	17.80%	2	0.02%	5,653	64.38%	8,781
Johnson	7,261	77.22%	2,135	22.71%	7	0.07%	5,126	54.51%	9,403
Jones	4,088	83.87%	783	16.06%	3	0.06%	3,305	67.81%	4,874
Karnes	3,576	85.98%	583	14.02%	0	0.00%	2,993	71.96%	4,159
Kaufman	5,572	83.56%	1,089	16.33%	7	0.10%	4,483	67.23%	6,668
Kendall	1,143	53.92%	972	45.85%	5	0.24%	171	8.07%	2,120
Kenedy	138	91.39%	13	8.61%	0	0.00%	125	82.78%	151
Kent	600	89.29%	72	10.71%	0	0.00%	528	78.57%	672
Kerr	3,402	61.74%	2,105	38.20%	3	0.05%	1,297	23.54%	5,510
Kimble	1,032	75.44%	336	24.56%	0	0.00%	696	50.88%	1,368
King	197	91.20%	19	8.80%	0	0.00%	178	82.41%	216
Kinney	488	82.57%	103	17.43%	0	0.00%	385	65.14%	591
Kleberg	5,053	82.15%	1,093	17.77%	5	0.08%	3,960	64.38%	6,151
Knox	1,917	86.70%	292	13.21%	2	0.09%	1,625	73.50%	2,211
Lamar	7,369	84.38%	1,353	15.49%	11	0.13%	6,016	68.89%	8,733
Lamb	5,060	80.65%	1,209	19.27%	5	0.08%	3,851	61.38%	6,274
Lampasas	2,349	84.41%	431	15.49%	3	0.11%	1,918	68.92%	2,783
La Salle	1,071	90.08%	116	9.76%	2	0.17%	955	80.32%	1,189
Lavaca	4,487	81.46%	1,015	18.43%	6	0.11%	3,472	63.04%	5,508
Lee	2,129	77.11%	631	22.85%	1	0.04%	1,498	54.26%	2,761
Leon	2,571	87.51%	364	12.39%	3	0.10%	2,207	75.12%	2,938
Liberty	5,990	74.55%	2,026	25.21%	19	0.24%	3,964	49.33%	8,035
Limestone	4,247	82.40%	902	17.50%	5	0.10%	3,345	64.90%	5,154
Lipscomb	798	59.46%	541	40.31%	3	0.22%	257	19.15%	1,342
Live Oak	1,660	74.64%	558	25.09%	6	0.27%	1,102	49.55%	2,224
Llano	1,863	72.94%	689	26.98%	2	0.08%	1,174	45.97%	2,554
Loving	53	67.95%	25	32.05%	0	0.00%	28	35.90%	78
Lubbock	28,877	74.74%	9,733	25.19%	27	0.07%	19,144	49.55%	38,637
Lynn	2,663	88.50%	343	11.40%	3	0.10%	2,320	77.10%	3,009
McCulloch	2,272	83.22%	458	16.78%	0	0.00%	1,814	66.45%	2,730
McLennan	32,075	82.58%	6,729	17.32%	37	0.10%	25,346	65.26%	38,841
McMullen	304	68.01%	142	31.77%	1	0.22%	162	36.24%	447
Madison	1,579	82.41%	330	17.22%	7	0.37%	1,249	65.19%	1,916
Marion	1,478	66.46%	744	33.45%	2	0.09%	734	33.00%	2,224
Martin	1,026	79.41%	266	20.59%	0	0.00%	760	58.82%	1,292
Mason	1,029	67.61%	492	32.33%	1	0.07%	537	35.28%	1,522
Matagorda	5,084	77.45%	1,467	22.35%	13	0.20%	3,617	55.10%	6,564
Maverick	2,309	87.13%	334	12.60%	7	0.26%	1,975	74.53%	2,650
Medina	3,865	77.91%	1,093	22.03%	3	0.06%	2,772	55.88%	4,961
Menard	718	72.89%	266	27.01%	1	0.10%	452	45.89%	985
Midland	11,030	55.10%	8,934	44.63%	55	0.27%	2,096	10.47%	20,019
Milam	4,817	84.78%	854	15.03%	11	0.19%	3,963	69.75%	5,682
Mills	1,367	80.04%	336	19.67%	5	0.29%	1,031	60.36%	1,708
Mitchell	2,666	85.59%	447	14.35%	2	0.06%	2,219	71.24%	3,115
Montague	3,965	83.56%	774	16.31%	6	0.13%	3,191	67.25%	4,745
Montgomery	5,941	74.55%	2,002	25.12%	26	0.33%	3,939	49.43%	7,969
Moore	2,916	70.86%	1,188	28.87%	11	0.27%	1,728	41.99%	4,115
Morris	2,799	78.78%	741	20.86%	13	0.37%	2,058	57.92%	3,553
Motley	801	80.58%	191	19.22%	2	0.20%	610	61.37%	994
Nacogdoches	5,676	79.38%	1,459	20.41%	15	0.21%	4,217	58.98%	7,150
Navarro	7,359	83.59%	1,444	16.40%	1	0.01%	5,915	67.19%	8,804
Newton	2,439	84.37%	445	15.39%	7	0.24%	1,994	68.97%	2,891
Nolan	4,581	80.75%	1,084	19.11%	8	0.14%	3,497	61.64%	5,673
Nueces	41,375	79.45%	10,596	20.35%	104	0.20%	30,779	59.11%	52,075
Ochiltree	1,569	58.03%	1,132	41.86%	3	0.11%	437	16.16%	2,704
Oldham	507	76.70%	151	22.84%	3	0.45%	356	53.86%	661
Orange	11,121	72.39%	4,208	27.39%	34	0.22%	6,913	45.00%	15,363
Palo Pinto	4,307	78.15%	1,200	21.77%	4	0.07%	3,107	56.38%	5,511
Panola	3,390	63.94%	1,899	35.82%	13	0.25%	1,491	28.12%	5,302
Parker	5,853	79.06%	1,546	20.88%	4	0.05%	4,307	58.18%	7,403
Parmer	2,003	72.97%	734	26.74%	8	0.29%	1,269	46.23%	2,745
Pecos	2,532	73.16%	923	26.67%	6	0.17%	1,609	46.49%	3,461
Polk	2,880	82.31%	612	17.49%	7	0.20%	2,268	64.82%	3,499
Potter	16,134	68.05%	7,465	31.49%	109	0.46%	8,669	36.57%	23,708
Presidio	1,303	82.63%	273	17.31%	1	0.06%	1,030	65.31%	1,577
Rains	961	83.93%	183	15.98%	1	0.09%	778	67.95%	1,145
Randall	8,247	61.78%	5,067	37.96%	36	0.27%	3,180	23.82%	13,350
Reagan	777	77.54%	224	22.36%	1	0.10%	553	55.19%	1,002
Real	544	73.22%	198	26.65%	1	0.13%	346	46.57%	743
Red River	3,967	86.65%	607	13.26%	4	0.09%	3,360	73.39%	4,578
Reeves	2,791	79.02%	729	20.64%	12	0.34%	2,062	58.38%	3,532
Refugio	2,543	82.35%	543	17.58%	2	0.06%	2,000	64.77%	3,088
Roberts	285	58.28%	204	41.72%	0	0.00%	81	16.56%	489
Robertson	3,594	87.55%	509	12.40%	2	0.05%	3,085	75.15%	4,105
Rockwall	1,464	85.66%	243	14.22%	2	0.12%	1,221	71.45%	1,709
Runnels	3,096	76.46%	949	23.44%	4	0.10%	2,147	53.03%	4,049
Rusk	7,633	67.32%	3,674	32.40%	31	0.27%	3,959	34.92%	11,338
Sabine	1,885	84.76%	337	15.15%	2	0.09%	1,548	69.60%	2,224
San Augustine	1,313	69.80%	558	29.67%	10	0.53%	755	40.14%	1,881
San Jacinto	1,762	88.72%	223	11.23%	1	0.05%	1,539	77.49%	1,986
San Patricio	7,684	82.65%	1,602	17.23%	11	0.12%	6,082	65.42%	9,297
San Saba	2,012	89.03%	248	10.97%	0	0.00%	1,764	78.05%	2,260
Schleicher	639	71.56%	254	28.44%	0	0.00%	385	43.11%	893
Scurry	3,975	78.73%	1,070	21.19%	4	0.08%	2,905	57.54%	5,049
Shackelford	1,071	75.74%	342	24.19%	1	0.07%	729	51.56%	1,414
Shelby	4,016	71.00%	1,632	28.85%	8	0.14%	2,384	42.15%	5,656
Sherman	704	65.86%	364	34.05%	1	0.09%	340	31.81%	1,069
Smith	16,326	65.73%	8,445	34.00%	68	0.27%	7,881	31.73%	24,839
Somervell	695	82.64%	144	17.12%	2	0.24%	551	65.52%	841
Starr	3,970	85.14%	679	14.56%	14	0.30%	3,291	70.58%	4,663
Stephens	2,060	72.61%	776	27.35%	1	0.04%	1,284	45.26%	2,837
Sterling	299	78.68%	81	21.32%	0	0.00%	218	57.37%	380
Stonewall	1,062	88.06%	141	11.69%	3	0.25%	921	76.37%	1,206
Sutton	812	77.93%	227	21.79%	3	0.29%	585	56.14%	1,042
Swisher	2,759	86.49%	425	13.32%	6	0.19%	2,334	73.17%	3,190
Tarrant	106,790	71.87%	41,425	27.88%	371	0.25%	65,365	43.99%	148,586
Taylor	15,844	73.08%	5,809	26.79%	28	0.13%	10,035	46.28%	21,681
Terrell	444	67.89%	210	32.11%	0	0.00%	234	35.78%	654
Terry	3,741	81.77%	829	18.12%	5	0.11%	2,912	63.65%	4,575
Throckmorton	939	84.06%	178	15.94%	0	0.00%	761	68.13%	1,117
Titus	4,044	78.74%	1,086	21.14%	6	0.12%	2,958	57.59%	5,136
Tom Green	11,649	72.91%	4,302	26.93%	26	0.16%	7,347	45.98%	15,977
Travis	50,989	81.04%	11,842	18.82%	91	0.14%	39,147	62.22%	62,922
Trinity	1,873	78.93%	490	20.65%	10	0.42%	1,383	58.28%	2,373
Tyler	2,159	73.41%	773	26.28%	9	0.31%	1,386	47.13%	2,941
Upshur	4,650	75.16%	1,531	24.75%	6	0.10%	3,119	50.41%	6,187
Upton	1,215	75.65%	383	23.85%	8	0.50%	832	51.81%	1,606
Uvalde	2,961	68.96%	1,328	30.93%	5	0.12%	1,633	38.03%	4,294
Val Verde	3,936	80.92%	926	19.04%	2	0.04%	3,010	61.88%	4,864
Van Zandt	4,563	81.38%	1,038	18.51%	6	0.11%	3,525	62.87%	5,607
Victoria	9,368	77.18%	2,746	22.62%	24	0.20%	6,622	54.56%	12,138
Walker	3,577	79.61%	912	20.30%	4	0.09%	2,665	59.31%	4,493
Waller	2,458	80.25%	599	19.56%	6	0.20%	1,859	60.69%	3,063
Ward	2,663	68.26%	1,234	31.63%	4	0.10%	1,429	36.63%	3,901
Washington	3,671	76.04%	1,157	23.96%	0	0.00%	2,514	52.07%	4,828
Webb	9,854	92.94%	742	7.00%	6	0.06%	9,112	85.95%	10,602
Wharton	7,030	79.15%	1,843	20.75%	9	0.10%	5,187	58.40%	8,882
Wheeler	1,705	68.20%	792	31.68%	3	0.12%	913	36.52%	2,500
Wichita	21,558	78.44%	5,910	21.50%	16	0.06%	15,648	56.93%	27,484
Wilbarger	3,717	78.85%	992	21.04%	5	0.11%	2,725	57.81%	4,714
Willacy	2,590	76.63%	783	23.17%	7	0.21%	1,807	53.46%	3,380
Williamson	8,052	88.23%	1,064	11.66%	10	0.11%	6,988	76.57%	9,126
Wilson	3,786	89.00%	466	10.95%	2	0.05%	3,320	78.04%	4,254
Winkler	2,536	70.15%	1,074	29.71%	5	0.14%	1,462	40.44%	3,615
Wise	4,313	82.96%	880	16.93%	6	0.12%	3,433	66.03%	5,199
Wood	4,266	76.44%	1,301	23.31%	14	0.25%	2,965	53.13%	5,581
Yoakum	1,776	79.11%	467	20.80%	2	0.09%	1,309	58.31%	2,245
Young	3,802	76.99%	1,135	22.99%	1	0.02%	2,667	54.01%	4,938
Zapata	1,073	92.34%	88	7.57%	1	0.09%	985	84.77%	1,162
Zavala	2,074	87.11%	307	12.89%	0	0.00%	1,767	74.21%	2,381
Totals	1,877,793	73.79%	661,675	26.00%	5,257	0.21%	1,216,118	47.79%	2,544,753

==== Counties that flipped from Republican to Democratic ====
- Bailey
- Bandera
- Comal
- Cooke
- Crockett
- Culberson
- Dallas
- Deaf Smith
- DeWitt
- Ector
- Edwards
- Gillespie
- Glasscock
- Gray
- Gregg
- Guadalupe
- Hale
- Hamilton
- Hansford
- Harris
- Harrison
- Hemphill
- Hutchinson
- Kendall
- Kerr
- Kimble
- Lipscomb
- Loving
- Lubbock
- Mason
- McMullen
- Menard
- Midland
- Moore
- Ochiltree
- Panola
- Parmer
- Potter
- Randall
- Real
- Roberts
- Runnels
- Rusk
- Schleicher
- Sherman
- Smith
- Stephens
- Sterling
- Taylor
- Terrell
- Tom Green
- Upton
- Uvalde
- Ward
- Winkler
