= Stephens County Courthouse =

Stephens County Courthouse may refer to:

- Stephens County Courthouse (Georgia), Toccoa, Georgia
- Stephens County Courthouse (Texas), Breckenridge, Texas, listed on the National Register of Historic Places
