= John Connally =

American politician (1917–1993)

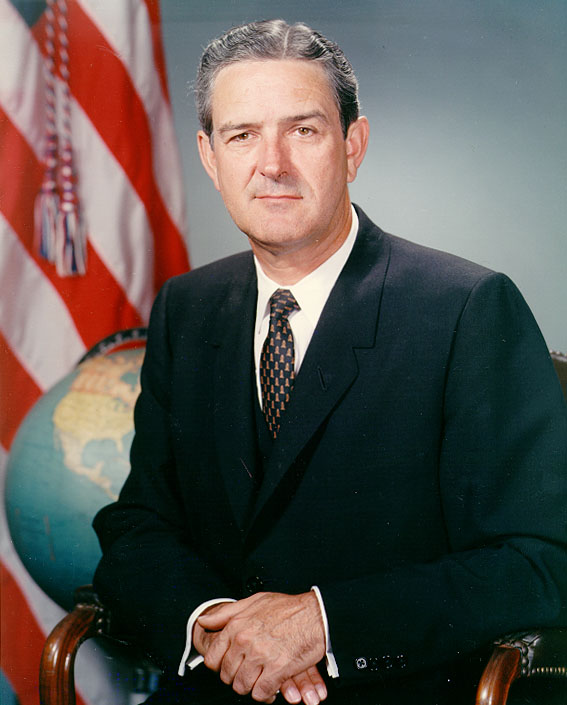
- Connally in 1961

61st United States Secretary of the Treasury
- In office February 11, 1971 – June 12, 1972
- President: Richard Nixon
- Preceded by: David M. Kennedy
- Succeeded by: George Shultz

39th Governor of Texas
- In office January 15, 1963 – January 21, 1969
- Lieutenant: Preston Smith
- Preceded by: Price Daniel
- Succeeded by: Preston Smith

56th United States Secretary of the Navy
- In office January 25, 1961 – December 20, 1961
- President: John F. Kennedy
- Preceded by: William B. Franke
- Succeeded by: Fred Korth

Personal details
- Born: John Bowden Connally Jr. February 27, 1917 Floresville, Texas, U.S.
- Died: June 15, 1993 (aged 76) Houston, Texas, U.S.
- Resting place: Texas State Cemetery
- Party: Republican (after 1973)
- Other political affiliations: Democratic (until 1973)
- Spouse: Nellie Brill (m. 1940)
- Children: 4
- Relatives: Wayne Connally (brother)
- Education: University of Texas at Austin (BA, LLB)

Military service
- Allegiance: United States
- Branch/service: United States Navy
- Years of service: 1941–1946
- Rank: Lieutenant Commander
- Battles/wars: World War II

John Bowden Connally Jr. (February 27, 1917 – June 15, 1993) was an American politician who served as the 39th governor of Texas from 1963 to 1969 and as the 61st United States secretary of the treasury from 1971 to 1972. He began his career as a Democrat and became a Republican in 1973.

Connally was born in Floresville, Texas, in 1917 and pursued a legal career after graduating from the University of Texas at Austin. During World War II, he served on the staff of James Forrestal and Dwight D. Eisenhower before transferring to the Asiatic-Pacific Theater. After the war, he became an aide to Senator Lyndon B. Johnson. When Johnson assumed the vice presidency in 1961, he convinced President John F. Kennedy to appoint Connally to the position of United States Secretary of the Navy. Connally left the Kennedy Administration in December 1961 to successfully run for Governor of Texas. In 1963, Connally was riding in the presidential limousine when Kennedy was assassinated, and was seriously wounded. During his governorship, he was a conservative Democrat.

In 1971, Republican President Richard Nixon appointed Connally as his treasury secretary. In this position, Connally presided over the removal of the United States dollar from the gold standard, an event known as the Nixon shock. Connally stepped down from the Cabinet in 1972 to lead the Democrats for Nixon organization, which campaigned for Nixon's re-election. Connally was on Nixon's short list to replace Vice President Spiro Agnew after the latter resigned in 1973, but Gerald Ford was chosen instead. Connally sought the Republican nomination for president in the 1980 election, but withdrew from the race after the first set of primaries. Connally did not seek public office again after 1980 and died of pulmonary fibrosis in 1993.

== Early life and education ==
Connally was born on February 27, 1917, into a large family in Floresville, the seat of Wilson County, southeast of San Antonio. He was the third of seven children born to Lela (née Wright) and John Bowden Connally, a dairy and tenant farmer. His six siblings included four brothers: Golfrey, Merrill, Wayne and Stanford, and sisters Carmen and Blanche. According to Ronnie Dugger, Connally's parents at the time of their marriage in 1908 had no money, no home, and no furniture. His parents grew even poorer because of the Great Depression, and when speaking about his poverty, Connally often recalled that he had to study by kerosene light.

Despite the initial hardship, John Bowden Connally was able to lift the family out of poverty by running a successful bus route, and by 1932 the family bought a 1000-acre farm. The income from the farm was enough to cover Connally's tuition. Connally attended Floresville High School and was one of the few graduates who attended college. He graduated from the University of Texas at Austin, where he was the student body president and a member of the Friar Society. It was at the University of Texas that he met his future wife Nellie Connally. He subsequently graduated from the University of Texas School of Law and was admitted to the bar by examination.

In 1936, Connally met and befriended Lyndon B. Johnson, of whom he remained a political ally and friend for Johnson's entire life. Johnson helped Connally get a job in the campus library, and Connally played a minor role in Johnson's bid for Congress in 1937. Johnson rewarded Connally for his help by taking him to Washington in 1939, where Connally remained until 1941, when he joined the Naval Reserve.

== Military service and legal career ==
Connally served in the United States Navy, starting on June 11, 1941, as an ensign during World War II, first as an aide to James V. Forrestal. Subsequently, he was on General Dwight D. Eisenhower's staff for planning the North African campaign. After transferring to the South Pacific Theater, he served as fighter-plane director aboard the aircraft carrier USS Essex and was awarded the Bronze Star for bravery. After being transferred to the USS Bennington, he was awarded the Legion of Merit. He was discharged in January 1946 at the rank of lieutenant commander.

Connally practiced law in the Alvin Wirtz law firm, until Lyndon Baines Johnson, then a newly elected senator, persuaded him to return to Washington, to serve as a key aide. He had close ties with Johnson before his navy days and maintained them until the former president's death in 1973.

Two of Connally's principal legal clients were the Texas oil tycoon Sid W. Richardson and Perry Bass, Richardson's nephew and partner, both of Fort Worth. Richardson's empire in the 1950s was estimated at $200 million to $1 billion. Under Richardson's tutelage, Connally gained experience in a variety of enterprises and received tips on real estate purchases. The work required the Connallys to relocate to Fort Worth. When Richardson died in 1959, Connally was named to the lucrative position of co-executor of the estate.

Connally was also involved in a reported clandestine deal to place the Texas Democrat Robert Anderson on the 1956 Republican ticket as vice president. Although the idea fell through when Dwight Eisenhower retained Richard Nixon in the second slot, Anderson received a million dollars for his efforts and a subsequent appointment as U.S. Treasury Secretary.

== From Navy secretary to Texas politics ==
Following the end of World War II, Connally worked in Johnson's radio station KTBC in Austin, Texas, before borrowing $25,000 in 1946 to found a new radio station KVET. He was the president of the radio station between 1946 and 1949. Connally became a chief strategist for Lyndon Johnson's 1948 Senate race, and is reported to have said: "I really ran the campaign that year." Connally almost ended up running for office instead of Johnson because of the latter's reluctance, but Johnson eventually did settle on partaking in the election.

At the 1960 Democratic convention in Los Angeles, Connally led supporters of Senator Lyndon Johnson. His argument that John F. Kennedy would be an unsuitable president due to having Addison's disease and a dependence on cortisone was fruitless, as Kennedy had already secured the needed delegates for nomination before the convention even opened. Kennedy made Johnson his running mate in order to secure the support of Southern Democrats, and went on to win the 1960 presidential election.

=== Secretary of the Navy ===
At Johnson's request, in 1961 President Kennedy named Connally Secretary of the Navy. Connally resigned eleven months later to run for the Texas governorship. During Connally's secretaryship, the Navy had a budget of $14 billion and more than 1.2 million workers–600,000 in uniform and 650,000 civilian–stationed at 222 bases in the United States and 53 abroad.

Connally directed the Sixth Fleet in the Mediterranean Sea on a new kind of "gunboat diplomacy." The USS Forrestal landed in Naples, Italy, and brought gifts to children in an orphanage. Connally also ordered gifts for a hospital in Cannes, France, that treated children with bone diseases, for poor Greek children on the island of Rhodes and for disabled children in Palermo, Italy. Presents were also sent to Turkish children in Cyprus and to a camp in Beirut for homeless Palestinian refugees. The Bay of Pigs incident occurred under his watch.

Connally fought hard to protect the Navy's role in the national space program, having vigorously opposed assigning most space research to the Air Force. Time termed Connally's year as Navy Secretary "a first-rate appointment." Critics noted, however, that the brevity of Connally's tenure precluded any sustained or comprehensive achievements.

=== Running for governor ===
Connally announced in December 1961 that he was leaving the position of Secretary of the Navy to seek the Democratic nomination for the 1962 Texas gubernatorial election. He would have to compete against the incumbent Marion Price Daniel Sr., who was running for a fourth consecutive two-year term. Daniel was in political trouble following the enactment of a two-cent state sales tax in 1961, which had soured many voters on his administration. Another opponent, Don Yarborough, was a liberal attorney from Houston favored by organized labor. Former state Attorney General Will Wilson also entered the campaign, criticizing Johnson, who he claimed had engineered Connally's candidacy.

Connally ran as a conservative Democrat. Connally waged the most active campaign of any of the Democrats, traveling more than 22,000 miles across the state. He made 43 major speeches and appeared on multiple statewide and local telecasts. Biographer Charles Ashman called Connally a "total professional" when it came to campaigning. During the campaign, Connally courted crowds and travelled with aides to make for a more noticeable entrance when he arrived at events. Ashman claimed that Connally would have aides telephone airports ask to page him for an urgent message, in order to give the impression that he was much in demand.

According to a 1961 poll, only 1% of Texas voters were willing to back Connally, which forced him to make ground rapidly. Connally appeared conservative, but did often highlight his position in the Kennedy Administration in attempt to appeal to Hispanic and Afro-American voters. Connally refused to debate Yarborough, and resorted to attacking him in subtle ways instead, attacking him as a candidate of Americans for Democratic Action, which "was like equating him with the Communist party" in a Southern state like Texas.

Eventually he was placed in a primary runoff election against Yarborough, which he won by a close vote. Connally's Republican opponent for the governor's office was conservative Republican Jack Cox, also of Houston. Connally received 847,038 ballots (54%) to Cox's 715,025 (45.6%). In the campaign, Connally made an issue of Cox having switched to the Republican party the previous year; eleven years later, Connally made the same switch.

== Governor of Texas ==
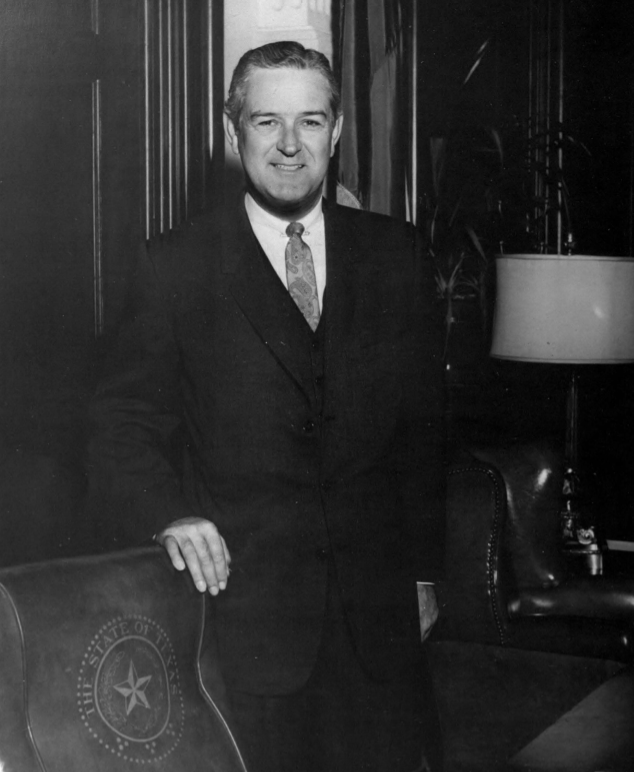
Connally as governor, 1967

Connally served as governor from 1963 until 1969. In the campaigns of 1964 and 1966, Connally defeated weak Republican challenges offered by Jack Crichton, a Dallas oil industrialist, and Thomas Everton Kennerly Sr. (1903–2000), of Houston, respectively. He prevailed with margins of 73.8 percent and 72.8 percent, respectively, giving him greater influence with the nearly all-Democratic legislature.

Connally was governor during a time of great expansion of higher education in Texas. He signed into law the creation of the Texas Higher Education Coordinating Board. He appointed regents who backed the entry of women into previously all-male Texas A&M University in College Station, having been prompted to take such action by State Senator William T. "Bill" Moore of Bryan, who in 1953 had first proposed the admission of women to the institution.

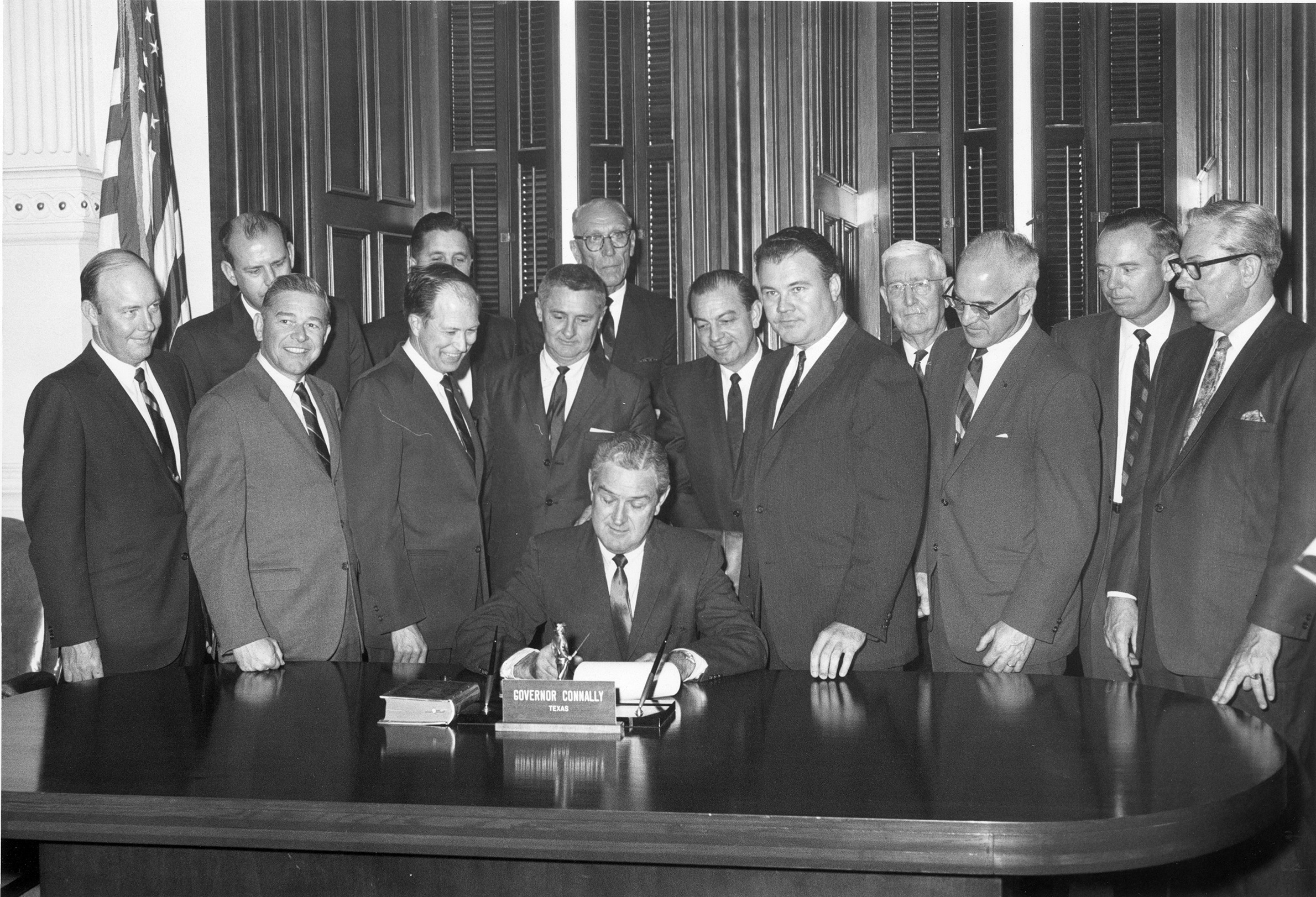
Governor Connally signing the bill that separated Arlington State College from the Texas A&M University System in 1965

Following the Assassination of John F. Kennedy, Connally "became almost a demigod symbol to the voters in Texas which would assure him an overwhelming victory in 1964". The governor became very religious and believed that he had been saved by God for a reason. He wrote: "Now I feel that, rather than being elected, maybe I'm one of God's elect. The good Lord chose to leave me here, so I figure I'm one of God's elect."

Following his re-election in 1964, Connally grew critical of Lyndon Johnson's Great Society and was willing to block its enaction in Texas. Connally was also a bitter opponent of trade unions and strongly supported right-to-work law in Texas, which led the AFL-CIO to call for his resignation. Texas Republicans strongly commended Connally for his conservative views, and a Houston Republican Albert B. Fay said that he wanted "to publicly commend him [Connally] and invite him into the Republican party."

Connally cemented himself as a very conservative Democrat, even by the standards of the Solid South, which led many to believe that he was aligned more towards the Republican Party than his own. During the presidency of Johnson, Connally "spoke out for state vetoes on anti-poverty programs, publicly went on television to oppose the civil rights laws guaranteeing all citizens access to public accommodations, and other Great Society legislation." The liberal wing of the Democratic Party in Texas believed that a break between Connally and the president was imminent, given Connally's support for racial segregation and his opposition to Johnson's welfare policies. The split did not come to fruition and according to The New Republic, Johnson and Connally "agree to disagree".

Despite clashing with Johnson on the issue of segregation and economic policies, Connally agreed with the president's foreign policy, supported escalating the Vietnam War, and kept supporting Johnson even after the Vietnam War grew deeply unpopular. Connally fiercely defended the war, and accused Democratic progressives such as Eugene McCarthy and George McGovern of supporting "appeasement and surrender"; in turn, Pierre Salinger accused Connally of endorsing "old-type Joe McCarthyism". Eugene Nickerson remarked that Connally's view on the Vietnam War was "blood thirsty" and that he expressed support "for bigger and better wars". Connally remained a hardline hawk his entire life, and consistently pressured President Johnson to stay aggressive towards Vietnam.

As governor of Texas, Connally also had a strained relationship with Afro-Americans and Latin Americans, and was reported to have "snubbed a group of Latin Americans in 1966 who walked 350 miles to ask him to support a state minimum wage". This earned Connally a reputation of a reactionary, deeply conservative, and insensitive politician. In 1966, Connally defended his views by saying: "In a sense it is a dirty business, but not corrupt. It's mean... It's tough... [People] will say some mean things about you, but this is one of the burdens you have to bear. People say mean things about me-and they will this year".

Connally founded and thoroughly consolidated his political machine in Texas during his governorship, and said: "Texas is a one-party state, and I'll see to it that it stays that way." According to Robert Sherrill, Connally moved the state in a conservative direction, and "controlled the men who controlled the politics in Texas—all conservative". This allowed the governor to successfully prevent the Civil Rights Act of 1964 and the Voting Rights Act of 1965 from being enforced in the state.

By Spring of 1967, Connally announced that he would not seek a fourth term because of his failing health: he suffered from stomach ulcer. Reevaluating the governorship of John Connally, Rita Lynne Colbert concludes:

His accomplishments as Governor of Texas for six years appear quite modest. Some new industry was attracted to the state, a tourist development agency was set up, a commission appointed to study higher education problems. Texas minorities have spoken out violently against his stand opposing President Johnson's civil rights bill. And in his own party, the liberal Democrats were very angry because Connally had frequently snubbed them. The one area he seemed to excel in was the growth of better education in Texas. Connally said he wanted to be known as "the education Governor," and he will be, because spending for higher education rose 150 percent and for secondary education 100 percent. The expenditures for mental-health rose 300 percent.

Along with the increase in education was the increase of taxes during Connally's term as Governor. The Texas budget rose from $1.3 billion to $2.5 billion a year, almost doubling. Connally argued that increases in service to Texas outweighed the tax rise, and that, per capita, taxes rose only 16.4 percent while the national average rose by 21.9 percent. Even though the taxes rose, the business taxes did not rise nearly as much as per capita income of the people and Connally was not shy about mentioning this to big business, The New York Times tells that Connally admitted (at a meeting in San Antonio in 1966 that was supposed to have been secret), that his administration had gone out of its way to keep taxes off business, although "every poll shows business taxes are the most popular with the public." Yarborough, Connally's long time enemy, calls Connally "the worst, the most reactionary Governor in Texas history."

As governor, Connally promoted HemisFair '68, the world's fair held in San Antonio, which he suggested could net the state an additional $12 million in direct taxes. He also supported turning the fair's Texas Pavilion into a permanent museum, the Institute of Texan Cultures, describing his vision for it as "a dramatic showcase, not only to Texans, but to all the world, of the host of diverse peoples from many lands whose blood and dreams built our state."

There was some talk of Connally being selected as Hubert Humphrey's running mate on the Democratic ticket in 1968, but liberal Senator Edmund Muskie of Maine was chosen instead. Connally publicly endorsed Humphrey, but the relationship was not always smooth. According to then-Representative Ben Barnes, in a private meeting at the 1968 Democratic National Convention, Connally angrily accused Humphrey of being disloyal to President Johnson by trying to soft-pedal Johnson's position regarding Vietnam. Ashman claims that during this time Connally was "privately helping Nixon, recruiting a number of influential Texans, members of both parties, to work for the Republican candidate."

Connally was succeeded as governor by Lieutenant Governor Preston Smith.

=== Kennedy assassination ===
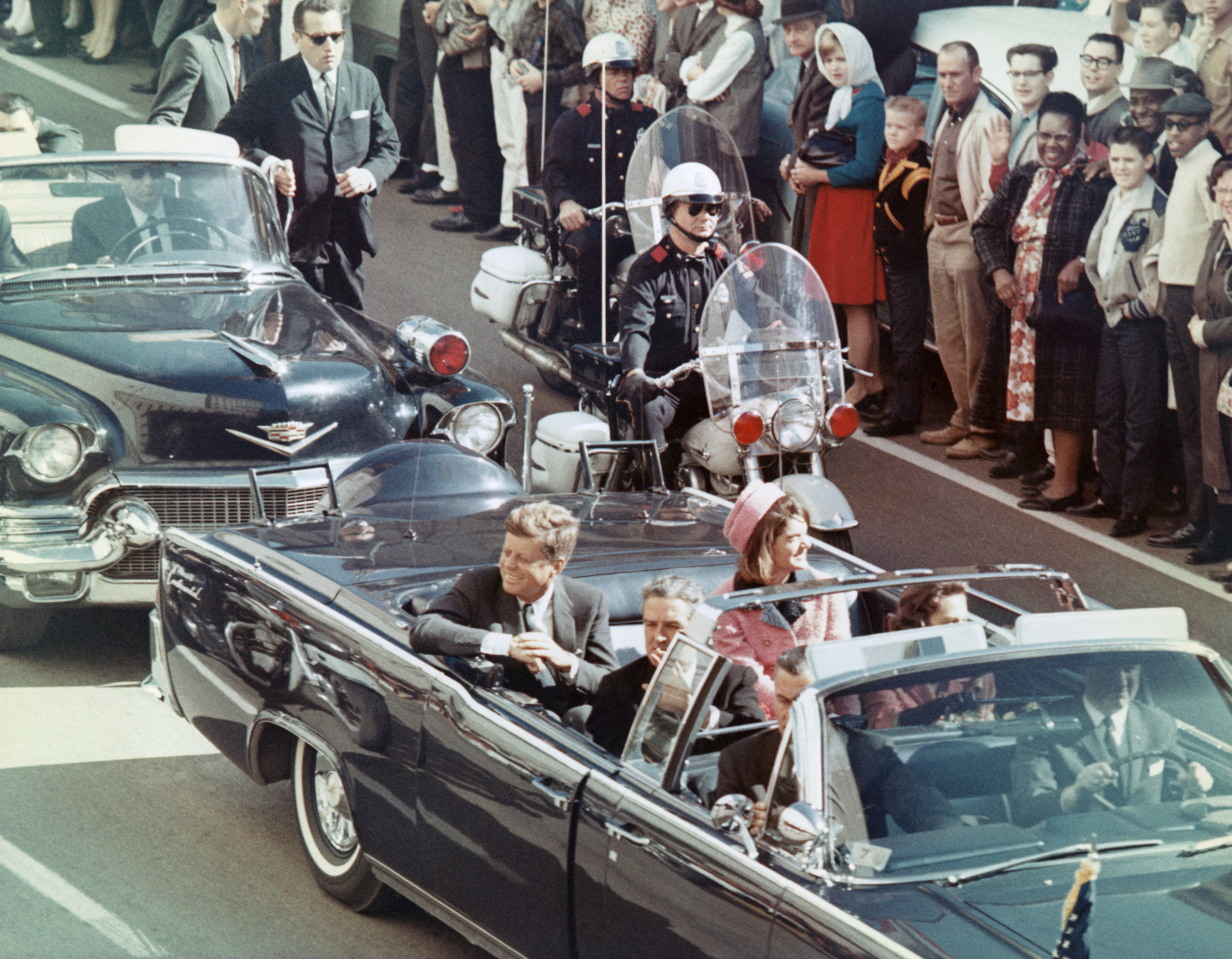
Connally, seated in front of Kennedy, minutes before the assassination

On November 22, 1963, Connally was seriously wounded while riding in Kennedy's presidential limousine at Dealey Plaza, Dallas when Kennedy was assassinated. Riding in the middle jump seat of the limousine in front of Kennedy, Connally recalled hearing the first shot, which he immediately recognized as a rifle shot. Connally stated that he immediately feared an assassination attempt and turned to his right to look back to see Kennedy. Looking over his right shoulder, Connally did not catch Kennedy out of the corner of his eye, so he said he began to turn back to look to his left, when Connally felt a forceful impact to his back and said “ouch”.

Connally later told the Warren Commission: "I said, 'My God, they are going to kill us all.'" He looked down and saw that his chest was covered with blood and thought he had been fatally shot. Then Connally heard the third and final shot, which sprayed blood and brain tissue on the car's passengers. He suffered a fracture of the fifth rib, a punctured lung, a shattered wrist, and had a bullet lodged in his leg. He underwent four hours of surgery after the shooting and recovered from his wounds.

Charles Gregory, the doctor who tended to his wrist wound, told the Warren Commission that the bullet that struck Connally went from the upper (dorsal) surface, near the midline, about 5 cm above his wrist joint, to the under (volar) surface, much closer to the joint, at a distance of about 1.5 cm. The 10-month investigation by the Warren Commission concluded in 1964 that Kennedy was assassinated by 24-year-old ex-Marine Lee Harvey Oswald and that Oswald had acted entirely alone. Connally did not accept the single-bullet theory, which suggested that one shot passed through Kennedy's neck and caused all of Connally's wounds. He insisted that all three shots struck occupants of the limousine. Publicly, he agreed with the Warren Commission's conclusion that Oswald acted alone.

== Secretary of the Treasury ==
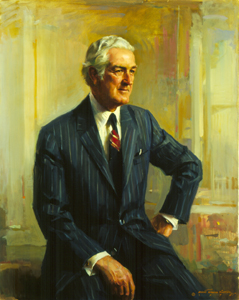
Connally's official Treasury Department portrait

In 1971, Republican President Nixon appointed Democrat Connally as Treasury Secretary. Before agreeing to take the appointment, however, Connally told Nixon that the president must find a position in the administration for George H. W. Bush, the Republican who had been defeated in November 1970 in a hard-fought U.S. Senate race against Democrat Lloyd Bentsen. Connally told Nixon that his taking the Treasury post would embarrass Bush, who had "labored in the vineyards" for Nixon's election as president, while Connally had supported Humphrey.

Nixon named Bush as ambassador to the United Nations in order to secure Connally's services at Treasury. Ben Barnes, then the lieutenant governor and originally a Connally ally, claims in his autobiography that Connally's insistence saved Bush's political career, leading to Bush's eventual presidency and indirectly to the presidency of his son, George W. Bush.

Shortly after taking the Treasury post, Connally famously told a group of European finance ministers worried about the export of American inflation that the dollar "is our currency, but your problem."

Connally's signature, as used on American currency

Secretary Connally defended a $50 billion increase in the debt ceiling and a $35 to $40 billion budget deficit as an essential "fiscal stimulus" at a time when five million Americans were unemployed. He unveiled Nixon's program of raising the price of gold and formally devaluing the dollar, known as the Nixon shock—finally leaving the old gold standard entirely, a departure begun in 1934 by Franklin D. Roosevelt.

Prices continued to increase during 1971, and Nixon allowed wage and price guidelines, which Congress had authorized on a stand-by basis, to be implemented. Connally later shied away from his role in recommending the failed wage and price controls, and announced guaranteed loans for the ailing Lockheed aircraft company. He also fought a lonely battle against growing balance-of-payment problems with the nation's trading partners, and undertook important foreign diplomatic trips for Nixon through his role as Treasury Secretary.

Historian Bruce Schulman wrote that Nixon was "awed" by the handsome, urbane Texan who was also a tough political fighter. Schulman added that Henry Kissinger, Nixon's National Security Advisor, noted that Connally was the only cabinet member whom Nixon did not disparage behind his back, and that this was high praise indeed.

== Democrats for Nixon and party switch ==
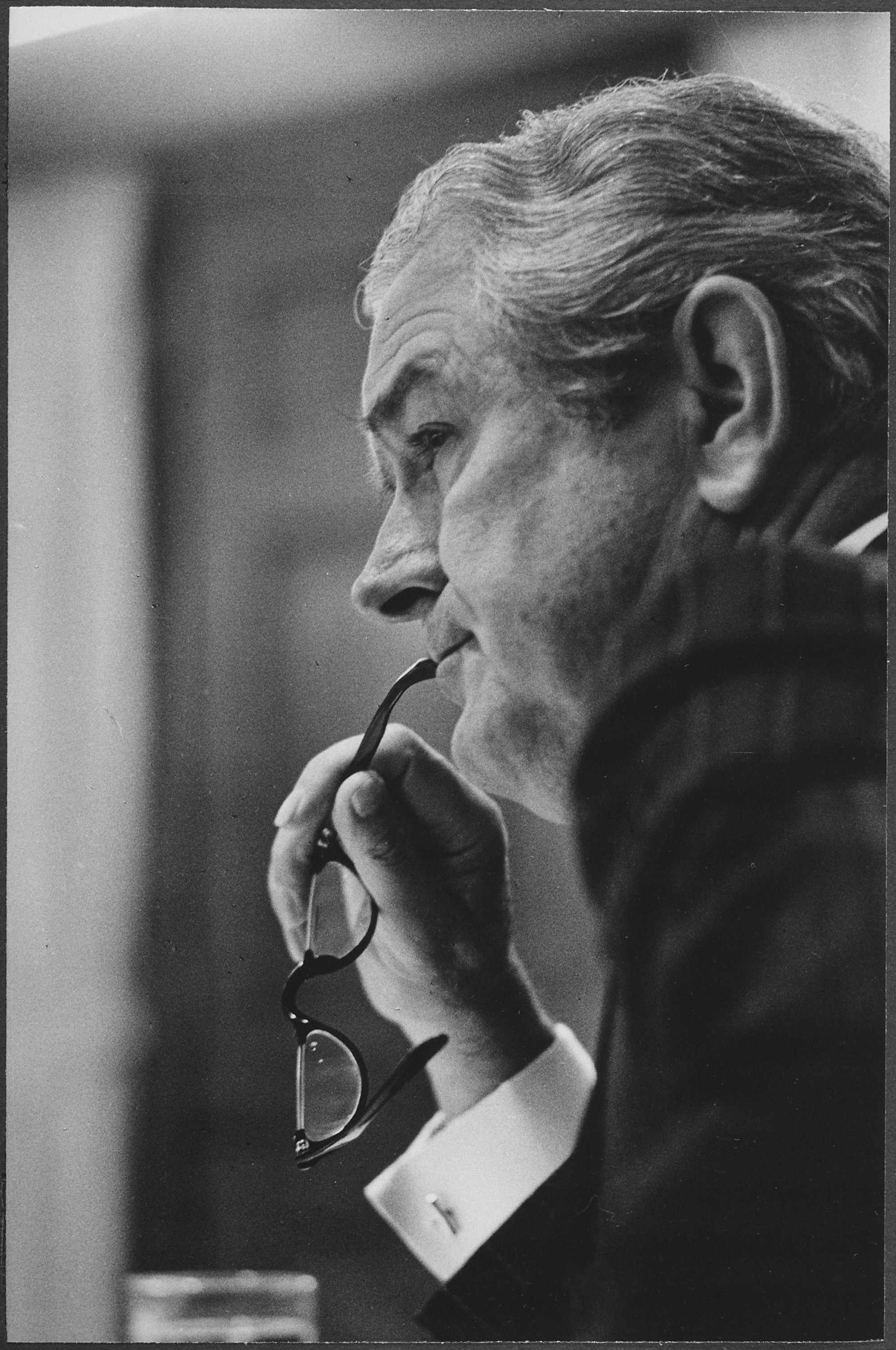
Connally on August 15, 1971

Connally stepped down as Treasury Secretary in May 1972 to head "Democrats for Nixon", a Republican-funded campaign to promote Democratic support for Nixon in the 1972 presidential election. Connally's former mentor, Lyndon B. Johnson, stood behind Democratic presidential nominee George McGovern of South Dakota, although McGovern had long opposed Johnson's foreign and defense policies. It was the first time that Connally and Johnson were publicly on opposite sides of a general election campaign, although Connally had privately supported the Republican candidate Eisenhower in 1952 and 1956.

In the 1972 U.S. Senate election in Texas, Connally endorsed Democrat Harold Barefoot Sanders, later a federal judge from Dallas, rather than the Republican incumbent John Tower, also of Dallas. Connally had considered running against Tower in 1966, but chose instead to run for a third term as governor.

After stepping down as Treasury Secretary, Connally served as the top adviser to Nixon's energy policy. In December 1972, Connally travelled to Saudi Arabia with Occidental Petroleum chairman Armand Hammer. Addressing speculation that he was on a "secret peace mission", Nixon said that Connally was travelling privately but that he had asked him to have informal discussions with various world leaders. On that trip Connally did meet with King Faisal and Prince Fahd where the Arab–Israeli conflict and its effect on Saudi Arabia–United States relations were discussed.

In January 1973, Johnson died of heart disease. He and Connally had been friends since 1938. Connally eulogized Johnson during interment services at the LBJ Ranch in Gillespie County, along with the Rev. Billy Graham, who officiated at the service.

In May 1973, Connally joined the Republican Party. When Vice President Spiro Agnew resigned five months later because of scandal, Connally was among Nixon's potential choices to fill the vacancy. However, Nixon instead tapped House Minority Leader Gerald Ford, because he believed Democrats in Congress were less likely to block Ford's appointment. Prominent Texas Democrat Bob Bullock, who had supported McGovern in 1972, disapproved strongly and publicly of Connally's switch, stating that "...I got some ideas on Mr. Connally. He ain't never done nothin' but get shot in Dallas." After William P. Rogers resigned as Secretary of State in September 1973, Nixon was reported to have considered appointing Connally to the position. Nixon admired Connally; to the point that he wished for him to be his successor, while the two of them discussed the idea of setting up (as noted by one historian) “a new, distinctly Whiggish party, which the president wanted to call the “Independent Conservative Party.””

Connally joined the Committee on the Present Danger, founded in 1976.

== Indictment, trial and acquittal ==
In July 1974, Connally was indicted for allegedly pocketing $10,000 from dairy industry lawyer Jake Jacobsen in exchange for influencing the government to increase federal dairy price support. Further charges included Connally allegedly pocketing another $5,000 from Jacobsen after making a call to Thruston Morton, who was charging Jacobsen with fraud after a business venture of his had fallen through. At his April 1975 trial, Connally's defense called as character witnesses former First Ladies Jacqueline Kennedy and Lady Bird Johnson, as well as Texas state senator Barbara Jordan (the first female, black state senator in Texas history), Dean Rusk, Robert McNamara and Billy Graham.

According to a November 1979 profile by Paul Burka in Texas Monthly magazine, "The case turned first on whether Connally would simultaneously be tried for perjury—some embarrassing inconsistencies had crept into his pretrial testimony—but his lawyer was able to prevent it, and then the issue came down to whether John Connally or Jake Jacobsen was telling the truth." On the strength of the defense's prominent character witnesses, Connally was acquitted.

== 1980 presidential run ==
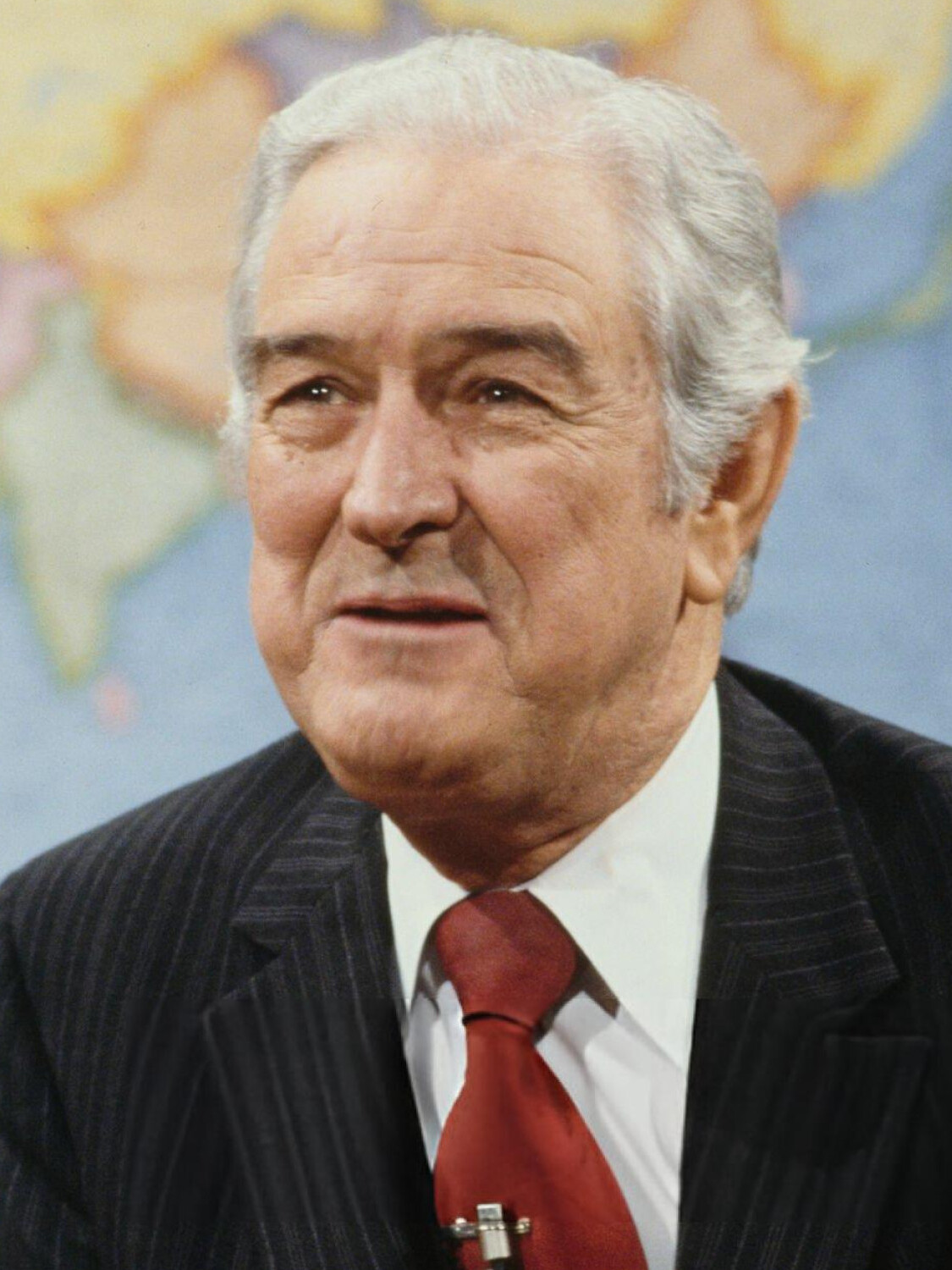
Connally in 1980

Connally announced in January 1979 that he would seek the Republican nomination for president in 1980. He was considered a great orator and strong leader and was featured on the cover of Time with the heading "Hot on the Trail", but his wheeler-dealer image remained a liability, particularly in New England, an ancestrally Republican area. Connally drew the backing of Republican state representative Fred Agnich of Dallas. Connally raised more money than any other candidate, but he was never able to overtake the popular conservative front-runner, Ronald Reagan of California, which frustrated Connally deeply. Connally spent his money nationally, while rival candidate George H. W. Bush, also from Houston, targeted his time and money in early states and won the Iowa caucus. This was also due to his campaign manager, Eddie Mahe Jr, believing that his time was better spent in Southern states, where Connally was already a strong competitor.

Connally's views on foreign policy in the Middle East led to the New York Times calling him the "favored Saudi candidate". Most controversially, he gave a speech in front of the National Press Club where he called firmly for a two-state solution in the Middle East in which Israel would permanently withdraw from all of the territory it occupied after the Six Day War of 1967, while Palestine would either become a state or a region of Jordan, in exchange for the recognition of Israel by the Arab states and a firm flow of oil. The speech was blamed for many of the following failures of the Connally campaign, including a fall in the polls.

Following his loss in Iowa, Connally focused on South Carolina, an early primary state in which he had the support of U.S. Senator Strom Thurmond. He lost there to Reagan 55 to 30 percent and withdrew from the contest. Despite spending $11 million during the campaign, Connally secured the support of only a single delegate, Ada Mills of Clarksville, Arkansas, who became nationally known for a brief time as the "$11 million delegate".

After withdrawing, Connally endorsed Reagan and appeared with the former governor at the Dallas-Fort Worth Airport, fundraisers and other campaign events. During a press conference, Connally was asked if he thought Reagan was the best man to be president. Connally joked, "I think he's the second best man I can think of."

Connally was reported to have been interested in becoming Secretary of State or Secretary of Defense in the Reagan Administration, but was only offered the post of Secretary of Energy, which he turned down. Governor of Texas Bill Clements said that Connally rejected the position for personal reasons and to focus on his law practice with Vinson & Elkins. He purchased a $1 million apartment in Washington, D.C., from one of the Shah's sisters, reportedly due to higher political aspirations. He was assigned as one of the President's Foreign Intelligence Advisory Board's 19 members.

=== Iran hostage interference allegations ===
In 2023, The New York Times published allegations by Ben Barnes, a longtime Connally associate, who claimed that Connally had interfered with Iran hostage crisis negotiations in 1980 in order to aid the Reagan campaign and gain favor with Reagan. Barnes said that during a tour of the Middle East in the summer of 1980, Connally met with several regional leaders to convince them to tell Iran that they would get a better deal from Reagan if they continued to hold the American hostages until after the November election.

While this trip has been verified and Connally was in touch with Reagan associates, it is unclear if he was acting at anyone's direction, or if his message reached Iran or had any impact there.

== Later years ==
In 1981, Connally was alleged to be aware of Operation Red Dog, a plot by white supremacists to overthrow the government of Dominica, by Michael Perdue. Connally, along with Ron Paul, was found to have no connection to the plot and was not subpoenaed as part of the trial.

In 1986, Connally filed for bankruptcy as a result of a string of business losses in Houston. In December 1990, Connally and Oscar Wyatt, chairman of the Coastal Oil Corporation, met with President Saddam Hussein of Iraq. Hussein had been holding foreigners as hostages (or "guests" as Hussein called them) at strategic military sites in Iraq. After the meeting, Hussein agreed to release the hostages.

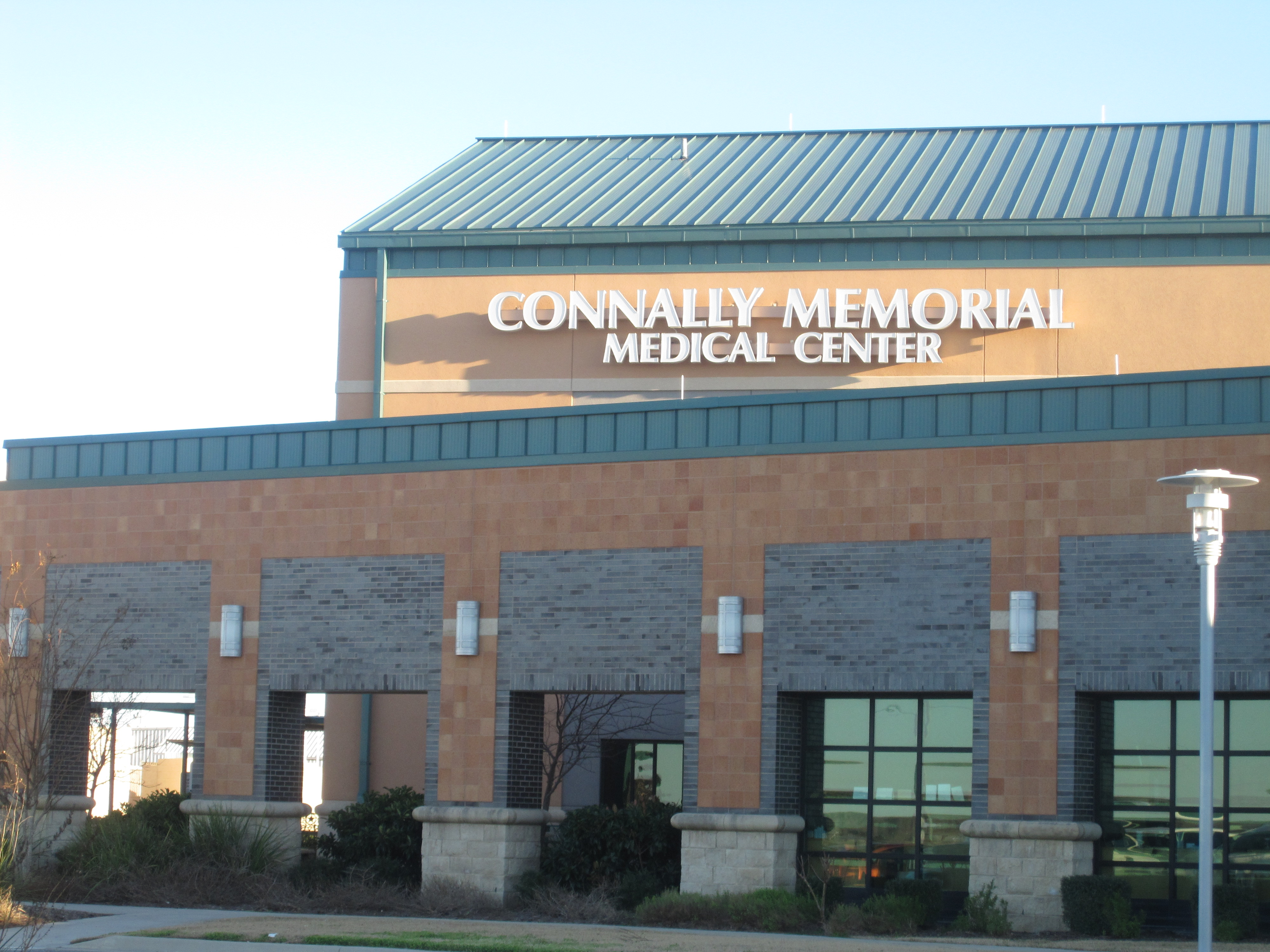
The Connally Memorial Medical Center on U.S. Highway 181 in Floresville

In one of his last political acts, Connally endorsed Ross Perot in the 1992 presidential election and Republican congressman Jack Fields of Houston in the special election called in May 1993 to fill the vacancy left by U.S. Senator Lloyd Bentsen of Houston.

== Illness and death ==
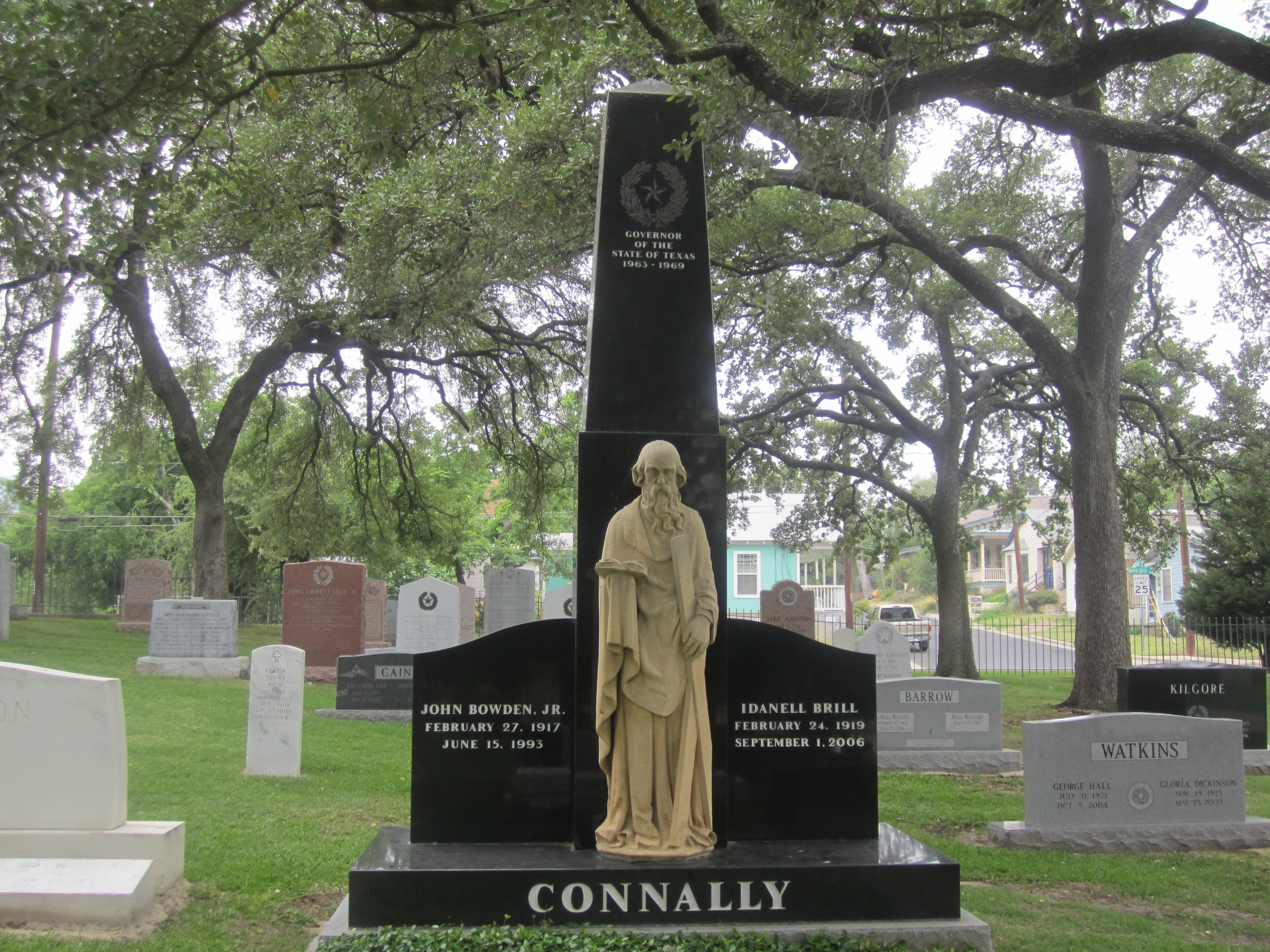
Connally tombstone at Texas State Cemetery in Austin, Texas

On May 17, 1993, Connally began to have trouble breathing and was admitted to the Houston Methodist Hospital in Houston, where he died from pulmonary fibrosis, on June 15, at the age of 76.

When Connally died, forensic pathologist Dr. Cyril Wecht and the Assassination Archives and Research Center petitioned Attorney General Janet Reno to recover the remaining bullet fragments from Connally's body, contending that the fragments would disprove the Warren Commission's single-bullet, single-gunman conclusion. The Justice Department replied that it "...would have no legal authority to recover the fragments unless Connally's family gave it permission." Connally's family refused permission.

His funeral was held on June 17, 1993, at the First United Methodist Church of Austin where he and his wife, Nellie Connally, had been members since 1963. Former president Nixon was in attendance. Connally's wife Nellie died in 2006; they are interred together at the Texas State Cemetery in Austin.

== Legacy ==
A number of buildings and institutions in Texas bear Connally's name. Educational institutions named for him including the John B. Connally Middle School, part of Northside ISD, and John B. Connally High School, part of Pflugerville ISD. Texas A&M University and Texas State Technical College each have a building named in his honor. Other notable institutions named for him include a portion of Interstate 410 in San Antonio, the Connally Loop, and the John B. Connally Unit of the Texas Department of Criminal Justice in Karnes County. The Connally Memorial Medical Center in Floresville is named for the Connally family. Downtown Houston has a life-sized statue of Connally in Connally Plaza.

In January 1964, Connally donated the suit he wore on November 22, 1963, to the Texas State Library and Archives Commission (TSLAC). The suit was displayed to the public until March 1964. In 2000, TSLAC loaned the suit to the National Archives and Records Administration for examination purposes. From October 2013 to February 2014, the suit was featured as part of an exhibit at the TSLAC to commemorate the 50th anniversary of the Kennedy assassination.

== See also ==
- List of U.S. political appointments that crossed party lines
- List of governors of Texas
- The Milk Case

Political offices
Preceded by William B. Franke	United States Secretary of the Navy; 1961	Succeeded by Fred Korth
Preceded by Price Daniel	Governor of Texas; 1963–1969	Succeeded by Preston Smith
Preceded by David M. Kennedy	United States Secretary of the Treasury; 1971–1972	Succeeded by George P. Shultz
Party political offices
Preceded by Price Daniel	Democratic nominee for Governor of Texas; 1962, 1964, 1966	Succeeded by Preston Smith
New office	Chair of the Democratic Governors Association; 1965–1966	Succeeded by Harold Hughes
