= 1962 Texas gubernatorial election =

- November 6, 1962
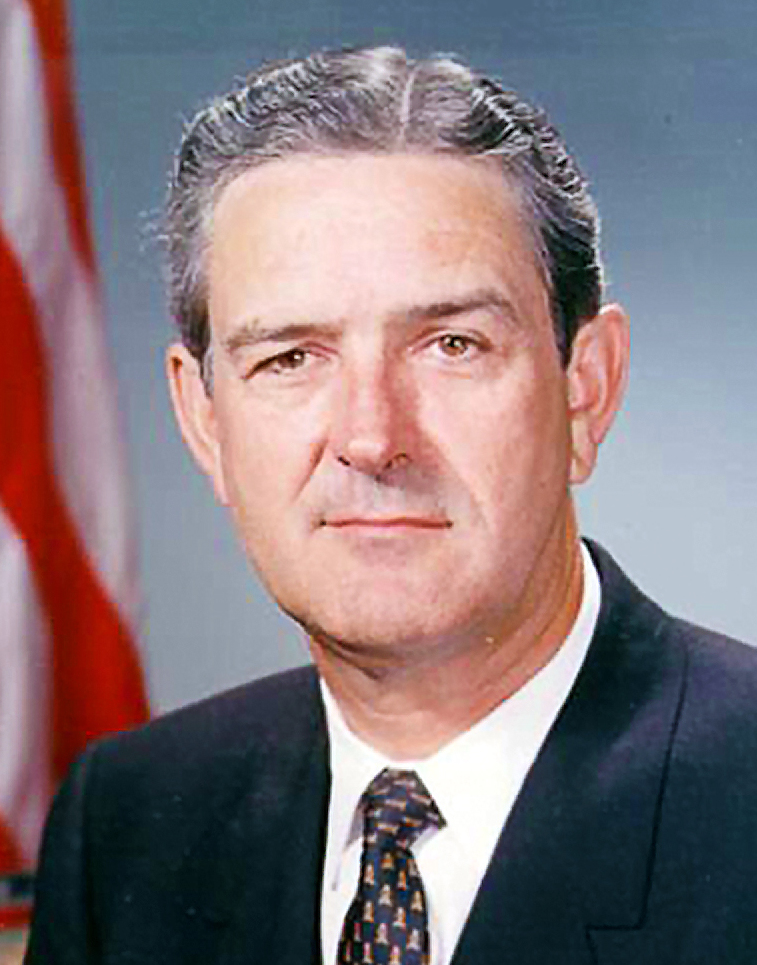

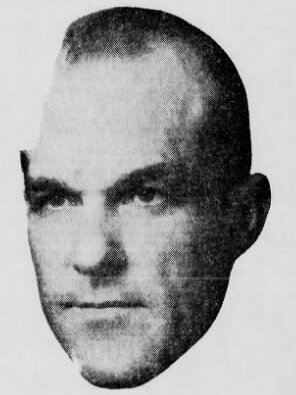
Nominee	John Connally	Jack Cox
Party	Democratic	Republican
Popular vote	847,038	715,025
Percentage	53.98%	45.57%
- County results Connally: 40–50% 50–60% 60–70% 70–80% 80–90% Cox: 40–50% 50–60% 60–70% 70–80%
Governor before election
Price Daniel
Democratic
Elected Governor
John Connally
Democratic

The 1962 Texas gubernatorial election was held on November 6, 1962, to elect the governor of Texas. Incumbent Democratic governor Price Daniel was running for reelection to a fourth term, but was defeated in the primary by John Connally. Although Connally was easily elected, Republican Jack Cox's 46% of the vote was the highest received by any Republican candidate for governor since Edmund J. Davis's victory in 1869.

== Democratic primary ==
=== Candidates ===
- John Connally, United States Secretary of the Navy and former aide to Lyndon Johnson
- Price Daniel, incumbent governor
- Marshall Formby, highway commissioner from Plainview
- Edwin Walker, former U.S. Army major general and anti-communist activist
- Will Wilson, Texas Attorney General
- Don Yarborough, Houston attorney and candidate for lieutenant governor in 1960

John Connally announced two weeks before Christmas of 1961 that he was leaving the position of Secretary of the Navy to seek the Democratic nomination. Texas Attorney General Will Wilson also entered the campaign, accusing Lyndon B. Johnson of engineering Connally's candidacy. Other primary candidates were highway commissioner Marshall Formby of Plainview, another party conservative, and General Edwin A. Walker, who made anti-communism the centerpiece of his campaign.

=== Campaign ===
Democratic incumbent Marion Price Daniel Sr. was running for a fourth consecutive two-year term, but was in political trouble following the enactment of a two-cent state sales tax in 1961, which had soured many voters on his administration. Daniel had let the tax become law without his signature, choosing not to veto the measure.

=== Results ===
Democratic primary results
Party	Candidate	Votes	%
Democratic	John Connally	431,498	29.82%
Democratic	Don Yarborough	317,986	21.97%
Democratic	Price Daniel (incumbent)	248,524	17.17%
Democratic	Will Wilson	171,617	11.86%
Democratic	Marshall Formby	139,094	9.61%
Democratic	Edwin Walker	138,387	9.56%
Total votes		1,447,115	100.00%

=== Runoff ===
Democratic runoff results
Party	Candidate	Votes	%
Democratic	John Connally	565,174	51.18%
Democratic	Don Yarborough	538,924	48.88%
Total votes		1,104,306	100.00%

== Republican primary ==
=== Candidates ===
- Jack Cox, former state representative from Stephens County and Democratic candidate for governor in 1960
- Roy Whittenburg, rancher and oilman

=== Results ===
Republican primary results
Party	Candidate	Votes	%
Republican	Jack Cox	99,170	86.01%
Republican	Roy Whittenburg	16,136	13.99%
Total votes		115,306	100.00%

== General election ==
On October 18,1962, the Dallas League of Women Voters hosted a debate for the candidates. The debate was notable for the participation of Jack Carswell, a candidate from the Constitution Party, a minor right-wing party which was founded in 1952.

General election results
Party	Candidate	Votes	%	±%
Democratic	John Connally	847,038	53.98%	▼18.77
Republican	Jack Cox	715,025	45.57%	▲18.32
Constitution	Jack Carswell	7,125	0.45%	N/A
Total votes		1,569,198	100.00%	
Democratic hold				
