= 1966 Texas gubernatorial election =

- November 8, 1966
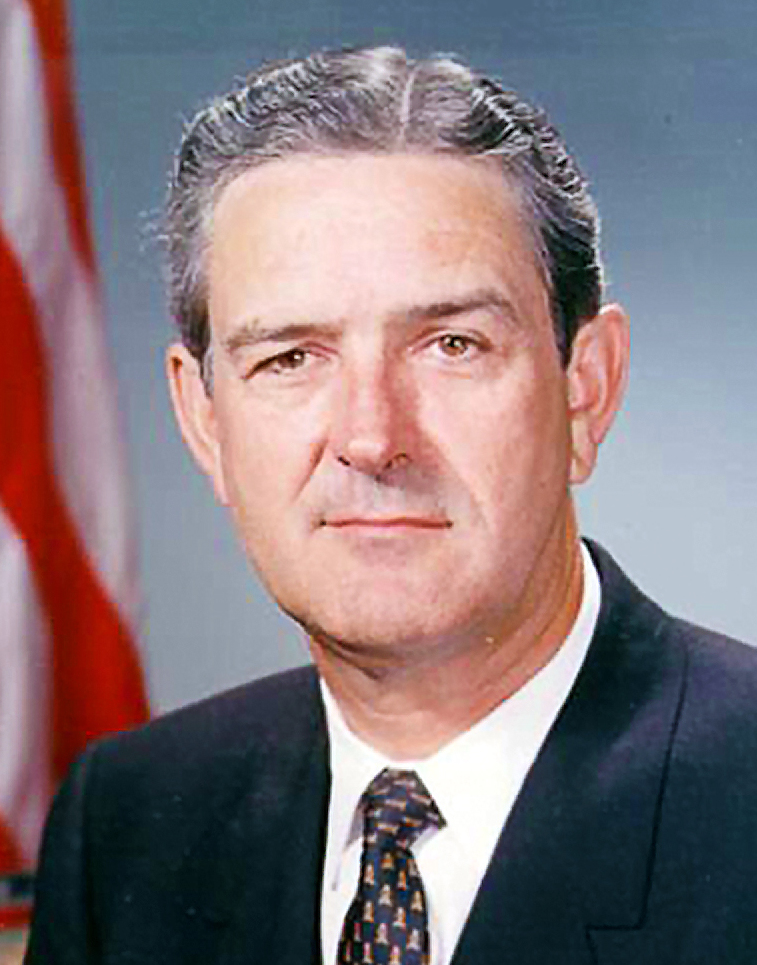

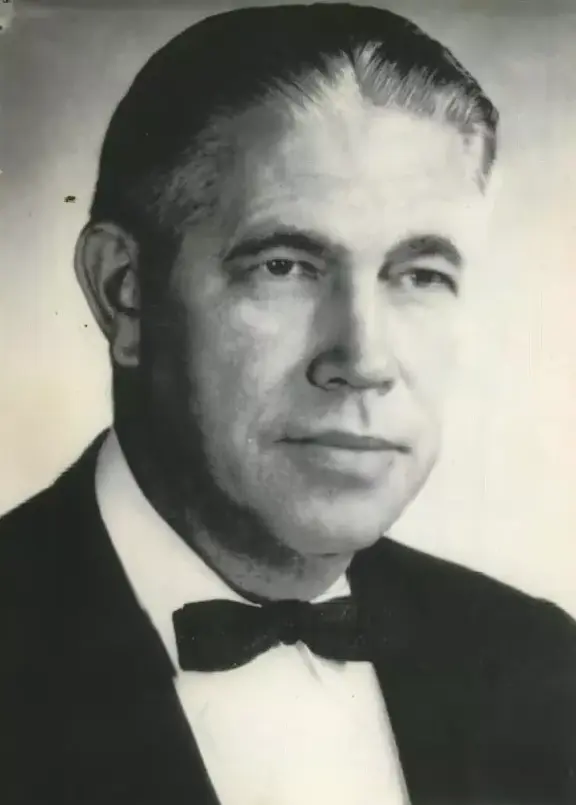
Nominee	John Connally	T. E. Kennerly
Party	Democratic	Republican
Popular vote	1,037,517	368,025
Percentage	72.76%	25.81%
- County results Connally: 50–60% 60–70% 70–80% 80–90% >90%
Governor before election
John Connally
Democratic
Elected Governor
John Connally
Democratic

The 1966 Texas gubernatorial election was held on November 8, 1966, to elect the governor of Texas. Incumbent Democratic governor John Connally was easily reelected to a third term, winning 73% of the vote to Republican T. E. Kennerly's 26%. Connally swept all 254 counties in this election and was inaugurated for his third term on January 17, 1967.

The election is, to date, the last time that a candidate for Governor of Texas won more than 70% of the vote, as well as the last in which a candidate won every county. As of 2026, Randall, Ochiltree, and Smith counties have not voted for the Democratic candidate since this election.

== Primaries ==
=== Republican ===
Republican primary results
Party	Candidate	Votes	%
Republican	T. E. Kennerly	49,568	100.00%
Total votes		49,568	100.00%

=== Democratic ===
Democratic primary results
Party	Candidate	Votes	%
Democratic	John Connally (incumbent)	932,641	74.29%
Democratic	Stanley C. Woods	291,651	23.23%
Democratic	Johnnie Mae Hackworthe	31,105	2.48%
Total votes		1,255,400	100.00%

== Results ==
General election results
Party	Candidate	Votes	%	±%
Democratic	John Connally (incumbent)	1,037,517	72.76%	▲1.03
Republican	T. E. Kennerly	368,025	25.81%	▼0.19
Constitution	Tommye Gillespie	10,454	0.73%	▲0.41
Conservative	Bard Logan	9,810	0.69%	N/A
Write-in		55	0.00%	N/A
Total votes		1,425,861	100.00%	
Democratic hold				
