= La Casa, Texas =

Coordinates: 32°36′03″N 98°41′22″W

La Casa was a small community in southeastern Stephens County, Texas, United States.

Today it is considered a ghost town.
