= Gunsight, Texas =

Gunsight
- Unincorporated community
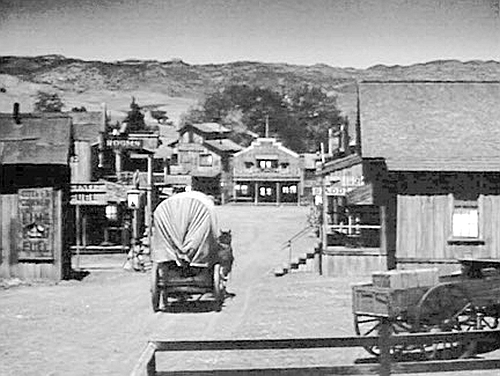
- Gunsight, 1872
- Interactive map of Gunsight
- Location within Texas Gunsight (the United States)
- Coordinates: 32°32′29″N 98°52′16″W
- Country: United States
- State: Texas
- County: Stephens County
- Elevation: 1,421 ft (433 m)
- GNIS feature ID: 1378397

Gunsight is an unincorporated community at the junction of Country Road 154 and Country Road 157 in Stephens County, Texas, United States.

== History ==
The community was settled in 1858 on a wagon road leading to Stephenville from Fort Worth, and was named after the nearby Gunsight Mountains. In 1870, the settlement had a post office in the store owned by J. W. Shepard, a school, two churches, a gristmill, general store, cotton gin, and a population of 50. Due to its location near the Wichita Falls and Southern Railway, the population increased to 150 in 1920 during an oil boom in the area. The railroad and post office were discontinued in the 1920s, and by the late 20th century the population was six. Two churches and a cemetery remain.

A historical marker is located at Gunsight.
