= 1970 United States Senate election in Texas =

- November 3, 1970
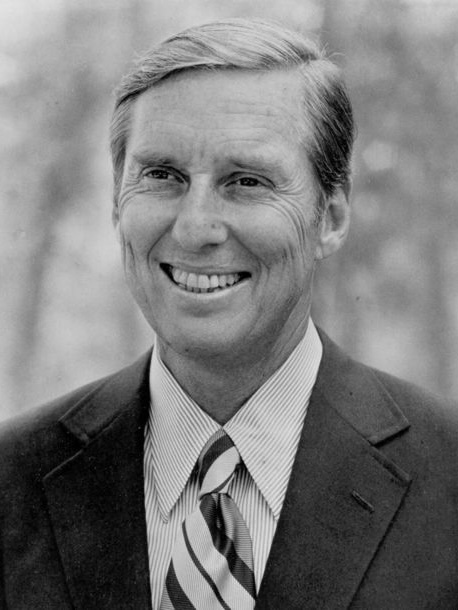

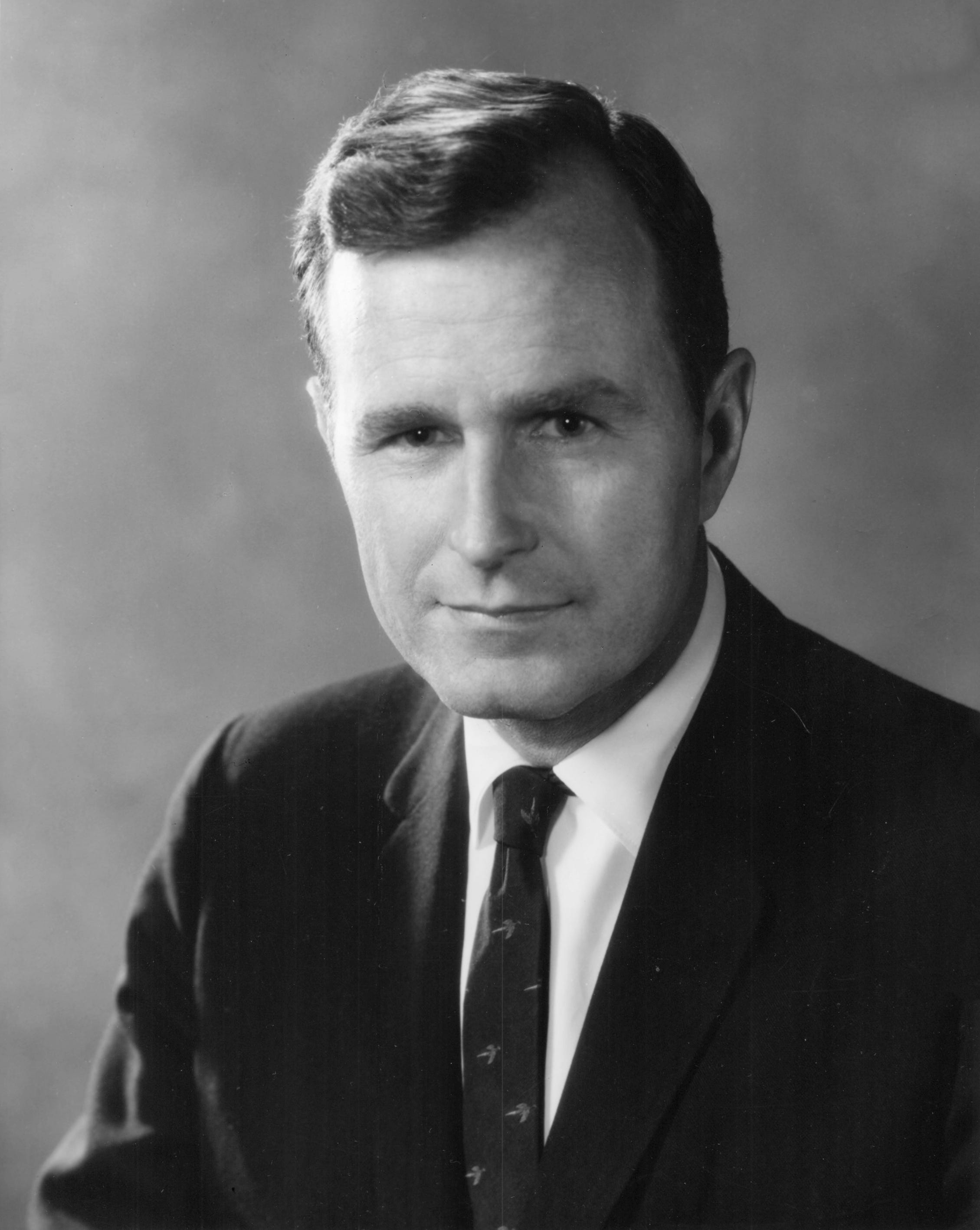
Nominee	Lloyd Bentsen	George H. W. Bush
Party	Democratic	Republican
Popular vote	1,194,069	1,035,794
Percentage	53.55%	46.45%
- Bentsen: 50–60% 60–70% 70–80% 80–90% >90% Bush: 50–60% 60–70%
U.S. senator before election
Ralph Yarborough
Democratic
Elected U.S. Senator
Lloyd Bentsen
Democratic

The 1970 United States Senate election in Texas was held on November 3, 1970. Incumbent Democratic U.S. Senator Ralph Yarborough was defeated by former U.S. Representative Lloyd Bentsen in the Democratic primary. Bentsen then defeated Republican U.S. Representative and future president George H. W. Bush in the general election. When Bush ran for president eighteen years later, his Democratic opponent, Massachusetts Governor Michael Dukakis, selected Bentsen as his vice presidential running mate.

This was both the last time any incumbent senator from Texas lost renomination and the last time a non-incumbent Democrat was elected to the U.S. Senate in Texas until 2026.

== Democratic primary ==
=== Candidates ===
==== Nominee ====
- Lloyd Bentsen, former U.S. representative from TX-15 (1948–1955)

==== Eliminated in primary ====
- Ralph Yarborough, incumbent U.S. senator (1957–1971)

=== Campaign ===
Yarborough, a liberal icon, was challenged by the more conservative Bentsen in the Democratic primary. In what was characterized as an extremely bitter campaign, Bentsen accused Yarborough of supporting desegregation busing and criticized his opposition to the Vietnam War. Many Texas liberals threatened to support the Republican Bush if Bentsen won the primary, believing that the liberal wing of the Texas Democratic Party would be threatened if Bentsen were elected. Bentsen ultimately defeated Yarborough in the Democratic primary on May 2, 1970.

=== Results ===
Democratic primary results by county Bentsen: Bentsen—80–90%; Bentsen—70–80%; Bentsen—60–70%; Bentsen—50–60%; Yarborough: Yarborough—>90%; Yarborough—70–80%; Yarborough—60–70%; Yarborough—50–60%

Democratic primary results
Party	Candidate	Votes	%
Democratic	Lloyd Bentsen	841,316	53.7%
Democratic	Ralph Yarborough (incumbent)	726,477	46.3%
Total votes		1,567,793	100.0%

== Republican primary ==
Bush was unopposed for the Republican nomination.

=== Candidates ===
- George H. W. Bush, U.S. Representative, nominee in 1964

== General election ==
The general election was held November 3, 1970. Bentsen defeated Bush, 53.5% – 46.5%.

=== Results ===
General election results
Party	Candidate	Votes	%	±%
Democratic	Lloyd Bentsen	1,194,069	53.55%	▼2.67%
Republican	George H. W. Bush	1,035,794	46.45%	▲2.89%
Total votes		2,229,863	100.0%	
Democratic hold				
