= National Register of Historic Places listings in Stephens County, Texas =

Location of Stephens County in Texas

This is a list of the National Register of Historic Places listings in Stephens County, Texas.

This is intended to be a complete list of properties listed on the National Register of Historic Places in Stephens County, Texas. There are two properties listed on the National Register in the county. One property is both a State Antiquities Landmark and a Recorded Texas Historic Landmark.

This National Park Service list is complete through NPS recent listings posted March 21, 2025.

== Current listings ==
The publicly disclosed locations of National Register properties may be seen in a mapping service provided.

	Name on the Register	Image	Date listed	Location	City or town	Description
1	Fort Davis Family Fort	Fort Davis Family Fort	October 28, 1992 (#92001363)	Address restricted 32°54′55″N 99°05′35″W	Breckenridge	
2	Stephens County Courthouse	Stephens County Courthouse	July 9, 1997 (#97000781)	200 W. Walker St. 32°45′21″N 98°54′15″W	Breckenridge	State Antiquities Landmark, Recorded Texas Historic Landmark

== See also ==
- National Register of Historic Places listings in Texas
- Recorded Texas Historic Landmarks in Stephens County
