= Jack Cox (Texas politician) =

American politician (1921–1990)

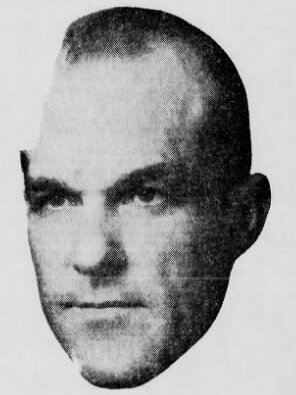

Member of the Texas House of Representatives from the 108th district
- In office January 14, 1947 – January 13, 1953
- Preceded by: Paul Counts

Personal details
- Born: August 20, 1921 Stephens, Texas, U.S.
- Died: April 27, 1990 (aged 68) Abilene, Texas, U.S.
- Party: Republican (1961–1990); Democratic (until 1961)
- Spouse: Joyce Smyrl
- Children: 2
- Education: North Texas State College

Military service
- Branch/service: United States Navy
- Years of service: 1940–1945
- Battles/wars: World War II

Jack Cox (August 20, 1921 – April 27, 1990) was an American politician active in Texas. Cox, a three-term Democratic member of the Texas House of Representatives, became a vital figure in the revitalization of the Republican Party of Texas.

== Biography ==
Cox was born in Stephens County, Texas on August 20, 1921. He served in the United States Navy and saw action in the Pacific theater of World War II. He graduated from North Texas State University and returned to his home county. In 1946, Cox was elected to the Texas House of Representatives in the 50th Texas Legislature from the 108th district, which at the time contained Palo Pinto and Stephens counties. He was re-elected in 1948 and 1950.

After his time in the Texas House, he switched parties and became a Republican. In the 1962 Texas gubernatorial election, Cox was the Republican nominee against former Secretary of the Navy and Democratic nominee John Connally. Connally defeated Cox by an eight-point margin; the closest gubernatorial election since 1924.

Cox died from cancer on April 27, 1990.
