= Constitution Party (United States, 1952) =

Former U.S. political party

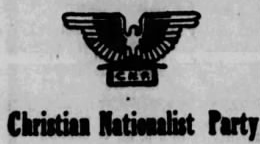
- Founded: 1952
- Dissolved: 1970s
- Ideology: Christian right Paleoconservatism; Segregationism
- Political position: Far-right

The Constitution Party, or the Christian Nationalist Party or America First Party in some states, was a loosely organized far-right third party in the United States that was primarily active in Texas, founded in 1952 to support former General Douglas MacArthur for president and drafted other prominent politicians for presidential elections, or attempted to. The party gave its support or presidential nominations to other right-wing presidential candidates or military figures until its dissolution sometime in the 1970s.

== History ==
=== 1952 presidential election ===
The party held its founding convention in Chicago, Illinois during which Republican representatives Howard Buffett and Ralph W. Gwinn attempted to convince the attendees to rejoin the Republican party, but were unsuccessful. Both the chairman, Percy L. Greaves, and co-chairman, Suzanne Stevenson, resigned after anti-Semitic remarks by Upton Close. The party was anti-communist and Tyrone Lee Wertz, chairman of the Pennsylvania affiliate, criticized the Republican and Democratic presidential candidates, Dwight D. Eisenhower and Adlai Stevenson II, for not having stances on communist infiltration.

During the 1952 presidential election, they nominated Douglas MacArthur for president and Senator Harry F. Byrd for vice president, albeit without permission from either candidate; Byrd later tried unsuccessfully to prevent his name from appearing on the Texas ballot. The party initially planned to only attempt to have electoral college electors vote for MacArthur and Byrd without any plans of seeking ballot access, but later decided to place them onto ballots and the ticket received 17,205 votes in the general election. In 1953, the party's affiliate in Ohio voted at a statewide meeting to ask MacArthur to become its chairman, but he declined the offer.

=== 1956 presidential election ===
By 1956, the party had state affiliates in New York, Colorado, Pennsylvania, California, Texas, and Illinois. On August 28, 1956, the party gave its nomination to former Commissioner of Internal Revenue T. Coleman Andrews and former Representative Thomas H. Werdel who also appeared on ballots as States' Rights and Independent candidates and received 107,929 votes in the general election with 14,589 votes coming from the Constitution ballot line in Texas.

On September 8, the Texas affiliate gave its gubernatorial nomination to Senator W. Lee O'Daniel, but he was not allowed onto the ballot as he had participated in the Democratic primary where he came in third place. However, he ran as a write-in candidate and received 110,234 votes in the general election. Later, during the 1958 elections, the Texas-based Constitution Party would run more candidates than the Republican Party of Texas.

=== 1960 presidential election ===
On July 30, 1960, 125 Texas delegates voted at a meeting to ask for equal radio time during the debates between John F. Kennedy and Richard Nixon. The delegates also criticized Senator Barry Goldwater for endorsing Nixon. On August 8, the Texas-based Constitution Party nominated Charles L. Sullivan for president and retired Marine Corps Brigadier General Merritt B. Curtis for vice president while another ticket composed of Merritt B. Curtis and Curtis B. Dall ran in Washington. Sullivan and Curtis received 18,162 votes from Texas and Curtis and Miller received 1,401 votes in Washington.

During the 1962 Texas gubernatorial election Jack Carswell was given the gubernatorial nomination and he participated in a debate against Jack Cox and John Connally. In the lieutenant gubernatorial election the party's nominee, Roy R. Brown, withdrew from the election and endorsed Bill Hayes, the Republican nominee.

=== 1964 presidential election ===
In 1963, the party offered its presidential nomination to Senator Strom Thurmond, but he declined. During the 1964 presidential election members of the party left to support Senator Goldwater in the Republican presidential primary while those who stayed criticized him for being too flexible and not conservative enough. Governor George Wallace was offered the keynote address at the convention and the party's presidential nomination, but declined both offers.

Joseph B. Lightburn, who had served as the chairman of the West Virginia affiliate in 1952 and served as mayor of Jane Lew, West Virginia for two terms, and Theodore Billings of Colorado were given the party's presidential and vice presidential nominations and received 5,061 votes.

=== 1968 presidential election ===
In 1967, the Louisiana and Florida affiliates held rallies and petition drives in support of Wallace if he were to run for president. During the 1968 presidential election the party supported the American Independent Party's candidates Governor George Wallace and General Curtis LeMay, but in North Dakota Richard K. Troxell and Merle Thayer were given the presidential and vice presidential nominations and received 34 votes. George Wallace was on the ballot in fifty states receiving 9,901,118 votes for 13.53% of the popular vote and winning five states for 45 electoral votes along with one North Carolina "faithless elector".

== Platform ==
The party was staunchly anti-communist and supported Senator Joseph McCarthy's investigations as well Immigration and Nationality Act of 1952 to prevent the entry of immigrants that were sympathetic to communism. It was isolationist with its support for the Bricker Amendment to limit American foreign involvement, ending all foreign aid, withdrawing from the United Nations, and its opposition to American involvement in the Vietnam War.

The party was in favor of racial segregation, supported repealing the Civil Rights Act of 1964, and opposed the income tax. They criticized Eisenhower's administration as too left-wing and were opposed to the continuation of New Deal policies.

== See also ==
- America First Party (1943)
- Christian Nationalist Party (1947)
