= Don Yarborough =

American lawyer

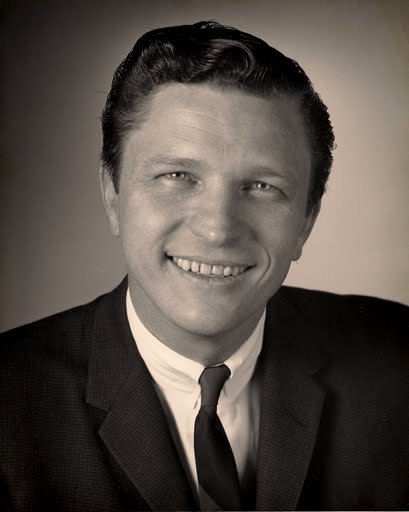

Personal details
- Born: December 15, 1925 New Orleans, Louisiana, U.S.
- Died: September 23, 2009 (aged 83) Houston, Texas, U.S.
- Party: Democratic
- Education: San Jacinto High School; University of Texas at Austin; University of Texas School of Law
- Occupation: Attorney, Politician

Donald Howard Yarborough (December 15, 1925 – September 23, 2009) was an American Democratic politician who was among the first in the U.S. South to endorse the Civil Rights Act of 1964. Yarborough was an attorney in Houston, Texas. He ran for governor of Texas in 1962, 1964 and 1968.

== Background ==
Yarborough was born in New Orleans, Louisiana. His father was the president of a bank in New Orleans that went bust during the Great Depression, so Don was sent to Mississippi temporarily. His father eventually got a job with the government and moved the family to Washington, D.C. His family also spent time during the years after the depression living with relatives in Coral Gables, Florida. The family eventually moved together to Houston when he was twelve. His mother, Inez Black Yarborough, was head of the Women in Yellow volunteer corps at the Jefferson Davis Hospital in Houston.

Upon graduating from San Jacinto High School at seventeen, he enlisted in the United States Marine Corps, entered officer's training school, and became a company commander at the age of nineteen. He served one year in China at the close of World War II. After the war, Yarborough enrolled at the University of Texas at Austin, where he belonged to the Kappa Alpha Order fraternity, and worked part-time to supplement the money he received under the G.I. Bill of Rights. He earned his law degree from the University of Texas School of Law in 1950.

Shortly after earning his law degree, Yarborough re-entered the Marine Corps to serve during the Korean War as a member of the Judge Advocate General's Corps. He then returned to Texas to establish his own law firm and take part in civic affairs. In 1956, as president of the Houston Junior Chamber International, Yarborough won the national debating championship for the organization. In 1960, Yarborough married his first wife, Katherine Edwards.

== Career ==
In his first run for political office, Yarborough ran in 1960 for Texas lieutenant governor. In 1962, he ran for the first time for governor, and in a field of five Democratic candidates, he reached a run-off with John Connally and came within 28,000 votes of winning the nomination, a nationally noted near-upset in a state long dominated by the conservative faction of the Democratic Party. He ran for governor again in 1964 and 1968. In political life, he supported civil rights, economic justice, environmental protection, and women's equality, and challenged the business establishment within Texas politics.

In 1963, Yarborough was named by Life magazine as one of the 100 young Americans who were "distinguished by their dedication to something larger than private success, because they dared to act against old problems, the boldness to try out new ideas, and a hard-bitten, undaunted hopefulness about man."

After leaving politics, Yarborough worked as a lobbyist for the Paraplegia Cure Research in Washington, D.C., where he lived on Capitol Hill and in McLean, Virginia. He also played a role in the Council for a Livable World and was a founding member of biotech research companies.

== Personal life ==
Yarborough was married three times: to Katherine Edwards Yarborough in 1960, Gail Lind in 1978, and to Houston realtor Charity O'Connell Yarborough in 1984.

Yarborough died of Parkinson's disease on September 23, 2009.
