= Stephens County, Texas =

County in Texas, United States

- County
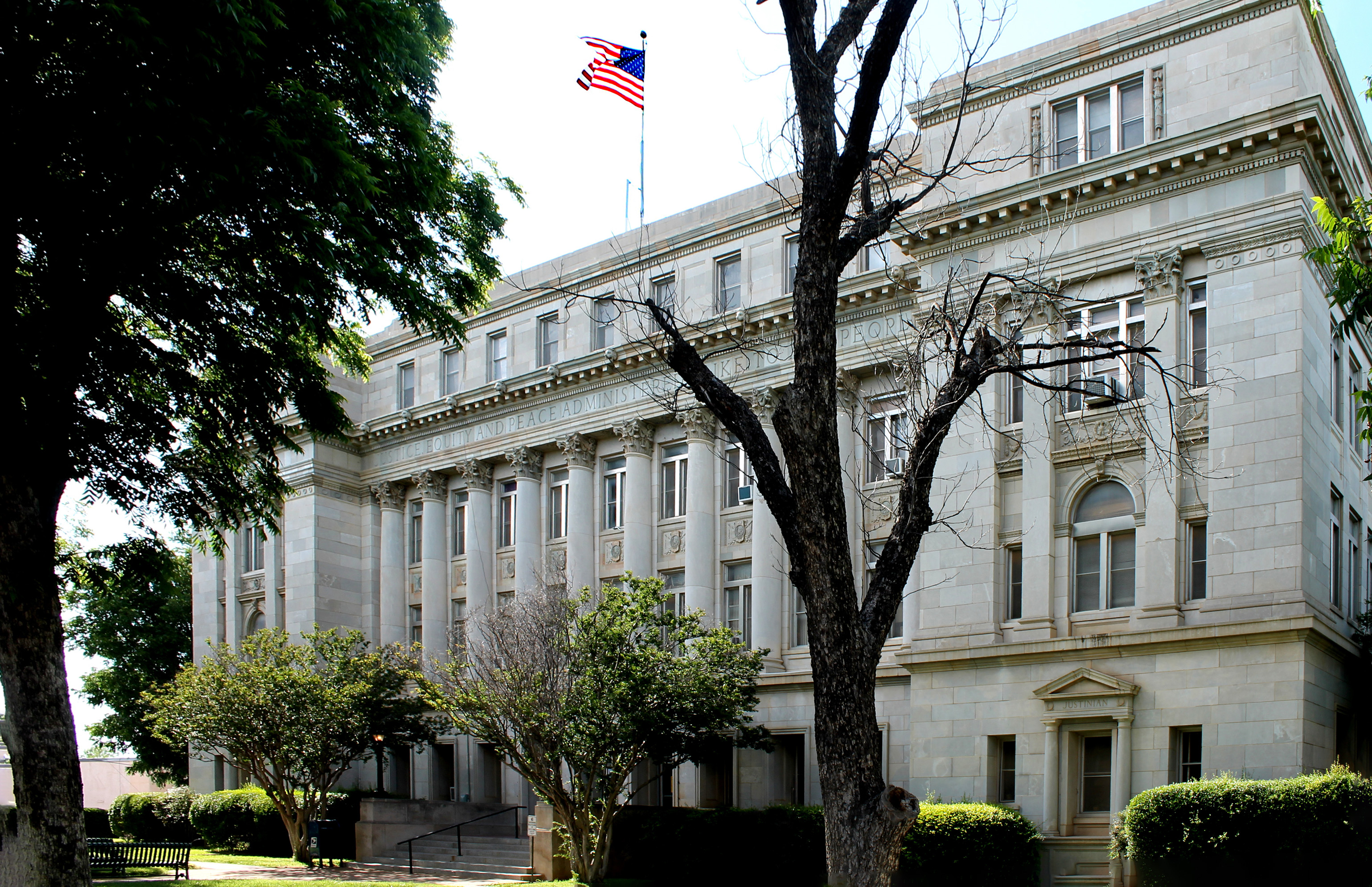
- The Stephens County Courthouse in Breckenridge

- Location within the U.S. state of Texas
- Coordinates: 32°44′N 98°50′W
- Country: United States
- State: Texas
- Founded: 1876
- Named for: Alexander H. Stephens
- Seat: Breckenridge
- Largest city: Breckenridge

Area
  - Total: 921 sq mi (2,390 km^{2})
  - Land: 897 sq mi (2,320 km^{2})
  - Water: 25 sq mi (65 km^{2}) 2.7%

Population (2020)
  - Total: 9,101
  - Estimate (2025): 9,380 ▲
  - Density: 10.1/sq mi (3.92/km^{2})
- Time zone: UTC−6 (Central)
  - Summer (DST): UTC−5 (CDT)
- Congressional district: 25th
- Website: www.co.stephens.tx.us

Stephens County is a county located in the U.S. state of Texas. As of the 2020 census, its population was 9,101. Its county seat is Breckenridge. The county was created in 1858 and organized in 1876. It was originally named Buchanan County, after U.S. President James Buchanan, but was renamed in 1861 for Alexander H. Stephens, the vice president of the Confederate States of America.

== Geography ==
According to the U.S. Census Bureau, the county has a total area of 921 square miles (2,390 km^{2}), of which 25 sq mi (65 km^{2}) (2.7%) are covered by water.

=== Major highways ===
- U.S. Highway 180
- U.S. Highway 183
- State Highway 67
- Loop 252

=== Adjacent counties ===
- Young County (north)
- Palo Pinto County (east)
- Eastland County (south)
- Shackelford County (west)
- Throckmorton County (northwest)

== Demographics ==
Historical population
Census	Pop.	Note	%±
1860	230		—
1870	330		43.5%
1880	4,725		1,331.8%
1890	4,926		4.3%
1900	6,466		31.3%
1910	7,980		23.4%
1920	15,403		93.0%
1930	16,560		7.5%
1940	12,356		−25.4%
1950	10,597		−14.2%
1960	8,885		−16.2%
1970	8,414		−5.3%
1980	9,926		18.0%
1990	9,010		−9.2%
2000	9,674		7.4%
2010	9,630		−0.5%
2020	9,101		−5.5%
2025 (est.)	9,380	▲	3.1%
U.S. Decennial Census; 1850–2010 2010 2020

=== 2020 census ===
As of the 2020 census, the county had a population of 9,101. The median age was 41.8 years. 21.7% of residents were under the age of 18 and 21.1% of residents were 65 years of age or older. For every 100 females there were 110.5 males, and for every 100 females age 18 and over there were 112.1 males age 18 and over.

The racial makeup of the county was 77.1% White, 2.7% Black or African American, 0.7% American Indian and Alaska Native, 0.7% Asian, <0.1% Native Hawaiian and Pacific Islander, 9.8% from some other race, and 9.0% from two or more races. Hispanic or Latino residents of any race comprised 24.2% of the population.

59.9% of residents lived in urban areas, while 40.1% lived in rural areas.

There were 3,463 households in the county, of which 29.8% had children under the age of 18 living in them. Of all households, 49.6% were married-couple households, 17.6% were households with a male householder and no spouse or partner present, and 26.7% were households with a female householder and no spouse or partner present. About 27.8% of all households were made up of individuals and 14.5% had someone living alone who was 65 years of age or older.

There were 4,654 housing units, of which 25.6% were vacant. Among occupied housing units, 73.3% were owner-occupied and 26.7% were renter-occupied. The homeowner vacancy rate was 2.9% and the rental vacancy rate was 16.5%.

=== Racial and ethnic composition ===
Stephens County, Texas – Racial and ethnic composition Note: the US Census treats Hispanic/Latino as an ethnic category. This table excludes Latinos from the racial categories and assigns them to a separate category. Hispanics/Latinos may be of any race.
Race / Ethnicity (NH = Non-Hispanic)	Pop 1980	Pop 1990	Pop 2000	Pop 2010	Pop 2020	% 1980	% 1990	% 2000	% 2010	% 2020
White alone (NH)	8,936	7,950	7,861	7,289	6,256	90.03%	88.24%	81.26%	75.69%	68.74%
Black or African American alone (NH)	341	234	277	195	237	3.44%	2.60%	2.86%	2.02%	2.60%
Native American or Alaska Native alone (NH)	12	29	17	43	36	0.12%	0.32%	0.18%	0.45%	0.40%
Asian alone (NH)	16	28	27	31	60	0.16%	0.31%	0.28%	0.32%	0.66%
Native Hawaiian or Pacific Islander alone (NH)	x	x	2	1	1	x	x	0.02%	0.01%	0.01%
Other race alone (NH)	59	2	2	0	27	0.59%	0.02%	0.02%	0.00%	0.30%
Mixed race or Multiracial (NH)	x	x	70	60	280	x	x	0.72%	0.62%	3.08%
Hispanic or Latino (any race)	562	767	1,418	2,011	2,204	5.66%	8.51%	14.66%	20.88%	24.22%
Total	9,926	9,010	9,674	9,630	9,101	100.00%	100.00%	100.00%	100.00%	100.00%

=== 2000 census ===
As of the 2000 census, 9,674 people, 3,661 households, and 2,591 families resided in the county. The population density was 11 people per square mile (4.2 people/km^{2}). The 4,893 housing units averaged 6 units per square mile (2.3 units/km^{2}). The racial makeup of the county was 86.89% White, 2.92% Black or African American, 0.35% Native American, 0.29% Asian, 0.02% Pacific Islander, 8.15% from other races, and 1.39% from two or more races. About 14.66% of the population was Hispanic or Latino of any race.

Of the 3,661 households, 31.20% had children under the age of 18 living with them, 57.30% were married couples living together, 9.90% had a female householder with no husband present, and 29.20% were not families. Around 26.40% of all households were made up of individuals, and 13.70% had someone living alone who was 65 years of age or older. The average household size was 2.47 and the average family size was 2.96.

In the county, the population was distributed as 24.40% under the age of 18, 9.10% from 18 to 24, 25.60% from 25 to 44, 23.20% from 45 to 64, and 17.70% who were 65 years of age or older. The median age was 39 years. For every 100 females, there were 103.30 males. For every 100 females age 18 and over, there were 103.00 males.

The median income for a household in the county was $29,583, and for a family was $35,293. Males had a median income of $26,421 versus $21,280 for females. The per capita income for the county was $15,475. About 12.60% of families and 15.60% of the population were below the poverty line, including 22.60% of those under age 18 and 10.40% of those age 65 or over.

== Communities ==
=== City ===
- Breckenridge (county seat)

=== Unincorporated communities ===
- Caddo
- Crystal Falls
- Eolian
- Frankell
- Gunsight
- Harpersville
- Ivan
- La Casa
- Necessity

== Notable people ==
- Jack Cox, businessman and politician
- Rupert N. Richardson, historian and president of Hardin-Simmons University

== Politics ==
Stephens County is a powerfully Republican county. In 2016, the Democrat for president, Hillary Clinton, received just 10% of the county's vote. The last Democrat to win the county in a presidential election was southerner Jimmy Carter, and the last Democrat to receive over 1,000 votes in the county was southerner Bill Clinton. The Democrat who has come closest to 1,000 votes since then is southerner Al Gore, who got 811 votes.

Stephens County is located within District 60 of the Texas House of Representatives. Stephens County is located within District 10 of the Texas Senate.

United States presidential election results for Stephens County, Texas
Year	Republican		Democratic		Third party(ies)	
Year	No.	%	No.	%	No.	%
1912	11	1.93%	462	80.91%	98	17.16%
1916	12	1.75%	572	83.26%	103	14.99%
1920	141	16.69%	643	76.09%	61	7.22%
1924	372	13.98%	2,184	82.07%	105	3.95%
1928	1,789	60.60%	1,163	39.40%	0	0.00%
1932	256	8.62%	2,684	90.40%	29	0.98%
1936	681	22.11%	2,380	77.27%	19	0.62%
1940	471	14.61%	2,750	85.32%	2	0.06%
1944	217	7.74%	2,104	75.04%	483	17.23%
1948	572	19.79%	2,132	73.77%	186	6.44%
1952	2,272	60.64%	1,471	39.26%	4	0.11%
1956	1,832	61.66%	1,126	37.90%	13	0.44%
1960	1,664	54.94%	1,357	44.80%	8	0.26%
1964	1,119	38.94%	1,753	61.00%	2	0.07%
1968	1,287	42.18%	1,239	40.61%	525	17.21%
1972	2,259	76.73%	678	23.03%	7	0.24%
1976	1,621	47.27%	1,796	52.38%	12	0.35%
1980	2,161	59.89%	1,372	38.03%	75	2.08%
1984	2,898	73.27%	1,046	26.45%	11	0.28%
1988	2,342	60.45%	1,519	39.21%	13	0.34%
1992	1,573	41.88%	1,115	29.69%	1,068	28.43%
1996	1,714	52.27%	1,218	37.15%	347	10.58%
2000	2,425	73.69%	811	24.64%	55	1.67%
2004	2,803	79.65%	703	19.98%	13	0.37%
2008	2,869	81.37%	626	17.75%	31	0.88%
2012	2,892	84.76%	475	13.92%	45	1.32%
2016	3,034	87.44%	348	10.03%	88	2.54%
2020	3,385	88.96%	397	10.43%	23	0.60%
2024	3,368	89.55%	384	10.21%	9	0.24%

United States Senate election results for Stephens County, Texas1
Year	Republican		Democratic		Third party(ies)	
Year	No.	%	No.	%	No.	%
2024	3,216	86.29%	450	12.07%	61	1.64%

United States Senate election results for Stephens County, Texas2
Year	Republican		Democratic		Third party(ies)	
Year	No.	%	No.	%	No.	%
2020	3,312	88.67%	374	10.01%	49	1.31%

Texas Gubernatorial election results for Stephens County
Year	Republican		Democratic		Third party(ies)	
Year	No.	%	No.	%	No.	%
2022	2,511	91.48%	217	7.91%	17	0.62%

== See also ==
- National Register of Historic Places listings in Stephens County, Texas
- Recorded Texas Historic Landmark in Stephens County
