= List of elections in 1957 =

The following elections occurred in the year 1957.

== Africa ==
- 1957 Egyptian parliamentary election
- 1957 Ethiopian general election
- 1957 Zanzibari general election

== Asia ==
- 1957 Egyptian parliamentary election
- 1957 Indonesian local elections
- 1957 Israeli presidential election
- 1957 Lebanese general election
- 1957 Malayan local elections
- 1957 Mongolian parliamentary election
- 1957 North Korean parliamentary election
- 1957 Philippine House of Representatives elections
- 1957 Singapore City Council election
- 1957 Taiwanese local elections
- February 1957 Thai general election
- December 1957 Thai general election
- 1957 Turkish general election
- 1957 Turkish presidential election
- 1957 Philippine general election:
  - 1957 Philippine presidential election
  - 1957 Philippine House of Representatives elections
  - 1957 Philippine Senate election

=== India ===
- 1957 Indian general election
- Indian general election in Madras, 1957
- 1957 Indian presidential election
- 1957 Indian vice presidential election
- 1957 Madras State legislative assembly election
- 1957 West Bengal state assembly election

== Europe ==
- 1957 Austrian presidential election
- 1957 Bulgarian parliamentary election
- 1957 Czechoslovak presidential election
- 1957 Danish parliamentary election
- 1957 Irish general election
- 1957 Liechtenstein general election
- 1957 Liechtenstein local elections
- 1957 Romanian parliamentary election
- 1957 Portuguese legislative election
- 1957 West German federal election
- 1957 Norwegian parliamentary election
- 1957 Polish legislative election
- 1957 Swiss referendums
- 1957 Turkish general election
- 1957 Turkish presidential election

=== United Kingdom ===
- 1957 Beckenham by-election
- 1957 Bristol West by-election
- 1957 Carmarthen by-election
- 1957 Edinburgh South by-election
- 1957 Hornsey by-election
- 1957 Ipswich by-election
- 1957 Lewisham North by-election
- 1957 Liverpool Garston by-election
- 1957 Warwick and Leamington by-election
- 1957 Wednesbury by-election

== North America ==
=== Canada ===
- 1957 Alberta liquor plebiscite
- 1957 Edmonton municipal election
- 1957 Canadian federal election
- 1957 Northwest Territories general election

=== Caribbean ===
- 1957 Dominican Republic general election
- 1957 Haitian presidential election

=== United States ===
- 1957 United States elections

==== United States lieutenant gubernatorial ====
- 1957 Virginia lieutenant gubernatorial election

==== United States gubernatorial ====
- 1957 New Jersey gubernatorial election
- 1957 United States gubernatorial elections
- 1957 Virginia gubernatorial election

==== United States House of Representatives ====
- 1957 United States House of Representatives elections

==== United States Senate ====
- 1957 United States Senate elections
- 1957 United States Senate special election in Texas
- 1957 United States Senate special election in Wisconsin

==== United States mayoral elections ====
- 1957 Cleveland mayoral election
- 1957 Hartford, Connecticut mayoral election
- 1957 Manchester, New Hampshire mayoral election
- 1957 New York City mayoral election
- 1957 Pittsburgh mayoral election
- 1957 Springfield, Massachusetts, mayoral election

== South America ==
- 1957 Argentine Constitutional Assembly election
- 1957 Chilean parliamentary election
- 1957 Guatemalan general election
- 1957 Honduran Constituent Assembly election
- 1957 Honduran presidential election
- 1957 Nicaraguan general election
- 1957 Venezuelan referendum

== Oceania ==
- 1957 New Zealand general election

=== Australia ===
- 1957 Burwood state by-election
- 1957 Kahibah state by-election
- 1957 Queensland state election
- 1957 Richmond by-election
- 1957 Vaucluse state by-election
- 1957 Wagga Wagga state by-election
- 1957 Wollondilly state by-election
