= 1959 United States elections =

- ← 1957 1958 1959 1960 1961 → Off-year elections

Senate elections
- Seats contested: 2
- Net seat change: 0

House elections
- Seats contested: 4
- Net seat change: 0

Gubernatorial elections
- Seats contested: 4
- Net seat change: Republican +1
- Democratic hold Republican gain

1959 United States elections included:

- Congressional elections
  - 1959 United States Senate elections in Hawaii
  - 1959 Iowa's 4th congressional district special election
  - 1959 Missouri's 4th congressional district special election
  - 1959 New York's 43rd congressional district special election
- Gubernatorial elections
  - 1959 Hawaii gubernatorial election
  - 1959 Kentucky gubernatorial election
  - 1959-60 Louisiana gubernatorial election
  - 1959 Mississippi gubernatorial election
- State elections
  - 1959 New Jersey Senate election
  - 1959 New York state election
- Referendums
  - Hawaii statehood referendum, held as part of the Hawaii Admission Act of 1959 for Hawaii on June 27, 1959 which was approved by voters. Later on August 21, 1959 President Eisenhower signed a proclamation admitting them as a state making them the 50th state.
- Mayoral elections
  - 1959 Baltimore mayoral election
  - 1959 Boston mayoral election
  - 1959 Chicago mayoral election
  - 1959 Cleveland mayoral election
  - 1959 Evansville, Indiana, mayoral election
  - 1959 Indianapolis mayoral election
  - 1959 Manchester, New Hampshire mayoral election
  - 1959 Philadelphia mayoral election
    - 1959 Pittsburgh mayoral special election
  - 1959 San Francisco mayoral election
  - 1959 Springfield, Massachusetts mayoral election
- Council, aldermanic, municipal and borough elections
  - 1959 Philadelphia municipal election

== See also ==
- 1959 United States House of Representatives elections
- 1959 United States Senate elections
- 1959 United States gubernatorial elections
