= 1957 United States Senate elections =

Democrat William Proxmire won a special election to fill the vacancy created by the death of Senator Joseph R. McCarthy (R-WI). Also, Price Daniel (D-TX) left the Senate to become governor of Texas, and Democrat Ralph Yarborough won a special election for that Senate seat. The Democrats thus made a net gain of one seat. However, Congress was out of session at the time of the Democratic gain in Wisconsin, and the Republicans gained a Democratic-held seat only weeks after the next session started, when Republican John D. Hoblitzell Jr. was appointed to fill the vacancy created by the death of Senator Matthew M. Neely (D-WV).

== Race summary ==
Ordered by election date.

State	Incumbent			Results	Candidates
State	Senator	Party	Electoral history	Results	Candidates
Texas (Class 1)	William A. Blakley	Democratic	1957 (Appointed)	Interim appointee retired when successor elected. New senator elected April 2, 1957. Democratic hold.	▌ ✓ Ralph Yarborough (Democratic) 38.1%; ▌Martin Dies Jr. (Democratic) 30.4%; ▌Thad Hutcheson (Republican) 22.9%
Wisconsin (Class 1)	Joseph McCarthy	Republican	1946; 1952	Incumbent died May 2, 1957. New senator elected August 28, 1957. Democratic gain.	▌ ✓ William Proxmire (Democratic) 56.4%; ▌Walter J. Kohler Jr. (Republican) 40.5%; ▌Howard J. Boyle (Constitution) 2.66%

== Texas ==
1957 United States Senate special election in Texas
- April 2, 1957
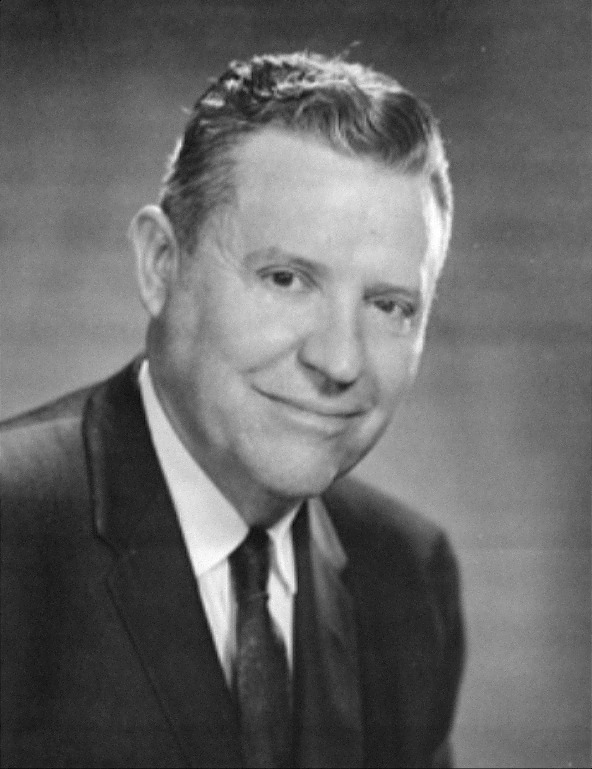

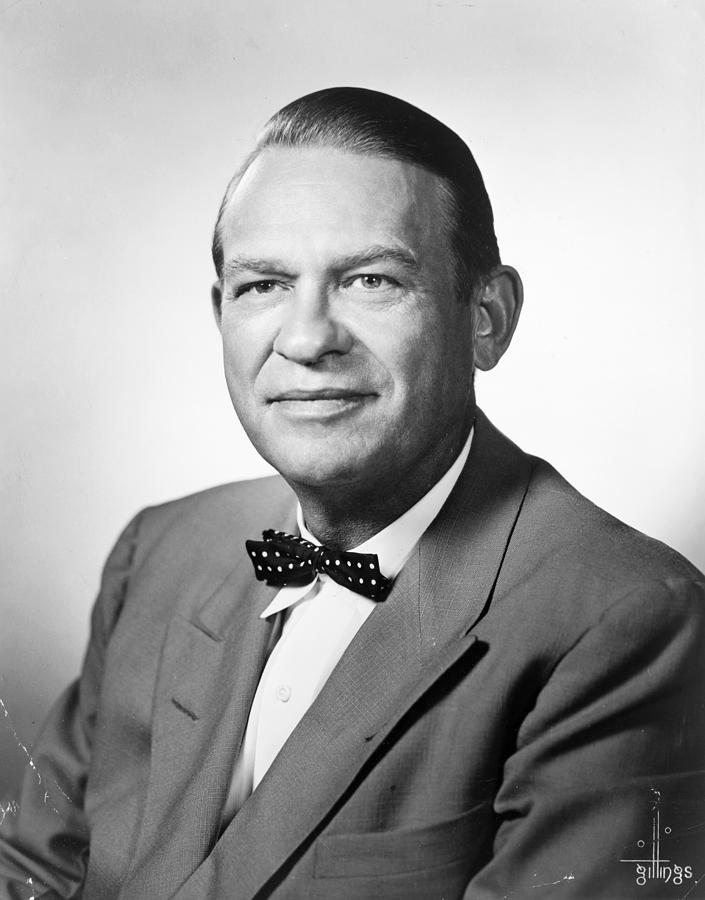

Nominee	Ralph Yarborough	Martin Dies Jr.	Thad Hutcheson
Party	Democratic	Democratic	Republican
Popular vote	364,605	290,803	219,591
Percentage	38.09%	30.38%	22.94%
- County Results; Yarborough: 30–40% 40–50% 50–60% 60–70% 70–80% 80–90% Dies: 20–30% 30–40% 40–50% 50–60% 60–70% 70–80% Hutcheson: 30–40% 40–50% 60–70% Tie: 30–40%
U.S. senator before election
William Blakley
Democratic
Elected U.S. Senator
Ralph Yarborough
Democratic

One-term Democrat Price Daniel resigned January 14, 1957 to become Governor of Texas. Daniel appointed Democrat William A. Blakley January 15, 1957. Blakley was an "Eisenhower Democrat" who had supported Dwight Eisenhower over the national Democratic Party candidate Adlai Stevenson in 1952 and 1956. He was initially mum about which party he would caucus with when he joined the Senate, but he announced he was remaining a Democrat when he was sworn in, allowing Democrats to maintain their majority in the narrowly-divided Senate.

Pressured by the Democratic Party in the interests of cooling tensions from the gubernatorial election, Blakley did not seek the remaining term as senator. He served for fewer than four months from January 15 to April 28. Ralph Yarborough succeeded him in the special election, winning with a plurality of the vote when the conservatives divided three ways. After the election, Texas law was changed to require a runoff between the two leading candidates in a special election if no candidate won a majority of the vote in the first round. Blakley left the Senate saying "I shall go back to my boots and saddle and ride toward the Western sunset."

Yarborough would be re-elected in 1958 and again in 1964.

Texas special election
Party	Candidate	Votes	%
Democratic	Ralph W. Yarborough	364,605	38.09%
Democratic	Martin Dies Jr.	290,803	30.38%
Republican	Thad Hutcheson	219,591	22.94%
Democratic	Searcy Bracewell	33,384	3.49%
Democratic	James P. Hart	19,739	2.06%
Democratic	John C. White	11,876	1.24%
Democratic	Ralph W. Hammonds	2,372	0.25%
Democratic	Elmer Adams	2,228	0.23%
Democratic	M. T. Banks	2,153	0.23%
Democratic	Frank G. Cortez	1,350	0.14%
Democratic	Charles W. Hill	1,025	0.11%
Democratic	Jacob Bergolofsky	890	0.09%
Democratic	J. Cal Courtney	879	0.09%
Democratic	Hugh Wilson	851	0.09%
Majority		73,802	7.71%
Turnout			12.41% (total pop)
Democratic hold			

== Wisconsin ==
Two-term Republican Joseph McCarthy died May 2, 1957. In the summer of 1957, a special election was held to fill McCarthy's seat. In the primaries, voters in both parties turned away from McCarthy's legacy. The Republican primary was won by Walter J. Kohler Jr., who called for a clean break from McCarthy's approach; he defeated former Congressman Glenn Robert Davis, who charged that Eisenhower was soft on Communism. The Democratic candidate, William Proxmire, called the late McCarthy "a disgrace to Wisconsin, to the Senate, and to America". On August 27, Proxmire won the election, serving in the seat for 32 years.

Proxmire would be re-elected five more times, serving until his retirement in 1989.

1957 United States Senate special election in Wisconsin
- August 27, 1957
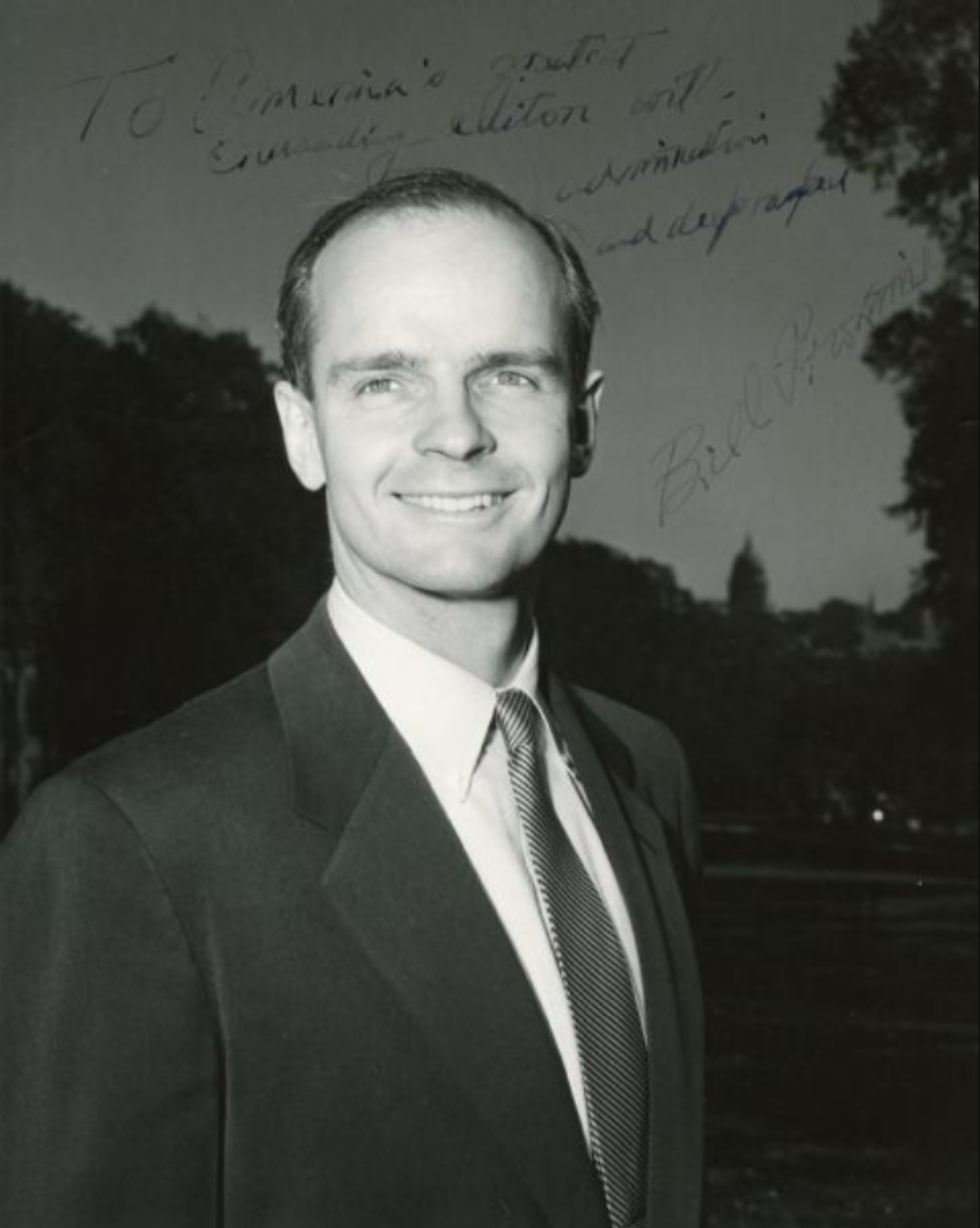

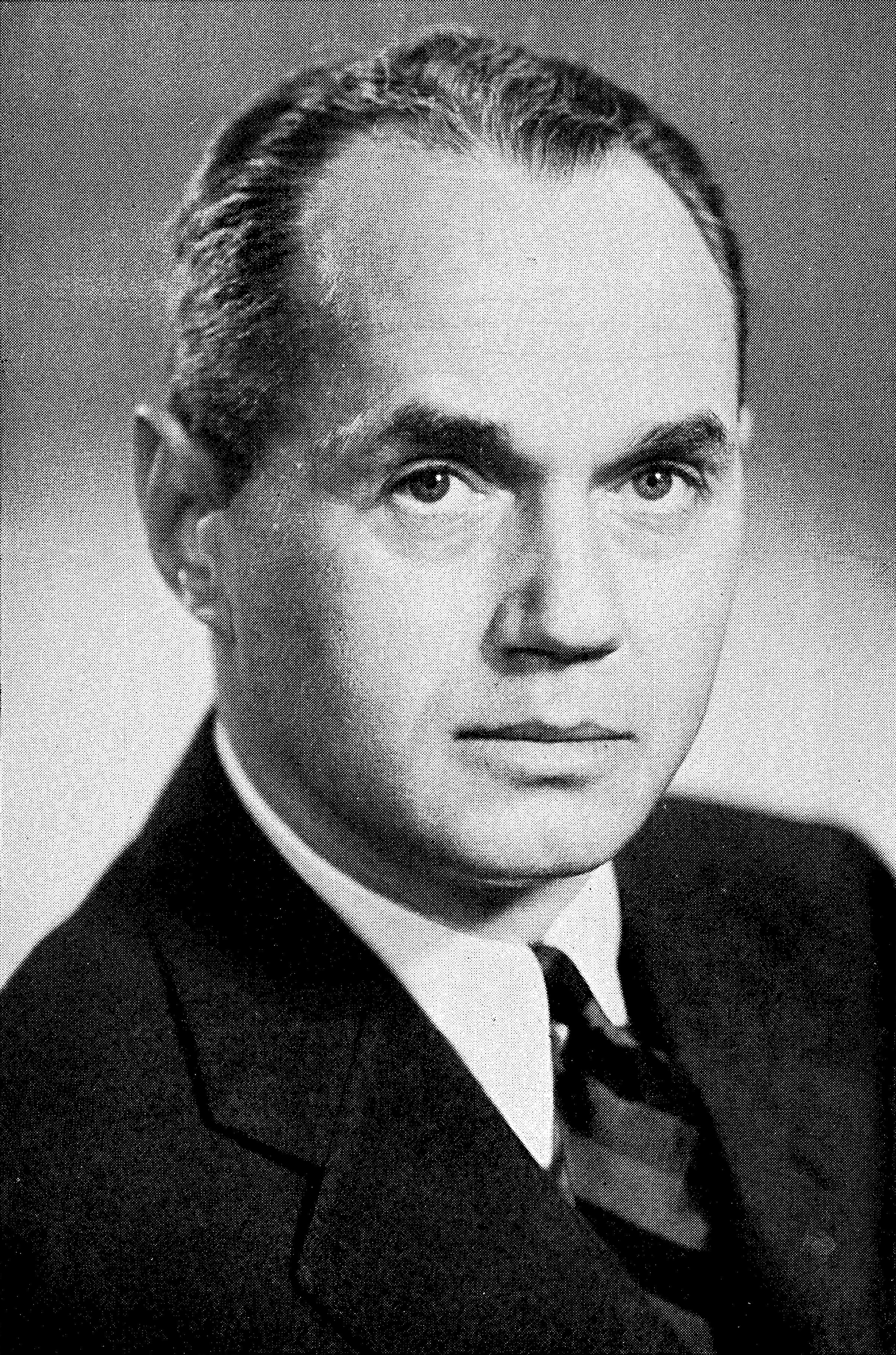
Nominee	William Proxmire	Walter Kohler
Party	Democratic	Republican
Popular vote	435,985	312,931
Percentage	56.44%	40.51%
- County results Proxmire: 40–50% 50–60% 60–70% 70–80% Kohler: 40–50% 50–60%
U.S. senator before election
Joseph McCarthy
Republican
Elected U.S. Senator
William Proxmire
Democratic

Wisconsin Special U.S. Senate Election, 1957
Party	Candidate	Votes	%	±%
Democratic	William Proxmire	435,985	56.44%	+15.22%
Republican	Walter Kohler	312,931	40.51%	−18.08%
Constitution Party (United States, 1952)	Howard Boyle	20,581	2.66%	
Independent	Donald Wheaton	2,288	0.30%	
Socialist Labor	Georgia Cozzini	704	0.09%	
Majority		123,054	15.93%	
Turnout		772,489		
Democratic gain from Republican				

== See also ==
- 1957 United States House of Representatives elections
