= 1957 United States elections =

- ← 1955 1956 1957 1958 1959 → Off-year elections
- Election day: November 5

Senate elections
- Overall control: Democratic hold
- Seats contested: 2 of 96 seats (2 special elections)
- Net seat change: 1

House elections
- Overall control: Democratic hold
- Seats contested: 5 special elections
- Net seat change: 0

Elections in 1957 included:

- Senate
  - 1957 United States Senate special election in Texas
  - 1957 United States Senate special election in Wisconsin
- House
  - 1957 Illinois's 7th congressional district special election
  - 1957 New Jersey's 2nd congressional district special election
  - 1957 New Mexico's at-large congressional district special election
  - 1957 Pennsylvania's 13th congressional district special election
- Governors
  - 1957 New Jersey gubernatorial election
  - 1957 Virginia gubernatorial election
- Mayors
  - Los Angeles, CA
  - Manchester, NH
  - New York City, NY
  - Pittsburgh, PA
  - Springfield, MA

== See also ==
- 1957 United States mayoral elections
- 1957 United States gubernatorial elections
- 1957 United States House of Representatives elections
- 1957 United States Senate elections
