= List of elections in 1961 =

The following elections occurred in 1961.

== Africa ==
- 1961 French referendum on Algerian self-determination
- 1961 British Cameroons referendum
- 1961 Burundian legislative election
- 1961 Ethiopian general election
- 1961 Gabonese general election
- 1961 Guinean presidential election
- 1961 Kenyan legislative election
- 1961 Mauritanian presidential election
- 1961 Nyasaland general election
- 1961 Republic of the Congo presidential election
- 1961 Rwandan parliamentary election
- 1961 South African general election
- 1961 South African presidential election
- 1961 Southern Rhodesian constitution referendum
- 1961 Togolese general election
- 1961 Togolese constitutional referendum
- 1961 Ugandan general election
- January 1961 Zanzibari general election
- June 1961 Zanzibari general election

== Asia ==
- 1961 Jordanian general election
- 1961 Iranian legislative election
- 1961 Israeli legislative election
- 1961 Kuwaiti Constitutional Convention election
- 1961 Malayan local elections
- Philippines
  - 1961 Philippine House of Representatives elections
  - 1961 Philippine Senate election
  - 1961 Philippine general election
  - 1961 Philippine presidential election
- 1961 South Vietnamese presidential election
- 1961 Syrian parliamentary election
- 1961 Syrian presidential election
- 1961 Turkish general election
- 1961 Turkish presidential election
- 1961 Turkish constitutional referendum

== Australia ==
- 1961 Australian federal election
- 1961 Liverpool Plains state by-election
- 1961 New South Wales referendum
- 1961 Paddington-Waverley state by-election
- 1961 Victorian state election

== Europe ==
- 1961 Belgian general election
- 1961 Danish electoral age referendum
- France:
  - 1961 French cantonal elections
  - French referendum on Algerian self-determination, 1961
- 1961 West German federal election
- 1961 Greek legislative election
- 1961 Irish general election
- Italy: 1961 Sardinian regional election
- 1961 Norwegian parliamentary election
- 1961 Polish legislative election
- 1961 Portuguese legislative election
- 1961 Romanian legislative election
- Turkey:
  - 1961 Turkish constitutional referendum
  - 1961 Turkish general election
  - 1961 Turkish presidential election
  - 1961 Turkish Senate election
- United Kingdom:
- 1961 Birmingham Small Heath by-election
- 1961 Bristol South East by-election
- 1961 Cambridgeshire by-election
- 1961 Colchester by-election
- 1961 East Fife by-election
- 1961 Glasgow Bridgeton by-election
- 1961 High Peak by-election
  - 1961 Labour Party leadership election
  - 1961 Labour Party deputy leadership election
  - 1961 London County Council election
- 1961 Manchester Moss Side by-election
- 1961 Oswestry by-election
- 1961 Paisley by-election
- 1961 Warrington by-election
- 1961 Worcester by-election
- 1961 United Kingdom local elections

== Americas ==
=== Canada ===
- Canada:
  - 1961 Edmonton municipal election
  - 1961 New Democratic Party leadership election
  - 1961 Progressive Conservative Party of Ontario leadership election
  - 1961 Yukon general election

=== United States ===
==== United States lieutenant gubernatorial ====
- 1961 Virginia lieutenant gubernatorial election

==== United States gubernatorial ====
- 1961 New Jersey gubernatorial election
- 1961 United States gubernatorial elections
- 1961 Virginia gubernatorial election

==== United States House of Representatives ====
- 1961 United States House of Representatives elections

==== United States Senate ====
- 1961 United States Senate special election in Texas

==== United States mayoral elections ====
- 1961 Auburn, Alabama municipal elections
- 1961 Cleveland mayoral election
- 1961 Dallas mayoral election
- 1961 Los Angeles mayoral election
- 1961 Manchester, New Hampshire mayoral election
- 1961 New York City mayoral election
- 1961 Pittsburgh mayoral election
- 1961 Springfield, Massachusetts, mayoral election

=== Caribbean ===
- 1961 Salvadoran Constitutional Assembly election
- 1961 Guatemalan parliamentary election
- 1961 Haitian parliamentary election
- 1961 Haitian presidential referendum
- 1961 Montserratian general election
- 1961 Trinidad and Tobago general election

=== South America ===
- 1961 Chilean parliamentary election
- 1961 Mexican legislative election

== Oceania ==
=== Australia ===
- 1961 Australian federal election
- 1961 Liverpool Plains state by-election
- 1961 New South Wales referendum
- 1961 Paddington-Waverley state by-election
- 1961 Victorian state election
