= 1960 United States elections =

- ← 1958 1959 1960 1961 1962 → Presidential election year
- Election day: November 8
- Incumbent president: ▌Dwight D. Eisenhower (R)
- Next Congress: 87th

Presidential election
- Partisan control: Democratic gain
- Popular vote margin: Democratic +0.2%
- Electoral vote
- John F. Kennedy (D): 303
- Richard Nixon (R): 219
- 1960 presidential election results. Red denotes states won by Nixon, blue denotes states won by Kennedy, and light blue denotes the electoral votes for Harry F. Byrd. Numbers indicate the electoral votes won by each candidate.

Senate elections
- Overall control: Democratic hold
- Seats contested: 35 of 100 seats (33 Class 2 seats + 3 special elections)
- Net seat change: Republican +2
- 1960 Senate results Republican gain Democratic hold Republican hold No election

House elections
- Overall control: Democratic hold
- Seats contested: All 437 voting members
- Popular vote margin: Democratic +10%
- Net seat change: Republican +22
- 1960 House of Representatives results Democratic gain Republican gain Democratic hold Republican hold No election

Gubernatorial elections
- Seats contested: 27
- Net seat change: Democratic +1
- 1960 gubernatorial election results Democratic gain Republican gain Democratic hold Republican hold No election

Elections were held on November 8, 1960, and elected the members of the 87th United States Congress. Democratic Senator John F. Kennedy narrowly defeated Republican incumbent Vice President Richard Nixon in the presidential election, and although Republicans made gains in both chambers of Congress, the Democratic Party easily maintained control of Congress. Democrat Lyndon B. Johnson ran for both Vice President and Senator from Texas, the last running mate to run for Vice President and reelection to the Senate until Lloyd Bentsen, and Johnson led the Senate Democratic Caucus through the Senate races.

In the presidential election, Democratic Senator John F. Kennedy from Massachusetts defeated sitting Republican Vice President Richard Nixon. Kennedy carried a mix of Southern, Midwestern, and Northeastern states, while Nixon dominated the Western United States and won a majority of states. Fourteen unpledged electors from Alabama and Mississippi voted for Democratic Senator Harry F. Byrd from Virginia, as many Southern Democrats opposed the national party's stance on civil rights. Kennedy's popular vote margin of victory was the closest in any presidential election in the 20th century, with Kennedy garnering 0.17% more of the popular vote than his opponent. Nixon, the first sitting vice president to win either party's nomination since John C. Breckinridge in 1860, easily won his party's nomination. Sitting Republican President Dwight D. Eisenhower was the first president in American history to be legally ineligible for re-election, due to the 1951 ratification of the 22nd Amendment. Kennedy won the Democratic nomination on the first ballot, defeating Texas Senator Lyndon B. Johnson. Kennedy's general election victory made him the first Catholic president.

This was the second consecutive election cycle in which the winning presidential candidate did not have coattails in either house of Congress.

== See also ==
- 1960 United States presidential election
- 1960 United States House of Representatives elections
- 1960 United States Senate elections
- 1960 United States gubernatorial elections
