= Joseph C. Hutcheson =

American politician (1842–1924)

Joseph Chappell Hutcheson
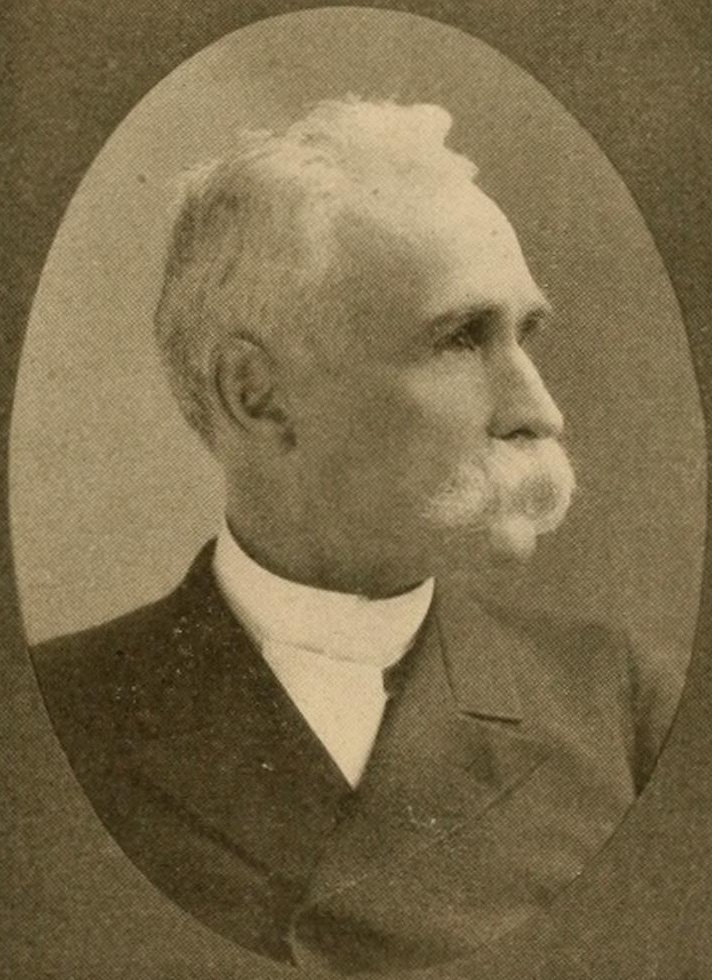

Member of the U.S. House of Representatives from Texas's 1st district
- In office March 4, 1893 – March 3, 1897
- Preceded by: Charles Stewart
- Succeeded by: Thomas H. Ball

Personal details
- Born: May 18, 1842 Boydton, Virginia, U.S.
- Died: May 25, 1924 (aged 82) Signal Mountain, Tennessee, U.S.
- Resting place: Glenwood Cemetery; Houston, Texas
- Party: Democratic
- Children: Joseph Chappell Hutcheson Jr.
- Relatives: Thad Hutcheson (grandson)

Military service
- Allegiance: Confederate States of America
- Branch/service: Confederate States Army
- Unit: 14th Virginia Infantry
- Battles/wars: American Civil War

Joseph Chappell Hutcheson, Sr. (May 18, 1842 – May 25, 1924), was a Texas politician and a Democratic member of the Texas House of Representatives and the United States House of Representatives.

== Biography ==
Hutcheson was born near Boydton, Virginia on May 18, 1842. He attended the local schools, and graduated from Randolph-Macon College in 1861.

He enlisted in the Confederate States Army for the American Civil War, joining the 21st Virginia Infantry Regiment as a private. He served throughout the war and rose to the rank of captain as commander of Company E, 14th Virginia Infantry.

After the war Hutcheson attended the University of Virginia School of Law, from which he graduated in 1866. He moved to Anderson, Texas, was admitted to the bar, and began to practice. In 1874 Hutcheson moved to Houston, Texas, where he continued to practice law.

A Democrat, he served in the Texas House of Representatives in 1880. In 1892 he was elected to represent Texas's 1st congressional district in the United States House of Representatives, and he was reelected in 1894. Hutcheson served in the 53rd and 54th Congresses, (March 4, 1893 to March 3, 1897). He did not run for reelection in 1896, and resumed the practice of law in Houston.

Hutcheson died at his summer home on Signal Mountain, near Chattanooga, Tennessee on May 25, 1924. He was buried at Glenwood Cemetery in Houston.

His son, Joseph Chappell Hutcheson Jr., was a Mayor of Houston and a federal judge.

A grandson, Thad Hutcheson, also a Houston lawyer, was a Republican candidate in the 1957 special election for United States Senator, and was defeated by Democrat Ralph Yarborough. Thad Hutcheson also served as chairman of the Texas GOP.

U.S. House of Representatives
Preceded by Charles Stewart	Member of the U.S. House of Representatives from Texas's 1st congressional district 1893–1897	Succeeded by Thomas H. Ball
