= 1958 French cantonal elections =

← 1955
- April 20, 1958 (1st round)
- April 27, 1958 (2nd round)
1961 →
- Turnout: 96.3%

Cantonal elections to renew the general councillors of cantons were held in France on 20 and 27 April 1958.

== Results ==
In the context of a governmental crisis linked to the Algerian War, these elections highlighted the continued decline of the French Communist Party since the Hungarian uprising of 1956. Both the Radicals, following the failure of Mendésism, and the Gaullists lost voter support. The victory primarily went to the Popular Republican Movement (MRP).

Party	Votes	%	Seats
Moderates and Independents	1,802,691	24.79	522
Rally of Republican Lefts	1,172,968	16.13	387
French Section of the Workers' International	1,355,705	18.64	267
Popular Republican Movement	813,699	11.19	147
Miscellaneous left	214,637	2.95	74
Social Republicans	272,534	3.75	60
French Communist Party	1,316,701	18.11	50
Far-left	84,512	1.16	7
Miscellaneous	40,725	0.56	6
Union et fraternité française	168,636	2.32	3
Far-right	29,138	0.40	3
Total	7,271,946	100.00	1,526
Valid votes	7,271,946	69.73	
Invalid/blank votes	3,157,445	30.27	
Total votes	10,429,391	100.00	
Registered voters/turnout	10,830,431	96.30	
Source: Le Monde
