= 1961 Cleveland mayoral election =

Cleveland mayoral election, 1961
- November 6, 1961
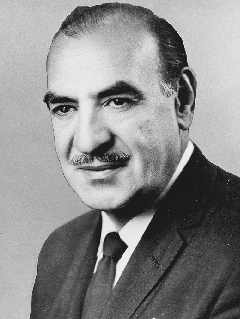

Nominee	Anthony J. Celebrezze	Albina Cermak
Party	Democratic	Republican
Popular vote	145,972	53,302
Percentage	73.25%	26.75%
Mayor before election
Anthony J. Celebrezze
Democratic
Elected mayor
Anthony J. Celebrezze
Democratic

The Cleveland mayoral election of 1961 saw the fourth re-election of incumbent mayor Anthony J. Celebrezze. His Republican opponent was Albina Cermak, the first woman to run for mayor of Cleveland.

== General election ==
1961 Cleveland mayoral election (general election)
Party	Candidate	Votes	%
Democratic	Anthony J. Celebrezze (incumbent)	145,972	73.25%
Republican	Albina Cermak	53,302	26.75%
Turnout		199,274	
