= 1958 United States Senate election in Texas =

- November 4, 1958
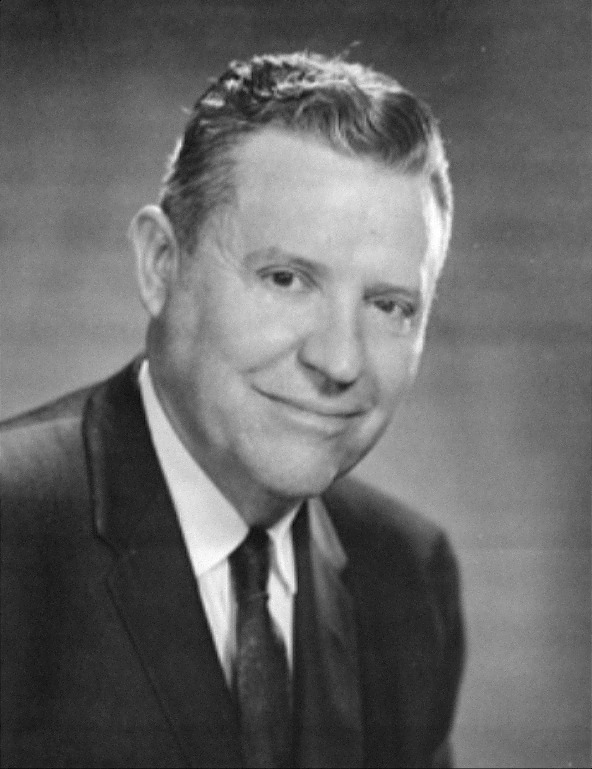

Nominee	Ralph Yarborough	Roy Whittenburg
Party	Democratic	Republican
Popular vote	587,030	185,926
Percentage	74.58%	23.62%
- County results Yarborough: 50–60% 60–70% 70–80% 80–90% >90% Whittenburg: 50–60% Tie: 50%
U.S. senator before election
Ralph Yarborough
Democratic
Elected U.S. Senator
Ralph Yarborough
Democratic

The 1958 United States Senate election in Texas was held on November 4, 1958. Incumbent Democratic U.S. Senator Ralph Yarborough won a competitive primary against former Senator William Blakley and handily defeated newspaper publisher Roy Whittenburg in the general election.

== Democratic primary ==
=== Candidates ===
- William Blakley, former interim Senator (1957)
- Ralph Yarborough, incumbent Senator since 1957

=== Results ===
1958 Democratic U.S. Senate primary
Party	Candidate	Votes	%
Democratic	Ralph Yarborough (incumbent)	761,511	58.72%
Democratic	William Blakley	535,418	41.28%
Total votes		1,296,929	100.00%

== General election ==
=== Results ===
1958 United States Senate election in Texas
Party	Candidate	Votes	%
Democratic	Ralph Yarborough (incumbent)	587,030	74.58%
Republican	Roy Whittenburg	185,926	23.56%
Constitution	Bard A. Logan	14,172	1.80%
Total votes		787,128	100.0%
Democratic hold			

== See also ==
- 1958 United States Senate elections
