= 1959 United States gubernatorial elections =

- July 28, 1959 (HI); November 3, 1959 (KY and MS); April 19, 1960 (LA)

4 governorships
	Majority party	Minority party
Party	Democratic	Republican
Seats before	35	14
Seats after	35	15
Seat change	Steady	▲1
Seats up	3	0
Seats won	3	1
- Democratic hold Republican gain

United States gubernatorial elections were held in 1959, in four states. Kentucky, Louisiana and Mississippi hold their gubernatorial elections in odd numbered years, every 4 years, preceding the United States presidential election year. Hawaii held its first gubernatorial election on achieving statehood.

== Results ==
State	Incumbent	Party	Status	Opposing candidates
Hawaii (Held, 28 July 1959)	New state			William F. Quinn (Republican) 51.12% John A. Burns (Democratic) 48.66% David Kihei (Commonwealth) 0.22%
Kentucky	Happy Chandler	Democratic	Term-limited, Democratic victory	Bert Combs (Democratic) 60.56% John M. Robsion Jr. (Republican) 39.44%
Louisiana (Held, 19 April 1960)	Earl Long	Democratic	Term-limited, Democratic victory	Jimmie Davis (Democratic) 80.53% Francis Grevemberg (Republican) 17.00% Kent Courtney (States Rights) 2.47%
Mississippi	James P. Coleman	Democratic	Term-limited, Democratic victory	Ross Barnett (Democratic) unopposed in the general election. (Democratic primary run-off results); Ross Barnett 54.34% Carroll Gartin 45.66%
