= 1958 United States elections =

- ← 1956 1957 1958 1959 1960 → Midterm elections
- Election day: November 4
- Incumbent president: ▌Dwight D. Eisenhower (R)
- Next Congress: 86th

Senate elections
- Overall control: Democratic hold
- Seats contested: 36 of 98 seats (32 Class 1 seats + 2 special elections + 2 elections for Alaska)
- Net seat change: Democratic +15
- 1958 Senate election results% Democratic gain Democratic hold Republican hold

House elections
- Overall control: Democratic hold
- Seats contested: All 437 voting seats
- Popular vote margin: Democratic +12.4%
- Net seat change: Democratic +49

Gubernatorial elections
- Seats contested: 34
- Net seat change: Democratic +6
- 1958 gubernatorial election results Democratic gain Democratic hold Republican gain Republican hold

Elections were held on November 4, 1958, and elected members of the 86th United States Congress. The election took place in the middle of Republican President Dwight D. Eisenhower's second term. Eisenhower's party suffered large losses. They lost 48 seats to the Democratic Party in the House of Representatives, and also lost thirteen seats in the U.S. Senate to the Democrats. This marked the first time that the six-year itch phenomenon occurred during a Republican presidency since Ulysses S. Grant's second term in 1874. Alaska and Hawaii were admitted as states during the 86th Congress.

The ranks of liberal Democrats swelled as the Republican Party suffered several losses in the Northeast and the Western United States. The election contributed to a weakening of the conservative coalition and those opposed to the civil rights movement, allowing for the eventual passage of the Great Society and the Civil Rights Act of 1964. The election saw an influx of northern Democrats who sought to reform the Congressional seniority system, which often gave the best positions to senior southerners who rarely faced difficult re-elections and thus were able to rack up long terms of service.

== Alaska statehood ==
Alaska held a referendum that year on statehood, Proposition 1, which was approved. Two other related referendums were also held in Alaska that year: Proposition 2 asked whether or not to ratify the state boundaries, and Proposition 3 asked whether or not to approve other parts of the Alaska Statehood Act. Propositions 2 and 3 both passed.

== See also ==
- 1958 United States House of Representatives elections
- 1958 United States Senate elections
- 1958 United States gubernatorial elections
