= 1957 United States Senate special election in Texas =

- April 2, 1957
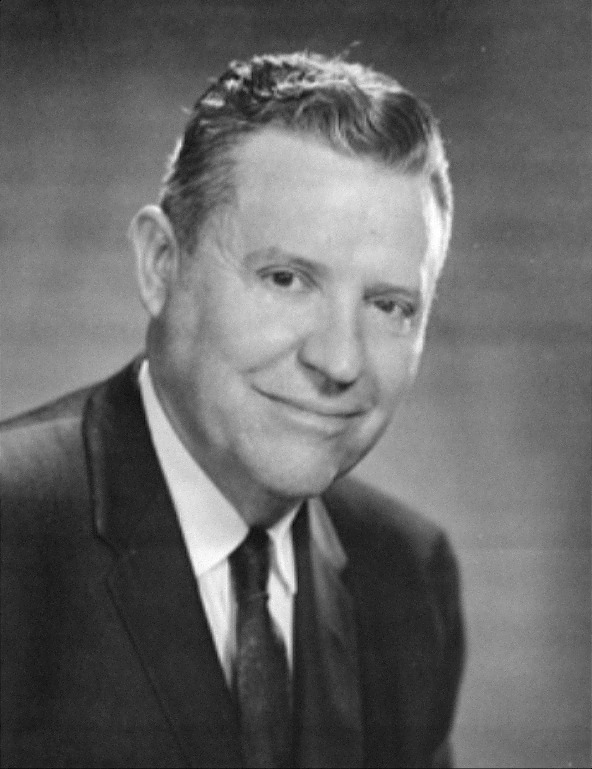

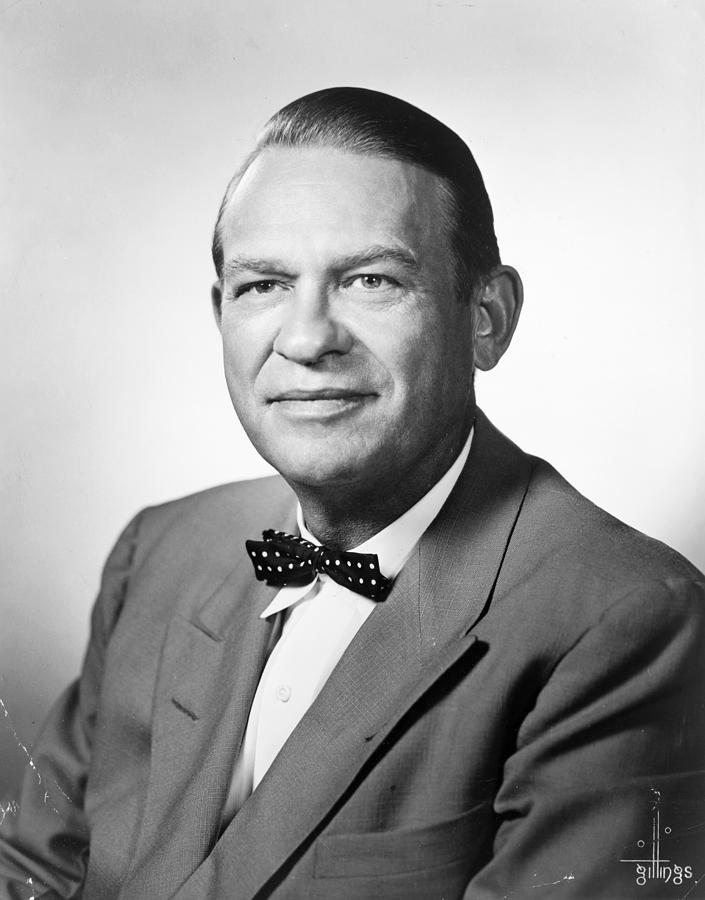

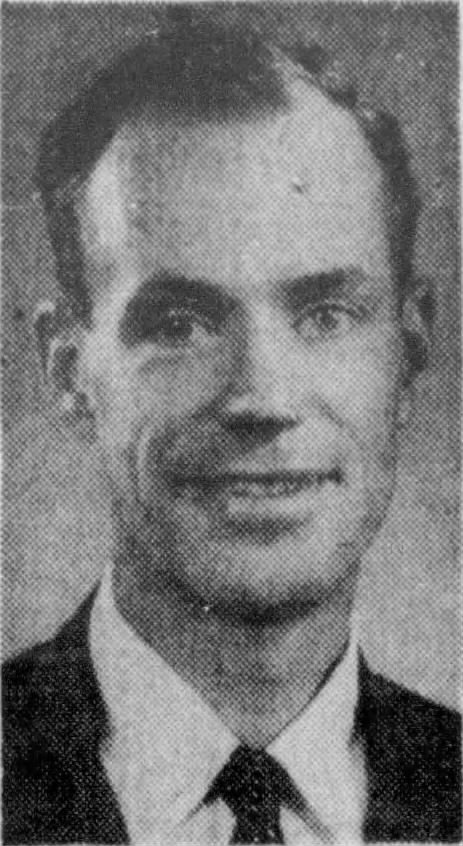
Nominee	Ralph Yarborough	Martin Dies Jr.	Thad Hutcheson
Party	Democratic	Democratic	Republican
Popular vote	364,605	290,803	219,591
Percentage	38.09%	30.38%	22.94%
- Yarborough: 30–40% 40–50% 50–60% 60–70% 70–80% 80–90% Dies: 20–30% 30–40% 40–50% 50–60% 60–70% 70–80% Hutcheson: 30–40% 40–50% 60–70% Tie: 30–40%
U.S. senator before election
William Blakley
Democratic
Elected U.S. Senator
Ralph Yarborough
Democratic

The 1957 United States Senate special election in Texas was held on April 2, 1957, to complete the unexpired term of Senator Price Daniel, who resigned to become Governor of Texas. Interim Senator William Blakley did not run in the special election. Ralph Yarborough won the race with a plurality of the vote; no majority was required.

== Background ==
In November 1956, incumbent senator Price Daniel was elected Governor of Texas. He had announced his resignation that September after winning the Democratic nomination, but it only became effective after he took office in January 1957. Outgoing Governor Allan Shivers appointed William Blakley to fill the seat until a successor could be elected. At the time of his appointment, Blakley was mum about which party he would vote with in the Senate; he had never held political office before. Soon after, he announced that he would serve as a Democrat, ensuring Democratic control in the narrowly divided Senate. The special election was scheduled for April 2. Blakley declined to run in the special election. The winner would finish Daniel's term ending in 1959.

== Candidates ==
=== Major candidates ===
- Searcy Bracewell (Democratic), state senator from Houston and President pro tempore of the Texas Senate
- Martin Dies Jr. (Democratic), U.S. Representative from Lufkin (representing Texas at-large)
- James P. Hart (Democratic), former justice of the Texas Supreme Court
- Thad Hutcheson (Republican), Houston attorney
- John Coyle White (Democratic), Texas Agriculture Commissioner since 1951
- Ralph Yarborough (Democratic), Travis County District Judge and candidate for governor in 1952, 1954, and 1956

=== Minor candidates ===
None of these candidates received more than 0.25% of the popular vote.

- Elmer Adams
- H.J. Antoine
- M. T. Banks
- Jacob Bergolofsky
- John C. Burns
- H. Frank Connally
- Frank G. Cortez
- J. Cal Courtney
- R. Waire Currin
- Charles O. Foerster Jr.
- Curtis Ford
- Charles W. Hill
- Walter S. McNutt
- J. Perrin Willis
- Hugh Wilson

== Campaign ==
At the time, Texas held its special elections in a nonpartisan fashion, where all candidates appeared on the ballot in alphabetical order regardless of party affiliation. This had allowed former senator W. Lee O'Daniel to win a previous special election in 1941 with a plurality of only 30% of the vote. The Democratic-controlled Texas Legislature introduced a bill in January to alter the election's rules to require a candidate to earn a majority of the vote to win, with a runoff being called if no candidate does so in the first round. Attorney Thad Hutcheson was the only major Republican candidate in the race, so Republicans saw the crowded Democratic field as an opportunity to win the seat with a plurality of the vote. As such, Republicans vehemently opposed the passage of the bill. Several East Texas county judges also opposed the bill due to the additional costs of holding a second election. Conservative Democrats argued that the bill was necessary to prevent a Republican takeover of the Senate, which had the potential to lead to the passage of civil rights legislation. Many saw the bill as an attempt to not only defeat Hutcheson, but also to defeat Ralph Yarborough, the only prominent liberal Democrat in the race. These efforts failed, however, as the Texas Senate did not give the bill the supermajority vote required for it to go into effect prior to the election.

The Democratic Party had won a 49–47 majority in the U.S. Senate in the 1956 elections, but a Republican victory in this election would have given Republicans control of the chamber through Vice President Richard Nixon's tiebreaking vote. Because of this, Republicans from across the country campaigned for Hutcheson, who drew the endorsements of Nixon and President Dwight Eisenhower. Most major Texas newspapers endorsed Martin Dies, but other prominent Texas Democrats like interim-Senator Blakley and Senate majority leader Lyndon Johnson did not endorse any candidate. Each candidate's views on regulations for the oil and gas industry emerged as a primary campaign issue. Republicans campaigned on President Eisenhower's inclusion of a natural gas bill in his budget for the year, while Democrats argued that they would be better at managing the industry, as both of their congressional leaders, Johnson and House Speaker Sam Rayburn, were from Texas.

== Results ==
Ralph Yarborough won the race with a plurality of 38% of the vote. The results mirrored several previous races Yarborough had participated in: conflicts between the liberal and conservative branches of the Democratic Party. Yarborough had previously run for governor and attorney general, and he had been defeated both times in the Democratic primary by conservative Democrats. Despite fears that the long list of Democratic candidates in the race would split the vote to allow the Republican Hutcheson to win, Dies emerged as the conservative Democratic frontrunner and placed second, with Hutcheson placing third. No other candidate won a significant portion of the vote. Yarborough's victory ensured that Democrats would maintain control of the U.S. Senate.

Yarborough became the second person since World War II to win election to the Senate with under 40% of the vote. Conservative Democrats decried his vote share for being even lower than his performances in his previous gubernatorial runs. They claimed that he had only won because of divisions in the conservative vote. At the same time, Hutcheson performed better than most previous Republican candidates for statewide office. After the election, the Texas Legislature approved the runoff requirement for special elections to the U.S. Senate. This requirement would first come into play in 1961, and then again in 1993.

1957 U.S. Senate special election
Party	Candidate	Votes	%
Democratic	Ralph W. Yarborough	364,605	38.09%
Democratic	Martin Dies Jr.	290,803	30.38%
Republican	Thad Hutcheson	219,591	22.94%
Democratic	Searcy Bracewell	33,384	3.49%
Democratic	James P. Hart	19,739	2.06%
Democratic	John C. White	11,876	1.24%
Various	Minor candidates	17,300	1.81%
Total votes		957,298	100.00%

== See also ==
- 1957 United States Senate elections
