= J. Marshall Brown =

American politician (1926–1995)

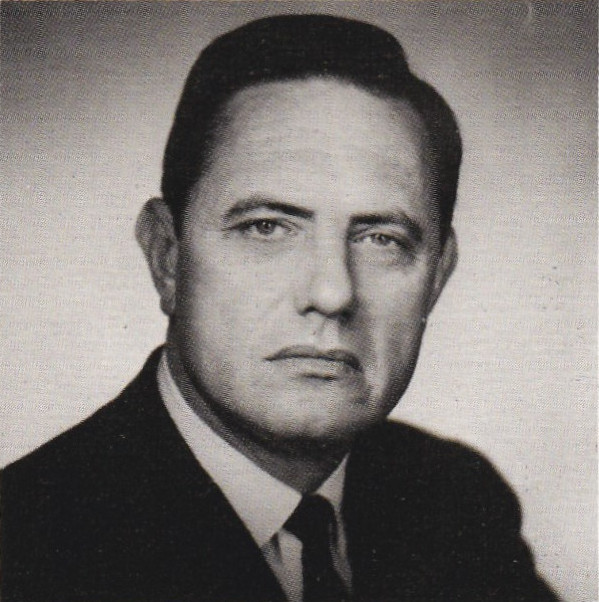
- Brown in 1970

Member of the Louisiana House of Representatives
- In office 1952–1960

Personal details
- Born: John Marshall Brown; October 3, 1926 Virginia, U.S.
- Died: August 5, 1995 (aged 68) Bush, Louisiana, U.S.
- Party: Democratic
- Education: Louisiana Polytechnic Institute; University of Louisiana at Lafayette

John Marshall Brown (October 3, 1926 – August 5, 1995) was an American politician. A member of the Democratic Party, he served in the Louisiana House of Representatives from 1952 to 1960.

== Life and career ==
Brown was born in Virginia. He served in the United States Navy during World War II, which after his discharge, he worked as an insurance agent in New Orleans, Louisiana.

Brown served in the Louisiana House of Representatives from 1952 to 1960. He lost his seat in the House, in 1959, when he ran as a Democratic candidate for governor of Louisiana. but withdrew due to health reasons, which after his withdrawal in the gubernatorial election, he attended Louisiana Polytechnic Institute and the University of Louisiana at Lafayette.

== Death and legacy ==
Brown died on August 5, 1995 in a traffic accident in Bush, Louisiana, at the age of 68.

In 2014, Brown was posthumously inducted into the Louisiana Political Museum and Hall of Fame.
