= 1955 French cantonal elections =

← 1951
- April 17, 1955 (1st round)
- April 24, 1955 (2nd round)
1958 →
- Turnout: 59.59%

Cantonal elections to renew the general councillors of cantons were held in France on April 17 and 24, 1955. Originally scheduled for October 1954, the cantonal elections were postponed and finally held in April 1955.

== Results ==
The abstention rate amounted to 40.41%. It was a victory for the moderates and the Rally of Republican Lefts (RGR).

A fairly general progression of the socialists was observed, while the communists retreated in some cantons. In most cases, the socialists allied (withdrawing candidates in favor of the better placed) with center and right-wing parties against the French Communist Party (PCF).

The Popular Republican Movement (MRP) maintained its positions in Western France and Alsace. The Gaullists (Social Republicans) found themselves in difficult positions.

In 13 cantons of Hérault, the election could not take place as the mayors staged a ballot box strike.

Party	First round		Second round		Seats
Party	Votes	%	Votes	%	Seats
Moderates and Independents	1,695,572	27.03	781,641	21.60	350
Rally of Republican Lefts	1,004,985	16.02	502,344	13.88	266
French Section of the Workers' International	1,113,400	17.75	794,123	21.95	144
Popular Republican Movement	560,438	8.94	308,050	8.51	63
Miscellaneous left	222,638	3.55	129,488	3.58	45
Social Republicans	346,081	5.52	283,957	7.85	31
French Communist Party	1,316,701	20.99	813,807	22.49	23
Miscellaneous	12,393	0.20	4,557	0.13	0
Total	6,272,208	100.00	3,617,967	100.00	922
Valid votes	6,272,208	97.19	3,617,967	97.53	
Invalid/blank votes	181,407	2.81	91,441	2.47	
Total votes	6,453,615	100.00	3,709,408	100.00	
Registered voters/turnout	10,830,431	59.59	6,017,063	61.65	
Source: Le Monde
