= Charles Stewart (Harris County politician) =

American politician

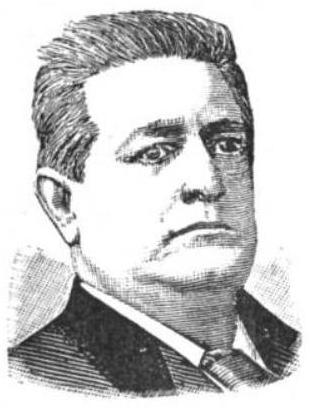

Member of the U.S. House of Representatives from Texas's 1st district
- In office March 4, 1883 – March 3, 1893
- Preceded by: John H. Reagan
- Succeeded by: Joseph C. Hutcheson

Personal details
- Born: May 30, 1836 Memphis, Tennessee, U.S.
- Died: September 21, 1895 (aged 59) San Antonio, Texas, U.S.
- Party: Democratic
- Occupation: Lawyer

Military service
- Allegiance: Confederate States of America
- Branch/service: Army

Charles Stewart (May 30, 1836 – September 21, 1895) was a U.S. representative from Texas.

== Biography ==
Born in Memphis, Tennessee, Stewart moved to Texas in 1845 with his parents, who settled in Galveston. He attended the common schools, and later studied law. He was admitted to the bar in 1854 and commenced the practice of law in Marlin, Texas. He served as prosecuting attorney for the thirteenth judicial district from 1856 to 1860. He served as delegate to the secession convention in 1861.

Stewart enlisted in the Confederate States Army and served throughout the Civil War, first in the Tenth Regiment of Texas Infantry and later in Baylor's Cavalry. He moved to Houston in 1866 and resumed the practice of law. He was city attorney of Houston 1874–1876. He served as member of the Texas Senate from 1878 to 1882.

Stewart was elected as a Democrat to the Forty-eighth and to the four succeeding Congresses (March 4, 1883 – March 3, 1893). He was not a candidate for renomination in 1892. He resumed the practice of his profession in Houston, Texas. He died in San Antonio, Texas, September 21, 1895. He was interred in Glenwood Cemetery, Houston, Texas.

U.S. House of Representatives
Preceded by John H. Reagan	Member of the U.S. House of Representatives from Texas's 1st congressional district 1883–1893	Succeeded by Joseph C. Hutcheson
