= Albina Cermak =

American politician (1904–1978)

Albina Cermak (April 4, 1904 – December 22, 1978) was an American politician, the first woman to run for mayor of Cleveland.

== Early life ==
Albina Cermak was of Czech ancestry and was born on April 4, 1904 in Cleveland, Ohio to Frank J. and Rose Cermak. Albina Cermak was raised on Cleveland's West Side in a political household. Her father was a member of the Republican Party and her mother was a suffragette. Her childhood home was on Cliff Drive near Edgewater Park. She could see the downtown skyline and Lake Erie from her home.

Prior to engaging with politics, Cermak was in nursing school for a period of time before dropping out of school and becoming a bookkeeper-secretary-buyer of Cermak Dry Goods Co. In 1933, she became the bookkeeper for the public utilities department in Cleveland. Within two years, she was promoted to supervisor.

== Political career ==
Prior to running for mayor in 1961, there were not many examples of women running for mayor, and the women who did run for mayor did so in small cities. Cermak was one of the first woman to launch a mayoral campaign in a large city. In 1961, she ran against incumbent Anthony Celebrezze who had been mayor since 1953. Cermak believed that Celebrezze was not the right person for the job and she argued that his campaign caused damage to Cleveland's economy.

Cermak was a Republican just like her father, and she was running in a mostly Democratic city. She ran her campaign following World War II, which brought an "urban crisis" to Cleveland. This once prosperous industrial city no longer saw the same demand for its industries post war. Cermak felt that Cleveland business and political leaders failed to meet the challenges posed by the "urban crisis." Therefore, she campaigned on the promise that she would appoint responsible people to positions in power to combat the crisis. Cermak advocated to bringing industry back and using code enforcement in slum areas. She also focused on pollution and a reliable transportation system. Despite her campaign promises, she lost the 1961 mayoral election to Anthony Celebrezze. Many today state that her ideas were ahead of their time.

In addition to running for mayor of Cleveland, Cermak served as a Republican precinct committeewoman, chair of Republican Women's Organization of Cuyahoga County, Board of Elections member, and Republican National Convention delegate. She also became U.S. collector of customs in 1953. In addition, she was the first woman appointed bailiff to the common pleas court in 1964. In 1965, the Ohio state auditor Roger Cloud made her an administrative specialist and in 1966 Governor Jas. Rhodes made her the vice-chairwoman of the Ohio Status of Women Committee.
