= 1961 Dallas mayoral election =

- April 4, 1961
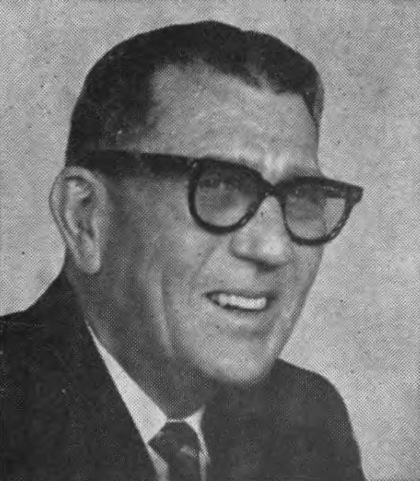

Candidate	Earle Cabell	Joe Geary	George T. Fox, Jr.
Party	Nonpartisan	Nonpartisan	Nonpartisan
Popular vote	41,468	38,725	2,015
Percentage	50.44%	47.11%	2.45%
Mayor before election
Robert L. Thornton
Elected mayor
Earle Cabell

The 1961 Dallas mayoral election was held on April 4, 1961.

== Results ==
1961 Dallas mayoral election
Party	Candidate	Votes	%
Nonpartisan	Earle Cabell	41,468	50.44%
Nonpartisan	Joe Geary	38,725	47.11%
Nonpartisan	George T. Fox, Jr.	2,015	2.45%
Total votes		82,208	100%
