= Thad Hutcheson =

American lawyer (1915–1986)

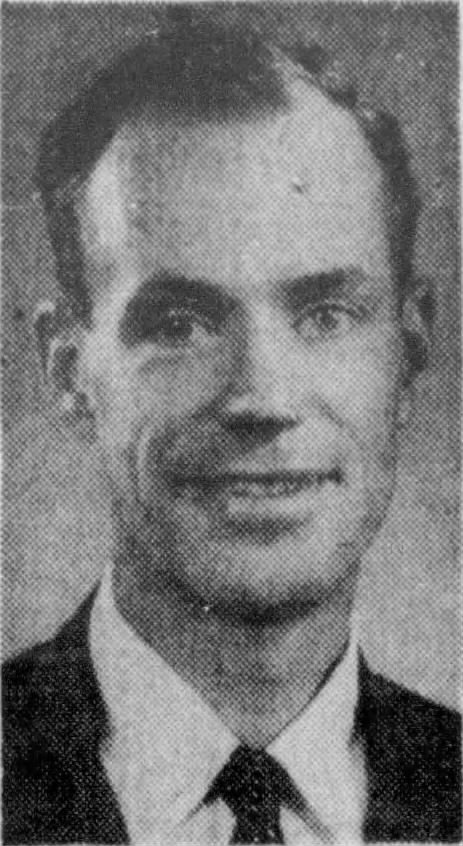

Chair of the Texas Republican Party
- In office May 9, 1957 – December 31, 1960
- Preceded by: John Q. Adams
- Succeeded by: Tad Smith

Personal details
- Born: Thaddeus Thomson Hutcheson; October 29, 1915 Houston, Texas, U.S.
- Died: August 3, 1986 (aged 70) Houston, Texas, U.S.
- Resting place: Glenwood Cemetery in Houston
- Party: Republican (1951–1986)
- Other political affiliations: Democratic (before 1951)
- Spouse: Caroline Brownlee Hutcheson
- Relations: Grandfather Joseph Chappell Hutcheson; Uncle Joseph Chappell Hutcheson, Jr.
- Children: 5
- Education: Princeton University; University of Texas School of Law
- Occupation: Lawyer

Thaddeus Thomson Hutcheson (October 29, 1915 – August 3, 1986), was a Republican attorney in his native Houston, who was an early figure in the movement to establish a competitive two-party system in the U.S. state of Texas.

== Background ==
Born to a wealthy family, Hutcheson was the grandson of Joseph C. Hutcheson, a Virginia native who served from Houston as a Democrat in the Texas House of Representatives and the United States House of Representatives from 1893 to 1897 from Texas's 1st congressional district. Thad Hutcheson was the middle of three sons of the attorney William Palmer "Pam" Hutcheson, Sr., and the former Eleanor Lee Thomson. Like his father, Hutcheson was educated at the private boarding school, The Hill School in Pottstown in Montgomery County near Philadelphia, Pennsylvania. Hutcheson graduated in 1937 from Princeton University in Princeton, New Jersey. He received his legal education from the University of Texas School of Law at Austin. He was married to the former Caroline Brownlee, an Austin native, and the couple had five children: Thaddeus T. Hutcheson, Jr. (born March 2, 1941), Houghton B. Hutcheson (born August 27, 1946), John Palmer Hutcheson and Thomas Taliaferro Hutcheson (twins born October 14, 1948), and Lucy Hutcheson Barrow (born October 20, 1959.)

Following service in the U.S. Navy in World War II as a Lieutenant Commander assigned to the Destroyer Escort U.S.S. Swasey, Hutcheson entered the practice of law in Houston with his father, older brother, Palmer Hutcheson, Jr., and cousin, Thomas Taliaferro. The firm was known at its founding as Hutcheson, Taliaferro & Hutcheson, and was subsequently known as Hutcheson and Grundy.

== Political life ==
Hutcheson began his early life as a Democrat, but in 1951 became a Taft Republican. Hutcheson spoke at the 1952 Republican National Convention in Chicago, Illinois, which nominated the Eisenhower-Nixon ticket. In 1957, when U.S. Senator Price Daniel vacated his seat to become governor of Texas, Hutcheson was the Republican candidate in the special election to choose a successor. At the time, the plurality winner automatically filled the Senate vacancy. Hutcheson ran third with 23 percent of the vote. Victory in the Senate election went to Daniel's gubernatorial primary runoff opponent, Ralph Yarborough, the Democrat who received 38 percent of the ballots cast. In second place with 30 percent of the vote was conservative Democratic U.S. Representative Martin Dies, Jr., known for his House investigations into communist subversion.

Hutcheson was so highly regarded in Texas GOP circles that when a second U.S. Senate vacancy arose in 1961, as Lyndon B. Johnson resigned to become Vice President of the United States, some party leaders encouraged Hutcheson to run again, but he declined. John Tower, a Republican political science instructor at Midwestern State University In Wichita Falls, entered the special election. Tower had received 41 percent of the vote in November 1960 in the regular general election against Senator Johnson. who sought both reelection and the vice presidency under special state legislation. Tower went on to win the special election by a narrow margin over appointed conservative Democrat William Blakley. This time, a runoff—between Tower and Blakley—was required under revised state law to guarantee a majority-vote winner. Ironically, Blakley, a wealthy Dallas businessman, had held the Daniel Senate vacancy for three months in 1957 but did not run for the position at that time. Tower in 1961 became the first Republican senator from Texas since the 19th century and served ultimately nearly twenty-four years. Since Tower retired from the Senate in January 1985, his former seat has remained continuously in Republican hands, a testimony to Hutcheson's vision for his party from decades past.

Hutcheson was a delegate to the 1956 and the 1960 Republican National Conventions. He was chairman of the Texas Republican Party from May 9, 1957 until December 31, 1960 and did not run for public office after the 1957 special Senate race.

The annual moot court competition for first-year students at the UT Law School is named for Hutcheson.

Hutcheson, his wife, and most other family members are interred at Glenwood Cemetery in Houston.

Party political offices
Preceded by Price Daniel	Republican nominee for U.S. Senator from Texas (Class 1); 1957	Succeeded by Roy Whittenburg
