= J. Searcy Bracewell Jr. =

American politician (1918–2003)

Searcy Bracewell

President pro tempore of the Texas Senate
- In office October 14, 1957 – November 13, 1957
- Preceded by: Carlos Ashley
- Succeeded by: William T. Moore

Member of the Texas Senate
- In office January 11, 1949 – January 13, 1959
- Preceded by: Maribelle Stewart
- Succeeded by: Robert W. Baker
- Constituency: 16th district (1949–1953); 6th district (1953–1959)

Member of the Texas House of Representatives
- In office January 14, 1947 – January 11, 1949

Personal details
- Born: Joseph Searcy Bracewell Jr. January 19, 1918 Houston, Texas, U.S.
- Died: May 13, 2003 (aged 85) Houston, Texas, U.S.
- Political party: Democratic
- Spouse: Elizabeth Weaver
- Education: Texas A&M College

Military service
- Allegiance: United States
- Branch/service: United States Army
- Rank: Major
- Battles/wars: World War II; European theater

Joseph Searcy Bracewell Jr. (January 19, 1918 – May 13, 2003), was a Texas Democratic politician and founder of the law firm Bracewell LLP, based in Houston. He served as both a member of the Texas House of Representatives and the Texas Senate from Houston. He was the Texas Senate President Pro Tempore in 1957.

A state House member from 1947 to 1949 and a senator from 1949 to 1959, Bracewell wrote bills establishing what later became the M.D. Anderson Cancer Center and the University of Texas Health Science Center Dental School. In 1957, he waged an unsuccessful campaign for the U.S. Senate in a special election against Ralph Yarborough for the right to finish the elected term of then Governor Price Daniel.

In 1945, Bracewell, his father, his brother, and a future state district judge joined to form the precursor of the firm that became Bracewell & Giuliani when former New York City Mayor Rudolph W. Giuliani joined the group in March 2005.

Bracewell served in World War II on the staff of General George S. Patton. He was president and board chairman of the Houston Grand Opera, interim president of the South Texas College of Law, board chairman of the visitors of Texas A&M University at Galveston. He was named Outstanding Houston Aggie in 1978.

Preceded by Carlos C. Ashley Sr.	Texas Senate President Pro Tempore; 1957	Succeeded by William T. "Bill" Moore
