= 1959 Cleveland mayoral election =

Ohio State mayoral election

Cleveland mayoral election, 1959
- November 3, 1959
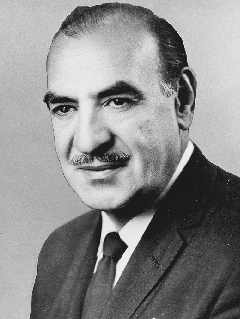

Nominee	Anthony J. Celebrezze	Tom Ireland
Party	Democratic	Republican
Popular vote	138,980	60,815
Percentage	69.56%	30.44%
Mayor before election
Anthony J. Celebrezze
Democratic
Elected mayor
Anthony J. Celebrezze
Democratic

The Cleveland mayoral election of 1959 saw the third re-election of incumbent mayor Anthony J. Celebrezze.

== General election ==
1959 Cleveland mayoral election (general election)
Party	Candidate	Votes	%
Democratic	Anthony J. Celebrezze (incumbent)	138,980	69.56%
Republican	Tom Ireland	60,815	30.44%
Turnout		199,795	
