= 1957 Virginia lieutenant gubernatorial election =

- November 5, 1957
Nominee	Allie Edward Stakes Stephens	Horace E. Henderson
Party	Democratic	Republican
Popular vote	321,661	172,314
Percentage	64.48%	34.54%
- County and independent city results Stephens: 40–50% 50–60% 60–70% 70–80% 80–90% >90% Henderson: 40–50% 50–60% 60–70% 70–80%
Lieutenant Governor before election
Allie Edward Stakes Stephens
Democratic
Elected Lieutenant Governor
Allie Edward Stakes Stephens
Democratic

The 1957 Virginia lieutenant gubernatorial election was held on November 5, 1957, in order to elect the lieutenant governor of Virginia. Democratic nominee and incumbent lieutenant governor Allie Edward Stakes Stephens defeated Republican nominee Horace E. Henderson and Independent candidate J. B. Brayman.

== General election ==
On election day, November 5, 1957, Democratic nominee Allie Edward Stakes Stephens won re-election by a margin of 149,347 votes against his foremost opponent Republican nominee Horace E. Henderson, thereby retaining Democratic control over the office of lieutenant governor. Stephens was sworn in for his second full term on January 20, 1958.

=== Results ===
Virginia lieutenant gubernatorial election, 1957
Party	Candidate	Votes	%
Democratic	Allie Edward Stakes Stephens (incumbent)	321,661	64.48
Republican	Horace E. Henderson	172,314	34.54
Independent	J. B. Brayman	4,857	0.98
Total votes		498,832	100.00
Democratic hold			
