= 1961 French cantonal elections =

Cantonale elections to renew canton general councillors were held in France on 4 and 11 June 1961.

== Electoral system ==
The cantonales elections use the same system as the regional or legislative elections. There is a 10% threshold (10% of registered voters) needed to proceed to the second round.

== National results ==
Runoff results missing

Party/Alliance	% (first round)	Seats
Miscellaneous Right	23.5%	436
PCF	18.6%	52
SFIO	16.8%	271
UNR	12.8%	166
MRP	9.8%	142
Radical Party	7.4%	211
Miscellaneous Left	8.4%	198
PSU-Far left	2.7%	28
