= 1957 United States House of Representatives elections =

There were four special elections to the United States House of Representatives in 1957 during the 85th United States Congress.

== List of elections ==
Elections are listed by date and district.

| District | Incumbent | | | This race | |
| District | Member | Party | First elected | Results | Candidates |
|---|---|---|---|---|---|
| New Mexico at-large | Antonio M. Fernández | Democratic | 1942 | Incumbent member-elect died November 7, 1956. New member elected April 9, 1957. Democratic hold. | ▌ ✓ Joseph Montoya (Democratic) 53.02%; ▌Tom Bolack (Republican) 46.98% |
| New Jersey 2 | T. Millet Hand | Republican | 1944 | Incumbent member-elect died during previous congress. New member elected November 5, 1957. Republican hold. | ▌ ✓ Milton W. Glenn (Republican) 54.81%; ▌Joseph G. Hancock (Democratic) 44.92% |
| Pennsylvania 13 | Samuel K. McConnell Jr. | Republican | 1944 (special) | Incumbent resigned September 1, 1957, after becoming executive director of the United Cerebral Palsy Associations. New member elected November 5, 1957. Republican hold. | ▌ ✓ John A. Lafore Jr. (Republican) 63.75%; ▌Glenn W. Preston (Democratic) 36.26% |
| Illinois 7 | James Bowler | Democratic | 1953 (special) | Incumbent died July 18, 1957. New member elected December 31, 1957. Democratic hold. | ▌ ✓ Roland V. Libonati (Democratic) 88.10%; ▌Anthony C. Catena (Republican) 11.90% |

== See also ==
- 1957 United States Senate elections
