= 1960 Louisiana gubernatorial election =

- April 19, 1960
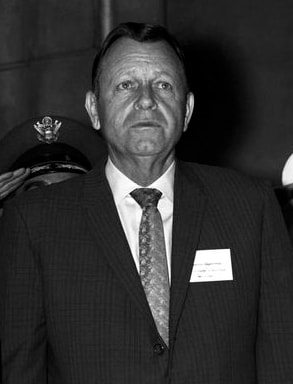

Candidate	Jimmie Davis	Francis Grevemberg
Party	Democratic	Republican
Popular vote	407,907	86,135
Percentage	81.52%	17.00%
- Parish results Davis: 50–60% 70–80% 80–90% >90%

The 1960 Louisiana gubernatorial election was held on April 19, 1960.

Primary elections were held in two rounds on December 5, 1959, and January 9, 1960. After defeating Chep Morrison, then the mayor of New Orleans, in a Democratic primary which featured some of the most racist campaign rhetoric in Louisiana political history, Jimmie Davis was elected to his second nonconsecutive term as governor after defeating the Republican candidate, Francis Grevemberg, in the general election.

== Background ==
Like most Southern states between the Reconstruction Era and the Civil Rights Movement, Louisiana's Republican Party was virtually nonexistent in terms of electoral support. This meant that the two Democratic Party primaries held on these dates were the real contest over who would be governor. In this election, however, a Republican ran, the first since Harrison Bagwell of Baton Rouge in 1952, who had polled 4 percent of the vote against the Democrat Robert F. Kennon.

== Democratic primary ==
=== Candidates ===
- Holt Allen, grocer from Jena
- Jimmie Davis, former governor of Louisiana from 1944 to 1948
- William J. "Bill" Dodd, State Comptroller
- John Krey Jr., New Orleans businessman
- Allen LaCombe, eccentric New Orleans gambler and perennial candidate
- Chep Morrison, Mayor of New Orleans
- James A. Noe, former governor in 1936 and unsuccessful candidate in 1940
- William Rainach, state senator from Claiborne Parish
- Mack Stewart Jr., Baptist minister from Baton Rouge
- Addison Roswell Thompson, a New Orleans taxicab company operator and Ku Klux Klan wizard

==== Withdrew ====
- J. Marshall Brown, a New Orleans insurance agent
- Earl Long, incumbent governor (running for lieutenant governor, barred from re-election by Supreme Court)

=== Campaign ===
At the beginning of the campaign, incumbent governor Earl Long announced his intention to run, despite being constitutionally barred from succeeding himself. After the Supreme Court insisted that he would have to resign several months before the election in order to legally run, Long withdrew and instead opted to run for Lieutenant-Governor on the Jimmy Noe ticket. The campaign got off to a slow start, with Davis running a bland campaign calling for "peace and harmony." Morrison campaigned on a platform of economic progress and development, while Noe and Dodd used promises of increased social programs to compete for traditional Long supporters.

Although easily winning the 1956 gubernatorial election, the ticket of Jimmy Noe and Earl Long finished a distant fourth. This is due, in part, because of the significant problems Earl Long experienced during the latter part of his last term in office such as his involuntary commitment to a state mental hospital, his affair with stripper Blaze Starr, and his ambivalence regarding civil rights issues.

Davis originally campaigned on a vague platform of peace and harmony in the first primary, before adopting a defense of segregation in the runoff. He was supported by the Regular Democratic Organization political machine in New Orleans and endorsed by The New Orleans Times-Picayune.

Morrison stressed his accomplishments as mayor for the previous fourteen years and called for industrialization of the state. He had the support of unions and favored large building programs and increased trade with Latin America.

Rainach campaigned as a staunch defender of segregation, using white supremacist rhetoric and attacking his opponents for their perceived softness on "the race question".

=== Results ===
1960 Democratic gubernatorial primary
Party	Candidate	Votes	%
Democratic	deLesseps Story Morrison	278,956	33.11%
Democratic	Jimmie Davis	213,551	25.34%
Democratic	William M. Rainach	143,095	16.98%
Democratic	James A. Noe	97,654	11.59%
Democratic	William J. "Bill" Dodd	85,436	10.14%
Democratic	Mack Stewart, Jr.	6,383	0.76%
Democratic	Allen LaCombe	4,917	0.58%
Democratic	Addison Roswell Thompson	4,200	0.50%
Democratic	Holt Allen	4,106	0.49%
Democratic	John Krey, Jr.	2,587	0.31%
Democratic	Gale Berry	1,724	0.20%
Total votes		842,609	100.00%

=== Run-off ===
==== Campaign ====
After seeing the explosive growth in support enjoyed by the little-known Rainach, who finished in third place after employing racist rhetoric in the primary, Davis adopted a similar tactic in the runoff. After receiving the endorsement of Rainach, Davis began to criticize Morrison for having received a large proportion of African-American votes in the primary. The Davis campaign claimed Morrison was supported by the NAACP – which Davis termed as "a communist Negro organization founded in New York" – and that he would integrate the state and use increased black voter registration to dominate Louisiana politics. The Times-Picayune aided the Davis campaign by emphasizing the high level of support Morrison had received from black voters. Earl Long also endorsed Davis.

Morrison responded in kind, extolling his record of support for segregation as mayor of New Orleans and questioning Davis's own segregationist credentials. He also boasted that he had been sued by the NAACP more times than any other Louisiana official. Though he was a supporter of segregation, Morrison depended on black votes and could not afford to alienate potential supporters by using the overtly racist rhetoric of his opponent. He remained on the defensive throughout the runoff campaign. The political liabilities of being an urbanite, a Catholic, and a perceived integrationist cost Morrison any support he might have expected in conservative, Protestant, segregationist northern Louisiana.

==== Results ====
1960 Democratic gubernatorial runoff
Party	Candidate	Votes	%	±%
Democratic	Jimmie Davis	487,681	54.08%	▲28.74
Democratic	deLesseps Story Morrison	414,110	45.92%	▲12.81
Total votes		901,791	100.00%	

== Republican primary ==
=== Candidates ===
- Francis Grevemberg, former State Superintendent of Police and Democratic candidate for governor in 1956

=== Results ===
Grevemberg was unopposed for the Republican nomination.

== General election ==
=== Campaign ===
In 1959–1960, former State Police Superintendent Francis Grevemberg rejected cries of "It can't be done" and switched parties to run for governor as a Republican. He faced Jimmie Davis in the general election. Grevemberg called for abolition of useless positions in state government and industrial recruitment efforts. His candidacy offered the state something that it had not seen before, a contested general election for governor. "Never before have the voters in this state been given such an opportunity for self-expression", opined Alexandria Daily Town Talk, "It is a rare opportunity for us to take part in an advanced course in government and politics."

Democrats were sufficiently confident of overwhelming victories to restrict their general election activities to a few party harmony speeches. Davis had stopped campaigning after he defeated Mayor Morrison and did not return to active campaign status until a few weeks prior to the general election.

Grevemberg was outraged at newspaper editorials against him. "My main purpose for entering this race was toward a two-party system ... I hope I have convinced a sizeable number of people we do need two parties." Grevemberg was particularly hostile toward the Times-Picayune (New Orleans), which called him a "turncoat" after he left the Democratic party, adding: "I risked my life and those of my family in attempts to rid this state of racketeers ... These newspapers have lived up to the reputation given them by Huey Long that they were yellow journals."

=== Results ===
1960 Louisiana gubernatorial election
Party	Candidate	Votes	%	±%
Democratic	Jimmie Davis	407,907	81.52%	▼18.48
Republican	Francis Grevemberg	86,135	17.00%	N/A
States' Rights Party of Louisiana	Kent Courtney	12,515	2.48%	N/A
Total votes				

Grevemberg scored his highest percent, 39.9 in Terrebonne Parish, and his second-best showing was the 27.2 percent in his native Lafayette Parish. In several parishes, Grevemberg polled less than 2 percent of the ballots.

== Analysis ==
In a time of growing support for the civil rights movement, the 1959–60 election was the first since the advent of Jim Crow in which race became the central issue of a Louisiana campaign. This election also marked the definitive end of the Long era in Louisiana politics. For the first time since 1928, no candidate backed by Huey or Earl Long made the runoff; Noe finished a distant fourth.

== Sources ==
- Jeansonne, Glen. "Racism and Longism in Louisiana: The 1959-60 Gubernatorial Election." Louisiana History 11, 1970.
- Liebling, A. J. The Earl of Louisiana. LSU Press, 1970.
- Louisiana Secretary of State. Primary Election Returns, 1960.
- Public Affairs Research Council of Louisiana. Voters' Guide to the Elections, '59-'60.
