= William A. Blakley =

American politician and businessman (1898–1976)

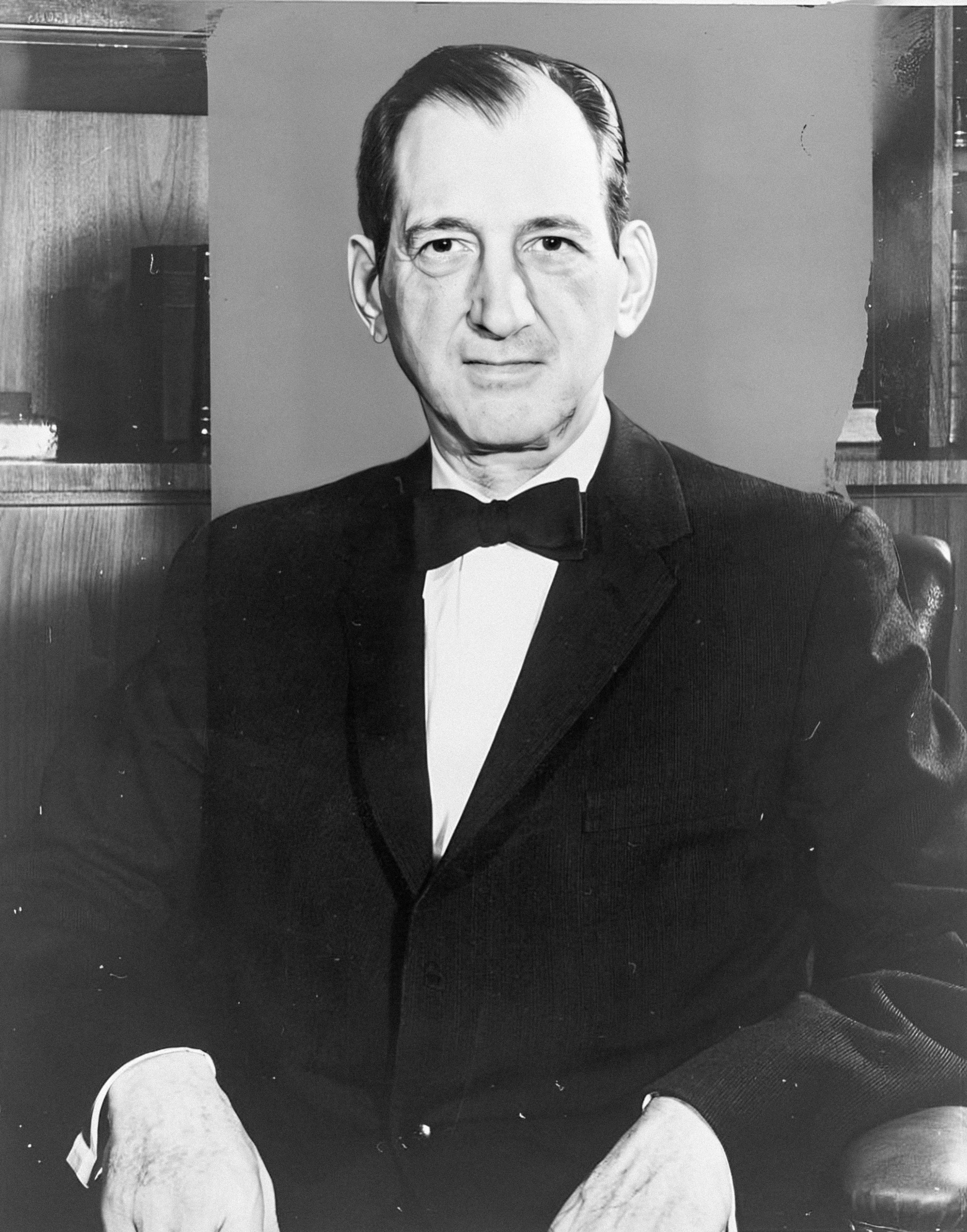
- Blakley in 1961

United States Senator from Texas
- In office January 3, 1961 – June 14, 1961
- Appointed by: Price Daniel
- Preceded by: Lyndon B. Johnson
- Succeeded by: John Tower
- In office January 15, 1957 – April 28, 1957
- Appointed by: Allan Shivers
- Preceded by: Price Daniel
- Succeeded by: Ralph Yarborough

Personal details
- Born: William Arvis Blakley; November 17, 1898 Miami Station, Missouri, U.S.
- Died: January 5, 1976 (aged 77) Dallas, Texas, U.S.
- Party: Democratic

Military service
- Allegiance: United States
- Branch/service: United States Army
- Battles/wars: World War I

William Arvis "Dollar Bill" Blakley (November 17, 1898 – January 5, 1976) was an American politician and businessman from the state of Texas. Blakley was part of the conservative wing of the Texas Democratic Party. He served twice as an interim United States Senator, appointed by the Governor to fill a vacancy until his successor could be duly elected. He served first in 1957 after the resignation of Price Daniel and again in 1961 after the resignation of Lyndon B. Johnson.

Blakley ran two unsuccessful campaigns for election to the Senate in his own right. He lost the regularly scheduled 1958 primary election to incumbent liberal Democrat Ralph Yarborough. He lost as the incumbent in the 1961 election to complete Johnson's term to John Tower, the first Republican elected by popular vote from Texas or any other former state of the Confederacy.

== Early years and career ==
Blakley was born in Miami Station, Missouri, but moved shortly after that with his parents to Arapaho, Oklahoma. He worked as a ranch hand as a young man, earning the nickname "Cowboy Bill." Blakley served with the United States Army in the First World War; he was admitted to the bar in 1933 and joined a law firm in Dallas, Texas. In following years, his interests expanded into real estate, ranch land, banking, and insurance; by 1957, he was estimated to be worth $300 million.

== Entry to politics ==
In 1956, Allan Shivers opted not to run for a fourth full term as Governor of Texas; U.S. Senator Price Daniel was elected governor. Like Shivers and Daniel, Blakley was an "Eisenhower Democrat" who had supported Dwight Eisenhower for president over the national Democratic Party nominee Adlai Stevenson in 1952 and 1956.

Blakley, who had gained prominence in Texas politics for his business successes, was building a $125 million shopping center and a 1,000-room hotel in Dallas. Just before he left office, Governor Shivers--who had been considering appointing a Republican candidate to the Senate seat--named Blakley to the Senate pending a special election.

Pressured by the Democratic Party to cool tensions from the gubernatorial election, Blakley did not seek the remaining term as senator and served for fewer than four months, from January 15 to April 28, 1957. Ralph Yarborough succeeded him in the special election, winning with a plurality of the vote when the conservatives divided three ways, with Republican Thad Hutcheson of Houston and Democratic U.S. Representative Martin Dies, Jr., collectively holding 53 percent of the vote.

After that, Texas law was changed to require a runoff between the two leading candidates in a special election if no one had a majority in the first round. Blakley left the Senate saying, "I shall go back to my boots and saddle and ride toward the Western sunset."

When the seat came up again in 1958 in the ordinary election cycle, Blakley ran in the primary against Yarborough as the conservative "Shivercrat" candidate. Blakley ran with the backing of Governor Daniel, Lyndon Johnson, Yarborough's colleague in the Senate, and the Southern bloc of senators who disagreed with Yarborough's progressive platform against segregation. The Speaker of the U.S. House of Representatives, fellow Texan Sam Rayburn, backed Yarborough in the primary though he had supported Blakley's Senate appointment in 1957. Rayburn's support proved critical. Blakley was defeated in the primary, and Yarborough kept his Senate seat by a margin of 680,000 to Blakley's 486,000.

== Senate appointment and subsequent loss ==
In 1961, upon Lyndon Johnson becoming Vice President of the United States, Blakley was appointed to fill Johnson's vacated Senate seat. Contention again appeared between the liberal and conservative wings of the Democratic Party for the nomination in the special election that would follow; Blakley maintained that he had vigorously resisted John F. Kennedy's "New Frontier" legislation, which was unpopular with Texas conservatives. Consequently, Ralph Yarborough did not endorse Blakley among the 71 candidates who ran without party designation.

Blakley ran a weak second with 191,818 (18.1 percent) votes to Republican John Tower's 327,308 (30.9 percent), with the remaining ballots divided among five other major Democratic candidates, including future U.S. House Speaker Jim Wright of Fort Worth, with 171,328 (16.2 percent). In the special election runoff, some Texas liberals refused to vote for a Democratic candidate who seemed as conservative as the Republican nominee, and some Texas conservatives viewed Blakley's conservatism as lukewarm. Blakley, at 62, was older than his Republican opponent--Tower was 35. Tower won the seat in the special election runoff with 448,217 votes (50.6 percent) to Blakley's 437,872 (49.4 percent), a margin of 10,343. Blakley was the first Democratic senator to lose to a Republican in Texas in over eighty years.

== Final years and death ==
After losing the Senate election, Blakley left politics and returned to his business interests. He died in Dallas and is buried there in Restland Memorial Park, alongside his wife, the former Villa W. Darnell, a native of Washita County, Oklahoma, who also died in Dallas. The couple had five children.

== Blakley Braniff Foundation ==
A library at the University of Dallas is named after him as a result of his and Braniff founder and President Thomas Elmer Braniff's support of the school through endowments from their Blakley Braniff Foundation. Blakley had contributed US$100 million to the foundation. Before 1961, Blakley was the largest single shareholder of Braniff International Airways.

Party political offices
Preceded by Lyndon B. Johnson	Democratic nominee for U.S. Senator from Texas (Class 2); 1961	Succeeded by Waggoner Carr
U.S. Senate
Preceded by Price Daniel	U.S. senator (Class 1) from Texas; January 15, 1957 – April 28, 1957; Served alongside: Lyndon B. Johnson	Succeeded by Ralph Yarborough
Preceded by Lyndon B. Johnson	U.S. senator (Class 2) from Texas; January 3, 1961 – June 14, 1961; Served alongside: Ralph Yarborough	Succeeded by John Tower
