= Ralph Yarborough =

American politician and lawyer (1903–1996)

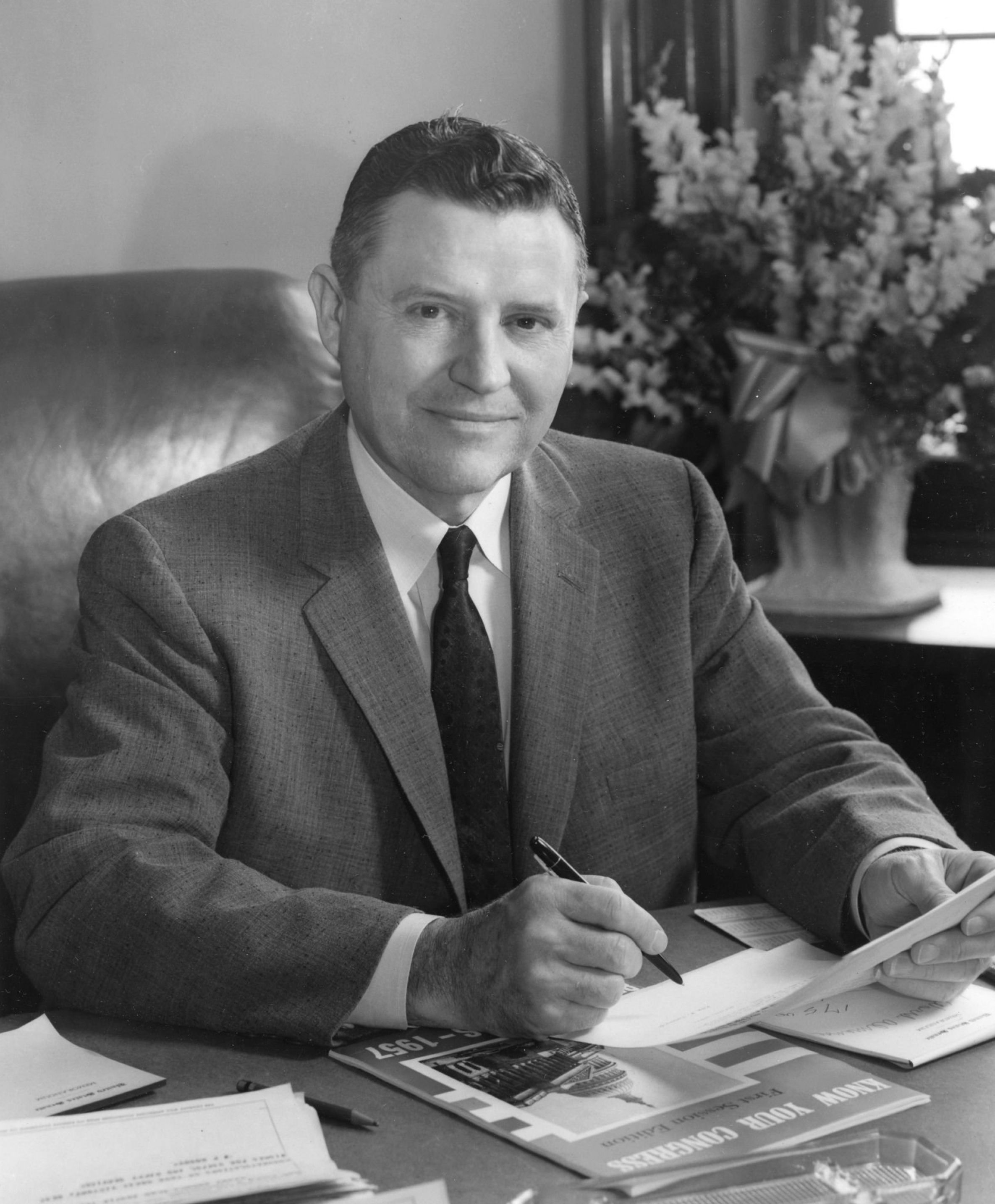
- Yarborough in 1957

United States Senator from Texas
- In office April 29, 1957 – January 3, 1971
- Preceded by: William A. Blakley
- Succeeded by: Lloyd Bentsen

Personal details
- Born: Ralph Webster Yarborough; June 8, 1903 Chandler, Texas, U.S.
- Died: January 27, 1996 (aged 92) Austin, Texas, U.S.
- Party: Democratic
- Spouse: Opal Warren (m. 1928)
- Children: 1
- Education: Sam Houston State Teachers College; University of Texas at Austin (LLB)

Military service
- Allegiance: United States
- Branch/service: United States Army
- Years of service: 1923–1926 (guard); 1943–1946 (army)
- Rank: Staff Sergeant (guard); Lieutenant Colonel (army)
- Unit: Texas Army National Guard; 36th Infantry Division
- Battles/wars: World War II

Ralph Webster Yarborough (June 8, 1903 – January 27, 1996) was an American politician and lawyer who represented Texas in the United States Senate from 1957 to 1971. A member of the Democratic Party, he was a leader of the progressive wing of the party. Along with Senate Majority Leader Lyndon B. Johnson and Speaker of the House Sam Rayburn, but unlike most Southern congressmen, Yarborough refused to support the 1956 Southern Manifesto, which called for resistance to the racial integration of schools and other public places. Yarborough voted in favor of the Civil Rights Acts of 1957, 1960, 1964, and 1968, as well as the 24th Amendment to the U.S. Constitution, the Voting Rights Act of 1965, and the confirmation of Thurgood Marshall to the U.S. Supreme Court. Yarborough was the only senator from a state that was part of the Confederacy to vote for all five bills.

Born in Chandler, Texas, Yarborough practiced law in El Paso after graduating from the University of Texas School of Law. He became an assistant to Texas Attorney General James Burr V Allred in 1931 and specialized in prosecuting major oil companies. Allred was later elected governor of Texas and appointed Yarborough to a judgeship in Travis County. After serving in the United States Army during World War II, Yarborough repeatedly ran for governor, opposing the conservative faction of Democrats led by Allan Shivers. Price Daniel resigned from the Senate after winning the 1956 gubernatorial election, and Yarborough won the special election to serve the remainder of Daniel's term. He won election to a full term in 1958 and was reelected again in 1964, defeating Harris County Republican Party Chairman George H. W. Bush in the latter race.

Yarborough was known as "Smilin' Ralph" and used the slogan "Let's put the jam on the lower shelf so the little people can reach it" in his campaigns. He staunchly supported the "Great Society" legislation that encompassed Medicare and Medicaid, the War on Poverty, federal support for higher education and veterans, and other programs. He also co-wrote the Endangered Species Act and was the most powerful proponent of the Big Thicket National Preserve. Yarborough criticized the Vietnam War and supported Robert F. Kennedy in the 1968 presidential election until the latter's assassination.

In 1970, Yarborough lost re-nomination to fellow Democrat Lloyd Bentsen, who campaigned as relatively more conservative. Yarborough attempted to win the 1972 Democratic primary for Texas's other Senate seat, but lost the primary to Barefoot Sanders. He did not seek public office after that year and died at the age of 92 in January 1996.

== Early life ==
Yarborough was born in Chandler in Henderson County west of Tyler, the seventh of nine children of Charles Richard Yarborough and the former Nannie Jane Spear. He was appointed to the United States Military Academy at West Point in 1919 but dropped out to become a teacher. Yarborough instead attended Sam Houston State Teachers College and transferred to the University of Texas at Austin. Yarborough graduated from the University of Texas Law School in 1927 and practiced law in El Paso until he was hired as an assistant attorney general in 1931 by the state Attorney General and later Governor James V. Allred. From 1923 to 1926 he served with the 36th Infantry Division of the Texas Army National Guard, reaching the rank of Staff Sergeant. After attending teaching school he taught for three years in Delta County and Martin Springs. He spent one year working and studying foreign trade and international relations in Europe, mostly as assistant secretary for the American Chamber of Commerce in Berlin, Germany.

Yarborough was an expert in Texas land law and specialized in prosecuting major oil companies that violated production limits or failed to pay oil royalties to the Permanent School Fund for drilling on public lands. He earned renown for winning a million dollar judgment against the Mid-Kansas Oil and Gas Company for oil royalties, the second largest judgment ever in Texas at the time. After Allred was elected governor, he appointed Yarborough judge of the 53rd Judicial District serving Travis County, the county seat of which is Austin. Yarborough was elected to a four-year term later the same year. Yarborough's first run for state office resulted in a third-place finish in the Democratic primary for state attorney general in 1938 against the sitting lieutenant governor. Yarborough served in the U.S. Army during World War II after 1943 and achieved the rank of lieutenant colonel.

Before being elected a senator, Yarborough served on the Lower Colorado River Authority's board of directors and lectured on land law at University of Texas School of Law in 1935. He also served as a presiding judge for the Third Administrative Judicial District of Texas. From 1947 to 1951 he was a member of the Texas Board of Law Examiners.

== Political career ==
=== Gubernatorial bids ===
Yarborough was urged to run again for state attorney general in 1952, and he planned to do so until he received a personal affront from Governor Allan Shivers who told him not to run. Texas Secretary of State John Ben Shepperd resigned in the spring of 1952 and was elected attorney general that year. He served two two-year terms. Angered at Shivers, Yarborough ran in the gubernatorial primaries in 1952 and 1954 against the conservative Shivers, drawing support from labor unions and liberals. Yarborough denounced the "Shivercrats" for veterans' fraud in the Texas Veterans Land Board of the Texas General Land Office and for endorsing in 1952 and 1956 the Republican Eisenhower/Nixon ticket, instead of the Democrat Adlai Stevenson of Illinois. Shivers portrayed Yarborough as an integrationist supported by communists and unions. The 1954 election was particularly nasty in its race-baiting by Shivers as it was the year that Brown v. Board of Education was decided, and Shivers made the most of the court decision in order to play on voters' fears. Yarborough, however, nearly upset Shivers.

In 1956, Yarborough made it to the primary runoff for governor against U.S. Senator Price Daniel. Texas historian J. Evetts Haley ran in the primary to the political right of both Daniel and Yarborough but lost. After being endorsed by former opponent and former Governor W. Lee O'Daniel, and making aggressive attacks on the Shivers-backed candidate, Yarborough looked to win the runoff, but instead he trailed Daniel by about nine thousand votes. It is believed (by Yarborough, his supporters, and biographer) that the election was stolen because of irregular voting in East Texas and that Yarborough really won the runoff by 30,000 votes. Nevertheless, Yarborough's runs for governor had raised his stature and popularity in the state as he had been campaigning for six straight years for office.

=== U. S. senator ===
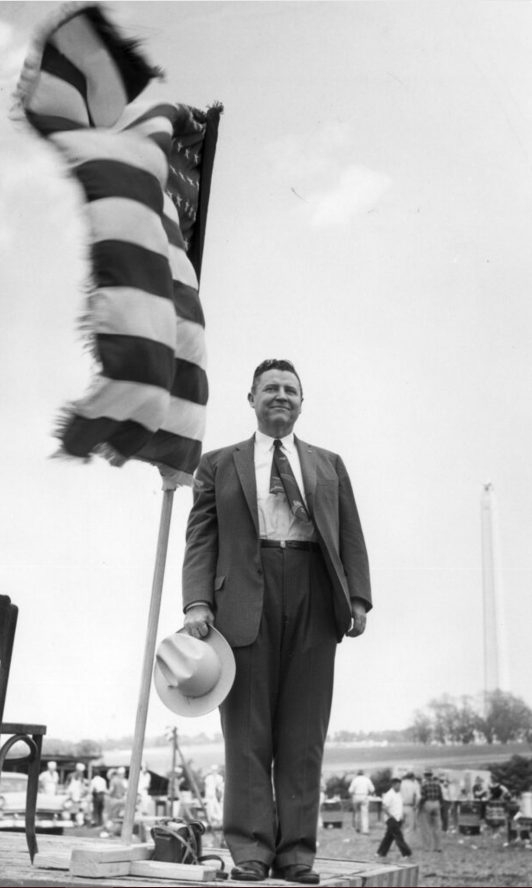
Yarborough in a 1958 rally.

When Daniel resigned from the Senate in 1957 to become governor, Yarborough ran in the special election to fill the empty seat. With no runoff then required, he needed only a plurality of votes to win. Ironically, his many runs for governor made him the best positioned candidate. Yarborough won the special election with 38 percent of the vote to join fellow Texan Lyndon B. Johnson in the Senate. The runner-up in the race with 30 percent of the vote was U.S. Representative Martin Dies, Jr., known for his investigations into communist infiltration. A Republican lawyer from Houston, Thad Hutcheson, ran third with 23 percent of the ballots cast.

James Boren served as Yarborough's campaign manager and chief of staff. In office, Ralph Yarborough was a very different kind of Southern senator. He did not support the Southern Manifesto opposing integration and supported national Democratic goals of more funding for health care, education, and the environment. Himself a veteran, he worked to expand the G.I. Bill to Cold War veterans. Yarborough's first major legislative victory was the successful passage of the National Defense Education Act of 1958, which began federal funding of loans and grants to universities and their students.

In the 1958 Democratic primary, Yarborough easily defeated the conservative William A. Blakley, a millionaire businessman from Dallas who was backed by Daniel. Blakley had been the interim senator from January to April 1957 but did not run in the special election in which Yarborough defeated Dies and Hutcheson. Instead Blakley was appointed senator again in 1961 and ran in another special election, only to be defeated by the Republican John Tower.

In the nationally Democratic year of 1958, Yarborough cruised to victory in the general election over the Republican nominee, publisher Roy Whittenburg of Amarillo. During his first full term, Yarborough worked for a bill signed by President John F. Kennedy to designate Padre Island as a national seashore. While serving in the Senate he was a member of the Interparliamentary Union Group from 1961 to 1970 and a member of the board of directors of Gallaudet College from 1969 to 1971.

=== Assassination of John F. Kennedy ===
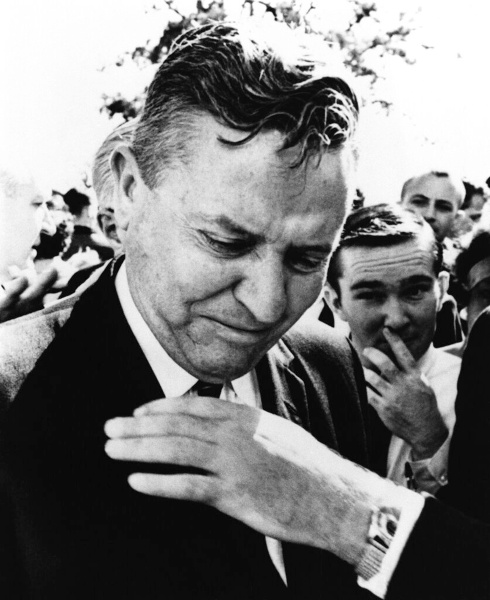
Ralph Yarborough on the day of John F. Kennedy's assassination.

Yarborough rode in the Dallas motorcade in which John F. Kennedy was assassinated on November 22, 1963. He was in a convertible with Vice President Lyndon B. Johnson, Lady Bird Johnson (who sat between Yarborough and Johnson), United States Secret Service agent Rufus Youngblood, and Hurchel Jacks of the Texas State Highway Patrol. From the start of the President's tour of Texas, Yarborough considered that he had been slighted by some of the arrangements and so, in the early stages, refused to ride with Johnson, despite repeated pleas by Youngblood. His decision, underpinned by a long-standing feud with Governor Connally, an old friend and erstwhile ally of Johnson, caused embarrassment to both the President and Vice President and drew considerable diversionary attention in the press. According to Johnson, Kennedy considered Yarborough's behavior "an outrage" and there is some evidence of a heated exchange between Kennedy and Johnson the night before Kennedy's death. According to Johnson's biographer Robert Caro, the next morning in Fort Worth, Kennedy intervened directly with Yarborough, making clear that, if he valued his friendship, he would ride with Johnson when the party reached Dallas. Then, during the short flight from Fort Worth, Kennedy persuaded Connally to give Yarborough a more prominent role in some of the later functions planned in Austin. In the ensuing motorcade, the car carrying Yarborough and Johnson was two cars behind the presidential limousine carrying Kennedy and Connally (who was seriously wounded during the attack). In a later interview, Yarborough called the event "the most tragic event of my life." Shortly after Johnson became president, Yarborough telephoned him in conciliatory and supportive terms.

==== Wrestling with Thurmond ====
Shortly after the passing of the Civil Rights Act of 1964, on July 9, Johnson nominated former Florida governor LeRoy Collins to a position in the Community Relations Service, which was designed to mediate racial disputes. Strom Thurmond, the most senior southern member of the Commerce Committee, bitterly opposed Collins's nomination, based on a speech that Collins made in Thurmond's home state in which he said that southern leaders’ “harsh and intemperate” language unnecessarily stoked racial unrest. Commerce Chairman Warren Magnuson was aware that he had the votes in favor of the nomination, but had failed to get the required quorum. Thurmond, aware of Magnuson's struggles, stationed himself outside of the committee door, physically blocking any entry by later-arriving senators.

Later, Yarborough arrived, and was blocked from entering. The only southern senator to have voted for the Civil Rights Act, Yarborough joked to Thurmond, "Come on in, Strom, and help us get a quorum." Thurmond responded, "If I can keep you out, you won’t go in, and if you can drag me in, I’ll stay there." Thurmond and Yarborough were both 61 years old, but Thurmond was 30 pounds (14 kg) lighter and much fitter. After some light scuffling, both senators removed their suit jackets. Thurmond overpowered Yarborough, whom he managed to force down to the ground. "Tell me to release you, Ralph, and I will," said Thurmond. Yarborough refused. Another senator approached, suggesting that they stop before one of them had a heart attack. Eventually, the fight was broken up by Magnuson, who growled, "Come on, you fellows, let’s break this up." Yarborough said, "I have to yield to the order of my chairman." Thurmond and Yarborough composed themselves and entered the committee chamber.

Collins was nominated by a vote of 16 to 1.

=== 1964 re-election bid ===
In 1964, Yarborough again won the primary without a runoff, and won the general election with 56.2% of the vote. His Republican opponent was George H. W. Bush, who attacked Yarborough as a left-wing demagogue and for his vote in favor of the Civil Rights Act of 1964. Yarborough denounced Bush as an extremist to the right of that year's GOP presidential nominee, Barry Goldwater, and as a rich easterner and carpetbagger trying to buy a Senate seat. It has since been learned that then-Governor Connally was covertly aiding Bush, against President Johnson's wishes, by teaching Democrats the techniques of split ticket voting. In the same election, Connally defeated Bush's ticket-mate, Jack Crichton. In 1967, Yarborough was the first U.S. senator to introduce the first bilingual education act.

Although Yarborough supported Johnson's domestic agenda, he went public with his criticism of Johnson's foreign policy and the Vietnam War after Johnson announced his retirement. Yarborough supported Robert F. Kennedy for president until his assassination, then Eugene McCarthy until his loss in Chicago, finally backing Hubert Humphrey in his 1968 campaign against Nixon. In 1969, Yarborough became chairman of the Senate Committee on Labor and Public Welfare.

=== 1970 re-election bid ===
In 1970, South Texan businessman and former Congressman Lloyd Bentsen defeated Yarborough in the Democratic primary, when Yarborough was focusing on an expected second general election campaign against Bush. Bentsen played on voters' fears of societal breakdown and urban riots, made an issue of Yarborough's opposition to the Vietnam War, and called him a political antique. Bentsen said, "It would be nice if Ralph Yarborough would vote for his state every once in a while." He defeated Bush in the general election.

=== 1972 attempt at a comeback ===
In 1972, Yarborough made a comeback effort to win the Democratic nomination to challenge Senator John Tower, who as a young man had once circulated Yarborough stickers. Yarborough won the first round of the primary and came within 526 votes of winning the primary without the need for a runoff. He again made accusations of vote fraud from the conservative wing. He lost in the primary runoff to a former U.S. Attorney, Barefoot Sanders, in an anti-incumbent sweep after the Sharpstown Bank-stock Scandal despite neither being an incumbent nor involved at all with the scandal.

From 1973 to 1974, Yarborough served as a member of the Constitutional Revision Commission of Texas. From 1983 to 1987, he served as a member of the State Library and Archives Commission of Texas. He practiced law in Austin from 1971 until his death in 1996.

== Death ==
Yarborough died in 1996 at his home in Austin. He is interred at the Texas State Cemetery there beside his wife, the former Opal Warren, a native of Murchison in Henderson County, Texas. The Texas State Cemetery is sometimes called "the Arlington of Texas". Yarborough left a legacy in the modernization of the state of Texas and achieved political power when Texas had a native son, Lyndon Johnson, in the White House. He was combative with the dominant industries of oil and natural gas and pushed for the petroleum industry to pay a greater share of taxes. Their son, Richard Warren Yarborough, a lawyer since 1955, died on March 5, 1986, at age 54. Ralph and his wife Opal were survived by three grandchildren and six great-grandchildren.

== Legacy ==
Yarborough was one of the last of the New Deal Democrats and powerful liberals in Texas state politics. (He was followed by more conservative senators such as Bentsen and Phil Gramm). Yarborough is remembered as the acknowledged "patron saint of Texas liberals". Supporters and former aides who have since risen to prominence include Jim Hightower, Ann Richards, and Garry Mauro.

The University of Texas at Austin Press published a biography, Ralph W. Yarborough: The People's Senator, by Patrick L. Cox. It features a foreword by Senator Edward Kennedy.

The Yarborough Branch of the Austin Public Library was named in Yarborough's honor.

In October 1966, Yarborough introduced Senate Bill 5–3929 to establish a 75,000-acre national park to preserve the remaining natural and undisturbed areas of the Big Thicket in southeast Texas. Due in part to opposition from the lumber industry in the region, as well as vague and disputed definitions of what and where the Big Thicket actually was, it took seven years and another 27 Big Thicket bills until Congress established the Big Thicket National Preserve in 1974.

Yarborough was well known for his commitment to science. He favored the creation of the National Aeronautics and Space Administration (NASA) and in 1957 was on a subcommittee that began the investigation that resulted in NASA's creation. The next year, he voted for the National Aeronautics and Space Act, citing the impact he believed the agency could have on his hometown of Houston.

Yarborough advocated more education in science and technology in schools throughout the country. In his biography, he wrote, "NASA helped push ahead progress in technology. The country's schools should be oriented towards developing technology and teaching science."

Party political offices
Preceded by Price Daniel	Democratic nominee for U.S. Senator from Texas (Class 1); 1957, 1958, 1964	Succeeded by Lloyd Bentsen
U.S. Senate
Preceded by William A. Blakley	U.S. senator (Class 1) from Texas; 1957–1971; Served alongside: Lyndon B. Johnson, William Blakley, John G. Tower	Succeeded by Lloyd Bentsen
