= Yarborough =

Yarborough or Yarbrough are related English toponymic surnames. They originated from Yarburgh (Yarborough) in Lincolnshire, named from the Old English habitational or topographic name eorðburg ‘earthworks’, ‘fortifications’, (a compound of eorðe or eorethe ‘earth’, ‘soil’ + burg ‘fortress’, ‘burrow’). Variants include Yerberg, Yarburgh, Yarboro, Yarbro and other forms.

Notable people with the surname include:

- Alex Yarbrough (born 1991), American baseball player
- Barton Yarborough (1900–1951), American radio actor
- Cale Yarborough (1939–2023), American race car driver
- Camille Yarbrough (born 1934), American musician
- Cavin Yarbrough (1954–2025), American musician, member of the musical group Yarbrough and Peoples
- Cecil S. Yarbrough (1878–1946), American politician and physician
- Cedric Yarbrough (born 1973), American comedic actor, best known for his role on Reno 911!
- Chelsea Quinn Yarbro (1942–2025), American horror and fantasy writer
- Clay Yarborough (born 1981), American politician
- Destanie Yarbrough (born 1990), American martial artist
- Don Yarborough (1925–2009), American politician
- Don Yarbrough (born 1941), American judge
- Earl G. Yarbrough (born 1946), American university administrator
- Ed Yarbrough (born 1943), American lawyer
- Eddie Yarbrough (born 1993), American football player
- Emmanuel Yarborough (1960–2015), American sumo wrestler, world's heaviest athlete
- Ernie Yarborough, American race car driver
- Ernie Yarbrough (born 1981), American politician
- Fanny Neal Yarborough (1870–1941), American political hostess and social worker
- Frances Yarborough, American actress and former wife of Don Knotts
- Francis Yarborough (died 1770), Oxford college head
- Geech Yarborough, American baseball player
- George Yarbrough (1916–1988), American newspaper owner and politician
- George Malone Yarbrough (1916–?), American politician
- Glenn Yarbrough (1930–2016), American singer, lead of The Limeliters
- Hyram Yarbro (born 1996), American social media influencer
- James C. Yarbrough (born 1957), American army general
- Jean Yarbrough (1900–1975), American film director
- Jeff Yarbro (born 1977), American politician
- Jim Yarbrough (offensive lineman) (born 1946), American football player
- Jim Yarbrough (defensive back) (born 1963), American football player
- Jim Yarbrough (basketball) (born 1964), American college basketball coach
- Jon Yarbrough, American billionaire, founder of Video Gaming Technologies
- Josephine McDonald Yarbrough (1879–1961), American writer and clubwoman
- Karen Yarbrough (1950–2024), American politician
- Katie Yarborough, birth name of Caterina Jarboro (1898–1986), American opera singer
- Kim Yarbrough (born 1961), American singer and actress
- Larry Yarborough (born 1962), American politician
- LeeRoy Yarbrough (1938–1984), American race car driver
- Matthew E. Yarbrough (born 1966), American lawyer
- Nellie Yarborough (1925–2012), American Pentecostal bishop, pastor, and community activist
- Philip Yarbrough (1937–2008; Bill Drake), American radio personality
- Richard Yarborough (born 1951), American academic
- Steve Yarbrough (politician) (born 1947), American politician
- Steve Yarbrough (writer) (born 1956), American novelist
- Ralph Yarborough (1903–1996), American politician
- Rual Yarbrough (1930–2010), American banjo player
- Ryan Yarborough (born 1971), American football player
- Ryan Yarbrough (born 1991), American baseball player
- Thomas R. Yarborough (1895–1969), American politician from California
- Vincent Yarbrough (born 1981), American basketball player
- William Yarbrough (born 1989), American soccer player
- William P. Yarborough (1912–2005), American general
