= Sieker =

Sieker is a surname. Notable people with the surname include:

- Lamartine Pemberton Sieker Jr. (1848–1914), American lawman
- Edward Armon Sieker (1853–1901), American lawman
- William F. Sieker (1849–1930), American farmer and politician
