= 1978 Texas State Treasurer election =

1978 Texas State Treasurer Democratic primary election
- May 6, 1978

Nominee	Warren Harding	Harry Ledbetter	C. R. Sanderson
Party	Democratic	Democratic	Democratic
Popular vote	810,320	491,592	208,012
Percentage	53.7%	32.6%	13.8%

The 1978 Texas State Treasurer election was held on November 7, 1978, to elect the Texas State Treasurer. The primary election was held on May 6, 1978. Democratic incumbent Warren Harding won a contested primary narrowly avoiding a runoff election against former Texas A&M quarterback Harry Ledbetter. At the time Texas, like other Southern States, was dominated by the Democratic party and winning the primary was tantamount to winning the general election. Following this pattern, Harding went on to win the general election facing only minor opposition.

== Democratic primary ==
=== Background ===
The long-time incumbent of the office, Jesse James, passed away in 1977, after having served as State Treasurer for almost 36 years. Governor Dolph Briscoe appointed the Treasurer of Dallas County Warren G. Harding, no relation to the President of the same name, to fill the vacancy. Harding had previously run for the seat before in 1956, but had lost the primary to James.

=== Candidates ===
- Warren Glenn Harding, incumbent Treasurer
- Harry Ledbetter, former Texas A&M quarterback
- C. R. "Charlie" Sanderson

=== Results ===
Democratic primary
Party	Candidate	Votes	%
Democratic	Warren Harding (incumbent)	810,320	53.7
Democratic	Harry Ledbetter	491,592	32.6
Democratic	C. R. Sanderson	208,012	13.8
Total votes		1,509,924	100.0

== General election ==
=== Results ===
1978 Texas State Treasurer election
Party	Candidate	Votes	%	±%
Democratic	Warren G. Harding (incumbent)	1,565,076	97.03	▲32.45
Socialist Workers	Derrick Adams	47,716	2.96	N/A
Write-in	Bob Garrett Kunta Kinte	132	0.01	N/A
Total votes		1,612,924	100.00	
Democratic hold				
