= W. Gregory Hatcher =

American lawyer

Werter Gregory Hatcher

Texas State Treasurer
- In office 1925–1931
- Governor: Miriam A. Ferguson; Dan Moody
- Preceded by: Sidney Lee Staples
- Succeeded by: Charley Lockhart

Personal details
- Born: Werter Gregory Hatcher; September 7, 1876; Cumberland, Virginia, US
- Died: November 26, 1960 (aged 84); Dallas, Texas, US
- Resting place: Texas State Cemetery; Austin, Texas
- Political party: Democratic
- Spouse: Mary Ellen Coleman
- Parent(s): John H. Hatcher; Lucy Gregory

Werter Gregory Hatcher (September 7, 1876 – November 26, 1960) was an attorney and Texas State Treasurer from 1925 to 1931.

== Early life ==
Hatcher was born on September 7, 1876, in Cumberland County, Virginia, to John H. Hatcher and Lucy Gregory, the youngest of seven children. Hatcher moved to Philadelphia, Pennsylvania, and on November 29, 1900, he returned to his native Cumberland County to marry Mary Ellen Coleman.

By 1910, the Hatchers had moved to Dallas, Texas, where the 1910 Census records that Hatcher was an attorney. The Hatchers had one daughter, Ellen Frances.

== Political career ==
In the 1924 Texas Democratic Primary, Charles V. Terrell was nominated for a non-consecutive term as Texas State Treasurer. After the primary, Walter Marshall William Splawn, the nominee for the Texas Railroad Commission was appointed President of the University of Texas and the Texas Democratic Central Committee appointed Terrell as the nominee for the Railroad Commission and turned to Hatcher to be the nominee for State Treasurer. In November, Hatcher was elected over Republican candidate Mrs. J. H. Peters by an overwhelming margin.

Hatcher was reelected in 1926, having a spirited primary and runoff, defeating J.R. Ball by a margin of 60%-40%. He is reported during the campaign to have said, "Public office is a public trust and must not be used for private gain."

In the 1928 Democratic Primary, Hatcher defeated Grover Cleveland Harris and went on to beat Republican C.P. Scales by a margin of nearly 2 to 1. In 1930, Hatcher did not seek reelection and he was succeeded by Charley Lockhart.

Hatcher made one more run at political office when he challenged incumbent State Treasurer Jesse James in the 1942 Democratic Primary. James was renominated and easily reelected that year.

== Death and burial ==
Hatcher died in Dallas on November 26, 1960, and was interred in Oakwood Cemetery in Austin, Texas.

Party political offices
Preceded by Charles Vernon Terrell	Democratic nominee for Texas State Treasurer; 1924, 1926, 1928	Succeeded by Charley Lockhart
Political offices
Preceded by Sidney Lee Staples	Texas State Treasurer; 1925–1931	Succeeded by Charley Lockhart
