= A. J. Irwin =

- Born: August 22, 1957 (age 68); Chula Vista, California; United States
- Occupations: Director of Investigations; Former Federal Agent
- Employer: Yarbrough Strategic Advisors
- Website: Yarbrough Strategic Advisors

A. J. Irwin (born August 22, 1957) is a former federal agent who performed covert operations domestically and throughout Latin America and the Caribbean, resulting in the prosecution and dismantling of criminal organizations involving alien smuggling, narcotics trafficking, weapons trafficking and other illicit activities. Additionally, he managed anti-terrorism and anti-smuggling enforcement operations for the Department of Homeland Security for the central corridor of the U.S. He is currently the managing director of Investigations for Yarbrough Strategic Advisors (YSA) in Dallas, Texas.

== Operation Seek and Keep, Immigration Cases, Anti-Terrorism Operations ==
As an agent for the United States Immigration and Naturalization Service (now the Department of Homeland Security) Irwin co-organized and led the successful multinational taskforce Operation Seek and Keep, the first INS-led wire tap case in U.S. history that resulted in a successful criminal prosecution. Regarding the operation, then U.S. Attorney General Janet Reno called it, "the largest alien smuggling organization ever dismantled in United States history."

In 1998, the investigation broke an international alien smuggling and money-laundering ring that brought in an estimated 12,000 illegal aliens to the United States at a cost of $20,000 per alien, generating more than $200 million in proceeds over a 3-year period. The organization smuggled aliens who were nationals of India, Afghanistan, Pakistan, and Syria. The operation identified smuggling routes that started in India and went to Moscow, where connecting flights allowed aliens to travel to Latin American or the Caribbean. Aliens would then either fly or travel by boat to the Miami area or walk across the Mexican border.

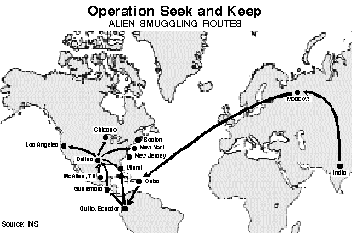
U.S. Immigration and Naturalization Service map of alien smuggling routes broken by Operation "Seek and Keep" in 1998. The cartel moved aliens from India through Moscow and on to Cuba, from where the aliens were transported by land or traveled by land into the U.S.

Operation Seek and Keep was the first investigation authorized to use wiretapping technology in an illegal immigrant smuggling case, as approved by the Illegal Immigration Reform and Immigrant Responsibility Act of 1996, and was the first to use money-laundering] statutes to dismantle an alien smuggling operation and seize its assets.

Domestically, Irwin served as lead case agent in United States v Pappas, Inc., a three-year federal investigation of Houston-based Pappas Partners restaurants, resulting in the largest corporate criminal fine for immigration violations for a corporate employer in U.S. history. The investigation raided six Pappas-owned restaurants in the Dallas area and found more than 100 undocumented workers. The company ultimately agreed to pay a $1.7 million fine and in a plea bargain it admitted that it had hidden illegal aliens during raids and altered personnel records.

Irwin also served as Deputy Assistant Director for the Investigations Division of the Central Region of the United States, Department of Homeland Security, managing anti-smuggling enforcement operations for 18 states in the central corridor of the U.S. His service commendations include the INS Commissioner's Award in 1997 and 1999, and a Sustained Superior Accomplishment recognition in 2002 for his contributions to the World Trade Center/Pentagon Investigation.

== Yarbrough Strategic Advisors ==
In 2007, Irwin joined Yarbrough Strategic Advisors, a Dallas-based company founded by former Assistant United States Attorney Matthew E. Yarbrough, with whom he worked closely in Operation Seek and Keep. As the managing director of investigations, he advises client companies on immigration laws and supervises intellectual property, financial fraud and corporate compliance investigations.

== Personal ==
Irwin was born in Mount Pleasant, Michigan and grew up in Chula Vista, California. He began his career in 1979 as an undercover police officer with the Brunswick Police Department in Brunswick, Georgia. He was later promoted to undercover officer, deputy, and criminal investigator for the Monroe County Sheriff's Office in Forsyth, Georgia, before becoming a border patrol agent in the El Paso sector. In 1987 he joined the U.S. Department of Immigration and Naturalization, which later became the Department of Homeland Security, Immigration and Customs Enforcement. He lives in Dallas, Texas.
