= David Rivera (disambiguation) =

David Rivera (born 1965) is an American politician.

David Rivera may also refer to:

- David Rivera (attorney), American lawyer
- David A. Rivera, American politician
