= Jerry Martin =

Jerry Martin may refer to:

- Jerry Martin (baseball) (born 1949), American former Major League Baseball outfielder
- Jerry Martin (ski jumper) (born 1950), American former ski jumper
- Jerry Martin (composer), American composer
- Jerry Martin (producer) (born 1960), known for producing The Great Adventures of Slick Rick
- Jerry A. Martin, American tenor vocalist, formerly of the Kingdom Heirs
- Jerry L. Martin, chairman emeritus of the American Council of Trustees and Alumni
- Jerry E. Martin, United States Attorney in Tennessee
- Jerry Martin, pseudonym used by Jerry Buckner of Buckner & Garcia
