= Nine Men (disambiguation) =

Nine Men may refer to:

- Nine Men, a citizens advisory board in New Netherland
- Nine Men (film), a 1943 British patriotic movie

== See also ==
- Nine Men of Praha Monument, a monument in Austen, Texas, United States
- Nine men's morris, a board game
- Nine Men's Misery, a veterans memorial
