= James Sylvester =

James Sylvester may refer to:

- James Austin Sylvester (1807–1882), Texas soldier who captured Antonio Lopez de Santa Anna
- James Joseph Sylvester (1814–1897), English mathematician

== See also ==
- A. J. Sylvester (Albert James Sylvester, 1889–1989), private secretary to British heads of state
