= Warren Harding (disambiguation) =

Warren G. Harding (1865–1923) was the 29th president of the United States from 1921 to 1923.

Warren Harding may also refer to:

- Warren G. Harding (Texas politician) (1921–2005)
- Warren G. Harding High School
- Warren Harding High School
- Warren Harding (climber) (1924–2002)
