= John Yarbrough =

John Yarbrough may refer to:

- John Yarbrough (retired 2008), former parks director, after whom the John Yarbrough Linear Park, Fort Myers, Florida, USA is named
- John Yarbrough, author of 2014 play Petra
- Jon Yarbrough, American billionaire, the founder of Video Gaming Technologies
