= Medal of Honor Monument (Austin, Texas) =

Memorial in Austin, Texas, U.S.

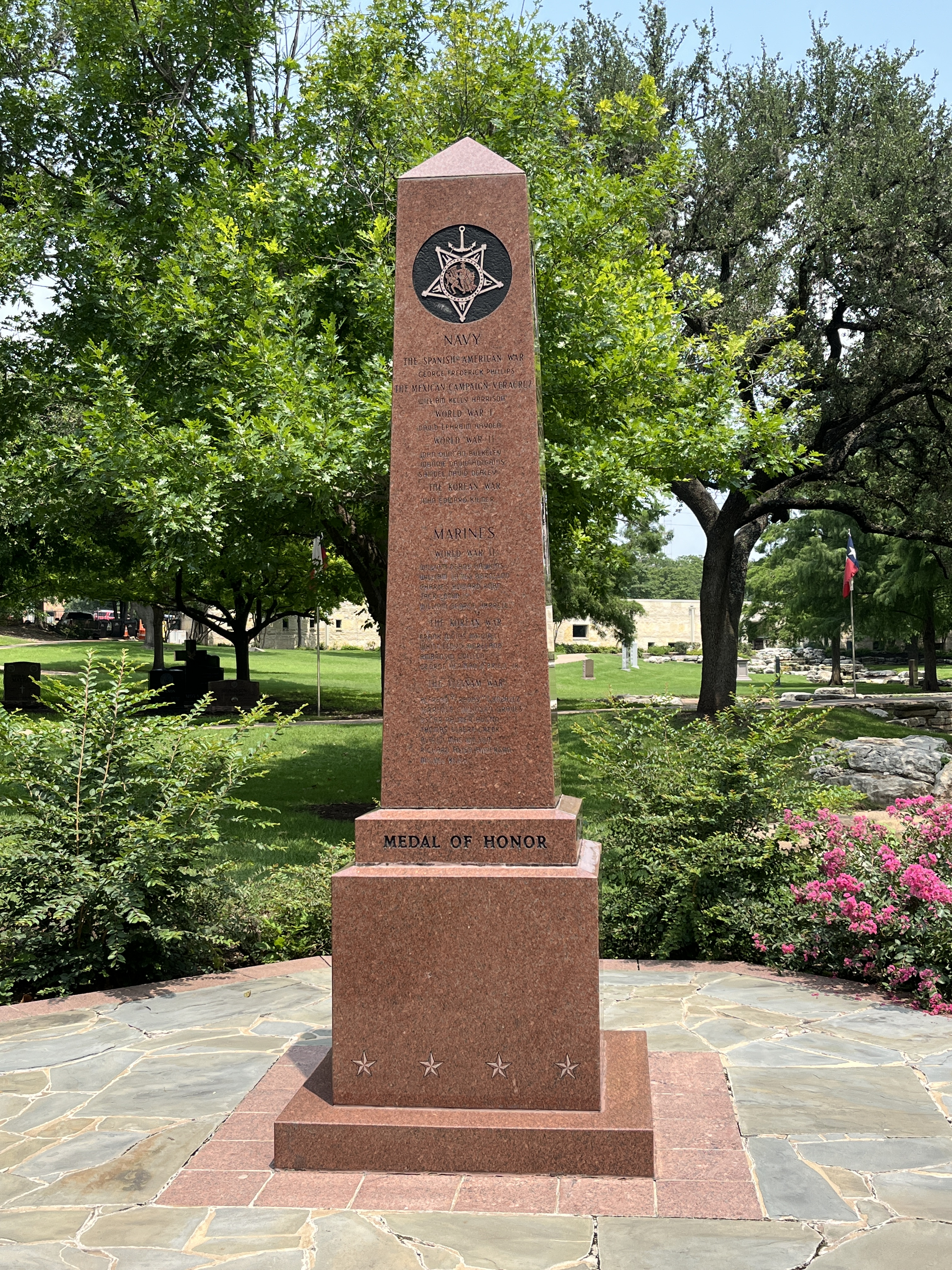
- The monument in 2024
- 30°15′58.6″N 97°43′33.5″W
- Location: Austin, Texas, U.S.

The Medal of Honor Monument is installed at the Texas State Cemetery in Austin, Texas. It was dedicated in 1999. The 13-foot tall obelisk is made of mountain red granite from Fredericksburg.
