= Gold Star Mothers Memorial =

Monument in Austin, Texas, U.S.

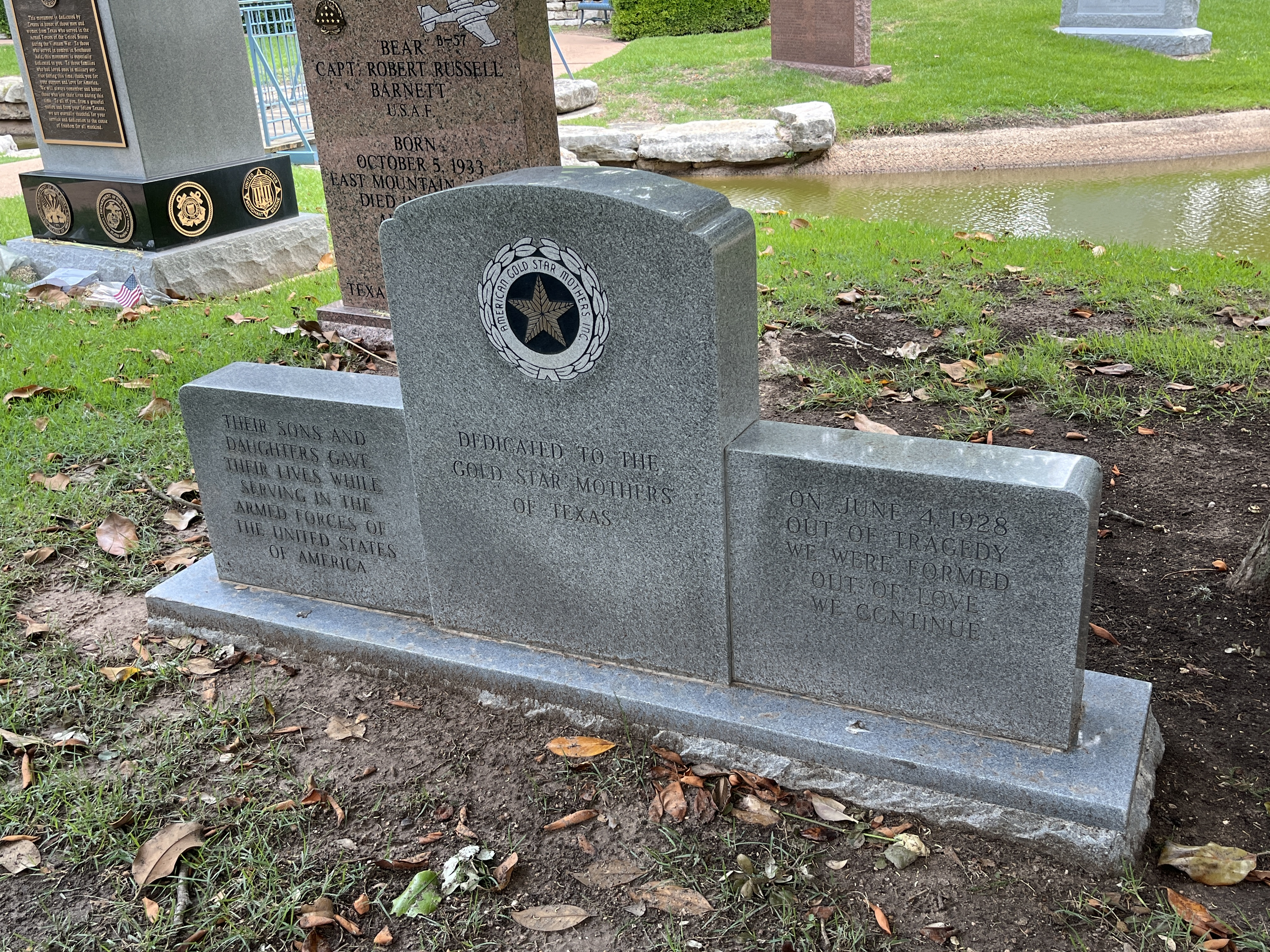
- The memorial in 2024
- Interactive map of Gold Star Mothers Memorial
- Location: Austin, Texas, U.S.
- Coordinates: 30°15′58.3″N 97°43′33.3″W
- Dedicated date: November 1, 2001

The Gold Star Mothers Memorial is installed at the Texas State Cemetery in Austin, Texas. The stone memorial was erected in 2001. It was dedicated on November 1, 2001 by Governor Rick Perry.
