= Yarbro =

Yarbro may refer to:

- Adela Yarbro Collins (born 1945), née Yarbro, American author and biblical scholar
- Chelsea Quinn Yarbro (1942–2025), American writer, notably of horror novels
- Jeff Yarbro (born 1977), American attorney and politician
- Yarbro, Arkansas, United States, an unincorporated community

== See also ==
- Yarborough (disambiguation)
