= Yarborough (disambiguation) =

Yarborough is a surname. Yarborough or Yarbrough may also refer to:

- Earl of Yarborough, a title in the Peerage of the United Kingdom
- USS Yarborough, a United States Navy destroyer launched in 1919 and decommissioned in 1930
- Yarborough (novel), a 1964 novel by B. H. Friedman
- Yarborough (bridge), a contract bridge term for a hand with no cards over a 9
- Yarbrough, Mississippi, United States, an unincorporated community

== See also ==
- Yarborough v. Alvarado, a 2004 United States Supreme Court case
- Yarborough v. Gentry, a 2003 United States Supreme Court per curiam opinion
- Ex parte Yarbrough, an 1884 United States Supreme Court decision
- Yarborough Street electric railway station, Grimsby, North East Lincolnshire, England
- Yarbro (disambiguation)
