= Victory in Europe and Victory in Japan Day Monument =

Memorial in Austin, Texas, U.S.

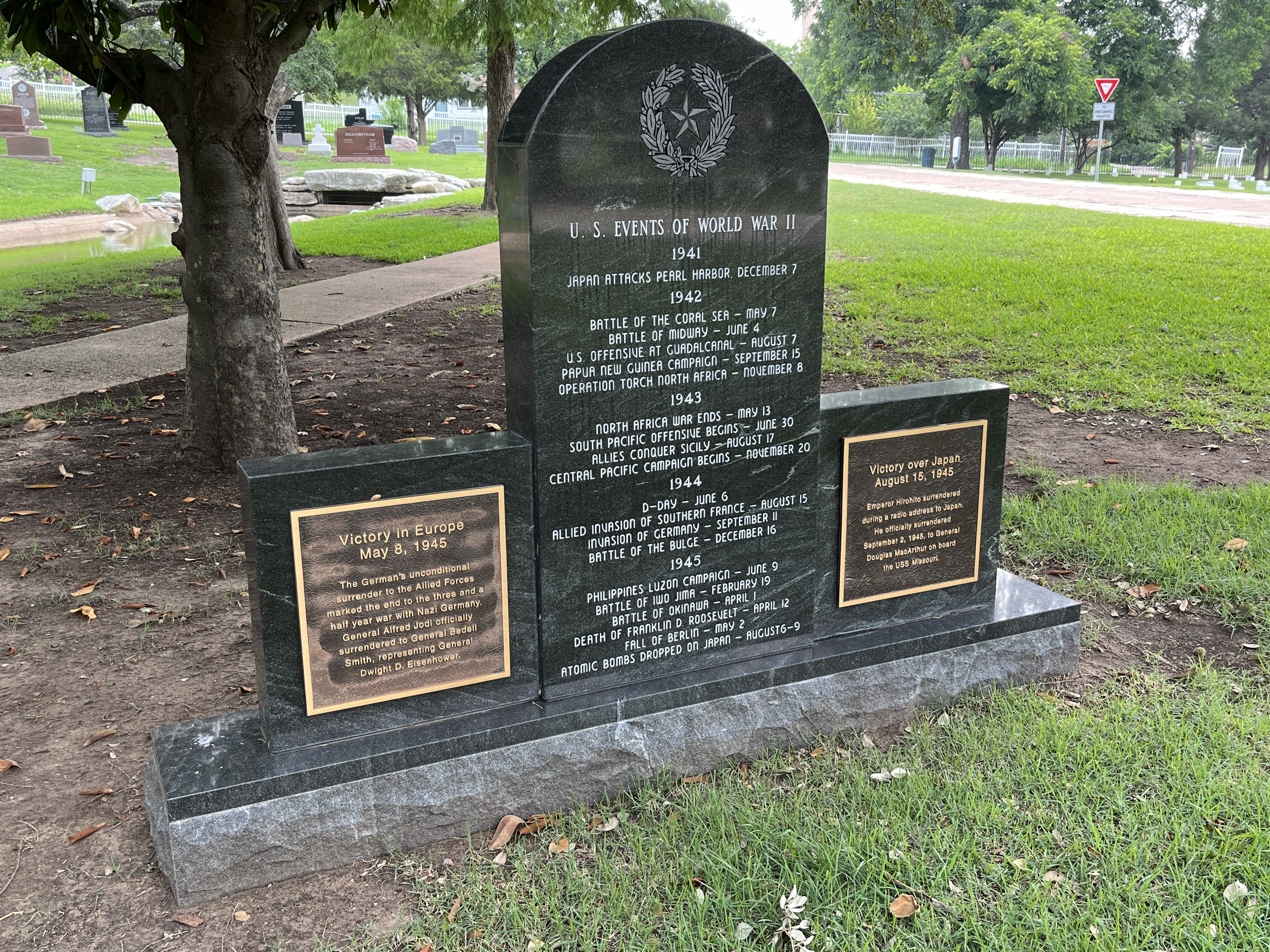
- The monument in 2024
- Interactive map of Victory in Europe and Victory in Japan Day Monument
- Location: Austin, Texas, U.S.
- Coordinates: 30°15′58″N 97°43′33.7″W

The Victory in Europe and Victory in Japan Day Monument is installed at the Texas State Cemetery in Austin, Texas. Dedicated on Veterans Day in 2005, the Ebony Mist granite monument has two bronze plaques and commemorates World War II veterans from Texas.
