= Matthew E. Yarbrough =

American lawyer

- Born: Matthew Elliott Yarbrough
- Occupation: Attorney
- Years active: 1993–present

Matthew E. Yarbrough is an American lawyer and a former Assistant United States Attorney for the North District of Texas, where he was the lead prosecutor in several notable alien smuggling, illegal immigration and cyber hacking cases. He is now the founder and Managing Partner of Yarbrough Blackstone Law in Dallas, Texas.

== The Yarbrough Law Group and Yarbrough Blackstone Law PLLC ==
As president of The Yarbrough Law Group and Yarbrough Strategic Advisors, Yarbrough has focused on intellectual property, cybercrime, corporate espionage, governance and compliance issues, internal investigations and financial fraud, as well as data security and data breach cases. Prominent clients have included Kinko's, for whom he helped in the prosecution of a cyber thief who used keylogging software to steal personal information from computers. For 7-Eleven, Yarbrough successfully prosecuted cyber hackers who had gained access to 7-Eleven's bank-machine network. At YSA, Yarbrough's managing director of investigations is A.J. Irwin, a former federal agent with whom Yarbrough worked closely on several prominent alien smuggling and immigration cases while an assistant U.S. attorney.

Because of his work in the field of Data Privacy & Cybersecurity, Intellectual Property, and Criminal Law, He has been a regular legal analyst on ABC News, CNN, MSNBC, Wall Street Journal and elsewhere. He previously headed the Cybercrimes and Criminal Intellectual Property Task Force for the Department of Justice and was tapped by former Texas Attorney General John Cornyn as Special Counsel to assist in the creation of the Texas Internet Bureau— whose mission is fighting computer fraud, data breach, telecommunications fraud and property crimes.

== Prosecutions as Assistant U.S. Attorney ==
=== Operation Seek and Keep ===
In 1998, Yarbrough was a lead prosecutor in Operation Seek and Keep, a year-long investigation by the INS that succeeded in discovering and breaking up what then United States Attorney General Janet Reno described as the "largest alien smuggling organization to ever be completely dismantled." Operation Seek and Keep was the first investigation authorized to use wiretapping technology in an illegal immigrant smuggling case, as approved by the Illegal Immigration Reform and Immigrant Responsibility Act of 1996, and was the first to use money-laundering statutes to dismantle an alien smuggling operation and seize its assets. The investigation broke an international alien smuggling and money-laundering ring that brought in an estimated 10,000 illegal aliens to the United States at a cost of $20,000 per alien, generating more than $200 million in proceeds over a 3-year period. The organization smuggled aliens who were nationals of India, Afghanistan, Pakistan, and Syria. The operation most often started in India and went to Moscow, where connecting flights allowed aliens to travel to Latin American or the Caribbean. Aliens would then either fly or take a boat ride into the Miami, area or walk across the Mexican border. Once in the U.S., the immigrants were kept in "stash houses" where they were kept under lock and key. Operation Seek and Keep was the first investigation authorized to use wiretapping technology in an international illegal immigrant smuggling case, as approved by the Illegal Immigration Reform and Immigrant Responsibility Act of 1996, and was the first to use money-laundering statutes to dismantle an alien smuggling cartel's operations and seize millions of dollars of its assets.

=== globalHell Prosecution ===
Yarbrough led the prosecution of the globalHell organization, a band of computer hackers whose activities included hacking into a company's Web site, then extorting protection money from the victims. The group also committed numerous acts of teleconferencing fraud against victims including AT&T, MCI, and Latitude Communications and gained accessed to and damaged protected computers belonging to the U.S. Army, the White House, U.S. Cellular, Ameritech and others. As a result of the investigation, GlobalHell member Patrick Gregory, also known as "MostHateD," pleaded guilty to conspiracy to commit telecommunications fraud and computer hacking.

== Personal ==
Yarbrough is a graduate of Southern Methodist University School of Law, where he was an editor of the SMU Law Review and Mock Trial Champion, and of Texas Christian University. He has received the Department of Justice Outstanding Prosecutor Award, the FBI's Outstanding Prosecutor Award, as well as the North Texas Computer Forensics Laboratory Award for Outstanding Efforts in the creation of its forensics lab.
