= Purple Heart Monument =

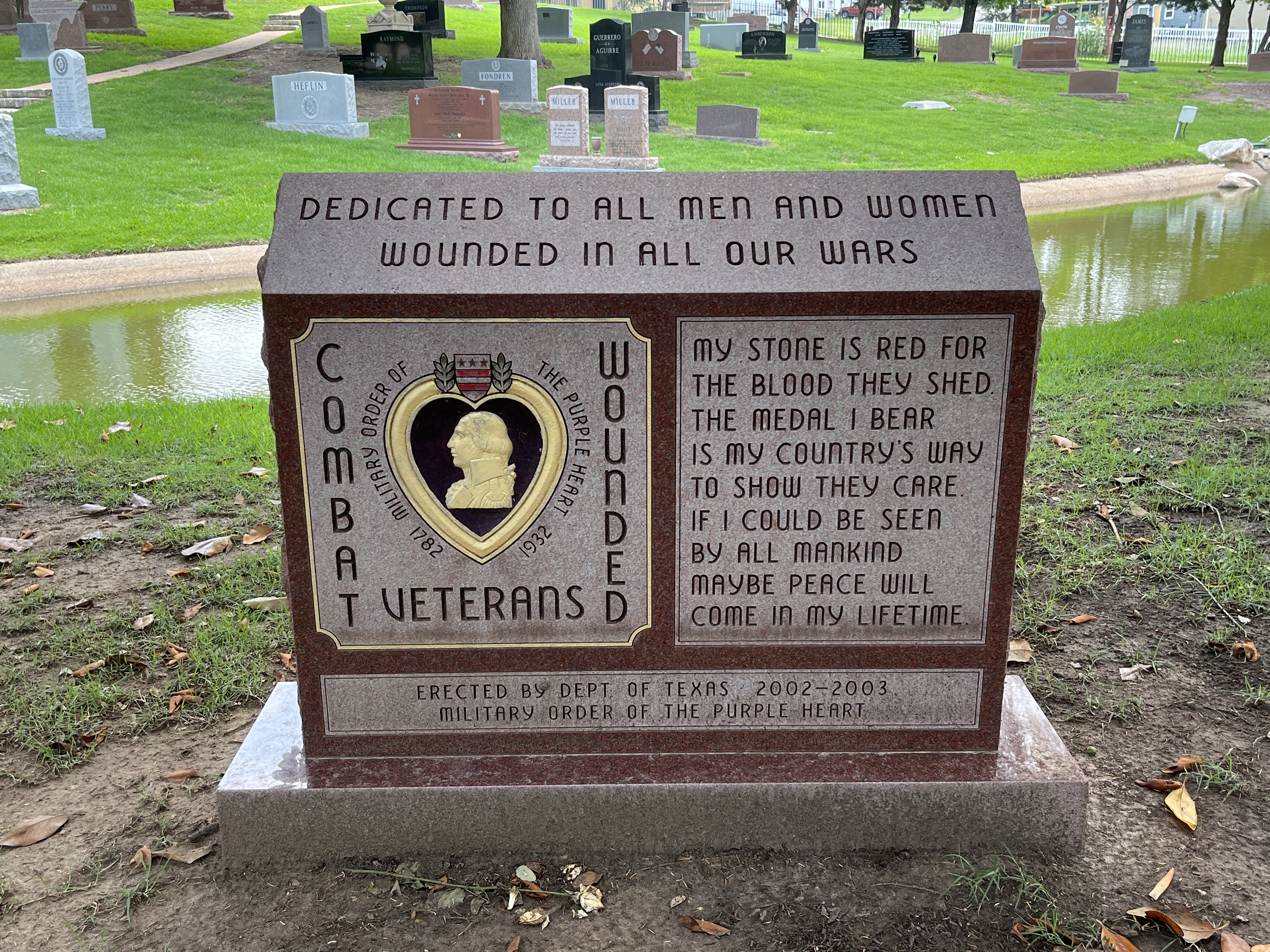
- The monument in 2024
- 30°15′57.9″N 97°43′33.1″W
- Location: Austin, Texas, U.S.

The Purple Heart Monument is installed at the Texas State Cemetery in Austin, Texas. Commemorating Texans who were wounded during active duty, the monument was dedicated by Lieutenant Governor David Dewhurst on September 20, 2003. It was donated to the people of Texas by the Military Order of the Purple Heart.
