= Charley Lockhart =

Texas State Treasurer from 1931 to 1941

Charley R. Lockhart (August 1876 - 1954) was Texas State Treasurer from 1931 until 1941. He was the shortest Texas elected official at 3'9" (114 cm) tall.

== Early life ==
Lockhart born in Dallas County, Texas, in August 1876 to John C. R. and Lucretia Lockhart. They moved to Snyder, Texas, in 1898.

== Career ==
Lockhart was elected Scurry County treasurer in 1900. He held the office for 16 years. In 1919 he went to Austin to work with the sergeant-at-arms of the Texas House of Representatives.

In 1930 he was elected state treasurer. In 1931, Ripley's Believe It Or Not featured a drawing of Lockhart under the caption "Texas, the largest state in the Union, has the smallest treasurer, Charley Lockhart, 45 inches tall." The Houston Post interviewed Lockhart when he entered the race for the state treasurer's office, and he is quoted as saying, "I want you to make it perfectly clear that I am fighting this battle on manhood alone," he said. "I don't want the votes that are given me through a feeling that life has not handed me a square deal. Life has been good to me. I have filled public office, earned the confidence and friendship of my fellows and educated my children. . . . I'm simply a little man with big ideas and sufficient experience and ability to carry my ideas out..."

He resigned his office on October 24, 1941, and was replaced by his Deputy Jesse James.

== Death and interment ==
Lockhart died in 1954 and was buried in the Snyder Cemetery.

== Other media ==
- A newsreel showing the swearing-in of Lockhart is available

Party political offices
Preceded by W. Gregory Hatcher	Democratic nominee for Texas State Treasurer; 1930, 1932, 1934, 1936, 1938, 1940	Succeeded by Jesse James
Political offices
Preceded by W. Gregory Hatcher	Texas State Treasurer; 1931–1941	Succeeded by Jesse James
