= Daniel Webster Roberts =

American soldier (1841–1935)

- Born: October 10, 1841; Winston County, Mississippi, US
- Died: February 6, 1935 (aged 93); Austin, Texas, US
- Burial place: Texas State Cemetery
- Military career
- Allegiance: Confederate States
- Branch: Confederate States Army
- Rank: Private
- Unit: 36th Texas Cavalry Regiment
- Wars: American Civil War; American Indian Wars

Daniel Webster Roberts (October 10, 1841 – February 6, 1935) was a Confederate veteran, and deserter, of the American Civil War, and a noted Texas Ranger.

== Sources ==
- Cutrer, Thomas W. (January 19, 2019). "Roberts, Daniel Webster (1841–1935)". Handbook of Texas Online. Texas State Historical Association.
- "Indian Fighter And Ex-Captain of Rangers Dies". The Austin American. February 6, 1935. p. 1.
