= Jesse James (Texas politician) =

American politician (1904–1977)

Texas State Treasurer
- In office October 25, 1941 – September 29, 1977
- Governor: Coke R. Stevenson; Beauford H. Jester; Allan Shivers; Price Daniel; John Connally; Preston Smith; Dolph Briscoe
- Preceded by: Charley Lockhart
- Succeeded by: Warren G. Harding

Member of the Texas House of Representatives from the 65th district
- In office January 10, 1933 – September 1, 1937
- Preceded by: James J. Elliot
- Succeeded by: Henry G. Lehman

Personal details
- Born: Jesse William James; October 10, 1904 Milam County, Texas, U.S.
- Died: September 29, 1977 (aged 72) Austin, Texas
- Resting place: Texas State Cemetery; Austin, Texas
- Party: Democratic
- Spouse: Zana Bell
- Children: Doris James
- Parent(s): John A. James; Delia James

Jesse William James (October 10, 1904 – September 29, 1977) was an American politician from Texas. A member of the Democratic Party, James served as Texas State Treasurer from 1941 until his death in 1977. His near 36-year tenure made him the longest serving Texas State Treasurer.

James served in the Texas House of Representatives from 1933 to 1937, when he resigned to accept a position in the office of the state treasurer. When the incumbent state treasurer, Charley Lockhart, resigned due to poor health, Governor Coke R. Stevenson appointed James to the office. James continued to be reelected as state treasurer until he died in office. He was succeeded by Warren G. Harding, whom James had defeated for reelection in 1956.

== Early life ==
James was born on October 10, 1904, in Sand Grove, south of Milano, Texas, in Milam County, to John A. and Delia James. Jesse was one of 11 children. His father worked on a local railroad and was called "Jesse James" by his associates; as a result, he decided to name his son after the bank- and train-robber.

James was raised in Thorndale, Texas. His father died when he was young, and Jesse assisted his mother in raising his ten siblings. He graduated from college with a degree in business administration and graduated from Jefferson Law School. He became a merchant in his home county.

== Career ==
In 1932, James was nominated by the Democratic Party for the Texas House of Representatives seat for District 65, representing parts of Milam, Burleson, and Lee counties. He won the election, and was sworn into the House in 1933. He was reelected twice. In 1937, Charley Lockhart, the Texas State Treasurer, appointed James as the first assistant chief clerk. James resigned from the Texas House to take the role on September 1.

In October 1941, Lockhart resigned from office due to poor health. Coke R. Stevenson, the Governor of Texas, appointed James to succeed him on October 25. 1941. In James' first election as Texas State Treasurer in 1942, he finished in second place out of five candidates in the primary election, but emerged victorious in the runoff election. In 1950, he was selected as the first vice president of the National Association of State Auditors, Comptrollers and Treasurers. Later in his career, he was criticized for keeping the state's funds in checking accounts rather than savings accounts, with one political challenger claiming that this cost the state an estimated $91 million in interest.

James faced few strong challenges for reelection after his initial election in 1942, often running unopposed in the general election as no Republican Party candidate would file to run against him. He was challenged by Warren G. Harding, then the county treasurer for Dallas County in the Democratic primary in 1956, who James defeated. James drew Democratic and Republican challengers in 1974, receiving only 54% of the vote in the Democratic primary that year due to the strong challenge from Don Yarbrough. In total, James was re-elected 18 times, a Texas state record.

== Personal life ==
James married Mary Zana Belle, who was from Mansfield, Texas, and worked as a teacher in Thorndale. They lived in Milam County, and had a daughter named Doris and two grandchildren. James also sold boats and developed the Lake Travis Lodges.

Later in life, James developed health complications. He had diabetes, causing poor blood circulation and had two amputations performed on his left leg: around the calf muscle in December 1976 and above the knee in January 1977. He was hospitalized at Seton Medical Center in Austin, Texas, on September 19. He suffered a fatal heart attack on September 29, and was buried in the Texas State Cemetery in Austin.

Texas House of Representatives
Preceded by James J. Elliot	Member of the Texas House of Representatives from District 65 (Cameron); 1933–1937	Succeeded by Henry G. Lehman
Party political offices
Preceded by Charley Lockhart	Democratic nominee for Texas State Treasurer; 1942, 1944, 1946, 1948, 1950, 1952, 1954, 1956, 1958, 1960, 1962, 1964, 1966, 1968, 1970, 1972, 1974	Succeeded by Warren G. Harding
Preceded by Dahl Darden	Republican nominee for Texas State Treasurer; 1952	Vacant Title next held by Allen Lacy
Political offices
Preceded by Charley Lockhart	Texas State Treasurer; 1941–1977	Succeeded by Warren Harding
