= John Holt Duncan =

American judge

- Born: July 7, 1820; Cynthiana, Kentucky, US
- Died: May 27, 1896 (aged 75); Austin, Texas, US
- Burial place: Texas State Cemetery
- Education: Miami University, A.B and M.A.
- Occupations: Lawyer and judge
- Known for: founder of Beta Theta Pi

John Holt Duncan (July 7, 1820 – May 27, 1896) was one a founder of Beta Theta Pi, a prominent college fraternity founded at Miami University in 1839 and was its first president. He made a career as a lawyer and judge in Houston and Bexar County, Texas.

== Early life ==
Duncan was born in Cynthiana, Kentucky to John Hicks Duncan and Pauline Randolph Holt. He grew up in Mississippi. He attended Miami University where he studied law and graduated with an A.B and M.A. in 1840. While there, he was one of eight founders of Beta Theta Pi fraternity and served as its first president.

== Career ==
After college, he was admitted to the bar. He moved to Houston, Texas where he practiced law. He became Chief Justice of Bexar County, Texas from 1857 to 1862.

Duncan served as a Confederate Artillery Captain in the 31st Texas Cavalry during the Civil War. He lost a leg as a result of a battle wound on September 20, 1862, at the First Battle of Newtonia. When the Confederates retreated, the still-recovering Duncan was taken in by farmer and his wife. When he was discovered by the Union troops, the soldiers executed the farmer for aiding the enemy. The farmer's widow and children begged for Duncan's life, saving the injured man's life. They nursed him back to health and, then, helped get him back to the Confederates, some 200 miles south through enemy territory. Duncan spent the rest of his life caring for the family and educating the children; he died penniless as a result.

After the war, Duncan returned to Texas. He was a district justice from 1864 to 1865 and a city attorney for Houston from 1877 to 1879.

== Personal life ==
He died in the Confederate Old Soldier's Home in Austin, Texas in 1896 and was buried in the Confederate Veterans section of the Texas State Cemetery. Duncan's prosthetic leg is on display at the national headquarters of Beta Theta Pi at Oxford, Ohio.

== See also ==
- List of Beta Theta Pi members
