= Black Legislators Monument =

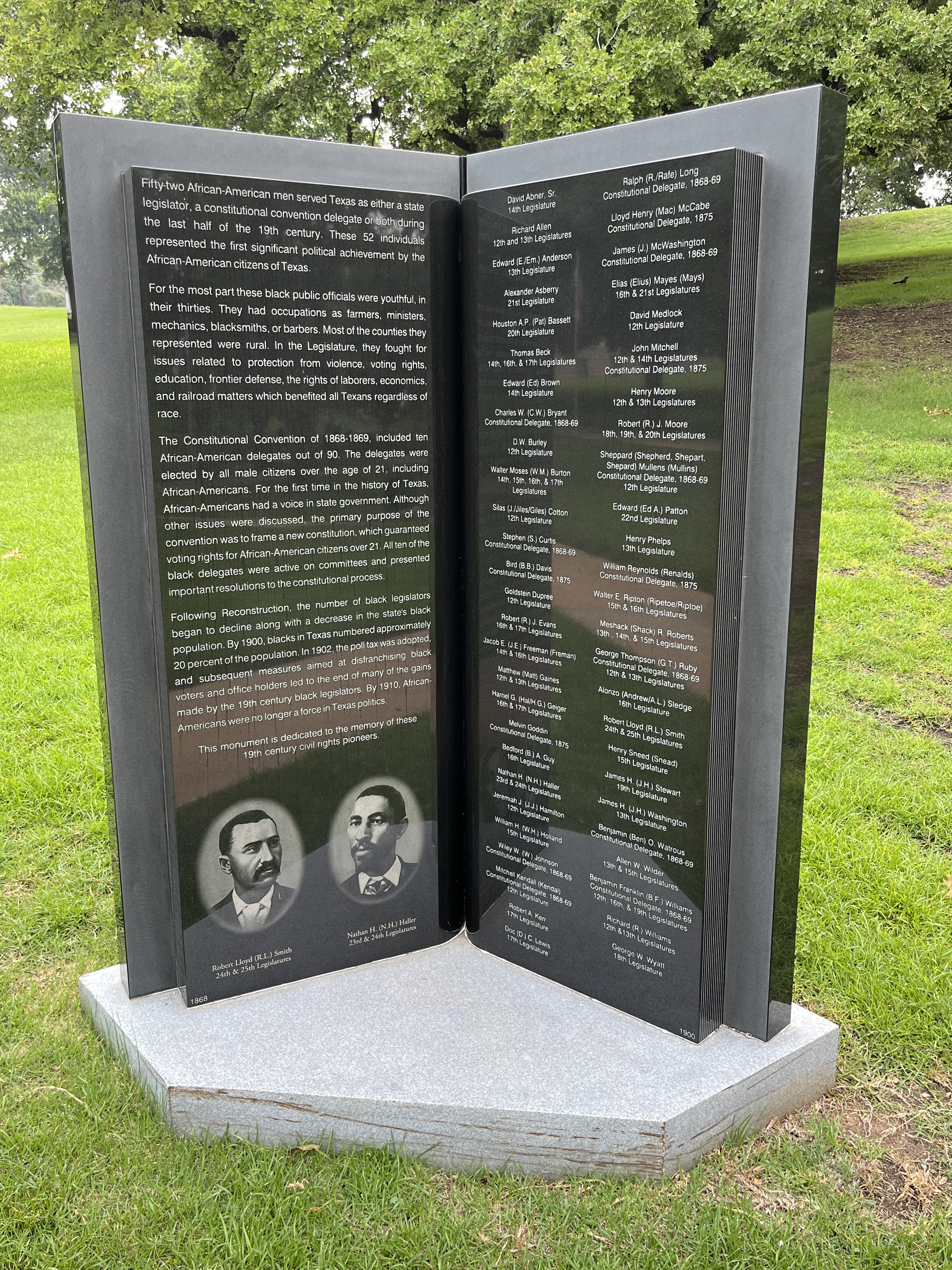
- The monument in 2024
- 30°16′1.3″N 97°43′32.6″W
- Location: Austin, Texas, U.S.

The Black Legislators Monument is a black marble memorial installed at the Texas State Cemetery in Austin, Texas. It commemorates fifty-two African American men who served in the Texas Constitutional Convention and the Texas Legislature during the Reconstruction era. Among those who attended the monument's unveiling in March 2010 were Texas Speaker of the House Joe Straus, State Senator Rodney Ellis, and Wilhelmina Delco, who was the first African-American to represent District 50 in the Texas Legislature.
