= Aristocrat Leisure =

Australian gambling machine manufacturer

Aristocrat Leisure Limited
- Type: Public
- Traded as: ASX: ALL
- Industry: Gambling, video games
- Founded: 1953; 73 years ago
- Founder: Leonard Ainsworth
- Headquarters: Sydney, New South Wales, Australia
- Key people: Trevor Croker (CEO)
- Revenue: ▲ A$6.30 billion (2025)
- Net income: ▲ A$1.55 billion normalized NPATA (2025)
- Number of employees: 7,400
- Subsidiaries: Video Gaming Technologies; Product Madness
- Website: www.aristocrat.com

Aristocrat Leisure Limited is an Australian gambling machine manufacturer, which has its administrative and research headquarters in the Sydney suburb of North Ryde. It has marketing and development offices in the United Kingdom, Europe and the United States. The company develops and supplies electronic gambling machines, casino management systems, online real-money gambling technology, iLottery products, and social casino games.

Aristocrat is the largest gambling machine manufacturer in Australia, and one of the largest manufacturers of slot machines in the world, second only to International Game Technology.

Aristocrat is listed on the Australian Securities Exchange under the ticker symbol ALL.

== History ==
The company produced their first machine in 1953 and was listed on the Australian Stock Exchange in 1996. The company was founded by Leonard Ainsworth, whose family maintains a substantial stake in the company. Ainsworth is now chairman of a different gambling company, Ainsworth Game Technology. Aristocrat is licensed to distribute slot machines and other gambling products in over 200 jurisdictions (note that many countries, including Australia, have a number of different gambling-license jurisdictions).

Aristocrat's CEO blamed the US subprime mortgage crisis for poor financial results in 2008, despite competing companies experiencing record growth in the same period. As a result of the expected drop in revenue, the CEO enacted sweeping budget cuts, including large-scale retrenchments of staff from all areas of the business. For the 12 months to December 2009, the company reported a net loss of A$157.8 million.

In 2011, Aristocrat reached an agreement with the Alberta Gaming, Liquor and Cannabis to provide equipment and games for Alberta's video lottery terminal network.

In July 2014, Aristocrat agreed to buy gambling machine provider Video Gaming Technologies for about US$1.28 billion to triple its North American business amid falling profit in Australia.

On 10 August 2017, the company acquired mobile game developer Plarium for $500 million to enter into mobile gambling.

On 30 November 2017, Aristocrat acquired mobile game developer Big Fish Games for US$990 million.

Trevor Croker became chief executive officer of Aristocrat in March 2017, succeeding Jamie Odell.

In July 2019, Aristocrat filed legal action against Ainsworth Game Technology, alleging misuse of proprietary code and media assets connected to its Lightning Link games.

In 2021, Aristocrat received Global Gaming Awards, including recognition in land-based product, land-based supplier, and slot product categories.

In October 2021, Aristocrat announced a bid to acquire Playtech for US$3,7 billion. The proposal was later rejected by Playtech shareholders. In May 2022, Aristocrat announced plans to launch an online casino business. Aristocrat further announced a A$500 million on-market share buyback after the Playtech bid did not proceed.

In May 2023, Aristocrat announced an agreement to acquire NeoGames for about US$1 billion. The acquisition was completed in April 2024, and NeoGames was combined with Anaxi to form Aristocrat Interactive.

In February 2025, Aristocrat completed the sale of Plarium Global to Modern Times Group. The sale followed a review of Aristocrat's casual and mid-core gambling portfolio.

In January 2026, Aristocrat and Light & Wonder settled litigation in Australia and the United States concerning Light & Wonder's Dragon Train and Jewel of the Dragon titles. Under the settlement, Light & Wonder agreed to pay Aristocrat US$127.5 million and cease commercialization of the disputed games globally.

== Products and partnerships ==
Aristocrat develops electronic gambling machines, casino management systems, electronic table games, linked jackpot systems, online real-money gambling technology, iLottery products, and social casino games.

Aristocrat produces linked progressive jackpot games, including the Lightning Link series.

Aristocrat has entered distribution and licensing agreements in markets, including a former distribution relationship with Sammy Corporation in Japan and licensing arrangements for video lottery terminals in the United States.

Aristocrat entered into a licensing agreement with the National Football League to produce NFL-themed slot machines and virtual sports games. The company later shows NFL-themed slot products at the Global Gaming Expo in Las Vegas. Aristocrat later entered team-level sponsorship agreements with the New England Patriots and the Dallas Cowboys connected to its NFL gaming products.

=== Video Gaming Technologies ===
Video Gaming Technologies is an American supplier of gambling machines. VGT was founded in 1991 in Franklin, Tennessee by Jon Yarbrough. VGT was privately owned, until it was bought in October 2014 by Aristocrat Leisure for about US$1.3 billion, increasing its gambling machines in North America from 8,200 to 28,400. VGT develops casino games for Class II gaming markets in the U.S.

== Leadership ==
In December 2024, Aristocrat announced that Craig Toner would succeed Hector Fernandez as chief executive officer of Aristocrat Gaming, the company's land-based gambling unit.

== Legal Matters ==
In 2019, Aristocrat filed legal action against Ainswoth Game Technology, alleging misuse of proprietary code and media assets connected to its Lightning Link games.

In January 2026, Aristocrat and Light & Wonder settled litigation in Australia and the United States concerning Light & Wonder's Dragon Train and Jewel of the Dragon titles. Under the settlement, Light & Wonder agreed to pay Aristocrat US$127.5 million and cease commercialization of the disputed game globally.
