= Texas Armed Forces Memorial Flagpole =

Memorial in Austin, Texas, U.S.

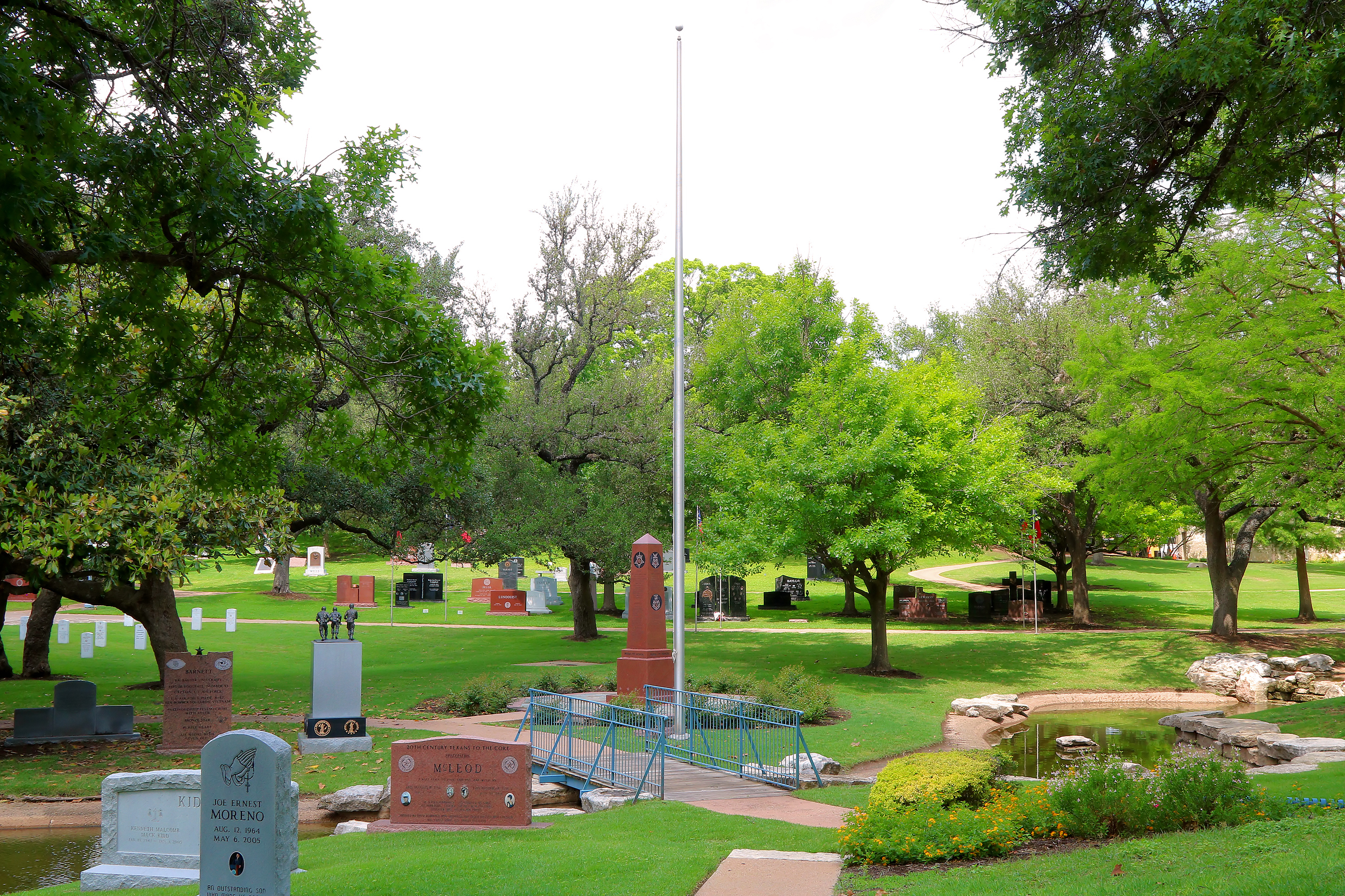
- Location: Austin, Texas, U.S.
- Coordinates: 30°15′58.6″N 97°43′33.3″W

The Texas Armed Forces Memorial Flagpole is installed at Texas State Cemetery in Austin, Texas, United States. Its installation was authorized by the passage of Senate Bill 2135 during the 2009 Legislative Session. The flag is lowered to half staff when a Texan is killed during military duty.
