= September 11, 2001 Monument =

Memorial in Austin, Texas, U.S.

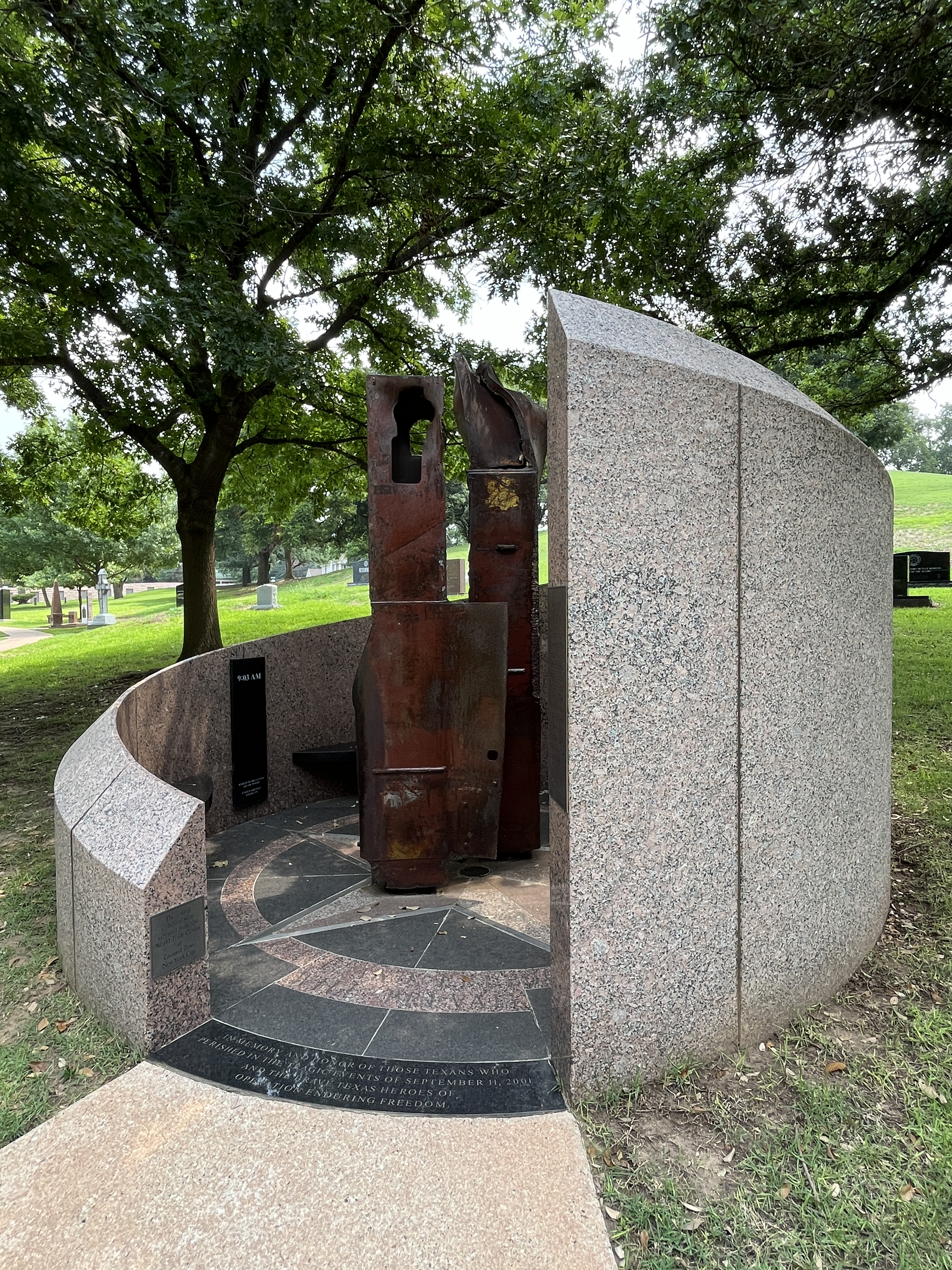
- The monument in 2024
- 30°15′59.7″N 97°43′33.1″W
- Location: Austin, Texas, U.S.

The September 11, 2001 Monument is installed at the Texas State Cemetery in Austin, Texas. Designed by O'Connell, Robertson and Associates of Austin, the memorial commemorates victims of the September 11 attacks and Operation Enduring Freedom. It was commissioned by Governor Rick Perry in 2002 and unveiled in 2003. The monument includes two steel columns from Ground Zero.

== See also ==
- Memorials and services for the September 11 attacks
