= Edward Armon Sieker =

American lawman (c.1853–1901)

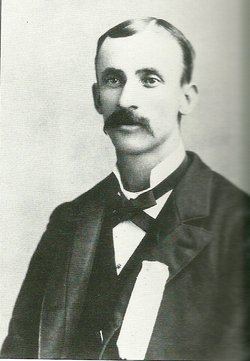

Edward Armon Sieker Jr. (c. 1853 – 1901), sometimes styled Ed A. Sieker in print, was an American lawman and a Texas Ranger. In his time with the Rangers, he was involved in a number of gunfights with Native Americans and outlaws. His three brothers, including Lamartine Pemberton Sieker, were also Texas Rangers.

== Sources ==
- Parsons, Chuck (April 30, 2009). "The Sieker Brothers: A Quartet of Texas Rangers" (PDF). Texas Ranger Dispatch: 1–8.
- Roth, Michael P. (2001). "Sieker, Edward Armon, Jr.". Historical Dictionary of Law Enforcement. Westport, CT: Greenwood Press. p. 323. ISBN 9780313305603.
