= David Rivera (attorney) =

American lawyer

United States Attorney for the Middle District of Tennessee
- In office November 11, 2013 – March 10, 2017
- President: Barack Obama; Donald Trump
- Preceded by: Jerry E. Martin
- Succeeded by: Jack Smith

Personal details
- Education: Oral Roberts University (BS); Pace University (JD)

Military service
- Branch/service: United States Air Force

David Rivera is an American lawyer who served as U.S. attorney for the Middle District of Tennessee from 2013 to 2017.
