= Ed Yarbrough =

American lawyer

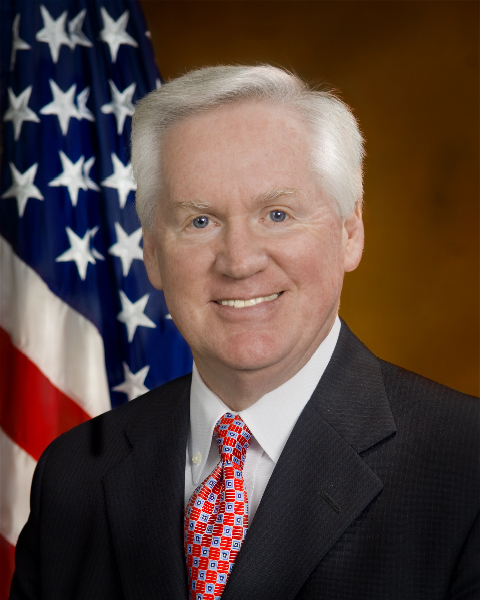
- Official portrait of Yarbrough, 2007

United States Attorney for the Middle District of Tennessee
- In office October 10, 2007 – May 21, 2010
- President: George W. Bush; Barack Obama
- Preceded by: James K. Vines
- Succeeded by: Jerry E. Martin

Personal details
- Born: Edward Meacham Yarbrough; 1943 (age 82–83)
- Party: Republican
- Education: Rhodes College (BA); Vanderbilt University (JD)
- Occupation: Lawyer

Military service
- Allegiance: United States
- Branch/service: United States Army
- Years of service: 1969–1971
- Rank: First lieutenant
- Unit: 3rd Infantry Regiment; Military Assistance Command, Vietnam
- Battles/wars: Vietnam War
- Awards: Bronze Star Medal

Edward Meacham Yarbrough (born 1943) is an American lawyer who served as the United States Attorney for the Middle District of Tennessee from 2007 to 2010. Previously an assistant district attorney in Nashville and private practice criminal defense attorney, he was nominated as U.S. Attorney by President George W. Bush and confirmed by the United States Senate, with the support of Tennessee senators Lamar Alexander and Bob Corker.

Yarbrough later returned to private practice. His clients have included Cyntoia Brown, who he successfully obtained a commutation for in 2019 after her case had drawn national attention, and Glen Casada, a former Speaker of the Tennessee House of Representatives charged with federal bribery and money laundering offenses in 2022.
