= James Austin Sylvester =

James Austin Sylvester (1807-1882) was the Texian soldier who captured Antonio López de Santa Anna on April 22, 1836, the day after the Battle of San Jacinto.

== Santa Anna's capture ==
As a captain in Sidney Sherman's Kentucky Riflemen, he was the standard-bearer for the only flag flown during the battle. A printer's apprentice by trade, he had been born in 1807 in Baltimore, Maryland, before his parents relocated to Kentucky where he enlisted with Sherman to go to Texas and join the fight for independence. After the Kentucky Riflemen reached Gonzales on March 6, they joined with Sam Houston moving ahead of the Mexican army and training for the eventual engagement that ended with Santa Anna signing the Treaties of Velasco. Santa Anna's capture was accidental. When the battle broke out, Santa Anna deserted his men and fled on horseback. He was found by Sylvester at Vince Bayou wearing a private's uniform and hiding in the grass. Sylvester had been hunting for food and was initially unaware the person he had just captured was the leader of the Mexican army.

== Later life ==
Sylvester remained in Texas a few more years, but eventually moved to New Orleans to resume his chosen profession with The Picayune newspaper. After his April 9, 1882 death, he was buried in New Orleans. His body was later returned to Texas, and he is currently buried at the Texas State Cemetery in Austin, Texas.
