= Jerry E. Martin =

American lawyer

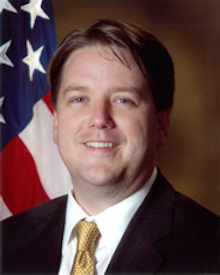
- Official portrait of Martin, 2010

United States Attorney for the Middle District of Tennessee
- In office May 21, 2010 – April 9, 2013
- President: Barack Obama
- Preceded by: Ed Yarbrough
- Succeeded by: David Rivera

Personal details
- Born: Gerald Edward Martin
- Spouse: Cynthia Ragan
- Education: Dartmouth College (BA); Stanford Law School (JD)
- Occupation: Lawyer

Gerald Edward "Jerry" Martin is an American attorney. He served as the United States Attorney for the Middle District of Tennessee.

== Education ==
Martin graduated from Dartmouth College in 1996 and from Stanford Law School in 1999.

== Legal career ==
From 1999 until 2000, Martin had been a litigation associate with Wyatt, Tarrant & Combs. From 2000 until 2003 he was a litigation associate at Bass, Berry & Sims. Before his confirmation as United States Attorney he was previously a partner at Barrett Johnston & Parsley from 2007 to 2010, he had been an associate at the same firm from 2003 until 2007.

== United States Attorney ==
On March 25, 2010 President Barack Obama nominated Martin to be the United States Attorney for the Middle District of Tennessee. On May 6, 2010 his nomination was advanced through the United States Senate Committee on the Judiciary. On May 12, 2010 his nomination was confirmed by voice vote.

== Post government career ==
After his departure as U.S. Attorney he has served as part of the faculty of Vanderbilt Law School. He returned to private practice, being a partner with Barrett, Johnston, Martin and Garrison, LLP.
