= Nine Men of Praha Monument =

Memorial in Austin, Texas, U.S.

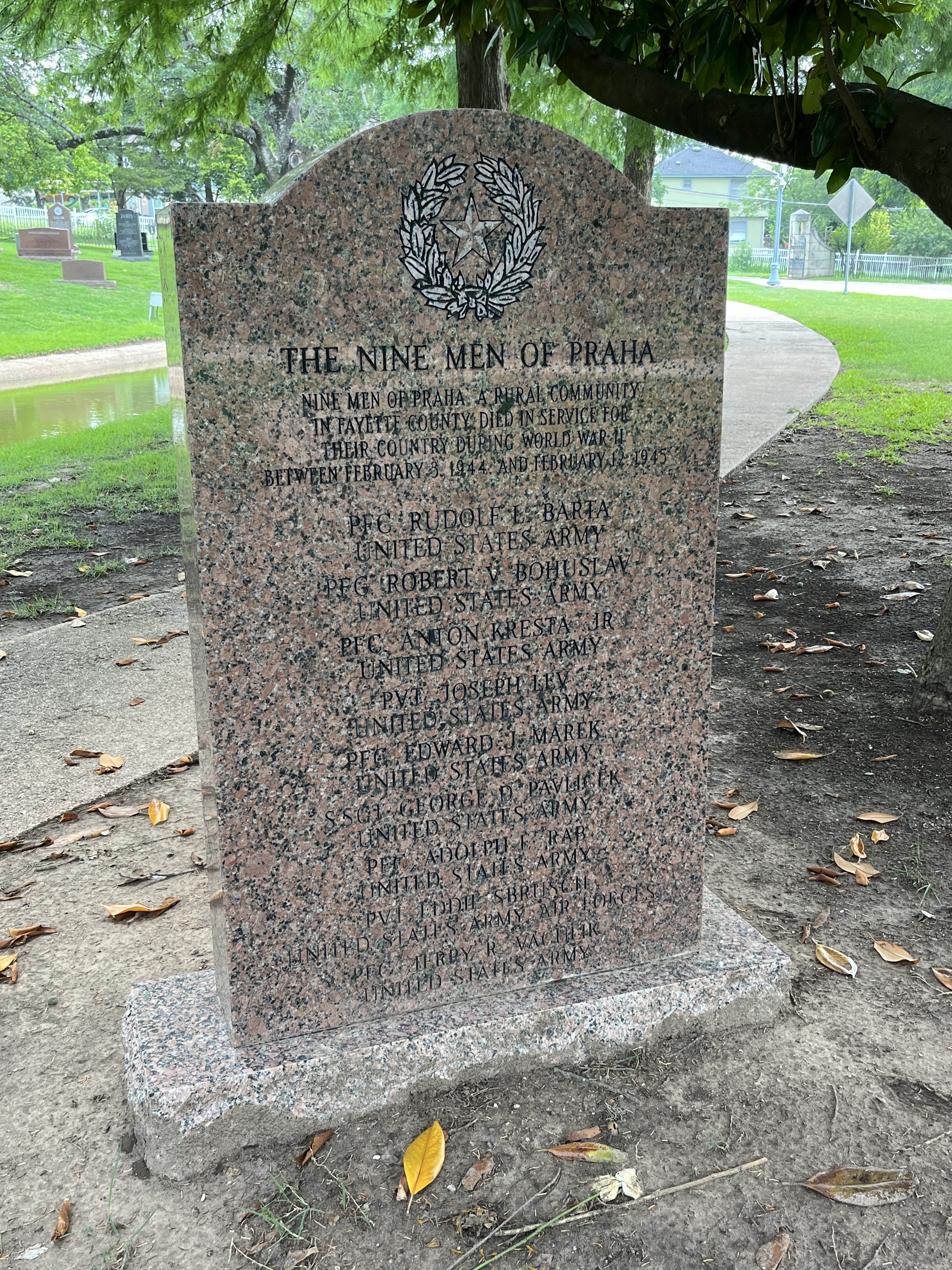
- The memorial in 2024
- 30°15′57.9″N 97°43′33.5″W
- Location: Austin, Texas, U.S.

The Nine Men of Praha Monument, or Praha Monument, is a pink granite memorial installed in the Texas State Cemetery in Austin, Texas. It was dedicated by U.S. Senator Kay Bailey Hutchison on November 11 (Veterans Day), 2002, to commemorate nine soldiers from Praha who died during World War II between February 3, 1944 and February 12, 1945.

Texas Monthly has called the monument the "most haunting" of those installed at the cemetery. In 2008, the magazine's Gary Cartwright wrote: "The cemetery staff recalled vividly the day in 2002 that the stone was dedicated, how nearly the entire township arrived on two chartered buses."

The memorial honors PFC Rudolf L. Barta, PFC Robert V. Bohuslav, PFC Anton Kresta, Jr., Pvt. Joseph Lev, United States Army, PFC Edward J. Marek, S.SGT George D. Pavlicek, PFC Adolph E. Rab, Pvt. Eddie Sbrusch, and PFC Jerry R. Vaculik.
