= George Malone Yarbrough =

American politician (1916-?)

George Malone Yarbrough (August 15, 1916 - ?) was a politician in Mississippi who served in the Mississippi House of Representatives between 1952–1956 and in the Mississippi State Senate between 1956–1968 and 1972–1980. He was a member of the Democratic Party.

Yarbrough was President Pro Tempore of the Mississippi Senate between 1960–1968. He also served as acting Lieutenant Governor in 1967.
