= Texas State Cemetery =

- U.S. National Register of Historic Places
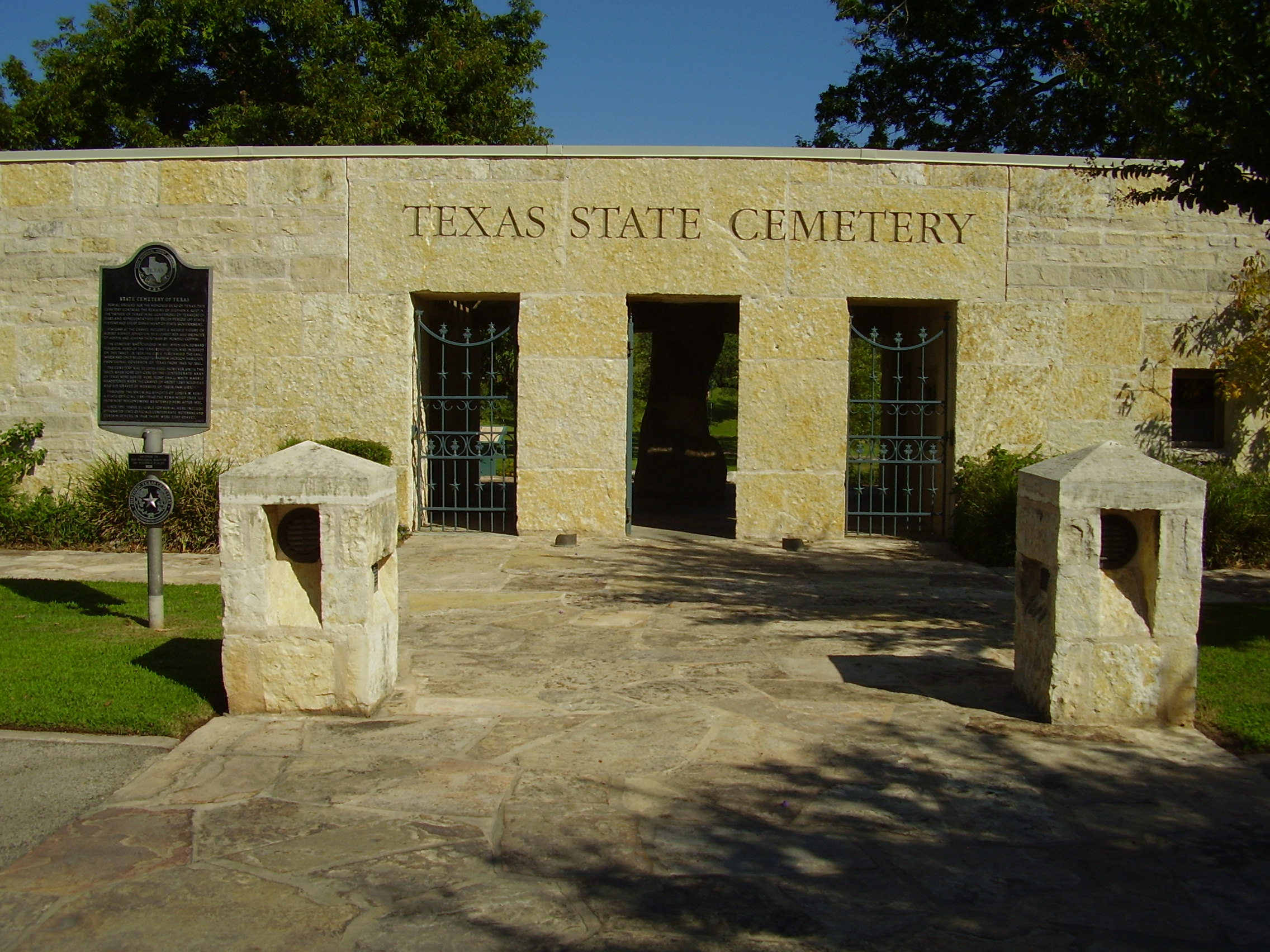
- Texas State Cemetery entrance
- Location: 901 Navasota Street; Austin, Texas, U.S.
- Coordinates: 30°16′01″N 97°43′34″W
- Built: 1851
- MPS: East Austin MRA
- NRHP reference No.: 86001085
- Added to NRHP: May 12, 1986

The Texas State Cemetery (TSC) is a cemetery located on about 22 acres (8.9 ha) just east of downtown Austin, the capital of the U.S. state of Texas. Originally the burial place of Edward Burleson, Texas Revolutionary general and vice-president of the Republic of Texas, it was expanded into a Confederate cemetery during the Civil War. Later it was expanded again to include the graves and cenotaphs of prominent Texans and their spouses.

It is a popular tourist attraction and colloquially referred to as the "Arlington of Texas" because of the renown of those interred and proximity to the seat of government.

The cemetery is divided into two sections. The smaller one contains around 900 graves of prominent Texans, while the larger has over 2,000 marked graves of Confederate veterans and widows. There is room for 7,500 interments; the cemetery is about half full, after including plots chosen by people who are eligible for burial.

== Burial guidelines ==
The guidelines on who may be buried within the Texas State Cemetery were first established in 1953, and are currently set by Texas state law. Currently, all persons to be buried in the cemetery must be one of the following:

- A former member of the legislature or a member who dies in office.
- A former elected state official or an official who dies in office (e.g., Governors of Texas, Lieutenant Governors of Texas, state Attorneys-General and departmental commissioners).
- State official appointed by the governor and confirmed by the Legislature who served at least 10 years in the office. After September 1, 2015, this criterion may be used only upon approval of the State Cemetery Committee if it finds the official made a significant contribution to Texas history.
- Individual designated by governor's proclamation, concurrent resolution of the Legislature, or order of the State Cemetery Committee; but only after approval of the committee if it finds the individual made a significant contribution to Texas history. The statute as written permits the committee to deny burial under this criterion even if requested by the governor or Legislature.
- The spouse of anyone meeting the above criteria.
- The child of an eligible member, but only if he or she was dependent on another due to a long-standing physical or mental condition during the lifetime of one of the child's parents.

== History ==
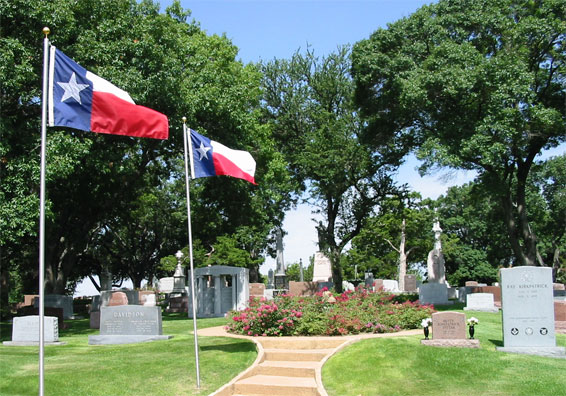
Texas flags flying at the cemetery

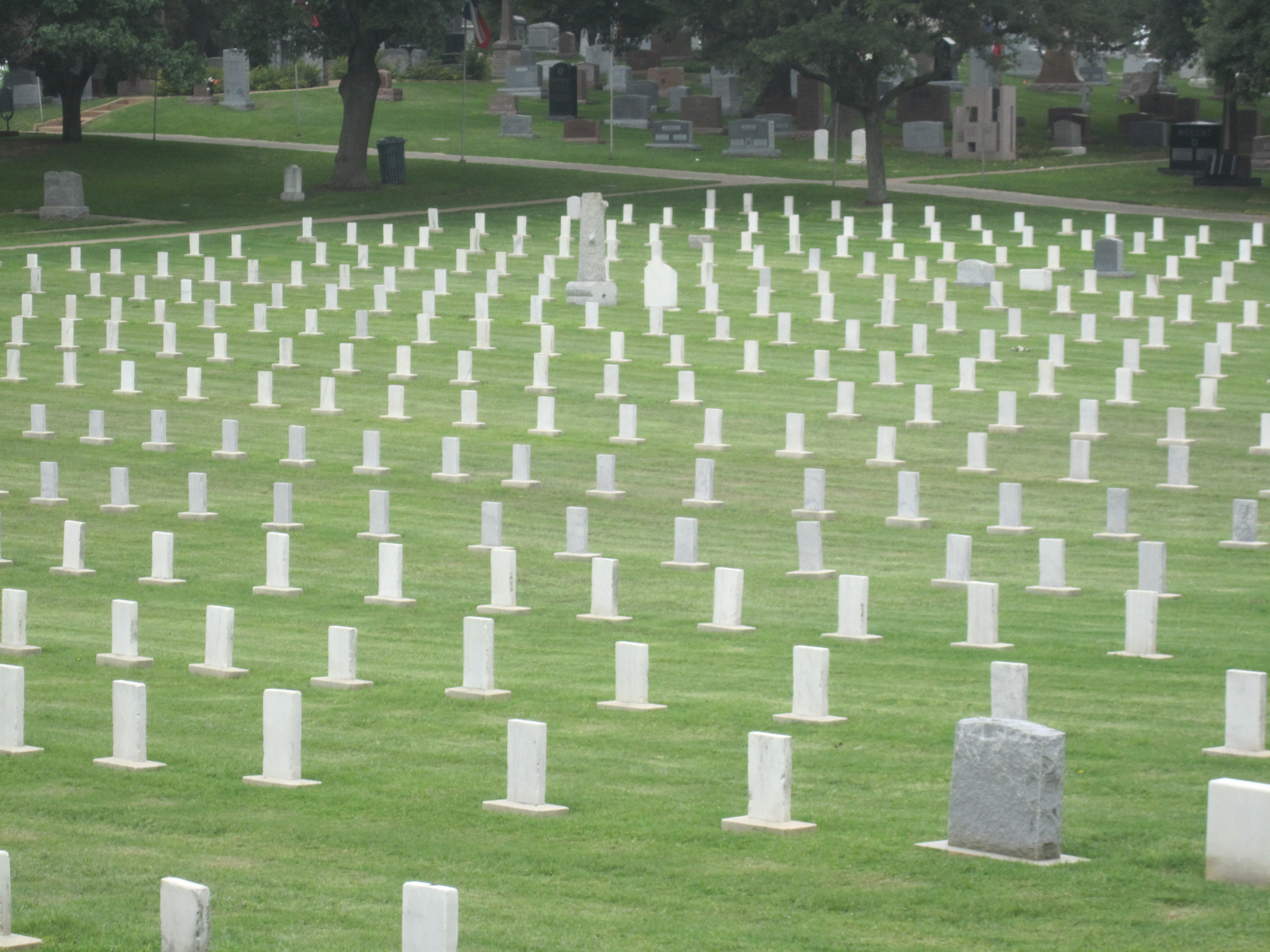
Confederate graves

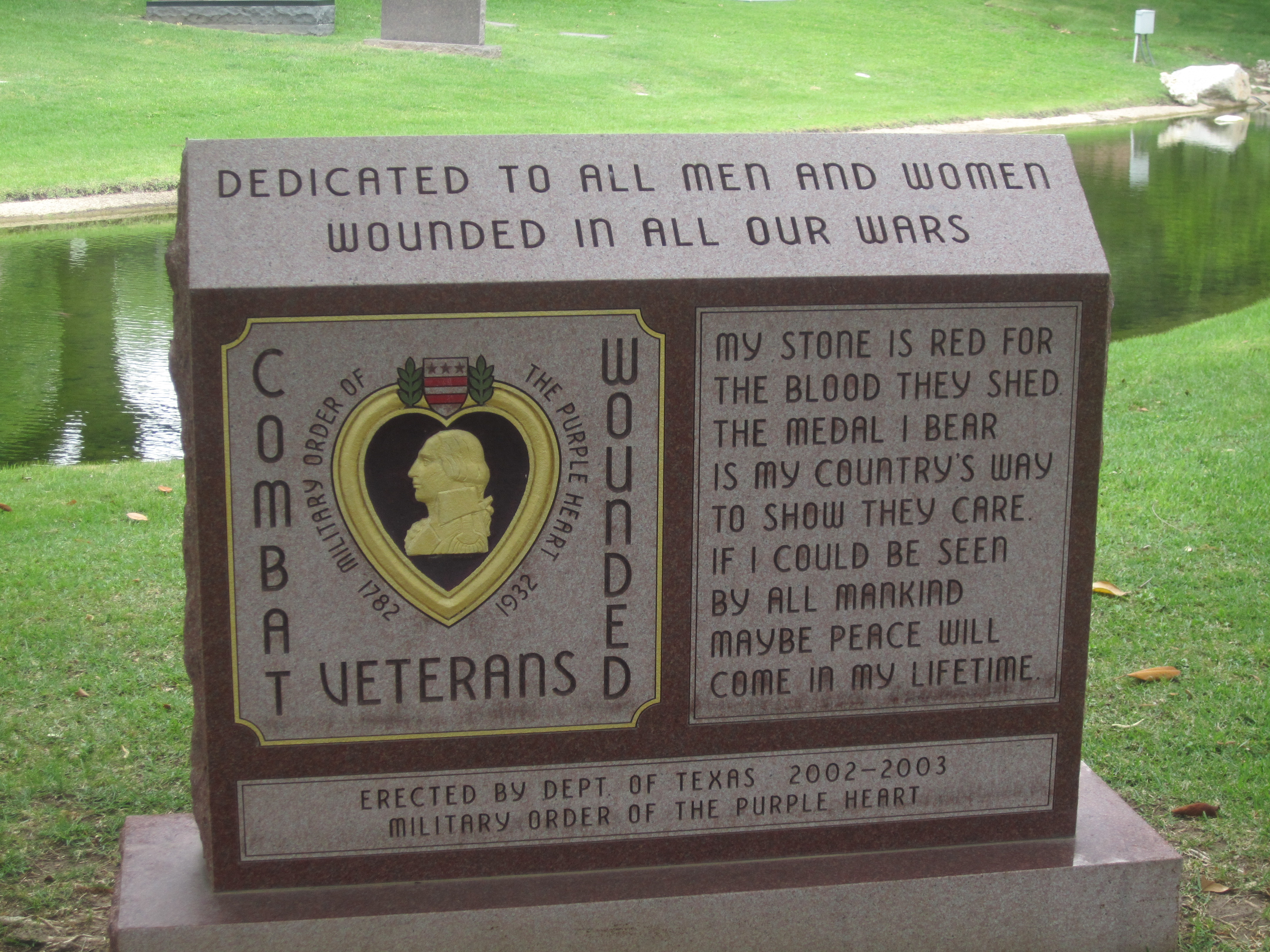
Monument to the wounded of America's wars

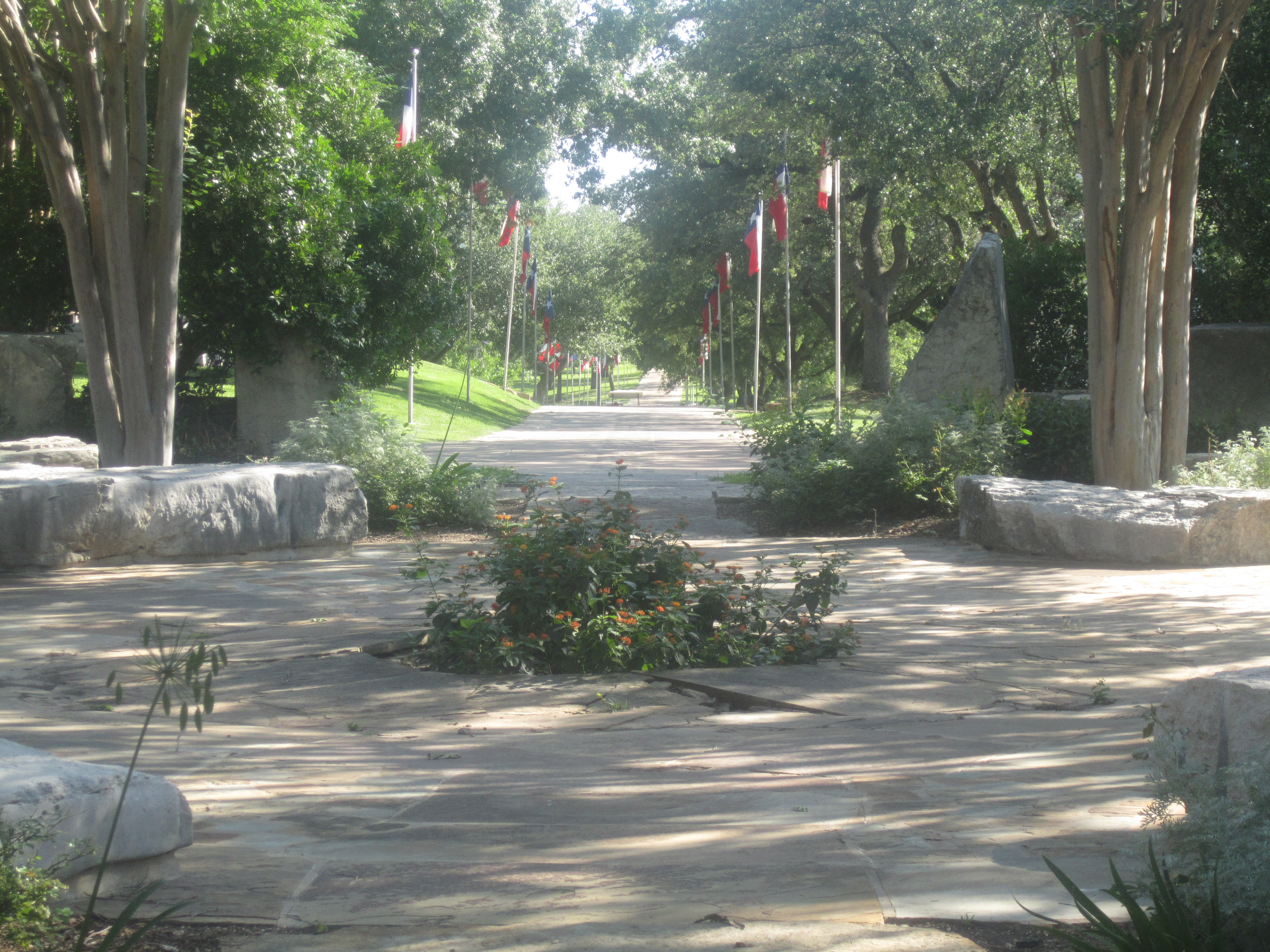
Meditation area

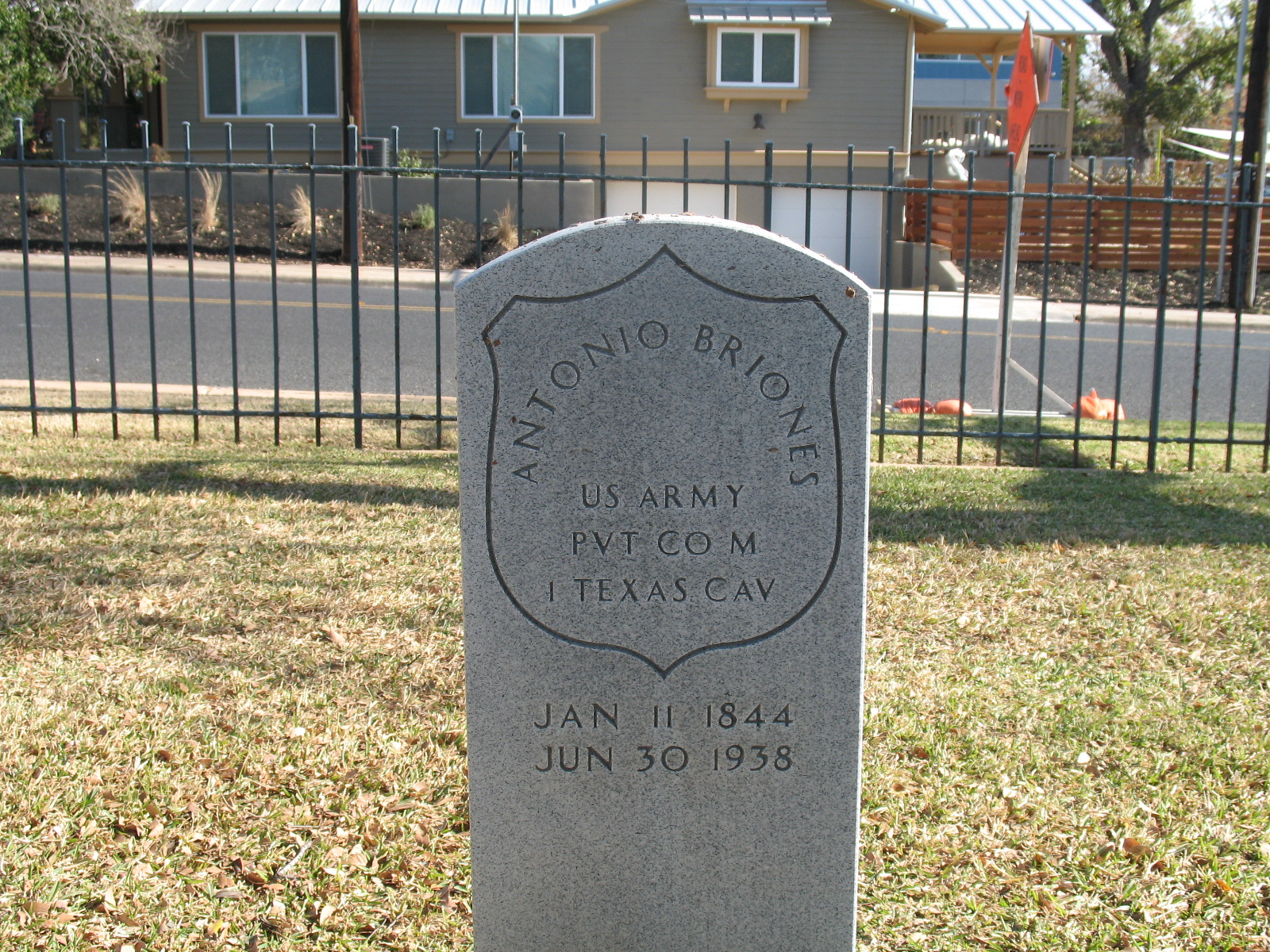
Antonio Briones Headstone in the Texas State Cemetery

After the death of Edward Burleson in 1851, the Texas Legislature arranged for his burial on land formerly belonging to Andrew Jackson Hamilton. In 1854, the Legislature established a monument at Burleson's grave-site for $1,000 and purchased the surrounding land. The burial ground was virtually ignored until the Civil War, when Texas Confederate officers killed in battle were buried there. In 1864 and 1866 more land was purchased for veterans' burials. An area of 1-acre (4,000 m^{2}) was also set aside for graves of Union veterans (all but one later removed, to Fort Sam Houston National Cemetery in San Antonio). The remaining Union soldier is Antonio Briones, who was left at the request of his family. He is interred alone in the far northeast corner of the cemetery.

Because the Texas Confederate Men's Home and the Confederate Women's Home were located in Austin, more than two thousand Confederate veterans and widows are interred at the State Cemetery. Most were buried after 1889. The last Confederate veterans in the Cemetery were reinterred in 1944; the last widow, in 1963.

In 1932, the State Cemetery was little known and had no roads. There was a dirt road running through the grounds of the Cemetery linked to what was then called Onion Creek Highway. The road kept its highway status when Texas historian Louis Kemp brought it to the attention of the Texas Highway Department that the road running through the Cemetery should be paved. The roads, which are officially designated as State Highway 165, are dedicated to Kemp, and were for a time known as "Lou Kemp Highway". Kemp was also the driving force behind the reinterment of many early Texas figures in time for the Texas Centennial in 1936.

The cemetery was added to the National Register of Historic Places in 1986, but by the early 1990s, the State Cemetery had fallen into disrepair—suffering from vandalism and decay—and was unsafe to visit. In 1994, after noting the condition of the Cemetery, Lieutenant Governor Bob Bullock initiated a three-year project that added a visitor center and renovated the cemetery. In 1997, there was a re-dedication and a reopening of the State Cemetery.

A three-person Texas State Cemetery committee oversees operations at the cemetery. Thomas N. "Tom" Sellers (appointed by Governor Greg Abbott) is chairman. James L. Bayless (Speaker's appointment) and Carolyn Hodges (appointee of the lieutenant governor) also serve. Nathan Stephens is the Administrator and the senior historian is Will Erwin.

Former Governor and United States President George W. Bush announced his intention to be buried in the State Cemetery. However, in August 2018, Bush decided he and his wife will be buried at his presidential center following their deaths.

== Monuments and memorials ==
Notable monuments and memorials within the cemetery include:

- Black Legislators Monument
- Gold Star Mothers Memorial
- Medal of Honor Monument
- Nine Men of Praha Monument
- Purple Heart Monument
- September 11, 2001 Monument
- Texas Armed Forces Memorial Flagpole
- Victory in Europe and Victory in Japan Day Monument
- Vietnam Memorial

== Notable interments ==
- Betty Andujar, state legislator
- Bob Armstrong, Land Commissioner of Texas
- Stephen F. Austin, impresario
- Moseley Baker, journalist, soldier
- Don Baylor, baseball player
- Cedric Benson, football player
- George Beto, director of the Texas Department of Corrections
- Anita Lee Blair, state legislator
- Andrew Briscoe, veteran of the Texas Revolution
- Guy M. Bryan, U.S. Congressman from Texas and Confederate veteran
- Benjamin F. Bryant, veteran of the Texas Revolution
- Augustus Buchel, German born U.S. veteran and Confederate veteran
- Bob Bullock, Lieutenant Governor of Texas
- Edward Burleson, Vice President of the Republic of Texas
- Greg Coleman, Solicitor General of Texas
- Waggoner Carr, Texas Attorney General
- Gene Cernan, astronaut
- George Christian, journalist
- Wayne Connally, state legislator (cremated, with cenotaph)
- Barbara Smith Conrad, opera singer
- James Cotton, blues musician
- Trammel Crow, real estate developer
- Walter Cunningham, astronaut
- Susanna Dickinson, survivor of the Battle of the Alamo
- J. Frank Dobie, writer
- John Holt Duncan, jurist
- Joe Bertram Frantz, historian
- Fred Gipson, author
- Lena Guerrero, Texas Railroad Commissioner
- Dorsey B. Hardeman, state legislator
- William Polk Hardeman, Texian veteran, U.S. veteran, and Confederate veteran. Confederate General.
- Warren G. Harding, Texas State Treasurer
- John Hemphill, Chief Justice of Texas
- Jack Hightower, U.S. Representative
- Paul John Hilbert, state legislator
- Andrew Jackson Houston, U.S. Senator
- John Hughes, Texas Ranger
- Patrick C. Jack, member of the Texas Congress
- Barbara Jordan, U.S. Representative
- Albert Sidney Johnston, Texian veteran, U.S. veteran, and Confederate veteran. General in all 3 armies.
- Delwin Jones, state legislator
- William Wayne Justice, federal judge
- Herb Kelleher, founder of Southwest Airlines
- Larry L. King, journalist
- Dan Kubiak, educator and businessman
- Edmund Kuempel, state legislator
- Chris Kyle, US Navy SEAL
- Tom Landry, football coach and player (cenotaph)
- Thomas C. Lea III, artist and writer
- Frank L. Madla, state legislator
- Benjamin McCulloch, U.S veteran and Confederate veteran. Confederate General.
- Spanky McFarland, actor
- Crawford Martin, Texas Attorney General
- Jim Mattox, Texas Attorney General
- James A. Michener, writer (cenotaph)
- Richard Moya, Travis County Commissioner
- José Antonio Navarro, veteran of the Texas Revolution
- James E. Nugent, Texas Railroad Commissioner
- Richard Arvin Overton, World War II veteran
- Bill Patman, U.S. Representative
- Hally Ballinger Bryan Perry, co-founder of the Daughters of the Republic of Texas
- J. J. Pickle, U.S. Representative
- William C. Powers Jr., president of the University of Texas
- Cactus Pryor, broadcaster
- Irma Lerma Rangel, state legislator
- Daniel Webster Roberts, Texas Ranger
- Sterling C. Robertson, settler
- Darrell Royal, football coach and player
- Jerry Sadler, Texas Land Commissioner
- William Read Scurry, Representative in the Republic of Texas House of Representatives, U.S. veteran and Confederate veteran. CSA General.
- Bud Shrake, writer
- Lamartine Pemberton Sieker, Texas Ranger
- Pete Snelson, state legislator
- James Austin Sylvester, veteran of the Texas Revolution
- Alexander W. Terrell, state legislator
- Ernest O. Thompson, Texas Railroad Commissioner
- May Peterson Thompson, opera singer
- Homer Thornberry, federal judge and U.S. Representative
- John G. Tower, U.S. Senator (cenotaph)
- Joanna Troutman, seamstress of original Texas flag
- Byron M. Tunnell, Texas Railroad Commissioner
- William A. A. "Bigfoot" Wallace, Texas Ranger
- Thomas W. Ward, builder-architect, soldier, Mayor of Austin
- Walter Prescott Webb, historian
- Willie Wells, baseball player
- John A. Wharton, Confederate veteran, plantation owner
- Robert McAlpin Williamson, judge
- James Charles Wilson, member of the Texas Congress
- Will Wilson, Texas Attorney General
- Charlie Wilson, U.S. Representative (Cenotaph)
- Ralph Yarborough, U.S. Senator

=== Governors and First Lady of Texas ===
- Peter Hansborough Bell
- John Connally and Nellie Connally
- Edmund J. Davis
- Miriam "Ma" Ferguson
- James "Pa" Ferguson
- James Pinckney Henderson
- John Ireland
- Francis Lubbock
- Dan Moody
- Ann Richards
- Hardin Richard Runnels
- Allan Shivers
- Preston Smith
- Mark White

=== Other ===
- 1 Navy SEAL
- 5 Lieutenant Governors of Texas
- 5 Speakers of the Texas House of Representatives
- 15 Signers of the Texas Declaration of Independence
- 3 U.S. Senators
- 6 U.S. Representatives
- 5 First Ladies of Texas (including planned burial plots for Anita Thigpen Perry who are still alive)
- 5 authors
- 11 Republic of Texas veterans
- 9 Confederate Generals
- 3 Medal of Honor recipients
- 2 American Revolutionary War veterans
- 1 17th-century French sailor (remains discovered in the wreck of La Salle's ship La Belle in 1995)
- First Texas Solicitor General
- 1 member of the Baseball Hall of Fame
- 2 astronauts
- 1 president of the University of Texas at Austin
- 1 football player
- 1 notable supercenterian

== Popular culture ==
- In one episode of King of the Hill, Cotton Hill is awarded a plot in the Texas State Cemetery for his heroism during World War II. However, Cotton is never buried in this plot when he dies in another episode, but is instead cremated. Actor Barry Jenner, who appeared in 27 episodes of the 1980s television series Dallas, is also awarded a plot.

== Gallery ==
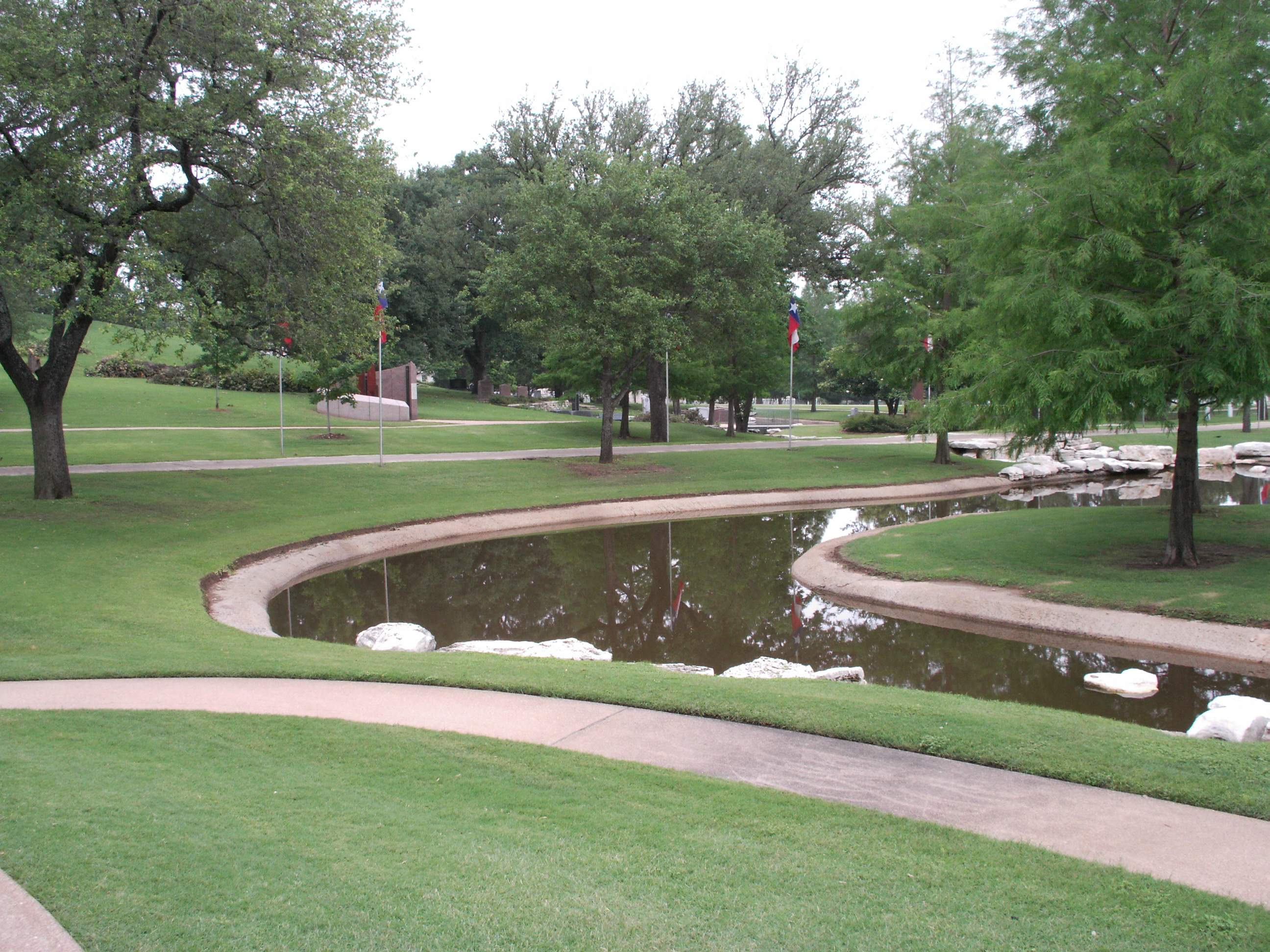
Crescent Pond

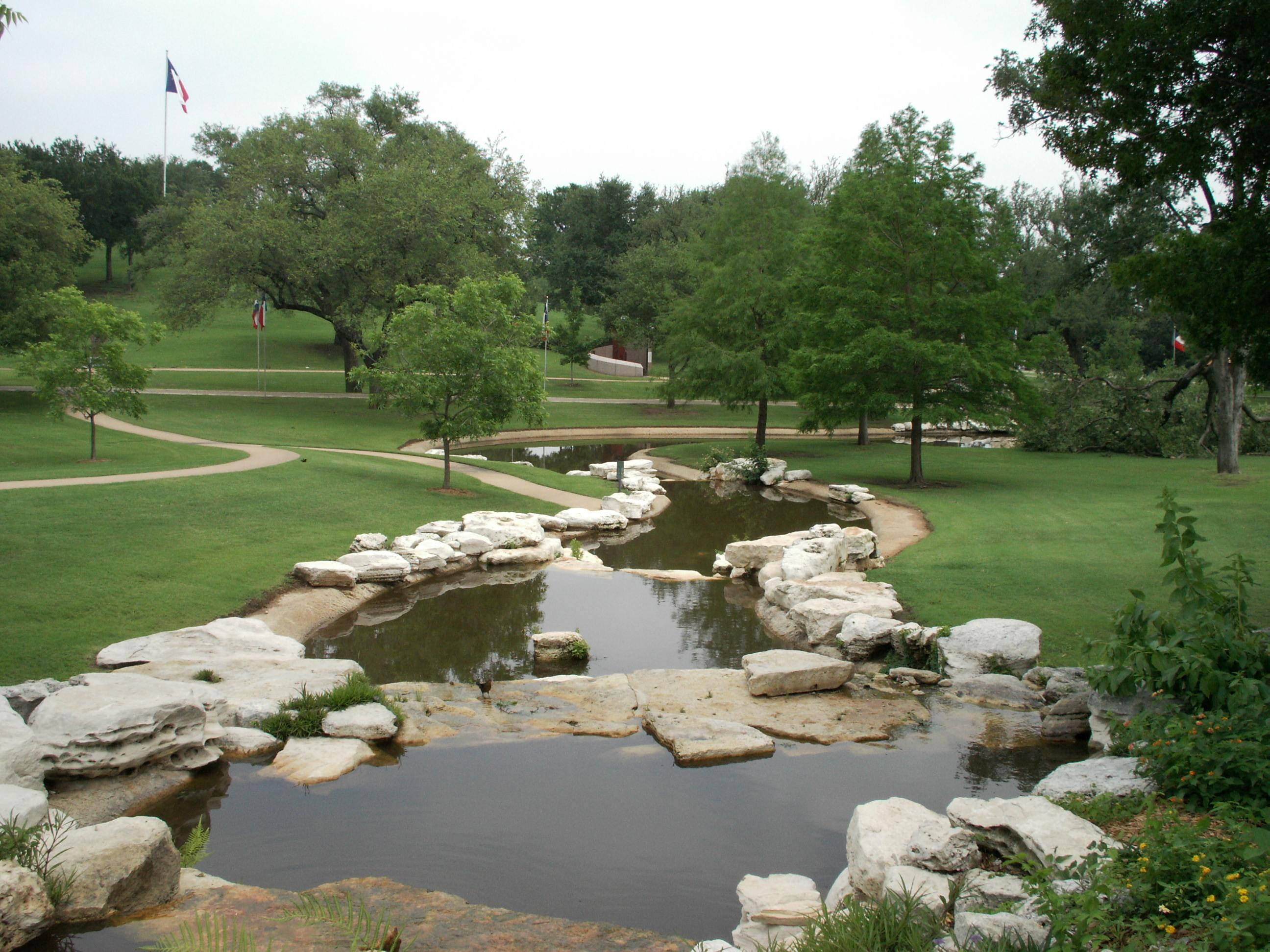
Opposite end of the pond

September 11, 2001, memorial

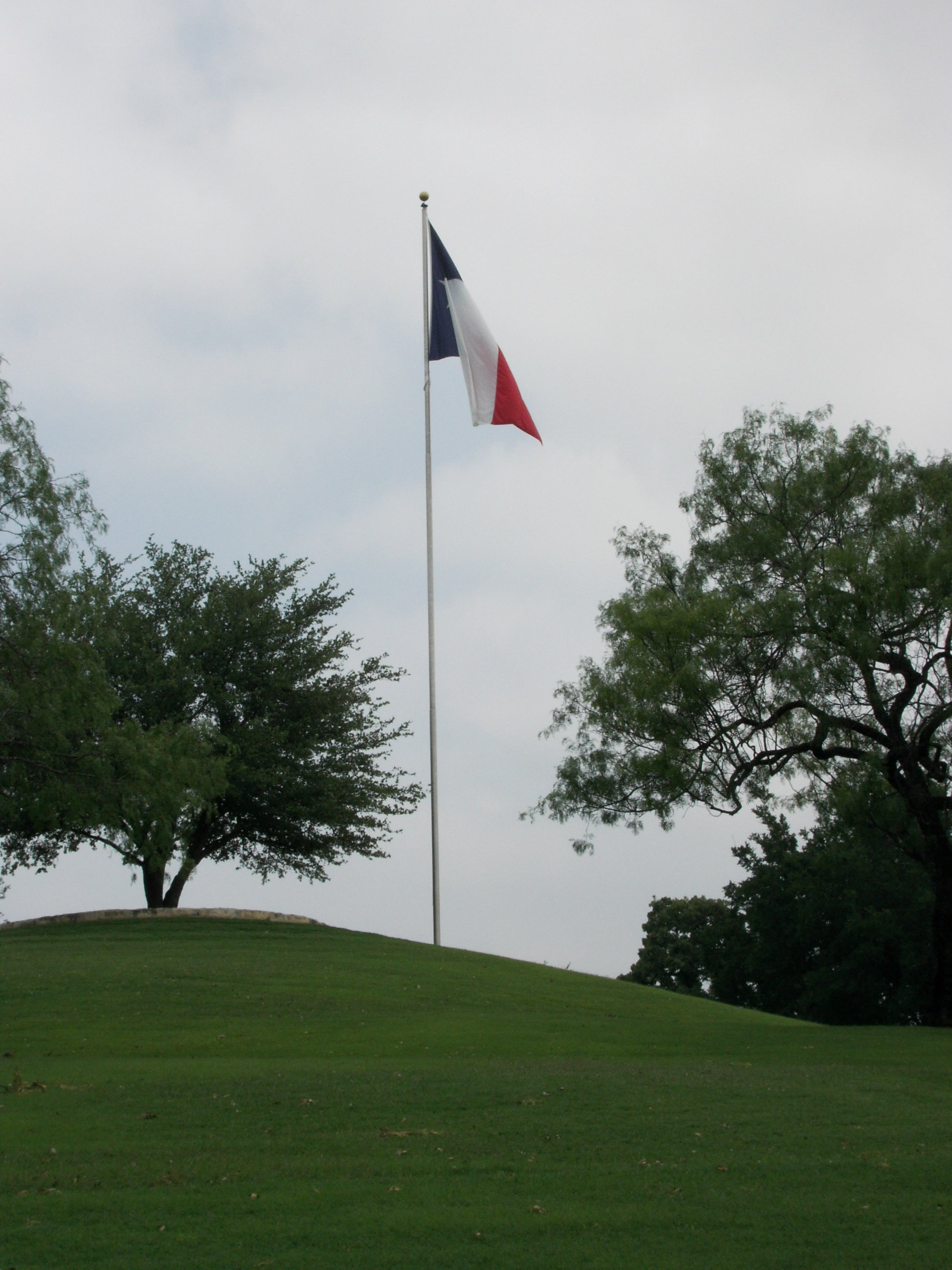
Main flagpole, on the hilltop

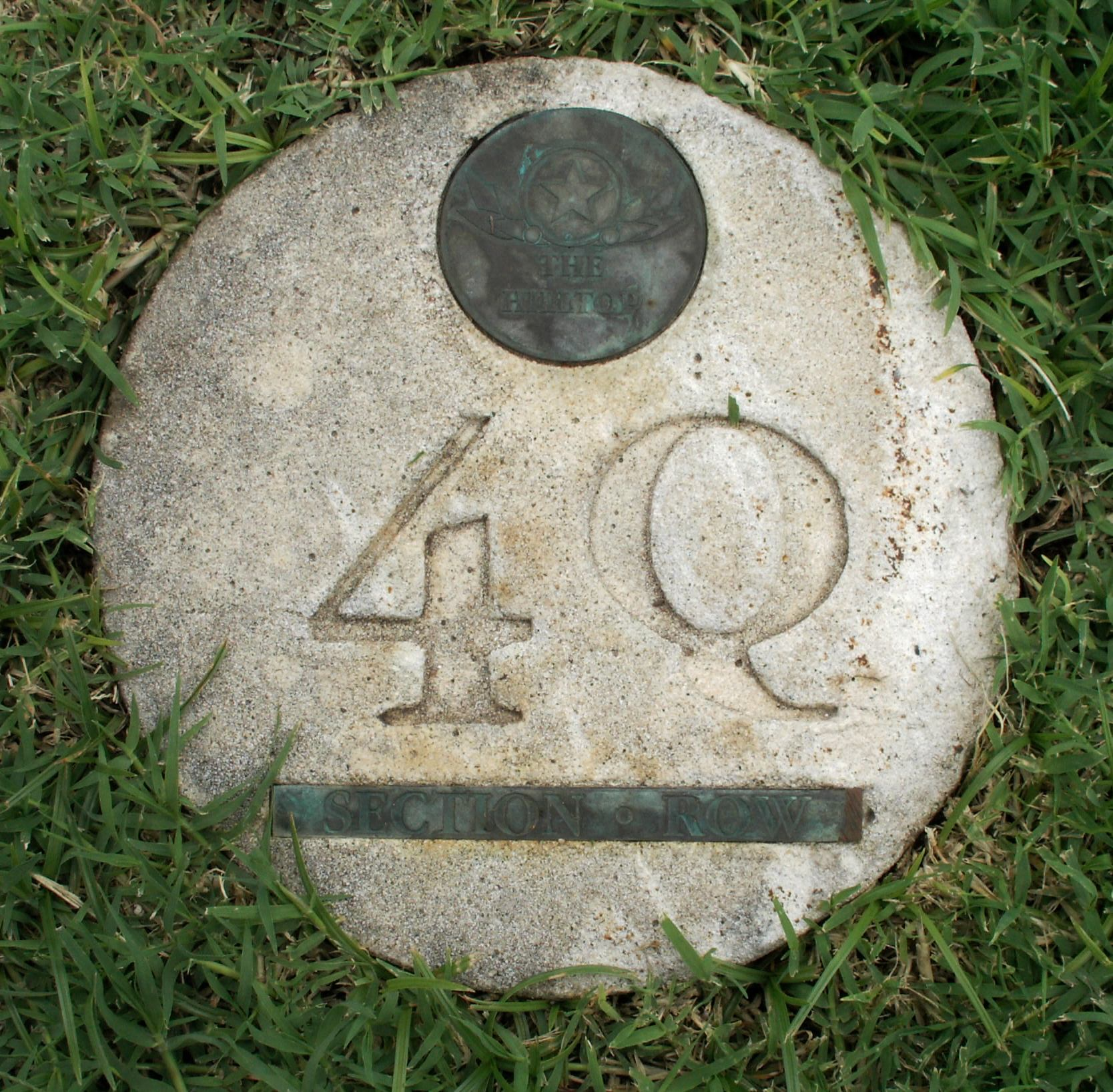
A section marker

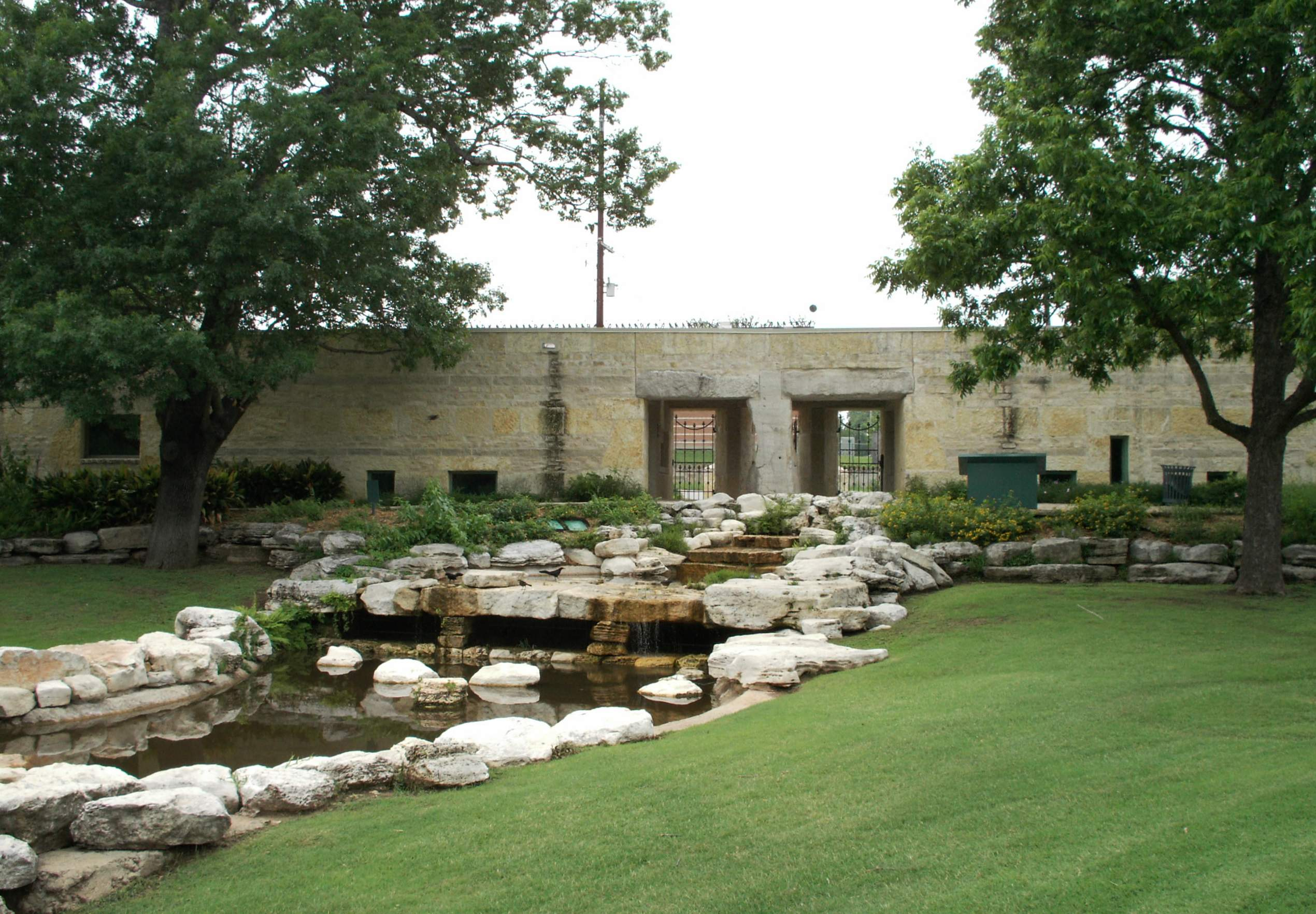
Visitor center

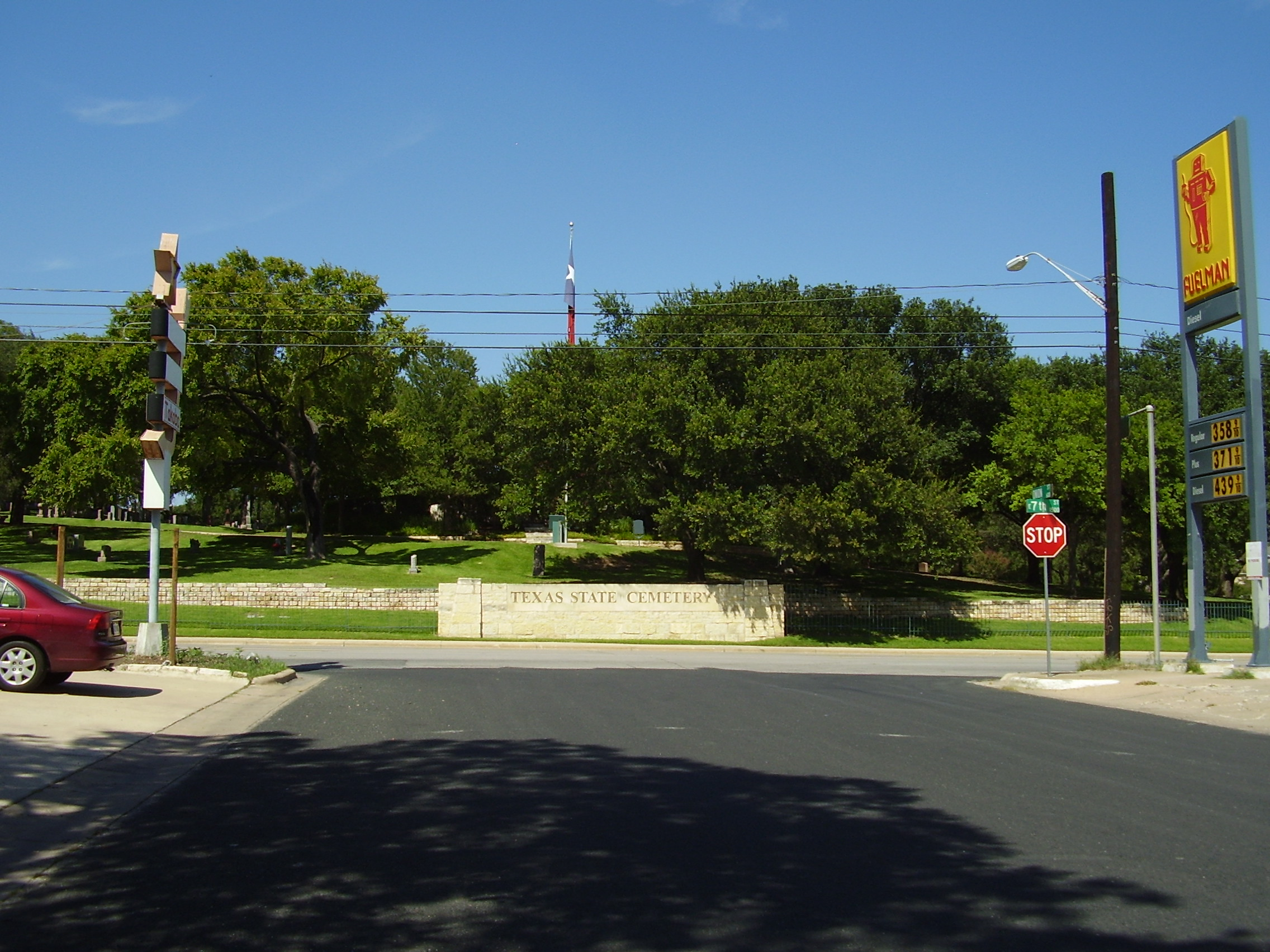
Texas State Cemetery as seen from East 7th Street

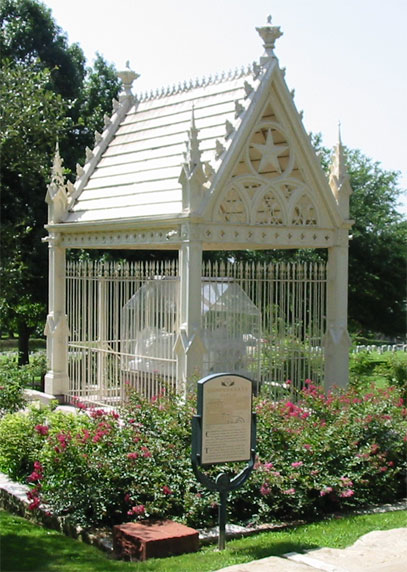
Tomb of Albert Sidney Johnston

== See also ==
- List of cemeteries in Texas
- Statue of Albert Sidney Johnston (Texas State Cemetery)
