= Jon Yarbrough =

American businessperson (born 1956/1957)

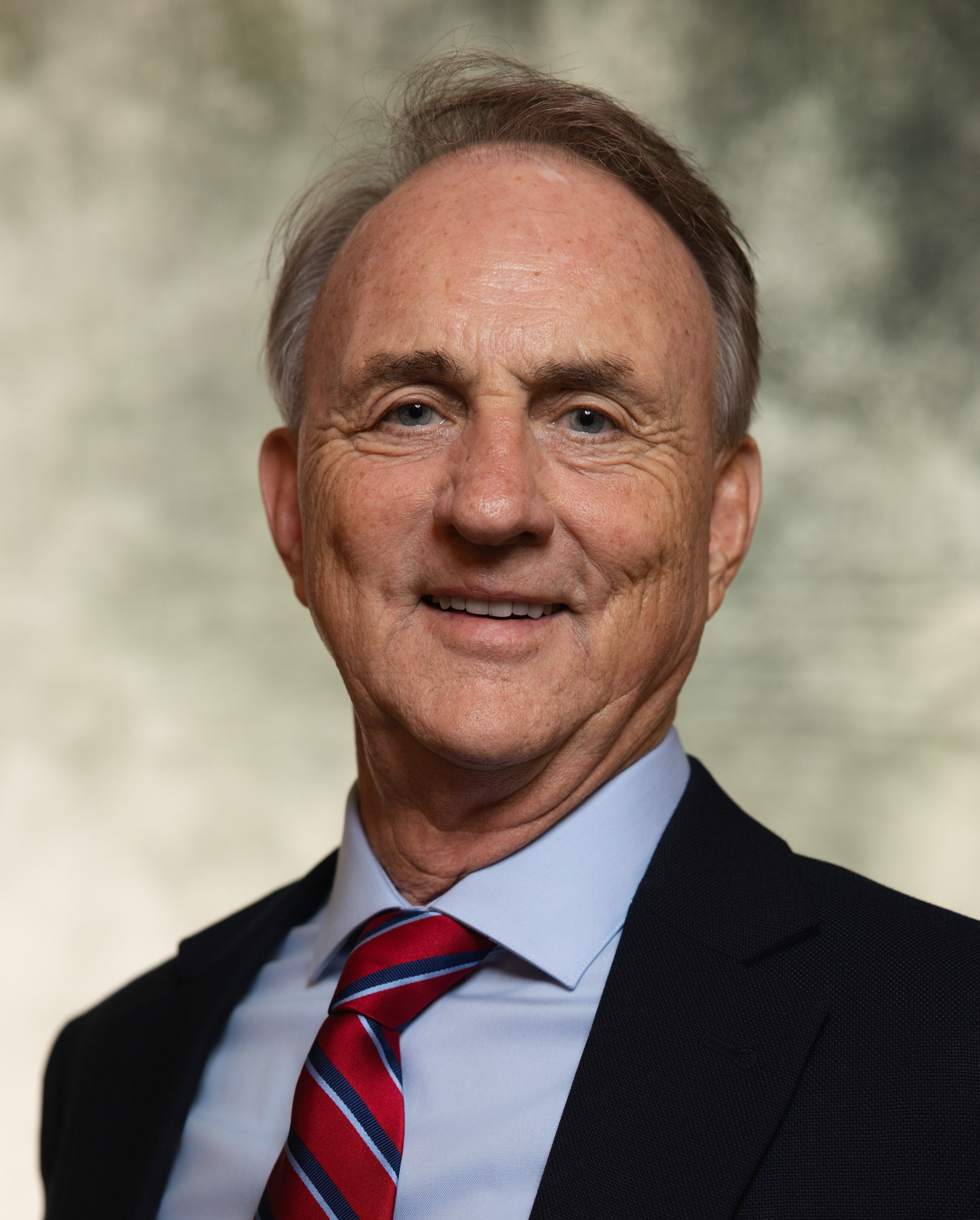
- Born: 1956 or 1957 (age 68–69)
- Education: Tennessee Technological University
- Known for: Founder, Video Gaming Technologies
- Spouse: Kathy Lee Campbell
- Children: 2

Jon Yarbrough (born May 10, 1957) is an American billionaire businessman. He is the founder of Video Gaming Technologies (VGT), a company focused in the Class II gambling machine market for tribal casinos. He sold the company in 2014 for US$1.28 billion.

== Early life and education ==
Jon Yarbrough was born on May 10, 1957. He earned a bachelor's degree in industrial engineering from Tennessee Technological University in 1981. During college, he interned at NASA, where he designed a mini supersonic wind tunnel and contributed to instructions sent to the Mars lander.

His first business venture was as a door-to-door salesman for Southwestern Advantage. An avid foosball player, he purchased a foosball table while in college. Unable to store it at his home, he made a deal with a bar in Cookeville, Tennessee, to leave the table there in exchange for half of the proceeds from the games played on it. The venture proved so profitable that he used the income to pay his college expenses.

== Career ==
After a brief period as a distributor of arcade games, Yarbrough founded Video Gaming Technologies (VGT) in 1991. In the company's early days, Yarbrough and his team developed new gaming machines in his garage. The company focused on the niche market of Class II gaming machines, which are commonly used by tribal casinos. He later stated that he had worked with around 35 tribes across more than 100 locations

By 2013, VGT had over 20,200 machines on lease across the country and reported annual revenues of $235 million, with an EBITDA of $157 million. In October 2014, Yarbrough sold the company to the Australian gaming giant Aristocrat Leisure for approximately $1.28 billion.

As of March 2026, Forbes estimated his net worth at $5.4 billion. In 2020, he ranked No. 327 on the Forbes 400 list of America's richest people.

== Investment philosophy and activities ==
Yarbrough established Yarbrough Capital, a family office based in Franklin, Tennessee, to manage his investments. As of September 2025, Yarbrough Capital had $5.4 billion in total holdings, with major positions in technology stocks such as NVIDIA, Apple, and Alphabet.

In 1986, he invested in Microsoft's IPO.

== Personal life ==
Yarbrough is married to Kathy Lee Campbell Yarbrough and has two children. He resides in Franklin, Tennessee.
