= Warren G. Harding (Texas politician) =

American politician (1921–2005)

Texas State Treasurer
- In office October 5, 1977 – January 18, 1983
- Governor: Dolph Briscoe; Bill Clements
- Preceded by: Jesse James
- Succeeded by: Ann Richards

Personal details
- Born: Warren Glenn Harding; January 8, 1921 Princeton, Texas, US
- Died: April 2, 2005 (aged 84) Dallas, Texas, US
- Resting place: Texas State Cemetery; Austin, Texas
- Party: Democratic
- Spouse: LaVelle
- Children: 3
- Parent(s): William Moore; Ethel Baccus

Warren Glenn Harding Sr. (January 8, 1921 – April 2, 2005) was an American politician from the state of Texas, a member of the Democratic Party who served as Texas State Treasurer from 1977 to 1983. He was preceded in office by Jesse James and succeeded by Ann Richards.

Harding won election as county treasurer for Dallas County, Texas in 1950, and served in the role through 1977. Governor Dolph Briscoe appointed him as state treasurer in 1977 after James died in office. He was elected to a full term in 1978, but ended his 1982 re-election campaign against Richards when he accepted a plea agreement after being charged with misusing his office. He ran in a special election for the United States House of Representatives in 1985 but lost.

== Early life ==
Harding was born on January 8, 1921, to Ethel (née Baccus) and William Moore Harding, on a farm in Princeton, Texas. The Harding family is not related to Warren G. Harding, who was President-elect of the United States when he was born.

The Harding family moved to Dallas when he was young, and he graduated from schools in the Dallas Independent School District. Harding attended North Texas State University and Southern Methodist University. He earned a bachelor's degree in government. During World War II, Harding served in the United States Navy. After the war, he became a deputy district clerk for Dallas County, Texas.

== Political career ==
As a member of the Democratic Party, Harding ran in an election for county treasurer of Dallas County in 1950, in part due to his famous name. He won a four-year term. In 1956, he ran for election to be the Texas State Treasurer against incumbent Jesse James in the Democratic Party primary election; James defeated Harding, receiving 518,102 votes while Harding received 367,067 in the unofficial vote count. In 1964, Harding was elected president of the National Association of County Treasurers and Finance Officers, which represented over 3,000 counties in the United States. The National Association of County Treasurers and Finance Officers named him an outstanding treasurer and he won the first Outstanding Treasurer Award from the County Treasurer's Association of Texas, of which he also served as president.

Harding continued to serve as county treasurer until October 5, 1977, when Governor Dolph Briscoe appointed Harding to the position of State Treasurer after James' death. In 1978, Harding was elected to a full four-year term.

=== Charges ===
In 1982, Ronnie Earle, the district attorney for Travis County, Texas, investigated Harding for misusing his office. Harding was indicted on two third-degree felony charges of official misconduct for allegedly having two state employees work on his reelection campaign during time they were supposed to be working for the state.

The indictments came mere days before the election filing deadline, and three challengers entered the race. Harding continued his campaign in the Democratic primary and finished second in the first round of balloting, advancing to a runoff election against Ann Richards. After initially entering an innocent plea, but before the runoff election, Harding pled guilty to a misdemeanor offense in return for prosecutors dismissing the felony charges and Harding withdrew his candidacy. Richards was elected to office in 1982. Harding paid a $2,000 fine and reimbursed the state $2,000.

District Attorney Earle also alleged that Harding had used his position to benefit his son, Warren Jr., who sold bonds for the brokerage firm Rauscher Pierce Refsnes. No charges were filed on that allegation.

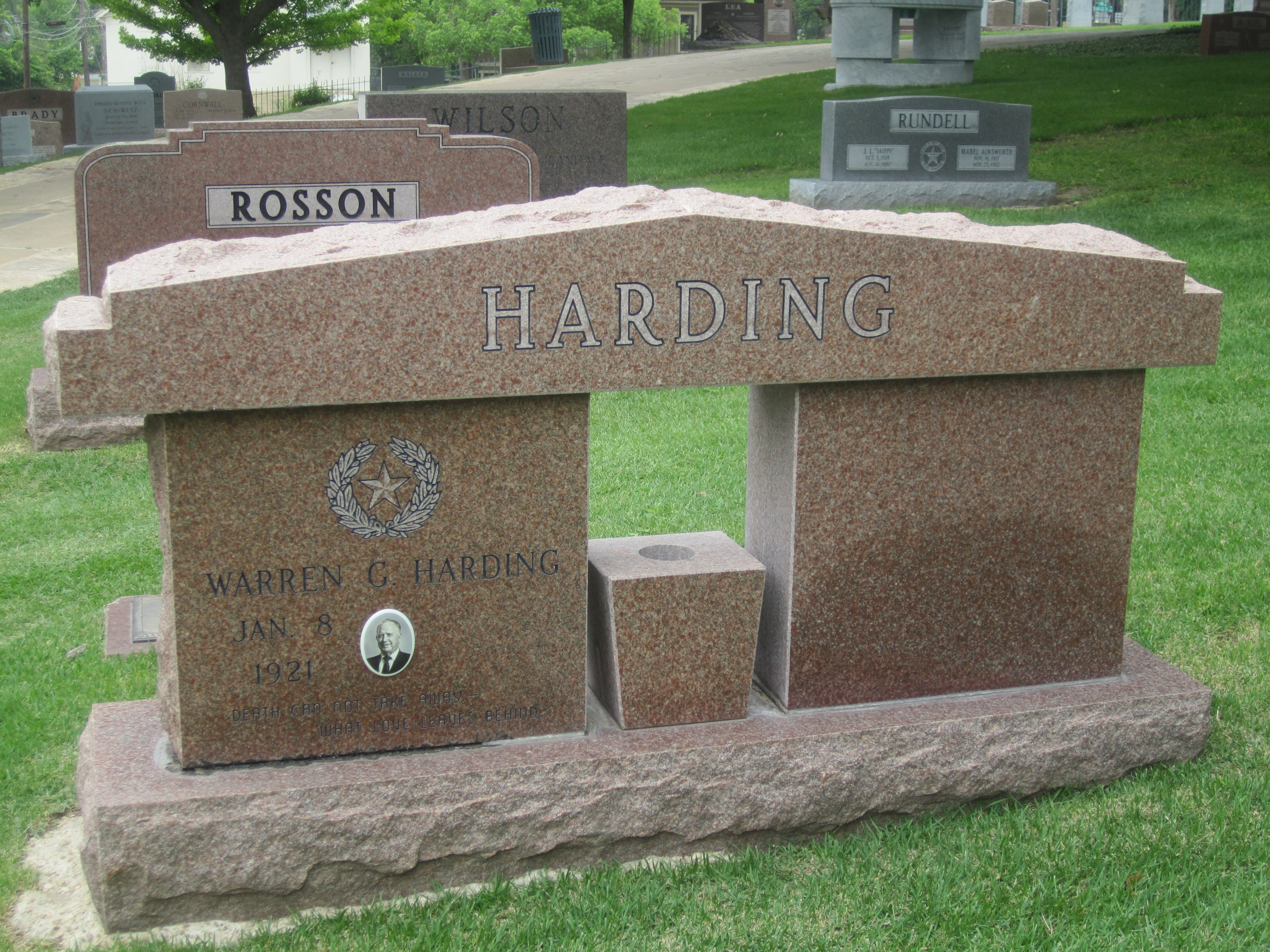
Harding's monument at Texas State Cemetery

In 1985, Sam B. Hall Jr., who served in the United States House of Representatives representing Texas's 1st congressional district, resigned when he was appointed to the United States District Court for the Eastern District of Texas. Harding ran in a special election to serve the remainder of Hall's term. In the first round of the election, held on June 29, Harding finished in seventh place out of eight candidates, with Edd Hargett and Jim Chapman finishing in first and second place, respectively, and advancing to a runoff election.

== Personal life ==
Harding and his wife, LaVelle, had three children. They resided on a ranch in Brownsboro, Texas. Their son, Warren Jr., ran for Texas Comptroller of Public Accounts and won the Republican Party nomination in the 1990 elections. Harding was in freemasonry, as a member of the Scottish Rite.

Harding died April 2, 2005, in Dallas, Texas, and is interred at the Texas State Cemetery in Austin.

Party political offices
Preceded by Jesse James	Democratic nominee for Texas State Treasurer; 1978	Succeeded by Ann Richards
Political offices
Preceded by Jesse James	Texas State Treasurer; 1977–1983	Succeeded by Ann Richards
