= Don Yarbrough =

American judge

Donald Burt Yarbrough (born August 5, 1941, in Dallas, Texas) served as a justice of the Texas Supreme Court until being forced to resign on charges of crimes for which he later spent six years in prison.

Yarbrough ran for the Texas Supreme Court in 1976 claiming that God wanted him to run for that office. Yarbrough defeated a well-respected judge, Charles Barrow, in the Democratic Party primary, mainly because most voters confused him with either Don Yarborough (who had run for Governor before) or Senator Ralph Yarborough.

Yarbrough's election to the Supreme Court was in spite of various scandals, such as being indicted for forging an auto registration and lying to a grand jury. Yarbrough resigned from the Texas Supreme Court in July 1977. He was convicted of lying to the grand jury in January 1978 and he fled with his family to Grenada in 1981.

Grenada refused to extradite Yarbrough and he attended St. George's University School of Medicine (SGUSOM). However, while attending classes at SGUSOM's campus in St. Vincent and the Grenadines in 1983, he was arrested by U.S. consular officials. Yarbrough was sentenced to six years in federal prison in 1986 for bribery. Yarbrough, Federal Bureau of Prisons #36007-079, was released on March 8, 1990. He died on August 12, 2017, in Orlando, Florida.

== Sources ==
- Justices of Texas 1836-1986 - Donald Burt Yarbrough
