= Lamartine Pemberton Sieker =

American lawman (1848–1914)

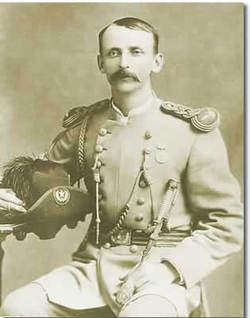

Lamartine Pemberton Sieker (April 8, 1848 – November 13, 1914) was an American lawman and a Texas Ranger. His three brothers, including Edward Armon Sieker, were also Texas Rangers.

== Sources ==
- Parsons, Chuck (April 30, 2009). "The Sieker Brothers: A Quartet of Texas Rangers" (PDF). Texas Ranger Dispatch: 1–8.
- Roth, Michael P. (2001). "Sieker, Lamartine Pemberton". Historical Dictionary of Law Enforcement. Westport, CT: Greenwood Press. p. 323. ISBN 9780313305603.
- Weiss, Harold J. Jr. (April 7, 2018). "Sieker, Lamartine Pemberton (1848–1914)". Handbook of Texas Online. Texas State Historical Association.
