= Operation Seek and Keep =

Operation Seek and Keep was a year-long United States Immigration and Naturalization Service (now the Department of Homeland Security) covert investigation that in 1998 resulted in the breaking of an international alien smuggling and money-laundering ring that brought in an estimated 12,000 illegal aliens from India and elsewhere to the United States.

It was the first-ever INS-led wire tap case resulting in a successful criminal prosecution, and the first time that federal prosecutors used money-laundering and racketeering statutes to smash an alien smuggling operation and seize its assets. Then-U.S. Attorney General Janet Reno called it "the largest alien smuggling organization ever dismantled in United States history."

== Tracking the Smuggling Ring ==
Officials said the smuggling operation, which was loosely made up of three different cartels, smuggled mostly Indian nationals from India to Moscow, where connecting flights allowed aliens to travel to Cuba. The organization also smuggled aliens who were nationals of Afghanistan, Pakistan, and Syria. From Cuba aliens would then either fly or travel by boat to the Miami area or travel across the Mexican border into Texas.

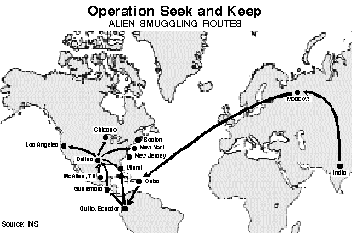
U.S. Immigration and Naturalization Service map of alien smuggling routes broken by Operation "Seek and Keep" in 1998. The cartel moved aliens from India through Moscow and on to Cuba, from where the aliens were transported by sea or traveled by land into the U.S.

Once in the U.S., the immigrants were kept in stash houses where they were kept under lock and key, until their families or prospective employers paid their smuggling fee. The alien smuggling fees were primarily paid to a U.S.-based hawaladar who then contacted hawaladars in India, who then made the necessary arrangements with alien smugglers there. The smuggling cartel transported aliens at a cost of $20,000 per alien, generating more than $200 million in proceeds over a 3-year period.

According to INS officials, INS agents based in Texas first became aware of the operation in 1995, when they discovered a commercial pilot in Texas was making frequent flights from Dallas to the Texas/Mexico border, and became aware that an Indian smuggling ring was working into Texas through Mexico and Central America. In 1997, after a former smuggler contacted an INS agent in Ciudad Juarez, Mexico, and became an informant, authorities learned the operation was using multiple routes. After further investigation, the case became a formal operation within INS and the Department of Justice, and was pursued as a racketeering and money-laundering case. The operation was also allowed to begin using new wire-tapping authority given to it by Congress, which led to over 35,000 calls by the smuggling operation to be intercepted.

== Breaking the Cartel ==
In November 1998, twenty-one people were taken into custody in a series of raids in several states, the Bahamas, Puerto Rico and Ecuador. Two of the ringleaders were arrested, including Nick Diaz, also known as Nitin Shettie. Diaz was arrested in a raid in the Bahamas on November 14, 1998, and after his arrest by Bahamian authorities he was then taken into U.S. custody. The raid in the Bahamas detained dozens of Indian citizens waiting to make the last leg of the trip to the United States. An INS videotape showed Diaz being taken into custody, the Indian nationals who were being smuggled, and documents including piles of airline tickets used by the Indians to fly to the Caribbean via Moscow.

A federal grand jury in Dallas, where the investigation began, charged Shettie and 30 others in three sealed indictments that contained nearly 60 immigration and money-laundering counts. Eighteen alien smugglers accepted guilty pleas.

Then-INS Commissioner Doris Meissner hailed the success of the operation, saying, "Cracking a multimillion-dollar alien smuggling ring whose operations spanned four continents is an impressive achievement that underscores INS' commitment to defending the integrity of this nation's immigration laws ... we have disrupted and dismantled a major criminal enterprise."

== Groundbreaking Operation ==
Operation Seek and Keep was the first investigation authorized to use wiretapping technology in an illegal immigrant smuggling case, as approved by the Illegal Immigration Reform and Immigrant Responsibility Act of 1996, The INS used the new authority to intercept electronic communications, monitoring 35,000-plus calls. Also, for the first time, federal prosecutors used money-laundering statutes to smash an alien smuggling operation and seize assets.
