= 1972 United States presidential election in Texas =

- November 7, 1972
- Turnout: 66.59% (of registered voters); 44.90% (of voting age population)

Nominee	Richard Nixon	George McGovern
Party	Republican	Democratic
Home state	California	South Dakota
Running mate	Spiro Agnew	Sargent Shriver
Electoral vote	26	0
Popular vote	2,298,896	1,154,291
Percentage	66.20%	33.24%

Nixon
50–60%
60–70%
70–80%
80–90%
McGovern
50–60%
60–70%
80–90%
President before election
Richard Nixon
Republican
Elected President
Richard Nixon
Republican

The 1972 United States presidential election in Texas was held on November 7, 1972, as part of the 1972 United States presidential election. Incumbent Republican President Richard Nixon overwhelmingly won the state of Texas with 66.20% of the vote, to the Democratic Party candidate George McGovern's 33.24%, thus giving him the state's 26 electoral votes. This result made Texas 9.8% more Republican than the nation-at-large. This was the first time a Republican won the state of Texas since Texas-born Dwight D. Eisenhower won it in 1956, even as Democrat Dolph Briscoe won the gubernatorial election on the same Ballot.

Nixon's win in Texas made him the first ever Republican presidential candidate to break sixty percent of Texas' popular vote in a presidential election, surpassing former President Dwight D. Eisenhower's performance of 55.26% in 1956, and even native son Lyndon B. Johnson's 63.32% in 1964. Nixon is so far the only Republican candidate to break 65% or more of the state's popular vote. At the county level, 246 of Texas' 254 counties voted for Nixon, all by wide margins except for Robertson County, where Nixon won by a single vote. Nixon won 22 of Texas' 24 congressional districts – with the 18th (Harris County) and 20th (Bexar County) constituting the only congressional districts McGovern won anywhere in the former Confederacy. McGovern, however, did not win either county each of these districts were located in.

McGovern's only county wins came from the south Texas region along the U.S.-Mexico border and Cottle County in the northern part of the state, though even his performances here were underwhelming. In fact, this is the only election since 1952 in which Dimmit County and Presidio County voted for the Republican candidate. This is the first since the 1956 United States presidential election in which a Republican carried Travis County. This is also the last election in which Zavala County voted Republican, though that county did so even in 1960. Duval County, however, gave McGovern over 85 percent of the vote, which was the highest percentage of votes he received in any county nationally. 1972 was the third successive election when Duval proved the most Democratic county in the nation. He was the first Republican to ever carry La Salle, Hidalgo, Jim Wells, Willacy, Brooks, Cameron, Kenedy, and Nueces counties (all in South Texas), and the first since 1920 to carry Zavala County; and the first since 1928 to carry Dimmit, Frio, Kleberg, and San Patricio counties. He was the first Republican to carry many historically Democratic East Texas counties as well.

Nixon had previously narrowly lost Texas to John F. Kennedy in 1960 and had lost it narrowly again to Hubert Humphrey in 1968. However, as with the rest of the country in 1972, with the exception of Massachusetts and Washington, D.C., Texas voted for the Republican ticket of incumbent Nixon and Agnew.

As of the 2024 presidential election, this is the best Republican election performance in Texas, as well as the last time every single county in the Texas Triangle was won by the Republican candidate. Jefferson County would not vote Republican again until 2016, La Salle and Jim Wells counties until 2020, and Hidalgo and Willacy counties until 2024.

== Campaign ==
=== McGovern campaign ===
In the national race, McGovern was constantly portrayed throughout the election campaign as being a left-wing extremist because of his support for busing and civil rights, his opposition to the Vietnam War, support for granting amnesty to draft dodgers, and support for a thousand-dollar giveaway to each American as a solution to poverty. McGovern was also viewed as inconsistent following the replacement of his first running mate, Thomas Eagleton, while many Republican campaigners believed McGovern would legalize abortion and illicit drugs if he were elected – despite the fact that his ultimate running mate Sargent Shriver was firmly pro-life.

McGovern's Texas campaign was managed by Bill Clinton. Senator Lloyd Bentsen had originally been asked to manage the Texas campaign, but declined.

While those working on the campaign expected McGovern to lose in Texas, they aimed to decrease his margin of defeat. McGovern's campaign received little support from Democratic statewide officeholders. Additionally, Dolph Briscoe, the Democratic nominee in the coinciding 1972 Texas gubernatorial election refused to make any campaign appearances alongside McGovern. One of the few statewide office holders to support McGovern's campaign was Texas Land Commissioner Bob Armstrong. Lloyd Bentsen also endorsed McGovern.

Gonzo journalist Hunter S. Thompson would occasionally observe the Texas campaign operation. In addition to manager Bill Clinton, a future United States president, and his then-girlfriend (and future wife) Hillary, a future Democratic Party presidential nominee herself, there were a number of individuals who worked on McGovern's Texas campaign effort who would later achieve individual notability.

=== Role of the Clintons ===
Bill Clinton, and his then-girlfriend (and future wife) Hillary (both Yale Law School students at the time) had both moved to Austin to work on the Texas McGovern campaign. Bill had originally planned to begin working as a southern states coordinator for the McGovern campaign during the summer of 1971. However, he postponed those plans in order to spend that summer with Hillary, who had taken a summer job in California. The following summer, Bill took a job as the state manager of McGovern's campaign in Texas. He asked Hillary if she would be interested in joining him there. In her memoir Living History, Hillary recalled, "Bill asked if I wanted to go too. I did, but only if I had a specific job."

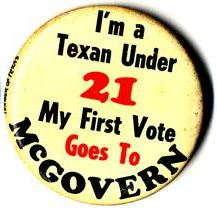
Hillary's workload of registering voters was large due to the 1972 presidential election being the first since the voting age was lowered from 21 to 18

Hillary was tasked with registering black and Hispanic voters in South Texas on behalf of the Democratic National Committee. With the 1972 election being the first in which 18-year-olds were able to vote, the task of voter registration was much greater than in other years. In addition to registering voters, as a law student, Clinton was utilized as a legal resource.

Hillary worked alongside Sara Ehrman, with whom she bonded. She also bonded with Betsey Wright while working on the campaign, with whom she frequently would travel to Barton Springs.

Bill, meanwhile, worked closely with Eddie Bernice Johnson. He also worked with Ron Kirk (future mayor of Dallas), Ann Richards (future governor of Texas). He additionally worked with Steven Spielberg who, at the time, was a little-known television producer. He traveled frequently across the state to organize events and to hang posters in county courthouses. He spent considerable time in Dallas, where he had an office in the campaign's local headquarters on Lemmon Avenue.

The Clintons worked with Garry Mauro, a University of Texas Law School student, on the campaign. Mauro would go on to later serve as Texas Land Commissioner, and would head Bill's 1992 campaign in Texas. They also worked alongside future Austin advertising executives Roy Spence and Judy Trabulsi, who would both go on to work on Bill Clinton's presidential campaigns. Spence would also work as a media adviser to Hillary in her 2008 presidential campaign, while Trablusi supported the candidacy of Barack Obama. Both worked in support of her 2016 presidential campaign.

While working in Texas, the Clintons also networked with some donors that would later contribute to their own campaigns for political office, such as Bernard Rapoport. Occasionally, Bill would receive phone calls from former president Lyndon B. Johnson, who would inquire about the campaign effort and offer advice. Both Clintons were absent from attending their fall classes that term in order to work for the campaign. However, they both managed to ace their finals.

=== Nixon campaign ===
Incumbent president Richard Nixon emphasized on a good economy and his successes in foreign affairs, such as coming near to ending American involvement in the Vietnam War and establishing relations with China. Though he had narrowly lost the state in 1968, Texas was beginning to trend Republican, with a lone Representative pickup and a pickup of a handful of state senate seats. He campaigned in Laredo at the Laredo Air Force Base, and he also visited Harlingen. Nixon had the support of former Democratic Texas governor John Connally, who headed the group Democrats for Nixon. Connally would, however, join the Republican party in 1973. Overall, Nixon's campaigning was less so than in 1968, as he rode a good economy and incumbency to a landslide victory in the state.

Among white voters, 73% supported Nixon while 26% supported McGovern.

== Results ==
1972 United States presidential election in Texas
Party	Candidate	Votes	Percentage	Electoral votes
Republican	Richard Nixon (incumbent)	2,298,896	66.20%	26
Democratic	George McGovern	1,154,291	33.24%	0
Socialist Workers	Linda Jenness	8,664	0.25%	0
Write-in	John G. Schmitz	7,098	0.20%	0
Write-ins	–	3,765	0.11%	0
Totals		3,472,714	100.00%	26
Voter turnout				—

=== Results by county ===
County	Richard Nixon Republican		George McGovern Democratic		Various candidates Other parties		Margin		Total votes cast
County	#	%	#	%	#	%	#	%	Total votes cast
Anderson	5,826	72.24%	2,233	27.69%	6	0.07%	3,593	44.55%	8,065
Andrews	2,615	79.00%	677	20.45%	18	0.54%	1,938	58.55%	3,310
Angelina	11,453	69.04%	4,970	29.96%	166	1.00%	6,483	39.08%	16,589
Aransas	2,037	70.48%	844	29.20%	9	0.31%	1,193	41.28%	2,890
Archer	1,494	69.42%	632	29.37%	26	1.21%	862	40.05%	2,152
Armstrong	768	80.76%	177	18.61%	6	0.63%	591	62.15%	951
Atascosa	3,400	65.28%	1,804	34.64%	4	0.08%	1,596	30.64%	5,208
Austin	3,084	74.24%	1,043	25.11%	27	0.65%	2,041	49.13%	4,154
Bailey	1,837	79.70%	465	20.17%	3	0.13%	1,372	59.53%	2,305
Bandera	1,796	79.50%	434	19.21%	29	1.28%	1,362	60.29%	2,259
Bastrop	3,097	61.82%	1,906	38.04%	7	0.14%	1,191	23.78%	5,010
Baylor	1,190	66.52%	598	33.43%	1	0.06%	592	33.09%	1,789
Bee	3,779	64.42%	2,067	35.24%	20	0.34%	1,712	29.18%	5,866
Bell	17,525	71.79%	6,848	28.05%	38	0.16%	10,677	43.74%	24,411
Bexar	137,572	59.76%	91,662	39.82%	959	0.42%	45,910	19.94%	230,193
Blanco	1,215	71.68%	460	27.14%	20	1.18%	755	44.54%	1,695
Borden	330	76.21%	96	22.17%	7	1.62%	234	54.04%	433
Bosque	2,947	74.12%	1,014	25.50%	15	0.38%	1,933	48.62%	3,976
Bowie	14,722	73.55%	5,227	26.12%	66	0.33%	9,495	47.43%	20,015
Brazoria	21,045	64.89%	11,350	35.00%	37	0.11%	9,695	29.89%	32,432
Brazos	14,243	71.03%	5,692	28.39%	116	0.58%	8,551	42.64%	20,051
Brewster	1,524	62.31%	904	36.96%	18	0.74%	620	25.35%	2,446
Briscoe	642	64.20%	349	34.90%	9	0.90%	293	29.30%	1,000
Brooks	1,117	40.17%	1,657	59.58%	7	0.25%	-540	-19.41%	2,781
Brown	5,990	72.76%	2,171	26.37%	72	0.87%	3,819	46.39%	8,233
Burleson	1,762	56.38%	1,361	43.55%	2	0.06%	401	12.83%	3,125
Burnet	3,438	73.34%	1,227	26.17%	23	0.49%	2,211	47.17%	4,688
Caldwell	3,171	61.45%	1,974	38.26%	15	0.29%	1,197	23.19%	5,160
Calhoun	3,614	64.93%	1,936	34.78%	16	0.29%	1,678	30.15%	5,566
Callahan	2,223	75.64%	665	22.63%	51	1.74%	1,558	53.01%	2,939
Cameron	20,816	60.69%	13,340	38.89%	144	0.42%	7,476	21.80%	34,300
Camp	1,599	60.55%	1,041	39.42%	1	0.04%	558	21.13%	2,641
Carson	1,868	75.75%	561	22.75%	37	1.50%	1,307	53.00%	2,466
Cass	5,303	72.76%	1,981	27.18%	4	0.05%	3,322	45.58%	7,288
Castro	1,685	68.75%	751	30.64%	15	0.61%	934	38.11%	2,451
Chambers	2,390	66.35%	1,206	33.48%	6	0.17%	1,184	32.87%	3,602
Cherokee	5,743	69.29%	2,467	29.77%	78	0.94%	3,276	39.52%	8,288
Childress	1,716	69.81%	729	29.66%	13	0.53%	987	40.15%	2,458
Clay	1,893	64.28%	1,023	34.74%	29	0.98%	870	29.54%	2,945
Cochran	1,106	72.01%	415	27.02%	15	0.98%	691	44.99%	1,536
Coke	761	67.11%	358	31.57%	15	1.32%	403	35.54%	1,134
Coleman	2,386	76.67%	721	23.17%	5	0.16%	1,665	53.50%	3,112
Collin	17,667	78.04%	4,783	21.13%	187	0.83%	12,884	56.91%	22,637
Collingsworth	1,250	71.39%	501	28.61%	0	0.00%	749	42.78%	1,751
Colorado	3,495	69.66%	1,502	29.94%	20	0.40%	1,993	39.72%	5,017
Comal	6,761	78.36%	1,823	21.13%	44	0.51%	4,938	57.23%	8,628
Comanche	2,608	68.31%	1,176	30.80%	34	0.89%	1,432	37.51%	3,818
Concho	709	66.95%	350	33.05%	0	0.00%	359	33.90%	1,059
Cooke	6,317	78.28%	1,702	21.09%	51	0.63%	4,615	57.19%	8,070
Coryell	5,077	79.75%	1,235	19.40%	54	0.85%	3,842	60.35%	6,366
Cottle	564	49.69%	571	50.31%	0	0.00%	-7	-0.62%	1,135
Crane	1,123	73.78%	349	22.93%	50	3.29%	774	50.85%	1,522
Crockett	851	72.12%	329	27.88%	0	0.00%	522	44.24%	1,180
Crosby	1,503	59.15%	1,021	40.18%	17	0.67%	482	18.97%	2,541
Culberson	555	69.12%	238	29.64%	10	1.25%	317	39.48%	803
Dallam	1,271	78.02%	327	20.07%	31	1.90%	944	57.95%	1,629
Dallas	305,112	69.53%	129,662	29.55%	4,021	0.92%	175,450	39.98%	438,795
Dawson	3,247	79.29%	846	20.66%	2	0.05%	2,401	58.63%	4,095
Deaf Smith	3,690	73.67%	1,240	24.76%	79	1.58%	2,450	48.91%	5,009
Delta	957	61.90%	581	37.58%	8	0.52%	376	24.32%	1,546
Denton	19,138	66.18%	9,720	33.61%	62	0.21%	9,418	32.57%	28,920
DeWitt	3,755	72.96%	1,357	26.36%	35	0.68%	2,398	46.60%	5,147
Dickens	708	56.87%	534	42.89%	3	0.24%	174	13.98%	1,245
Dimmit	1,172	51.81%	1,078	47.66%	12	0.53%	94	4.15%	2,262
Donley	1,229	77.74%	350	22.14%	2	0.13%	879	55.60%	1,581
Duval	623	14.32%	3,729	85.68%	0	0.00%	-3,106	-71.36%	4,352
Eastland	4,106	71.50%	1,630	28.38%	7	0.12%	2,476	43.12%	5,743
Ector	21,386	79.32%	5,449	20.21%	125	0.46%	15,937	59.11%	26,960
Edwards	520	82.02%	109	17.19%	5	0.79%	411	64.83%	634
Ellis	8,779	69.53%	3,839	30.41%	8	0.06%	4,940	39.12%	12,626
El Paso	49,981	60.15%	32,435	39.04%	674	0.81%	17,546	21.11%	83,090
Erath	4,777	74.26%	1,648	25.62%	8	0.12%	3,129	48.64%	6,433
Falls	3,017	62.12%	1,825	37.57%	15	0.31%	1,192	24.55%	4,857
Fannin	3,826	61.90%	2,295	37.13%	60	0.97%	1,531	24.77%	6,181
Fayette	3,882	73.37%	1,400	26.46%	9	0.17%	2,482	46.91%	5,291
Fisher	1,207	56.22%	933	43.46%	7	0.33%	274	12.76%	2,147
Floyd	2,181	72.17%	841	27.83%	0	0.00%	1,340	44.34%	3,022
Foard	369	53.87%	312	45.55%	4	0.58%	57	8.32%	685
Fort Bend	10,475	69.42%	4,541	30.09%	73	0.48%	5,934	39.33%	15,089
Franklin	1,059	65.90%	546	33.98%	2	0.12%	513	31.92%	1,607
Freestone	2,459	65.61%	1,283	34.23%	6	0.16%	1,176	31.38%	3,748
Frio	1,904	54.23%	1,588	45.23%	19	0.54%	316	9.00%	3,511
Gaines	1,923	73.26%	669	25.49%	33	1.26%	1,254	47.77%	2,625
Galveston	30,936	57.49%	22,565	41.93%	310	0.58%	8,371	15.56%	53,811
Garza	1,153	72.11%	446	27.89%	0	0.00%	707	44.22%	1,599
Gillespie	3,490	85.67%	526	12.91%	58	1.42%	2,964	72.76%	4,074
Glasscock	288	78.05%	75	20.33%	6	1.63%	213	57.72%	369
Goliad	1,018	68.60%	464	31.27%	2	0.13%	554	37.33%	1,484
Gonzales	2,707	69.84%	1,164	30.03%	5	0.13%	1,543	39.81%	3,876
Gray	7,968	84.37%	1,367	14.47%	109	1.15%	6,601	69.90%	9,444
Grayson	16,769	70.65%	6,952	29.29%	13	0.05%	9,817	41.36%	23,734
Gregg	19,927	77.49%	5,325	20.71%	464	1.80%	14,602	56.78%	25,716
Grimes	2,243	66.44%	1,116	33.06%	17	0.50%	1,127	33.38%	3,376
Guadalupe	8,287	70.84%	3,404	29.10%	7	0.06%	4,883	41.74%	11,698
Hale	7,051	76.04%	2,135	23.02%	87	0.94%	4,916	53.02%	9,273
Hall	1,303	67.37%	607	31.39%	24	1.24%	696	35.98%	1,934
Hamilton	1,931	73.79%	685	26.18%	1	0.04%	1,246	47.61%	2,617
Hansford	1,947	88.90%	202	9.22%	41	1.87%	1,745	79.68%	2,190
Hardeman	1,357	68.29%	614	30.90%	16	0.81%	743	37.39%	1,987
Hardin	5,190	63.63%	2,952	36.19%	15	0.18%	2,238	27.44%	8,157
Harris	365,672	62.56%	215,916	36.94%	2,943	0.50%	149,756	25.62%	584,531
Harrison	9,600	68.28%	4,333	30.82%	127	0.90%	5,267	37.46%	14,060
Hartley	946	80.17%	206	17.46%	28	2.37%	740	62.71%	1,180
Haskell	1,744	64.74%	950	35.26%	0	0.00%	794	29.48%	2,694
Hays	5,406	56.79%	4,068	42.74%	45	0.47%	1,338	14.05%	9,519
Hemphill	942	81.42%	214	18.50%	1	0.09%	728	62.92%	1,157
Henderson	6,263	69.49%	2,741	30.41%	9	0.10%	3,522	39.08%	9,013
Hidalgo	22,920	55.23%	18,366	44.26%	213	0.51%	4,554	10.97%	41,499
Hill	4,481	70.25%	1,882	29.50%	16	0.25%	2,599	40.75%	6,379
Hockley	4,084	70.84%	1,625	28.19%	56	0.97%	2,459	42.65%	5,765
Hood	1,743	64.32%	949	35.02%	18	0.66%	794	29.30%	2,710
Hopkins	3,903	69.20%	1,710	30.32%	27	0.48%	2,193	38.88%	5,640
Houston	3,317	63.95%	1,844	35.55%	26	0.50%	1,473	28.40%	5,187
Howard	7,343	72.85%	2,714	26.92%	23	0.23%	4,629	45.93%	10,080
Hudspeth	467	64.24%	250	34.39%	10	1.38%	217	29.85%	727
Hunt	9,535	72.02%	3,655	27.61%	49	0.37%	5,880	44.41%	13,239
Hutchinson	7,411	81.25%	1,405	15.40%	305	3.34%	6,006	65.85%	9,121
Irion	363	76.10%	111	23.27%	3	0.63%	252	52.83%	477
Jack	1,719	68.57%	775	30.91%	13	0.52%	944	37.66%	2,507
Jackson	2,743	69.81%	1,163	29.60%	23	0.59%	1,580	40.21%	3,929
Jasper	4,575	62.46%	2,746	37.49%	4	0.05%	1,829	24.97%	7,325
Jeff Davis	382	64.20%	202	33.95%	11	1.85%	180	30.25%	595
Jefferson	45,819	60.42%	29,909	39.44%	109	0.14%	15,910	20.98%	75,837
Jim Hogg	765	47.28%	848	52.41%	5	0.31%	-83	-5.13%	1,618
Jim Wells	5,283	54.48%	4,404	45.41%	11	0.11%	879	9.07%	9,698
Johnson	10,042	71.04%	3,968	28.07%	126	0.89%	6,074	42.97%	14,136
Jones	3,202	75.11%	1,050	24.63%	11	0.26%	2,152	50.48%	4,263
Karnes	2,639	59.60%	1,780	40.20%	9	0.20%	859	19.40%	4,428
Kaufman	5,100	64.51%	2,795	35.35%	11	0.14%	2,305	29.16%	7,906
Kendall	2,681	84.23%	484	15.21%	18	0.57%	2,197	69.02%	3,183
Kenedy	124	58.22%	88	41.31%	1	0.47%	36	16.91%	213
Kent	465	67.59%	223	32.41%	0	0.00%	242	35.18%	688
Kerr	6,039	77.82%	1,511	19.47%	210	2.71%	4,528	58.35%	7,760
Kimble	971	78.12%	266	21.40%	6	0.48%	705	56.72%	1,243
King	143	65.30%	75	34.25%	1	0.46%	68	31.05%	219
Kinney	425	64.39%	234	35.45%	1	0.15%	191	28.94%	660
Kleberg	5,312	54.19%	4,481	45.71%	10	0.10%	831	8.48%	9,803
Knox	1,148	63.78%	638	35.44%	14	0.78%	510	28.34%	1,800
Lamar	7,736	72.62%	2,865	26.90%	51	0.48%	4,871	45.72%	10,652
Lamb	3,981	74.19%	1,350	25.16%	35	0.65%	2,631	49.03%	5,366
Lampasas	2,251	76.33%	688	23.33%	10	0.34%	1,563	53.00%	2,949
La Salle	1,073	65.11%	567	34.41%	8	0.49%	506	30.70%	1,648
Lavaca	3,288	69.65%	1,429	30.27%	4	0.08%	1,859	39.38%	4,721
Lee	1,877	66.70%	920	32.69%	17	0.60%	957	34.01%	2,814
Leon	1,699	66.16%	863	33.61%	6	0.23%	836	32.55%	2,568
Liberty	6,111	64.79%	3,311	35.10%	10	0.11%	2,800	29.69%	9,432
Limestone	2,949	66.67%	1,452	32.83%	22	0.50%	1,497	33.84%	4,423
Lipscomb	1,226	87.57%	156	11.14%	18	1.29%	1,070	76.43%	1,400
Live Oak	1,745	73.97%	610	25.86%	4	0.17%	1,135	48.11%	2,359
Llano	2,164	73.53%	766	26.03%	13	0.44%	1,398	47.50%	2,943
Loving	55	88.71%	7	11.29%	0	0.00%	48	77.42%	62
Lubbock	43,564	73.47%	15,353	25.89%	379	0.64%	28,211	47.58%	59,296
Lynn	1,766	71.47%	697	28.21%	8	0.32%	1,069	43.26%	2,471
McCulloch	1,769	70.06%	753	29.82%	3	0.12%	1,016	40.24%	2,525
McLennan	33,377	67.45%	15,947	32.23%	161	0.33%	17,430	35.22%	49,485
McMullen	304	76.77%	88	22.22%	4	1.01%	216	54.55%	396
Madison	1,540	73.30%	561	26.70%	0	0.00%	979	46.60%	2,101
Marion	1,680	60.22%	1,106	39.64%	4	0.14%	574	20.58%	2,790
Martin	935	75.22%	287	23.09%	21	1.69%	648	52.13%	1,243
Mason	1,096	73.71%	369	24.82%	22	1.48%	727	48.89%	1,487
Matagorda	5,003	66.75%	2,473	33.00%	19	0.25%	2,530	33.75%	7,495
Maverick	1,477	46.20%	1,710	53.49%	10	0.31%	-233	-7.29%	3,197
Medina	4,059	71.85%	1,507	26.68%	83	1.47%	2,552	45.17%	5,649
Menard	644	69.92%	273	29.64%	4	0.43%	371	40.28%	921
Midland	18,905	79.60%	4,388	18.48%	457	1.92%	14,517	61.12%	23,750
Milam	3,554	62.14%	2,159	37.75%	6	0.10%	1,395	24.39%	5,719
Mills	1,089	73.43%	388	26.16%	6	0.40%	701	47.27%	1,483
Mitchell	1,790	71.83%	699	28.05%	3	0.12%	1,091	43.78%	2,492
Montague	3,463	72.63%	1,286	26.97%	19	0.40%	2,177	45.66%	4,768
Montgomery	15,067	77.48%	4,358	22.41%	22	0.11%	10,709	55.07%	19,447
Moore	3,620	79.77%	863	19.02%	55	1.21%	2,757	60.75%	4,538
Morris	2,699	69.47%	1,162	29.91%	24	0.62%	1,537	39.56%	3,885
Motley	657	72.52%	230	25.39%	19	2.10%	427	47.13%	906
Nacogdoches	8,757	70.41%	3,656	29.40%	24	0.19%	5,101	41.01%	12,437
Navarro	6,039	64.91%	3,246	34.89%	18	0.19%	2,793	30.02%	9,303
Newton	1,946	53.98%	1,636	45.38%	23	0.64%	310	8.60%	3,605
Nolan	3,634	73.03%	1,338	26.89%	4	0.08%	2,296	46.14%	4,976
Nueces	41,682	55.39%	33,277	44.22%	291	0.39%	8,405	11.17%	75,250
Ochiltree	2,861	89.35%	298	9.31%	43	1.34%	2,563	80.04%	3,202
Oldham	666	77.17%	173	20.05%	24	2.78%	493	57.12%	863
Orange	13,234	64.63%	7,172	35.02%	72	0.35%	6,062	29.61%	20,478
Palo Pinto	5,058	69.79%	2,181	30.10%	8	0.11%	2,877	39.69%	7,247
Panola	4,324	73.74%	1,511	25.77%	29	0.49%	2,813	47.97%	5,864
Parker	7,152	69.11%	3,184	30.77%	13	0.13%	3,968	38.34%	10,349
Parmer	2,304	81.62%	495	17.53%	24	0.85%	1,809	64.09%	2,823
Pecos	2,419	73.10%	847	25.60%	43	1.30%	1,572	47.50%	3,309
Polk	3,048	63.13%	1,760	36.45%	20	0.41%	1,288	26.68%	4,828
Potter	18,891	74.56%	6,264	24.72%	180	0.71%	12,627	49.84%	25,335
Presidio	785	53.69%	674	46.10%	3	0.21%	111	7.59%	1,462
Rains	865	61.61%	532	37.89%	7	0.50%	333	23.72%	1,404
Randall	18,557	83.13%	3,470	15.54%	296	1.33%	15,087	67.59%	22,323
Reagan	703	73.61%	244	25.55%	8	0.84%	459	48.06%	955
Real	483	75.23%	150	23.36%	9	1.40%	333	51.87%	642
Red River	3,112	69.54%	1,361	30.41%	2	0.04%	1,751	39.13%	4,475
Reeves	2,427	61.57%	1,510	38.31%	5	0.13%	917	23.26%	3,942
Refugio	1,937	64.57%	1,060	35.33%	3	0.10%	877	29.24%	3,000
Roberts	467	84.91%	71	12.91%	12	2.18%	396	72.00%	550
Robertson	1,977	50.01%	1,976	49.99%	0	0.00%	1	0.02%	3,953
Rockwall	1,890	75.06%	610	24.23%	18	0.71%	1,280	50.83%	2,518
Runnels	2,752	78.83%	739	21.17%	0	0.00%	2,013	57.66%	3,491
Rusk	8,179	73.87%	2,867	25.89%	26	0.23%	5,312	47.98%	11,072
Sabine	1,333	58.64%	936	41.18%	4	0.18%	397	17.46%	2,273
San Augustine	1,508	66.49%	753	33.20%	7	0.31%	755	33.29%	2,268
San Jacinto	1,296	55.81%	1,020	43.93%	6	0.26%	276	11.88%	2,322
San Patricio	7,179	57.42%	5,097	40.77%	226	1.81%	2,082	16.65%	12,502
San Saba	1,106	65.79%	567	33.73%	8	0.48%	539	32.06%	1,681
Schleicher	630	71.51%	250	28.38%	1	0.11%	380	43.13%	881
Scurry	3,777	74.79%	1,223	24.22%	50	0.99%	2,554	50.57%	5,050
Shackelford	909	73.07%	331	26.61%	4	0.32%	578	46.46%	1,244
Shelby	4,292	70.45%	1,792	29.42%	8	0.13%	2,500	41.03%	6,092
Sherman	996	84.34%	169	14.31%	16	1.35%	827	70.03%	1,181
Smith	23,671	74.37%	8,041	25.26%	115	0.36%	15,630	49.11%	31,827
Somervell	703	71.23%	284	28.77%	0	0.00%	419	42.46%	987
Starr	2,389	41.82%	3,320	58.11%	4	0.07%	-931	-16.29%	5,713
Stephens	2,259	76.73%	678	23.03%	7	0.24%	1,581	53.70%	2,944
Sterling	286	74.67%	94	24.54%	3	0.78%	192	50.13%	383
Stonewall	662	61.58%	394	36.65%	19	1.77%	268	24.93%	1,075
Sutton	705	73.67%	245	25.60%	7	0.73%	460	48.07%	957
Swisher	1,790	57.34%	1,300	41.64%	32	1.02%	490	15.70%	3,122
Tarrant	151,596	68.55%	69,187	31.29%	355	0.16%	82,409	37.26%	221,138
Taylor	22,417	78.02%	6,024	20.97%	290	1.01%	16,393	57.05%	28,731
Terrell	467	79.02%	124	20.98%	0	0.00%	343	58.04%	591
Terry	3,057	72.96%	1,099	26.23%	34	0.81%	1,958	46.73%	4,190
Throckmorton	568	61.81%	348	37.87%	3	0.33%	220	23.94%	919
Titus	3,671	68.07%	1,703	31.58%	19	0.35%	1,968	36.49%	5,393
Tom Green	15,784	71.87%	6,082	27.69%	95	0.43%	9,702	44.18%	21,961
Travis	70,561	56.30%	54,157	43.21%	611	0.49%	16,404	13.09%	125,329
Trinity	1,467	63.92%	826	35.99%	2	0.09%	641	27.93%	2,295
Tyler	2,955	68.88%	1,321	30.79%	14	0.33%	1,634	38.09%	4,290
Upshur	4,736	71.50%	1,879	28.37%	9	0.14%	2,857	43.13%	6,624
Upton	1,186	81.07%	256	17.50%	21	1.44%	930	63.57%	1,463
Uvalde	3,883	72.89%	1,438	26.99%	6	0.11%	2,445	45.90%	5,327
Val Verde	4,052	66.17%	2,049	33.46%	23	0.38%	2,003	32.71%	6,124
Van Zandt	4,839	71.33%	1,939	28.58%	6	0.09%	2,900	42.75%	6,784
Victoria	11,246	72.56%	4,226	27.27%	26	0.17%	7,020	45.29%	15,498
Walker	5,082	63.20%	2,940	36.56%	19	0.24%	2,142	26.64%	8,041
Waller	2,263	58.95%	1,538	40.06%	38	0.99%	725	18.89%	3,839
Ward	2,687	70.86%	1,049	27.66%	56	1.48%	1,638	43.20%	3,792
Washington	3,862	74.30%	1,323	25.45%	13	0.25%	2,539	48.85%	5,198
Webb	6,011	41.58%	8,435	58.34%	12	0.08%	-2,424	-16.76%	14,458
Wharton	6,271	64.27%	3,481	35.68%	5	0.05%	2,790	28.59%	9,757
Wheeler	1,766	77.87%	502	22.13%	0	0.00%	1,264	55.74%	2,268
Wichita	25,197	68.69%	10,948	29.85%	537	1.46%	14,249	38.84%	36,682
Wilbarger	3,183	70.44%	1,139	25.20%	197	4.36%	2,044	45.24%	4,519
Willacy	2,317	62.12%	1,384	37.10%	29	0.78%	933	25.02%	3,730
Williamson	6,998	64.40%	3,806	35.02%	63	0.58%	3,192	29.38%	10,867
Wilson	2,953	58.68%	2,072	41.18%	7	0.14%	881	17.50%	5,032
Winkler	2,467	79.71%	602	19.45%	26	0.84%	1,865	60.26%	3,095
Wise	4,230	70.43%	1,741	28.99%	35	0.58%	2,489	41.44%	6,006
Wood	4,746	71.28%	1,842	27.67%	70	1.05%	2,904	43.61%	6,658
Yoakum	1,952	79.90%	457	18.71%	34	1.39%	1,495	61.19%	2,443
Young	3,353	69.28%	1,486	30.70%	1	0.02%	1,867	38.58%	4,840
Zapata	695	47.51%	768	52.49%	0	0.00%	-73	-4.98%	1,463
Zavala	1,288	52.96%	1,122	46.13%	22	0.90%	166	6.83%	2,432
Totals	2,298,896	66.20%	1,154,291	33.24%	19,527	0.56%	1,144,605	32.96%	3,472,714

== See also ==
- United States presidential elections in Texas

== Works cited ==
- Black, Earl; Black, Merle (1992). The Vital South: How Presidents Are Elected. Harvard University Press. ISBN 0674941306.
