= Crowell High School =

Location
- 400 E Logan St. Crowell, Texas 79227-0239; United States; 33.99067°N 99.72067°W

Information
- School type: Public high school
- School district: Crowell Independent School District
- Principal: Craig Templeton
- Teaching staff: 21.79 (FTE)
- Grades: PK-12
- Enrollment: 196 (2023–2024)
- Student to teacher ratio: 8.99
- Colors: Black and gold
- Athletics conference: UIL Class 1 Division 2
- Mascot: Wildcat
- Website: Crowell High School

Crowell High School is a public high school located in Crowell, Texas USA and classified as a 1A school by the UIL. It is part of the Crowell Independent School District located in central Foard County . In 2015, the school was rated "Met Standard" by the Texas Education Agency.

== Athletics ==
The Crowell Wildcats compete in these sports -

Cross Country, 6-Man Football, Basketball, Golf, Tennis & Track

=== State titles ===
- Football -
  - 2013(6M/D1), 2014(6M/D1)
- Boys Track -
  - 1971(1A)
- One Act Play -
  - 1933(All)
