= Foard County, Texas =

County in Texas, United States

- County
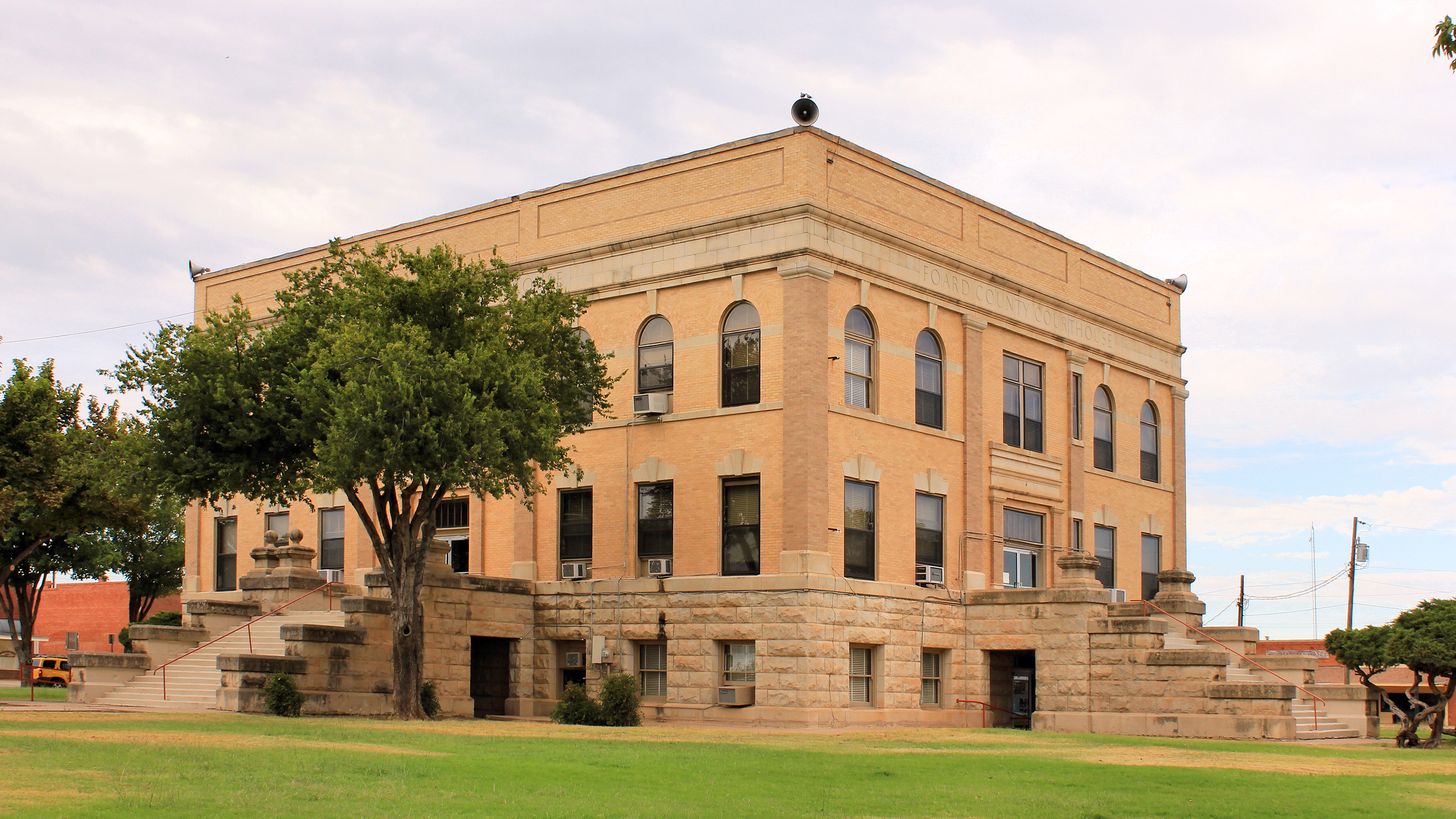
- The Foard County Courthouse in Crowell, Texas

- Location within the U.S. state of Texas
- Coordinates: 33°59′N 99°47′W
- Country: United States
- State: Texas
- Founded: 1891
- Named for: Robert Levi Foard
- Seat: Crowell
- Largest city: Crowell

Area
  - Total: 710 sq mi (1,830 km^{2})
  - Land: 704 sq mi (1,824 km^{2})
  - Water: 3.5 sq mi (9 km^{2}) 0.5%

Population (2020)
  - Total: 1,095
  - Estimate (2025): 1,044 ▼
  - Density: 1.532/sq mi (0.5914/km^{2})
- Time zone: UTC−6 (Central)
  - Summer (DST): UTC−5 (CDT)
- Congressional district: 13th
- Website: www.foardcounty.texas.gov

Foard County is a county located in the U.S. state of Texas. As of the 2020 census, its population was 1,095. Its county seat is Crowell, which is also the county's only incorporated community. The county is named for Robert Levi Foard, an attorney who served as a major with the Confederate Army, in the American Civil War.

Foard County was one of 46 prohibition, or entirely dry, counties in Texas until voters approved a referendum to permit the legal sale of alcoholic beverages in May 2006.

== Geography ==
According to the United States Census Bureau, the county has a total area of 708 square miles (1,830 km^{2}), of which 704 sq mi (1,820 km^{2}) are land and 3.3 sq mi (8.5 km^{2}) (0.5%) are covered by water.

=== Major highways ===
- U.S. Highway 70
- State Highway 6

=== Adjacent counties ===
- Hardeman County (north)
- Wilbarger County (east)
- Baylor County (southeast)
- Knox County (south)
- King County (southwest)
- Cottle County (west)

== Demographics ==
Historical population
Census	Pop.	Note	%±
1900	1,568		—
1910	5,726		265.2%
1920	4,747		−17.1%
1930	6,315		33.0%
1940	5,237		−17.1%
1950	4,216		−19.5%
1960	3,125		−25.9%
1970	2,211		−29.2%
1980	2,158		−2.4%
1990	1,794		−16.9%
2000	1,622		−9.6%
2010	1,336		−17.6%
2020	1,095		−18.0%
2025 (est.)	1,044	▼	−4.7%
U.S. Decennial Census; 1850–2010 2010–2020

=== Racial and ethnic composition ===
Foard County, Texas – Racial and ethnic composition Note: the US Census treats Hispanic/Latino as an ethnic category. This table excludes Latinos from the racial categories and assigns them to a separate category. Hispanics/Latinos may be of any race.
Race / Ethnicity (NH = Non-Hispanic)	Pop 1980	Pop 1990	Pop 2000	Pop 2010	Pop 2020	% 1980	% 1990	% 2000	% 2010	% 2020
White alone (NH)	1,778	1,478	1,277	1,087	845	82.39%	82.39%	78.73%	81.36%	77.17%
Black or African American alone (NH)	132	73	52	53	19	6.12%	4.07%	3.21%	3.97%	1.74%
Native American or Alaska Native alone (NH)	4	5	9	1	0	0.19%	0.28%	0.55%	0.07%	0.00%
Asian alone (NH)	2	4	3	4	3	0.09%	0.22%	0.18%	0.30%	0.27%
Native Hawaiian or Pacific Islander alone (NH)	x	x	0	0	1	x	x	0.00%	0.00%	0.09%
Other race alone (NH)	4	1	0	0	2	0.19%	0.06%	0.00%	0.00%	0.18%
Multiracial (NH)	x	x	16	4	28	x	x	0.99%	0.30%	2.56%
Hispanic or Latino (any race)	238	233	265	187	197	11.03%	12.99%	16.34%	14.00%	17.99%
Total	2,158	1,794	1,622	1,336	1,095	100.00%	100.00%	100.00%	100.00%	100.00%

=== 2020 census ===
As of the 2020 census, the county had a population of 1,095, and the median age was 52.0 years; 17.9% of the residents were under 18 and 29.0% were 65 age or older. For every 100 females, there were 96.9 males, and for every 100 females 18 and over, there were 95.0 males 18 and over.

The racial makeup of the county was 84.4% White, 1.7% Black or African American, <0.1% American Indian and Alaska Native, 0.5% Asian, 0.1% Native Hawaiian and Pacific Islander, 7.4% from some other race, and 5.9% from two or more races. Hispanic or Latino residents of any race comprised 18.0% of the population.

Fewer than 0.1% of residents lived in urban areas, while almost all lived in rural areas.

Of the 474 households in the county, 26.6% had children under 18 living in them, 47.3% were married-couple households, 20.9% were households with a male householder and no spouse or partner present, and 24.9% were households with a female householder and no spouse or partner present. About 28.7% of all households were made up of individuals, and 14.4% had someone living alone who was 65 or older.

The county had 571 housing units, of which 17.0% were vacant. Among occupied housing units, 73.2% were owner-occupied and 26.8% were renter-occupied. The homeowner vacancy rate was 2.2% and the rental vacancy rate was 6.6%.

=== 2000 census ===
As of the 2000 census, 1,622 people, 664 households, and 438 families resided in the county. The population density was two people per square mile (0.77 people/km^{2}). The 850 housing units averaged one units per square mile (0.39 units/km^{2}). The racial makeup of the county was 84.16% White, 3.27% Black or African American, 0.62% Native American, 0.18% Asian, 10.23% from other races, and 1.54% from two or more races. About 16.34% of the population was Hispanic or Latino of any race.

Of the 664 households, 29.1% had children under 18 living with them, 54.1% were married couples living together, 9.5% had a female householder with no husband present, and 34.0% were not families; 31.8% of all households were made up of individuals, and 19.3% had someone living alone who was 65 or older. The average household size was 2.38, and the average family size was 3.02.

In the county, the population was distributed as 25.8% under 18, 5.8% from 18 to 24, 22.3% from 25 to 44, 22.9% from 45 to 64, and 23.1% who were 65 or older. The median age was 42 years. For every 100 females, there were 86.4 males. For every 100 females 18 and over, there were 85.1 males.

The median income in the county for a household was $25,813 and for a family was $34,211. Males had a median income of $21,852 versus $16,450 for females. The per capita income for the county was $14,799. About 9.9% of families and 14.30% of the population were below the poverty line, including 14.5% of those under 18 and 16.2% of those 65 or over.

== Politics ==
Foard County is represented in the Texas House of Representatives by the Republican James Frank, a businessman from Wichita Falls.

Foard County was once a stronghold for the Democratic Party at both the state and federal levels, remaining so even as rural West Texas trended towards the Republican Party. It had only voted for Republicans in their 1972 and 1984 landslides in the 20th century. The county last voted for a Democratic presidential candidate when it gave its votes to Bill Clinton in 1996.

In the 21st century, the county began reliably voting for Republican presidential candidates, whose vote shares have steadily increased in every election. Barack Obama lost the county by a larger margin in 2008 than John Kerry in 2004, though Kerry ran against former governor of Texas George W. Bush. The Republican vote jumped to a record high of over 82% for Donald Trump in 2024.

United States presidential election results for Foard County, Texas
Year	Republican		Democratic		Third party(ies)	
Year	No.	%	No.	%	No.	%
1912	18	3.66%	429	87.20%	45	9.15%
1916	41	6.79%	475	78.64%	88	14.57%
1920	101	16.06%	491	78.06%	37	5.88%
1924	95	13.29%	585	81.82%	35	4.90%
1928	430	47.51%	466	51.49%	9	0.99%
1932	53	5.59%	882	93.04%	13	1.37%
1936	74	7.36%	928	92.34%	3	0.30%
1940	142	12.47%	997	87.53%	0	0.00%
1944	84	7.78%	925	85.65%	71	6.57%
1948	90	10.27%	751	85.73%	35	4.00%
1952	418	33.28%	830	66.08%	8	0.64%
1956	243	26.07%	687	73.71%	2	0.21%
1960	270	27.14%	723	72.66%	2	0.20%
1964	146	14.90%	833	85.00%	1	0.10%
1968	216	22.09%	594	60.74%	168	17.18%
1972	369	53.87%	312	45.55%	4	0.58%
1976	240	25.26%	706	74.32%	4	0.42%
1980	349	35.69%	617	63.09%	12	1.23%
1984	472	51.03%	448	48.43%	5	0.54%
1988	306	37.32%	513	62.56%	1	0.12%
1992	207	26.01%	435	54.65%	154	19.35%
1996	166	28.97%	355	61.95%	52	9.08%
2000	286	51.44%	263	47.30%	7	1.26%
2004	347	59.11%	235	40.03%	5	0.85%
2008	327	60.78%	198	36.80%	13	2.42%
2012	348	70.30%	140	28.28%	7	1.41%
2016	383	74.66%	113	22.03%	17	3.31%
2020	445	80.76%	99	17.97%	7	1.27%
2024	448	82.20%	92	16.88%	5	0.92%

United States Senate election results for Foard County, Texas1
Year	Republican		Democratic		Third party(ies)	
Year	No.	%	No.	%	No.	%
2018	321	73.79%	113	25.98%	1	0.23%
2024	438	81.41%	94	17.47%	6	1.12%

United States Senate election results for Foard County, Texas2
Year	Republican		Democratic		Third party(ies)	
Year	No.	%	No.	%	No.	%
2020	404	77.84%	107	20.62%	8	1.54%
2026	306	75.18%	90	22.11%	11	2.70%

Texas Gubernatorial election results for Foard County
Year	Republican		Democratic		Third party(ies)	
Year	No.	%	No.	%	No.	%
1990	182	28.62%	454	71.38%	0	0.00%
1994	187	35.02%	347	64.98%	0	0.00%
1998	205	49.88%	206	50.12%	0	0.00%
2002	136	37.47%	227	62.53%	0	0.00%
2006	87	34.39%	166	65.61%	0	0.00%
2010	148	49.17%	153	50.83%	0	0.00%
2014	205	66.78%	102	33.22%	0	0.00%
2018	331	76.62%	101	23.38%	0	0.00%
2022	452	85.44%	69	13.04%	8	1.51%
2026	318	77.37%	85	20.68%	8	1.95%

At the statewide level, most notably in gubernatorial races, the county was one of the few rural ones that continued to give its votes to Democratic candidates in West Texas, even as it trended Republican on the national level. For instance, during the landslide re-election of then-governor George W. Bush in 1998, it was one of only 14 counties that gave its votes to Bush's Democratic challenger Garry Mauro, albeit by one vote. The county continued this trend through all of Rick Perry's three gubernatorial landslide elections in 2002, 2006, and 2010. This streak ended in 2014, when the county gave its votes to then-Attorney General Greg Abbott, who won 66% of the popular vote over Wendy Davis's 33%. It went on to vote for Abbott's re-election in 2018 and 2022, giving him over 75 and 85% of its popular vote, respectively, even as his statewide margins decreased with each election.

Foard County is located within District 69 of the Texas House of Representatives and District 28 of the Texas Senate.

== Attractions ==
- Copper Breaks State Park is located near the Pease River about 8 miles north of Crowell off State Highway 6. The park is located in neighboring Hardeman County.
- Comanche Springs Astronomy Campus is located 10 miles west of Crowell off U.S. Highway 70. It is operated as part of the 3 Rivers Ranch by the Texas Tech University System.

== Communities ==
- Crowell (county seat)
- Thalia

== Education ==
School districts serving sections of the county include:

- Crowell Independent School District
- Vernon Independent School District

The county is in the service area of Vernon College.

== See also ==
- Recorded Texas Historic Landmarks in Foard County
