= 1984 United States presidential election in Texas =

- November 6, 1984
- Turnout: 68.32% (of registered voters) ▼47.55% (of voting age population)

Nominee	Ronald Reagan	Walter Mondale
Party	Republican	Democratic
Home state	California	Minnesota
Running mate	George H. W. Bush	Geraldine Ferraro
Electoral vote	29	0
Popular vote	3,433,428	1,949,276
Percentage	63.61%	36.11%

Reagan
50–60%
60–70%
70–80%
80–90%
Mondale
50–60%
60–70%
70–80%
President before election
Ronald Reagan
Republican
Elected President
Ronald Reagan
Republican

The 1984 United States presidential election in Texas took place on November 6, 1984. All fifty states and the District of Columbia, were part of the 1984 United States presidential election. Texas voters chose 29 electors to the Electoral College, which selected the president and vice president of the United States.

Texas was won by incumbent United States President Ronald Reagan of California, who was running against former Vice President Walter Mondale of Minnesota. Reagan ran for a second time with incumbent Vice President and former C.I.A. Director George H. W. Bush of Texas, and Mondale ran with Representative Geraldine Ferraro of New York, the first major female candidate for the vice presidency.

Reagan carried Texas by a landslide margin of 27.5%; his 63.61% vote share made it his thirteenth-best state, and his second-best amongst states of the Old Confederacy, states that had voted for Carter in 1976, and states with at least 10 electoral votes (in each case, after Florida). Reagan performed strongly in the state's population centers; the state's three largest counties--Harris, Dallas, and Tarrant—had all become Republican strongholds in the state by this time (Ford carried all three while losing the state in 1976), and all gave Reagan over 60% of the vote. However, he also won the swing county of Bexar (San Antonio), which had voted for Carter in 1976, by double digits; and he flipped typically Democratic Travis County (Austin), whose last two Republican votes had been in 1972 and 1956, winning it, too, by double digits.

Mondale did retain some strength in some of the rural areas of Texas. Much of this strength was in the Rio Grande Valley. However, Mondale also carried a handful of the rural, largely white and Protestant counties "[lying] away from the Mexican border" that Democrats up to that point typically could not win Texas without. Mondale carried a handful of counties in East Texas, for example, of which two (Orange and Newton) had voted for George Wallace in 1968. He also retained a handful of ancestrally Democratic counties in West Texas, in or directly south of the Panhandle. In a series of other rural counties which had voted for Carter twice, Mondale kept the margins narrow, such as in Jasper (which had also voted for Wallace), Fannin, and Waller (to name the largest ones). As of the 2024 presidential election, this is the last time that El Paso County voted for a Republican candidate.

Among white voters, 70% supported Reagan while 30% supported Mondale.

== Results ==
1984 United States presidential election in Texas
Party	Candidate	Votes	Percentage	Electoral votes
Republican	Ronald Reagan (incumbent)	3,433,428	63.61%	29
Democratic	Walter Mondale	1,949,276	36.11%	0
Independent	Lyndon LaRouche	14,613	0.27%	0
Communist Party	Gus Hall (write-in)	126	<0.01%	0
Citizen's Party	Sonia Johnson (write-in)	87	<0.01%	0
New Alliance Party	Dennis Serrette (write-in)	41	<0.01%	0
Totals		5,397,571	100.0%	29

=== Results by county ===
County	Ronald Reagan Republican		Walter Mondale Democratic		Various candidates Other parties		Margin		Total
County	#	%	#	%	#	%	#	%	Total
Anderson	8,634	64.32%	4,747	35.36%	42	0.31%	3,887	28.96%	13,423
Andrews	3,918	82.48%	820	17.26%	12	0.25%	3,098	65.22%	4,750
Angelina	14,685	61.62%	9,054	37.99%	92	0.39%	5,631	23.63%	23,831
Aransas	4,352	71.73%	1,696	27.95%	19	0.31%	2,656	43.78%	6,067
Archer	2,487	69.33%	1,089	30.36%	11	0.31%	1,398	38.97%	3,587
Armstrong	791	76.50%	238	23.02%	5	0.48%	553	53.48%	1,034
Atascosa	5,279	59.68%	3,547	40.10%	19	0.21%	1,732	19.58%	8,845
Austin	4,872	71.29%	1,941	28.40%	21	0.31%	2,931	42.89%	6,834
Bailey	1,888	73.01%	684	26.45%	14	0.54%	1,204	46.56%	2,586
Bandera	3,152	80.04%	771	19.58%	15	0.38%	2,381	60.46%	3,938
Bastrop	6,439	57.38%	4,744	42.28%	38	0.34%	1,695	15.10%	11,221
Baylor	1,314	56.01%	1,019	43.44%	13	0.55%	295	12.57%	2,346
Bee	5,377	59.32%	3,659	40.37%	28	0.31%	1,718	18.95%	9,064
Bell	31,117	69.52%	13,322	29.76%	323	0.72%	17,795	39.76%	44,762
Bexar	203,319	59.65%	136,947	40.18%	560	0.16%	66,372	19.47%	340,826
Blanco	1,957	73.43%	700	26.27%	8	0.30%	1,257	47.16%	2,665
Borden	325	69.44%	140	29.91%	3	0.64%	185	39.53%	468
Bosque	3,923	65.57%	2,046	34.20%	14	0.23%	1,877	31.37%	5,983
Bowie	18,244	64.22%	10,077	35.47%	88	0.31%	8,167	28.75%	28,409
Brazoria	39,166	67.52%	18,609	32.08%	234	0.40%	20,557	35.44%	58,009
Brazos	34,733	73.55%	12,348	26.15%	140	0.30%	22,385	47.40%	47,221
Brewster	2,066	58.28%	1,462	41.24%	17	0.48%	604	17.04%	3,545
Briscoe	538	52.90%	471	46.31%	8	0.79%	67	6.59%	1,017
Brooks	896	24.79%	2,702	74.76%	16	0.44%	-1,806	-49.97%	3,614
Brown	8,468	67.29%	4,070	32.34%	47	0.37%	4,398	34.95%	12,585
Burleson	3,076	54.29%	2,578	45.50%	12	0.21%	498	8.79%	5,666
Burnet	5,895	66.18%	2,983	33.49%	29	0.33%	2,912	32.69%	8,907
Caldwell	4,315	55.81%	3,401	43.99%	16	0.21%	914	11.82%	7,732
Calhoun	4,434	62.99%	2,586	36.74%	19	0.27%	1,848	26.25%	7,039
Callahan	3,538	72.69%	1,305	26.81%	24	0.49%	2,233	45.88%	4,867
Cameron	29,545	52.64%	26,394	47.03%	187	0.33%	3,151	5.61%	56,126
Camp	2,238	53.69%	1,917	45.99%	13	0.31%	321	7.70%	4,168
Carson	2,412	74.12%	826	25.38%	16	0.49%	1,586	48.74%	3,254
Cass	6,677	56.78%	5,053	42.97%	30	0.26%	1,624	13.81%	11,760
Castro	2,026	66.30%	1,009	33.02%	21	0.69%	1,017	33.28%	3,056
Chambers	4,322	61.84%	2,632	37.66%	35	0.50%	1,690	24.18%	6,989
Cherokee	8,187	64.41%	4,494	35.36%	30	0.24%	3,693	29.05%	12,711
Childress	1,574	63.44%	900	36.28%	7	0.28%	674	27.16%	2,481
Clay	2,569	58.04%	1,844	41.66%	13	0.29%	725	16.38%	4,426
Cochran	1,117	66.13%	557	32.98%	15	0.89%	560	33.15%	1,689
Coke	1,060	66.25%	532	33.25%	8	0.50%	528	33.00%	1,600
Coleman	2,790	66.16%	1,420	33.67%	7	0.17%	1,370	32.49%	4,217
Collin	61,095	81.64%	13,604	18.18%	139	0.19%	47,491	63.46%	74,838
Collingsworth	1,396	64.96%	742	34.53%	11	0.51%	654	30.43%	2,149
Colorado	4,528	64.95%	2,428	34.83%	15	0.22%	2,100	30.12%	6,971
Comal	13,452	76.07%	4,179	23.63%	52	0.29%	9,273	52.44%	17,683
Comanche	2,678	54.12%	2,248	45.43%	22	0.44%	430	8.69%	4,948
Concho	821	58.31%	580	41.19%	7	0.50%	241	17.12%	1,408
Cooke	8,260	71.43%	3,278	28.35%	26	0.22%	4,982	43.08%	11,564
Coryell	9,056	74.24%	3,113	25.52%	30	0.25%	5,943	48.72%	12,199
Cottle	507	44.09%	623	54.17%	20	1.74%	-116	-10.08%	1,150
Crane	1,473	78.60%	392	20.92%	9	0.48%	1,081	57.68%	1,874
Crockett	1,094	64.96%	589	34.98%	1	0.06%	505	29.98%	1,684
Crosby	1,376	52.94%	1,212	46.63%	11	0.42%	164	6.31%	2,599
Culberson	509	55.51%	407	44.38%	1	0.11%	102	11.13%	917
Dallam	1,594	75.80%	496	23.59%	13	0.62%	1,098	52.21%	2,103
Dallas	405,444	66.41%	203,592	33.35%	1,460	0.24%	201,852	33.06%	610,496
Dawson	3,685	67.21%	1,781	32.48%	17	0.31%	1,904	34.73%	5,483
Deaf Smith	4,762	75.79%	1,485	23.64%	36	0.57%	3,277	52.15%	6,283
Delta	1,024	51.17%	973	48.63%	4	0.20%	51	2.54%	2,001
Denton	52,865	75.74%	16,772	24.03%	159	0.23%	36,093	51.71%	69,796
DeWitt	4,401	69.95%	1,882	29.91%	9	0.14%	2,519	40.04%	6,292
Dickens	594	45.90%	692	53.48%	8	0.62%	-98	-7.58%	1,294
Dimmit	1,338	34.38%	2,546	65.42%	8	0.21%	-1,208	-31.04%	3,892
Donley	1,297	70.84%	529	28.89%	5	0.27%	768	41.95%	1,831
Duval	1,201	24.22%	3,748	75.58%	10	0.20%	-2,547	-51.36%	4,959
Eastland	4,841	65.52%	2,522	34.13%	26	0.35%	2,319	31.39%	7,389
Ector	31,228	77.41%	8,913	22.09%	201	0.50%	22,315	55.32%	40,342
Edwards	626	79.64%	159	20.23%	1	0.13%	467	59.41%	786
Ellis	16,873	67.56%	8,029	32.15%	72	0.29%	8,844	35.41%	24,974
El Paso	66,114	55.83%	51,917	43.84%	399	0.34%	14,197	11.99%	118,430
Erath	6,122	65.16%	3,234	34.42%	39	0.42%	2,888	30.74%	9,395
Falls	3,133	52.34%	2,834	47.34%	19	0.32%	299	5.00%	5,986
Fannin	4,692	51.53%	4,399	48.31%	15	0.16%	293	3.22%	9,106
Fayette	5,711	70.40%	2,379	29.33%	22	0.27%	3,332	41.07%	8,112
Fisher	965	40.94%	1,384	58.72%	8	0.34%	-419	-17.78%	2,357
Floyd	2,092	66.75%	1,023	32.64%	19	0.61%	1,069	34.11%	3,134
Foard	472	51.03%	448	48.43%	5	0.54%	24	2.60%	925
Fort Bend	41,370	68.71%	18,729	31.11%	110	0.18%	22,641	37.60%	60,209
Franklin	1,836	62.28%	1,104	37.45%	8	0.27%	732	24.83%	2,948
Freestone	3,624	59.20%	2,489	40.66%	9	0.15%	1,135	18.54%	6,122
Frio	2,003	42.90%	2,656	56.89%	10	0.21%	-653	-13.99%	4,669
Gaines	2,714	76.82%	797	22.56%	22	0.62%	1,917	54.26%	3,533
Galveston	40,262	52.40%	36,092	46.97%	482	0.63%	4,170	5.43%	76,836
Garza	1,219	69.66%	521	29.77%	10	0.57%	698	39.89%	1,750
Gillespie	5,496	82.63%	1,137	17.10%	18	0.27%	4,359	65.53%	6,651
Glasscock	403	75.19%	128	23.88%	5	0.93%	275	51.31%	536
Goliad	1,540	64.79%	836	35.17%	1	0.04%	704	29.62%	2,377
Gonzales	3,962	64.19%	2,196	35.58%	14	0.23%	1,766	28.61%	6,172
Gray	8,955	81.50%	2,003	18.23%	30	0.27%	6,952	63.27%	10,988
Grayson	22,554	65.47%	11,803	34.26%	93	0.27%	10,751	31.21%	34,450
Gregg	29,697	73.07%	10,700	26.33%	246	0.61%	18,997	46.74%	40,643
Grimes	3,365	58.50%	2,370	41.20%	17	0.30%	995	17.30%	5,752
Guadalupe	14,382	73.80%	5,060	25.96%	46	0.24%	9,322	47.84%	19,488
Hale	7,670	70.43%	3,202	29.40%	19	0.17%	4,468	41.03%	10,891
Hall	1,058	51.74%	984	48.12%	3	0.15%	74	3.62%	2,045
Hamilton	2,118	65.01%	1,130	34.68%	10	0.31%	988	30.33%	3,258
Hansford	2,213	89.38%	259	10.46%	4	0.16%	1,954	78.92%	2,476
Hardeman	1,238	56.97%	927	42.66%	8	0.37%	311	14.31%	2,173
Hardin	8,380	55.11%	6,782	44.60%	44	0.29%	1,598	10.51%	15,206
Harris	536,029	61.46%	334,135	38.31%	2,003	0.23%	201,894	23.15%	872,167
Harrison	12,618	61.52%	7,773	37.90%	118	0.58%	4,845	23.62%	20,509
Hartley	1,419	79.45%	356	19.93%	11	0.62%	1,063	59.52%	1,786
Haskell	1,701	53.98%	1,434	45.51%	16	0.51%	267	8.47%	3,151
Hays	12,467	64.98%	6,663	34.73%	57	0.30%	5,804	30.25%	19,187
Hemphill	1,650	79.83%	413	19.98%	4	0.19%	1,237	59.85%	2,067
Henderson	12,725	63.38%	7,302	36.37%	49	0.24%	5,423	27.01%	20,076
Hidalgo	35,059	44.14%	44,147	55.58%	226	0.28%	-9,088	-11.44%	79,432
Hill	5,344	60.80%	3,420	38.91%	26	0.30%	1,924	21.89%	8,790
Hockley	5,462	72.39%	2,044	27.09%	39	0.52%	3,418	45.30%	7,545
Hood	6,817	68.71%	3,063	30.87%	41	0.41%	3,754	37.84%	9,921
Hopkins	5,772	60.80%	3,707	39.05%	14	0.15%	2,065	21.75%	9,493
Houston	4,542	57.98%	3,275	41.80%	17	0.22%	1,267	16.18%	7,834
Howard	7,519	64.31%	4,115	35.20%	57	0.49%	3,404	29.11%	11,691
Hudspeth	557	60.35%	362	39.22%	4	0.43%	195	21.13%	923
Hunt	14,303	67.08%	6,971	32.69%	48	0.23%	7,332	34.39%	21,322
Hutchinson	9,078	81.26%	2,052	18.37%	41	0.37%	7,026	62.89%	11,171
Irion	619	75.30%	199	24.21%	4	0.49%	420	51.09%	822
Jack	1,825	65.67%	945	34.01%	9	0.32%	880	31.66%	2,779
Jackson	3,661	66.83%	1,804	32.93%	13	0.24%	1,857	33.90%	5,478
Jasper	5,965	50.64%	5,787	49.13%	27	0.23%	178	1.51%	11,779
Jeff Davis	511	62.70%	299	36.69%	5	0.61%	212	26.01%	815
Jefferson	45,124	45.03%	54,846	54.73%	245	0.24%	-9,722	-9.70%	100,215
Jim Hogg	608	26.29%	1,703	73.63%	2	0.09%	-1,095	-47.34%	2,313
Jim Wells	5,896	42.99%	7,795	56.84%	24	0.17%	-1,899	-13.85%	13,715
Johnson	18,254	66.44%	9,148	33.30%	72	0.26%	9,106	33.14%	27,474
Jones	4,017	62.93%	2,343	36.71%	23	0.36%	1,674	26.22%	6,383
Karnes	3,068	62.84%	1,802	36.91%	12	0.25%	1,266	25.93%	4,882
Kaufman	9,343	62.55%	5,554	37.18%	41	0.27%	3,789	25.37%	14,938
Kendall	4,568	82.72%	938	16.99%	16	0.29%	3,630	65.73%	5,522
Kenedy	96	46.38%	110	53.14%	1	0.48%	-14	-6.76%	207
Kent	332	56.46%	253	43.03%	3	0.51%	79	13.43%	588
Kerr	11,829	79.00%	3,102	20.72%	43	0.29%	8,727	58.28%	14,974
Kimble	1,333	74.72%	442	24.78%	9	0.50%	891	49.94%	1,784
King	141	72.68%	53	27.32%	0	0.00%	88	45.36%	194
Kinney	774	61.28%	486	38.48%	3	0.24%	288	22.80%	1,263
Kleberg	5,712	53.48%	4,924	46.10%	45	0.42%	788	7.38%	10,681
Knox	1,027	52.61%	921	47.18%	4	0.20%	106	5.43%	1,952
Lamar	9,273	62.57%	5,504	37.14%	43	0.29%	3,769	25.43%	14,820
Lamb	3,892	66.78%	1,919	32.93%	17	0.29%	1,973	33.85%	5,828
Lampasas	3,285	70.60%	1,356	29.14%	12	0.26%	1,929	41.46%	4,653
La Salle	1,007	40.06%	1,504	59.82%	3	0.12%	-497	-19.76%	2,514
Lavaca	5,058	67.15%	2,464	32.71%	10	0.13%	2,594	34.44%	7,532
Lee	2,967	64.05%	1,659	35.82%	6	0.13%	1,308	28.23%	4,632
Leon	3,207	63.66%	1,821	36.15%	10	0.20%	1,386	27.51%	5,038
Liberty	10,504	62.28%	6,292	37.31%	70	0.42%	4,212	24.97%	16,866
Limestone	4,063	55.62%	3,228	44.19%	14	0.19%	835	11.43%	7,305
Lipscomb	1,461	85.54%	241	14.11%	6	0.35%	1,220	71.43%	1,708
Live Oak	2,481	66.00%	1,260	33.52%	18	0.48%	1,221	32.48%	3,759
Llano	4,042	67.89%	1,894	31.81%	18	0.30%	2,148	36.08%	5,954
Loving	57	78.08%	16	21.92%	0	0.00%	41	56.16%	73
Lubbock	57,151	74.98%	18,793	24.66%	275	0.36%	38,358	50.32%	76,219
Lynn	1,617	61.48%	1,009	38.37%	4	0.15%	608	23.11%	2,630
McCulloch	2,060	58.82%	1,433	40.92%	9	0.26%	627	17.90%	3,502
McLennan	42,232	64.40%	23,206	35.39%	140	0.21%	19,026	29.01%	65,578
McMullen	337	84.67%	61	15.33%	0	0.00%	276	69.34%	398
Madison	2,158	60.74%	1,384	38.95%	11	0.31%	774	21.79%	3,553
Marion	2,336	52.34%	2,111	47.30%	16	0.36%	225	5.04%	4,463
Martin	1,218	70.00%	512	29.43%	10	0.57%	706	40.57%	1,740
Mason	1,168	67.01%	570	32.70%	5	0.29%	598	34.31%	1,743
Matagorda	8,452	61.72%	5,201	37.98%	41	0.30%	3,251	23.74%	13,694
Maverick	1,783	36.68%	3,063	63.01%	15	0.31%	-1,280	-26.33%	4,861
Medina	5,737	65.17%	3,053	34.68%	13	0.15%	2,684	30.49%	8,803
Menard	725	64.44%	394	35.02%	6	0.53%	331	29.42%	1,125
Midland	33,706	82.13%	7,214	17.58%	119	0.29%	26,492	64.55%	41,039
Milam	4,384	53.86%	3,734	45.87%	22	0.27%	650	7.99%	8,140
Mills	1,262	64.39%	688	35.10%	10	0.51%	574	29.29%	1,960
Mitchell	2,007	59.79%	1,332	39.68%	18	0.54%	675	20.11%	3,357
Montague	4,406	62.67%	2,602	37.01%	22	0.31%	1,804	25.66%	7,030
Montgomery	41,230	75.39%	13,293	24.31%	167	0.31%	27,937	51.08%	54,690
Moore	4,649	80.21%	1,129	19.48%	18	0.31%	3,520	60.73%	5,796
Morris	2,778	48.51%	2,925	51.07%	24	0.42%	-147	-2.56%	5,727
Motley	533	65.08%	282	34.43%	4	0.49%	251	30.65%	819
Nacogdoches	13,063	69.44%	5,694	30.27%	55	0.29%	7,369	39.17%	18,812
Navarro	7,816	57.86%	5,672	41.99%	21	0.16%	2,144	15.87%	13,509
Newton	2,123	39.03%	3,296	60.60%	20	0.37%	-1,173	-21.57%	5,439
Nolan	3,608	58.80%	2,524	41.13%	4	0.07%	1,084	17.67%	6,136
Nueces	54,333	53.68%	46,721	46.16%	159	0.16%	7,612	7.52%	101,213
Ochiltree	3,492	89.15%	419	10.70%	6	0.15%	3,073	78.45%	3,917
Oldham	762	76.97%	226	22.83%	2	0.20%	536	54.14%	990
Orange	15,386	47.63%	16,816	52.06%	101	0.31%	-1,430	-4.43%	32,303
Palo Pinto	5,701	62.81%	3,349	36.90%	27	0.30%	2,352	25.91%	9,077
Panola	5,676	63.88%	3,179	35.78%	30	0.34%	2,497	28.10%	8,885
Parker	13,647	69.07%	6,050	30.62%	62	0.31%	7,597	38.45%	19,759
Parmer	2,524	81.37%	567	18.28%	11	0.35%	1,957	63.09%	3,102
Pecos	3,451	67.93%	1,596	31.42%	33	0.65%	1,855	36.51%	5,080
Polk	5,987	60.36%	3,898	39.30%	33	0.33%	2,089	21.06%	9,918
Potter	20,396	70.57%	8,365	28.94%	141	0.49%	12,031	41.63%	28,902
Presidio	837	44.01%	992	52.16%	73	3.84%	-155	-8.15%	1,902
Rains	1,560	60.21%	1,027	39.64%	4	0.15%	533	20.57%	2,591
Randall	30,249	83.08%	6,044	16.60%	116	0.32%	24,205	66.48%	36,409
Reagan	1,079	81.50%	243	18.35%	2	0.15%	836	63.15%	1,324
Real	1,004	73.34%	360	26.30%	5	0.37%	644	47.04%	1,369
Red River	2,979	54.05%	2,518	45.68%	15	0.27%	461	8.37%	5,512
Reeves	2,461	50.51%	2,396	49.18%	15	0.31%	65	1.33%	4,872
Refugio	2,421	60.71%	1,559	39.09%	8	0.20%	862	21.62%	3,988
Roberts	539	83.57%	106	16.43%	0	0.00%	433	67.14%	645
Robertson	2,663	44.27%	3,339	55.50%	14	0.23%	-676	-11.23%	6,016
Rockwall	6,688	80.11%	1,639	19.63%	22	0.26%	5,049	60.48%	8,349
Runnels	2,968	71.06%	1,179	28.23%	30	0.72%	1,789	42.83%	4,177
Rusk	11,081	70.40%	4,599	29.22%	61	0.39%	6,482	41.18%	15,741
Sabine	2,045	51.21%	1,940	48.59%	8	0.20%	105	2.62%	3,993
San Augustine	1,937	54.89%	1,583	44.86%	9	0.26%	354	10.03%	3,529
San Jacinto	3,174	56.09%	2,466	43.58%	19	0.34%	708	12.51%	5,659
San Patricio	11,074	55.48%	8,838	44.27%	50	0.25%	2,236	11.21%	19,962
San Saba	1,566	59.16%	1,070	40.42%	11	0.42%	496	18.74%	2,647
Schleicher	854	71.95%	326	27.46%	7	0.59%	528	44.49%	1,187
Scurry	5,028	75.85%	1,564	23.59%	37	0.56%	3,464	52.26%	6,629
Shackelford	1,181	73.63%	415	25.87%	8	0.50%	766	47.76%	1,604
Shelby	4,863	57.21%	3,610	42.47%	28	0.33%	1,253	14.74%	8,501
Sherman	1,269	83.27%	246	16.14%	9	0.59%	1,023	67.13%	1,524
Smith	40,740	72.60%	15,227	27.13%	152	0.27%	25,513	45.47%	56,119
Somervell	1,422	69.00%	635	30.81%	4	0.19%	787	38.19%	2,061
Starr	1,658	24.70%	5,047	75.18%	8	0.12%	-3,389	-50.48%	6,713
Stephens	2,898	73.27%	1,046	26.45%	11	0.28%	1,852	46.82%	3,955
Sterling	577	81.27%	129	18.17%	4	0.56%	448	63.10%	710
Stonewall	599	48.15%	643	51.69%	2	0.16%	-44	-3.54%	1,244
Sutton	1,251	72.69%	465	27.02%	5	0.29%	786	45.67%	1,721
Swisher	1,611	49.40%	1,642	50.35%	8	0.25%	-31	-0.95%	3,261
Tarrant	248,050	67.25%	120,147	32.57%	665	0.18%	127,903	34.68%	368,862
Taylor	34,444	77.92%	9,628	21.78%	130	0.29%	24,816	56.14%	44,202
Terrell	407	58.31%	289	41.40%	2	0.29%	118	16.91%	698
Terry	3,181	67.34%	1,535	32.49%	8	0.17%	1,646	34.85%	4,724
Throckmorton	586	59.86%	388	39.63%	5	0.51%	198	20.23%	979
Titus	5,069	58.08%	3,631	41.61%	27	0.31%	1,438	16.47%	8,727
Tom Green	23,847	72.46%	8,981	27.29%	82	0.25%	14,866	45.17%	32,910
Travis	124,944	56.84%	94,124	42.82%	745	0.34%	30,820	14.02%	219,813
Trinity	2,599	54.89%	2,115	44.67%	21	0.44%	484	10.22%	4,735
Tyler	3,638	53.62%	3,119	45.97%	28	0.41%	519	7.65%	6,785
Upshur	7,325	61.16%	4,614	38.53%	37	0.31%	2,711	22.63%	11,976
Upton	1,603	80.39%	380	19.06%	11	0.55%	1,223	61.33%	1,994
Uvalde	4,790	65.73%	2,482	34.06%	15	0.21%	2,308	31.67%	7,287
Val Verde	5,909	60.38%	3,857	39.41%	21	0.21%	2,052	20.97%	9,787
Van Zandt	8,474	65.17%	4,506	34.65%	23	0.18%	3,968	30.52%	13,003
Victoria	18,787	72.41%	7,037	27.12%	121	0.47%	11,750	45.29%	25,945
Walker	8,809	67.24%	4,263	32.54%	28	0.21%	4,546	34.70%	13,100
Waller	4,116	51.69%	3,828	48.07%	19	0.24%	288	3.62%	7,963
Ward	3,474	74.03%	1,188	25.31%	31	0.66%	2,286	48.72%	4,693
Washington	6,506	72.32%	2,483	27.60%	7	0.08%	4,023	44.72%	8,996
Webb	8,582	40.99%	12,308	58.79%	46	0.22%	-3,726	-17.80%	20,936
Wharton	8,495	62.54%	5,072	37.34%	17	0.13%	3,423	25.20%	13,584
Wheeler	2,251	73.51%	805	26.29%	6	0.20%	1,446	47.22%	3,062
Wichita	28,932	64.18%	16,009	35.51%	139	0.31%	12,923	28.67%	45,080
Wilbarger	3,644	64.23%	2,011	35.45%	18	0.32%	1,633	28.78%	5,673
Willacy	2,340	43.41%	3,037	56.33%	14	0.26%	-697	-12.92%	5,391
Williamson	25,774	72.03%	9,911	27.70%	99	0.28%	15,863	44.33%	35,784
Wilson	4,588	61.72%	2,829	38.05%	17	0.23%	1,759	23.67%	7,434
Winkler	2,213	74.41%	752	25.29%	9	0.30%	1,461	49.12%	2,974
Wise	6,958	64.11%	3,856	35.53%	39	0.36%	3,102	28.58%	10,853
Wood	7,144	67.32%	3,449	32.50%	19	0.18%	3,695	34.82%	10,612
Yoakum	2,204	82.61%	456	17.09%	8	0.30%	1,748	65.52%	2,668
Young	5,282	70.40%	2,203	29.36%	18	0.24%	3,079	41.04%	7,503
Zapata	1,214	43.34%	1,577	56.30%	10	0.36%	-363	-12.96%	2,801
Zavala	924	23.89%	2,937	75.93%	7	0.18%	-2,013	-52.04%	3,868
Totals	3,433,428	63.61%	1,949,276	36.11%	14,867	0.28%	1,484,152	27.50%	5,397,571

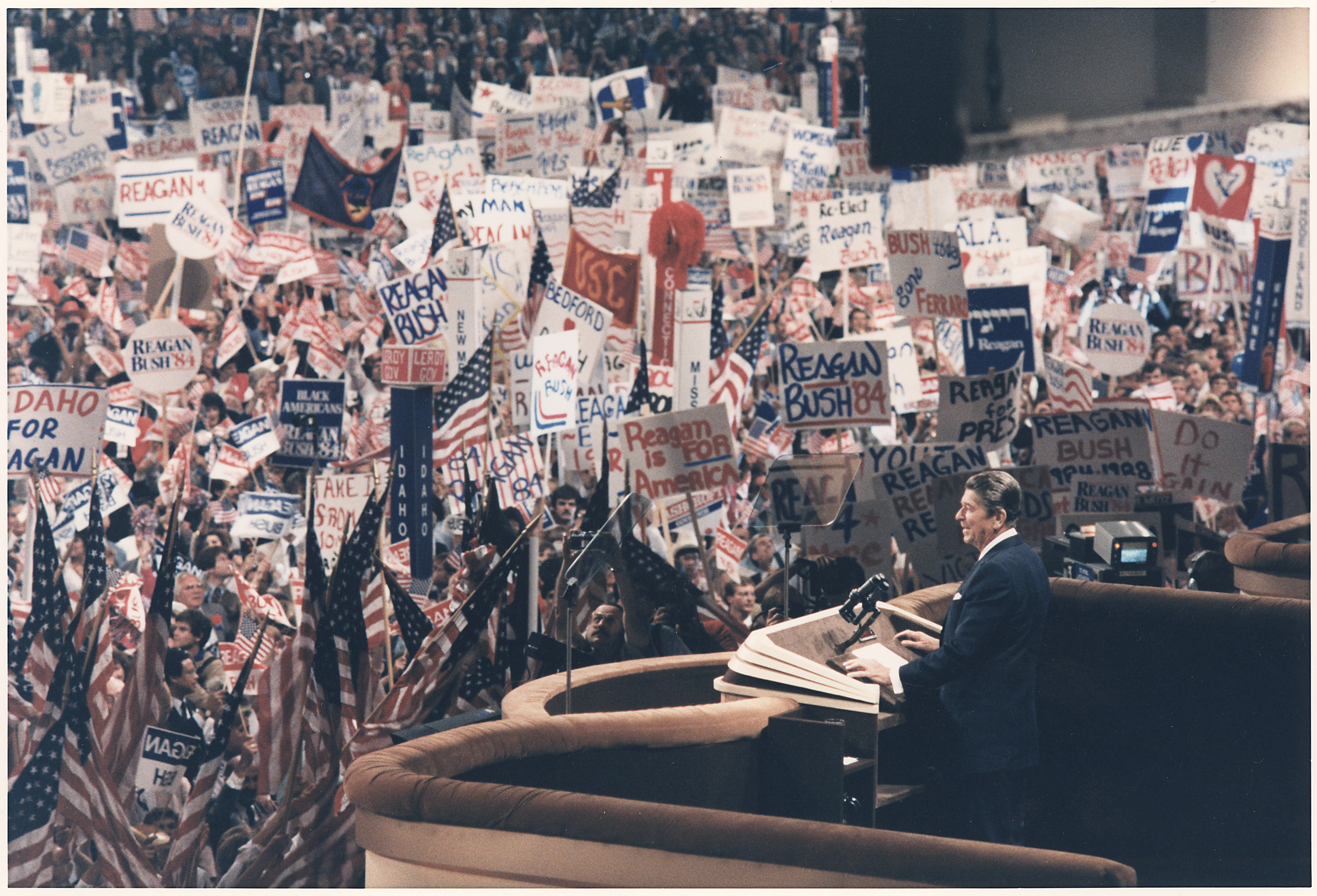
Reagan delivering his acceptance speech at the 1984 Republican National Convention in Dallas, Texas.

==== Counties that flipped from Democratic to Republican ====
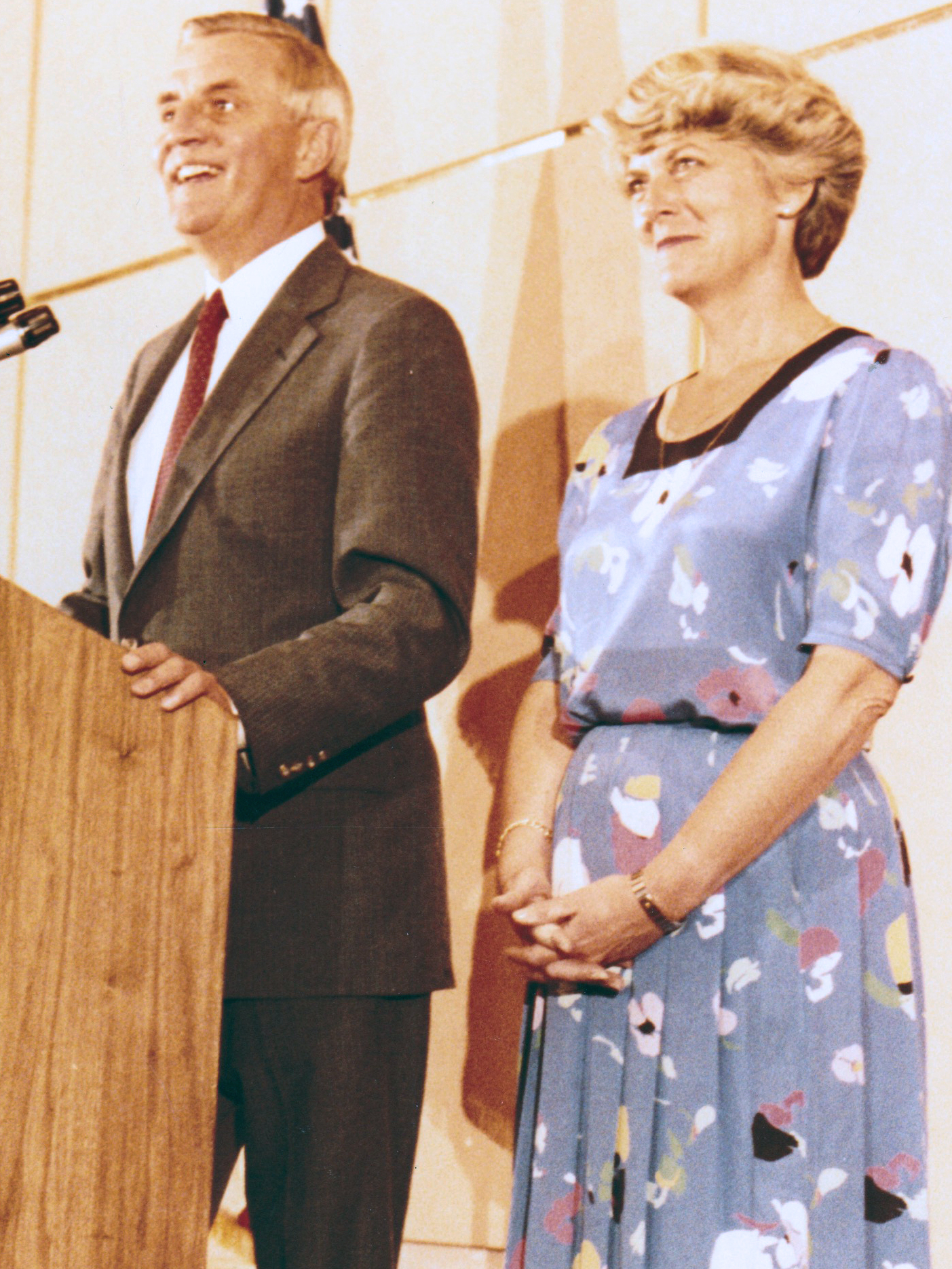
The Democratic ticket of Walter Mondale and Geraldine Ferraro campaigns in Austin, Texas

- Angelina
- Bastrop
- Baylor
- Burleson
- Caldwell
- Cameron
- Camp
- Cass
- Cherokee
- Clay
- Coke
- Comanche
- Concho
- Crosby
- Delta
- Erath
- Falls
- Fannin
- Foard
- Franklin
- Freestone
- Galveston
- Grimes
- Hardeman
- Hardin
- Haskell
- Henderson
- Hill
- Hopkins
- Houston
- Jasper
- Jones
- Kaufman
- Kent
- Kleberg
- Knox
- Lamar
- Leon
- Liberty
- Limestone
- McCulloch
- Madison
- Marion
- Milam
- Mills
- Montague
- Navarro
- Nolan
- Nueces
- Palo Pinto
- Polk
- Rains
- Red River
- Refugio
- Sabine
- San Augustine
- San Jacinto
- San Patricio
- San Saba
- Shelby
- Somervell
- Throckmorton
- Titus
- Travis
- Trinity
- Tyler
- Upshur
- Van Zandt
- Waller
- Wise

=== By congressional district ===
Reagan won 23 of 27 congressional districts, including 13 held by Democrats.

District	Reagan	Mondale	Representative
1st	62%	38%	Sam B. Hall Jr.
2nd	59%	41%	Charles Wilson
3rd	82%	18%	Steve Bartlett
4th	69%	31%	Ralph Hall
5th	59%	41%	John Bryant
6th	70%	30%	Joe Barton
7th	83%	17%	Bill Archer
8th	60%	40%	Jack Fields
9th	53%	47%	Jack Brooks
10th	58%	42%	J. J. Pickle
11th	66%	34%	Marvin Leath
12th	58%	42%	Jim Wright
13th	72%	28%	Beau Boulter
14th	68%	33%	Mac Sweeney
15th	46%	54%	Kika de la Garza
16th	57%	43%	Ron Coleman
17th	68%	32%	Charles Stenholm
18th	28%	72%	Mickey Leland
19th	75%	25%	Larry Combest
20th	41%	59%	Henry B. González
21st	78%	22%	Tom Loeffler
22nd	70%	30%	Tom DeLay
23rd	59%	41%	Albert Bustamante
24th	53%	47%	Martin Frost
25th	53%	47%	Michael A. Andrews
26th	77%	23%	Dick Armey
27th	47%	53%	Solomon Ortiz

== See also ==
- United States presidential elections in Texas
- Presidency of Ronald Reagan

== Works cited ==
- Black, Earl; Black, Merle (1992). The Vital South: How Presidents Are Elected. Harvard University Press. ISBN 0674941306.
