= Bill Allcorn =

American politician

Bill Allcorn (died August 24, 1962) was an American politician. He was Texas Land Commissioner in the late 1950s.

Allcorn was from Brownwood, Texas. In February 1958, Governor Price Daniel appointed Allcorn as Texas Land Commissioner when James Earl Rudder was appointed vice president of Texas A&M University. Allcorn was elected to one two-year term in 1958 and was succeeded by Jerry Sadler in 1961. Allcorn died on August 24, 1962, at the age of 38.

Party political offices
Preceded by James Earl Rudder	Democratic nominee for Land Commissioner of Texas; 1958	Succeeded by Jerry Sadler
Political offices
Preceded by James Earl Rudder	Commissioner of the Texas General Land Office; 1958–1961	Succeeded by Jerry Sadler
