= Crowell Independent School District =

School district in Texas

Crowell Independent School District is a public school district based in Crowell, Texas (USA).

The district serves all of Foard County, and extends into small portions of King and Knox counties.

Crowell ISD has one campus, and it serves grades PK-12th.

In 2015, the school district was rated "academically acceptable" by the Texas Education Agency.
