= Bob Armstrong (politician) =

American politician (1932–2015)

24th Land Commissioner of Texas
- In office January 12, 1971 – January 4, 1983
- Governor: Preston Smith (1971–1973); Dolph Briscoe (1973–1979); Bill Clements (1979–1983)
- Preceded by: Jerry Sadler
- Succeeded by: Garry Mauro

Member of the Texas House of Representatives from the 82nd district
- In office November 23, 1963 – January 12, 1971
- Preceded by: Jack Ritter
- Succeeded by: John Whitmire

Personal details
- Born: Robert Landis Armstrong; November 7, 1932 Austin, Texas, U.S.
- Died: March 1, 2015 (aged 82) Austin, Texas, U.S.
- Resting place: Texas State Cemetery
- Party: Democratic
- Spouse: Linda Lee Aaker Armstrong
- Education: University of Texas at Austin (BA, LLB)

Military service
- Allegiance: United States of America
- Branch/service: United States Navy
- Years of service: 1950–1953
- Rank: Ensign
- Battles/wars: Korean War

Robert Landis Armstrong (November 7, 1932 – March 1, 2015) was an American Democratic politician and an environmental activist from the state of Texas. He was a member of the Texas House of Representatives from 1963 to 1971, Commissioner of the Texas General Land Office from 1971 to 1983, and a member of the Texas Parks and Wildlife Commission from 1985 to 1991. From 1993 to 1998, he was the assistant secretary for land and minerals management at the United States Department of the Interior under appointment of U.S. President Bill Clinton.

== Early years ==
Bob Armstrong was the son of the late Robert C. Armstrong and the former Louise Landis. He married the former Linda Lee Aaker, a lobbyist also from Austin.

He received his Bachelor of Arts from the University of Texas and his LL.B. from the University of Texas School of Law, both in his native Austin. While at UT, Armstrong was a member of the service organization known as the Texas Cowboys. He served during the Korean War as an ensign in the United States Navy.

== Political career ==
In 1970, Armstrong was elected the Commissioner of the General Land Office to succeed long-term incumbent Jerry Sadler. He was Land Commissioner for twelve years until 1983. While Land Commissioner he became interested in acquiring the Big Bend Ranch for the State. He was finally able to achieve this in 1988 as a member of the Texas Parks and Wildlife Commission, leading to the creation of Big Bend Ranch State Park.

Armstrong ran for Governor in 1982, losing in the Democratic primary to eventual winner Mark White. In 1985, Governor White appointed Armstrong to the Texas Parks and Wildlife Commission.

President Clinton appointed Armstrong to serve as Assistant Secretary of the Interior for Land and Minerals Management.

== Bob Armstrong dip ==
Armstrong holds a distinction in that he has a dip named after him. Matt's El Rancho restaurant in Austin named a concoction of queso, guacamole, taco meat, and other ingredients "Bob Armstrong dip."
On June 28, 2019, El Rancho filed a lawsuit against Horseshoe Hill Cafe, (headquartered in Fort Worth, Texas) citing trademark infringement ~ when Hill Cafe put Bob Armstrong dip on their menu.

Party political offices
Preceded by Jerry Sadler	Democratic nominee for Land Commissioner of Texas; 1970, 1972, 1974, 1978	Succeeded by Garry Mauro
Political offices
Texas House of Representatives
Preceded by Jack Ritter	Member of the Texas House of Representatives from District 82 (Austin); 1963–1971	Succeeded by John Whitmire (redistricted)
Preceded by Jerry Sadler	Commissioner of the Texas General Land Office; 1971–1983	Succeeded by Garry Mauro
Preceded by David C. O'Neal	Assistant Secretary of the Interior for Land and Minerals Management; 1993–1998	Succeeded by Sylvia Baca
