= Crowell, Texas =

- City
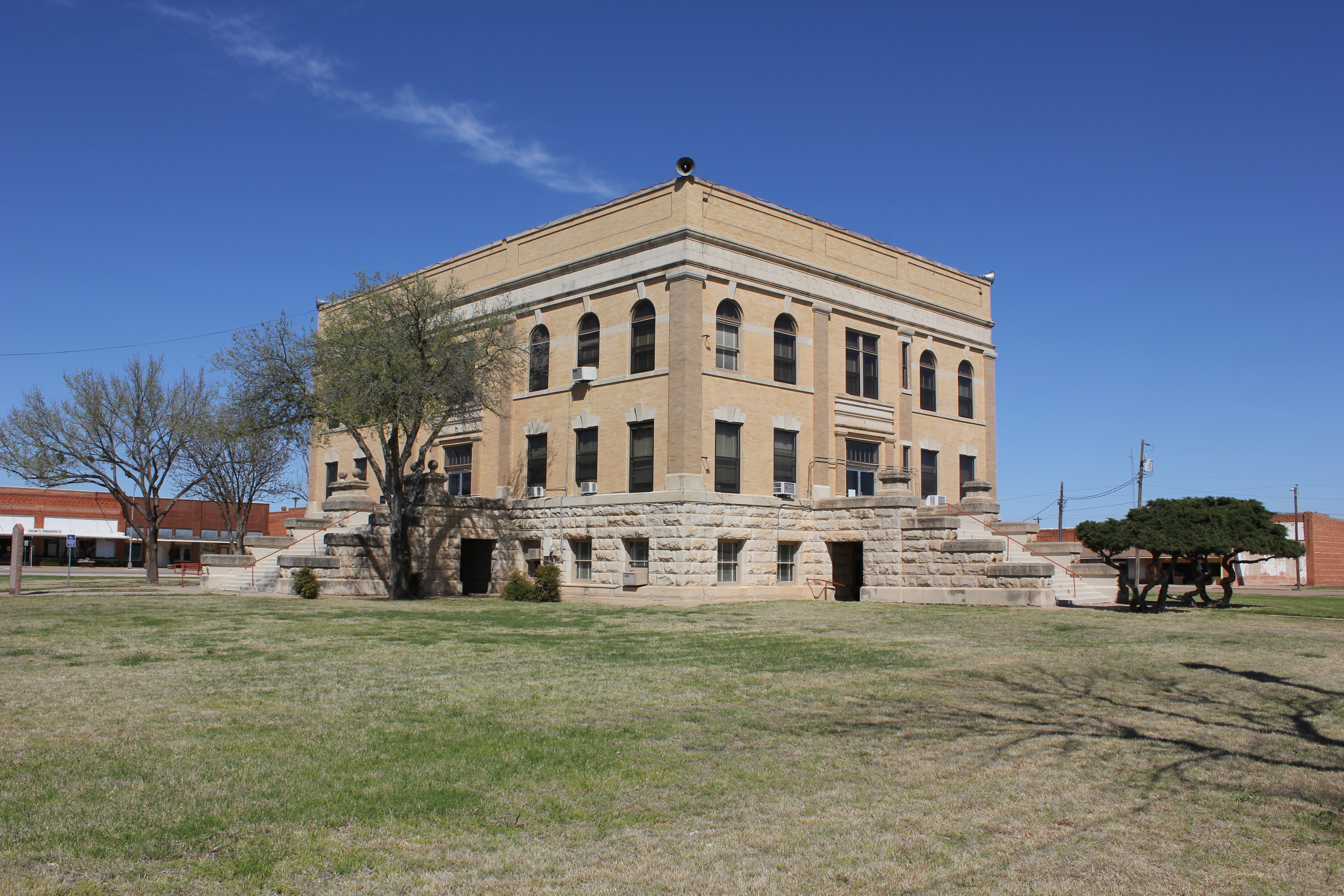
- Foard County Courthouse

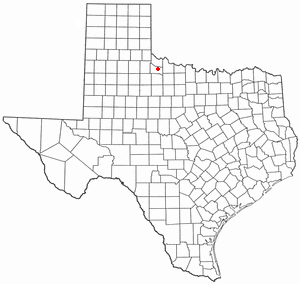
- Location of Crowell, Texas

- Coordinates: 33°59′02″N 99°43′27″W
- Country: United States
- State: Texas
- County: Foard

Area
  - Total: 1.89 sq mi (4.89 km^{2})
  - Land: 1.88 sq mi (4.88 km^{2})
  - Water: 0 sq mi (0.00 km^{2})
- Elevation: 1,476 ft (450 m)

Population (2020)
  - Total: 769
  - Density: 408/sq mi (158/km^{2})
- Time zone: UTC-6 (Central (CST))
  - Summer (DST): UTC-5 (CDT)
- ZIP code: 79227
- Area code: 940
- FIPS code: 48-17948
- GNIS feature ID: 2410269
- Website: cityofcrowell.org

Crowell (/ˈkroʊəl/ KROH-əl) is a city and the county seat of Foard County, Texas, United States. The population was 769 at the 2020 census, down from 948 at the 2010 census.

== Geography ==
Crowell is located near the center of Foard County and U.S. Route 70 passes through the city as Commerce Street, leading east 33 miles (53 km) to Vernon and west 36 miles (58 km) to Paducah. Texas State Highway 6 (Main Street) crosses US 70 in the center of Crowell, leading north 22 miles (35 km) to Quanah and south 28 miles (45 km) to Benjamin. Wichita Falls is 81 miles (130 km) to the east via US 70 and US 287.

According to the United States Census Bureau, Crowell has a total area of 1.9 sq mi (4.9 km^{2}), all of it land.

=== Climate ===
According to the Köppen climate classification, Crowell has a semiarid climate, BSk on climate maps.

== Demographics ==
Historical population
Census	Pop.	Note	%±
1910	1,341		—
1920	1,175		−12.4%
1930	1,946		65.6%
1940	1,817		−6.6%
1950	1,912		5.2%
1960	1,703		−10.9%
1970	1,399		−17.9%
1980	1,509		7.9%
1990	1,230		−18.5%
2000	1,141		−7.2%
2010	948		−16.9%
2020	769		−18.9%
U.S. Decennial Census

=== 2020 census ===
As of the 2020 census, there were 769 people, 334 households, and 169 families residing in the city. The median age was 50.7 years, with 17.7% of residents under the age of 18 and 30.2% of residents aged 65 or older. For every 100 females there were 84.9 males, and for every 100 females age 18 and over there were 84.0 males age 18 and over.

Of the 334 households in Crowell, 29.0% had children under the age of 18 living in them. Of all households, 40.7% were married-couple households, 19.2% were households with a male householder and no spouse or partner present, and 31.7% were households with a female householder and no spouse or partner present. About 32.1% of all households were made up of individuals and 17.1% had someone living alone who was 65 years of age or older.

There were 394 housing units, of which 15.2% were vacant. The homeowner vacancy rate was 2.1% and the rental vacancy rate was 7.9%.

0.0% of residents lived in urban areas, while 100.0% lived in rural areas.

Racial composition as of the 2020 census
Race	Number	Percent
White	642	83.5%
Black or African American	12	1.6%
American Indian and Alaska Native	0	0.0%
Asian	4	0.5%
Native Hawaiian and Other Pacific Islander	1	0.1%
Some other race	64	8.3%
Two or more races	46	6.0%
Hispanic or Latino (of any race)	160	20.8%

=== 2000 census ===
As of the census of 2000, 1,141 people, 465 households, and 292 families were residing in the city. The population density was 604.6 people/sq mi (233.1/km^{2}). The 568 housing units averaged 301.0/sq mi (116.0/km^{2}). The racial makeup of the city was 83.26% White, 3.07% African American, 0.70% Native American, 11.13% from other races, and 1.84% from two or more races. Hispanics or Latinos of any race were 17.62% of the population.

Of the 465 households, 29.7% had children under 18 living with them, 50.3% were married couples living together, 10.3% had a female householder with no husband present, and 37.0% were not families. About 34.4% of all households were made up of individuals, and 21.7% had someone living alone who was 65 or older. The average household size was 2.36, and the average family size was 3.08.

In the city, the age distribution was 26.8% under 18, 5.9% from 18 to 24, 21.9% from 25 to 44, 22.3% from 45 to 64, and 23.0% who were 65 or older. The median age was 40 years. For every 100 females, there were 82.9 males. For every 100 females age 18 and over, there were 79.6 males.

The median income for a household in the city was $22,214, and for a family was $30,667. Males had a median income of $21,141 versus $16,184 for females. The per capita income for the city was $12,965. About 11.4% of families and 16.4% of the population were below the poverty line, including 17.1% of those under age 18 and 19.6% of those age 65 or over.

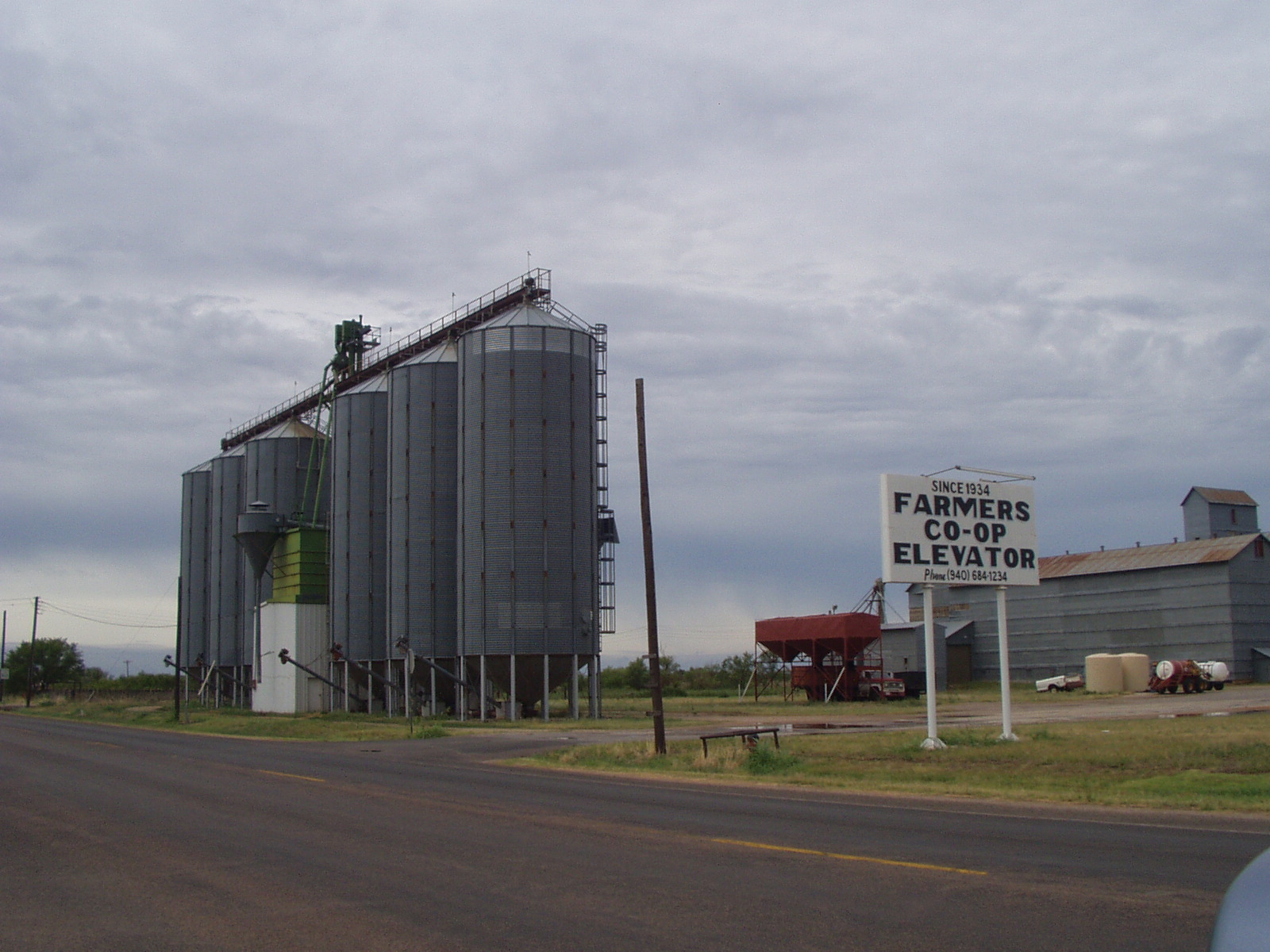
Historic cooperative elevator in Crowell

== Economy ==
The economy is almost solely agrarian. Beef cattle, wheat, and cotton are the primary sources of income and employment.Hunting leases are quickly becoming a notable contributor to the local economy. The single manufacturing industry is a cap factory. Formerly owned by the DeLong company, the factory is now owned by a group of local investors.

== Arts and culture ==
A museum located in the former firehouse features artifacts from the history of Crowell. There is also a Farm Hall Museum.

== Education ==
The city is served by the Crowell Independent School District. Schools include Crowell High School.

== Notable people ==
- Dick Todd - football player.
