= Jerry Sadler =

American politician (1907–1982)

Gerald Anthony Sadler
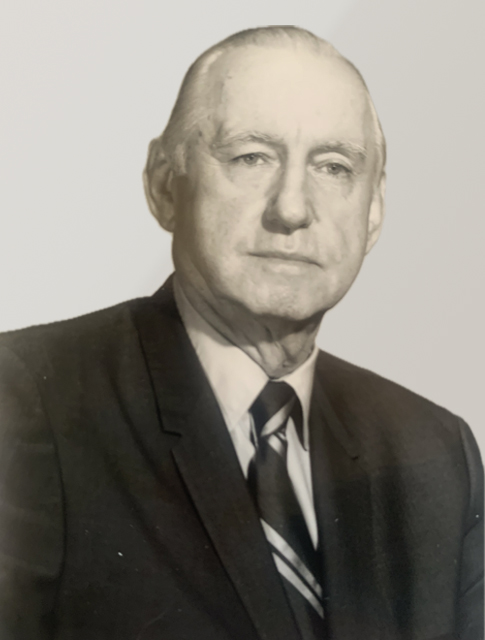
- Sadler, c. 1966

23rd Land Commissioner of Texas
- In office January 1, 1961 – January 1, 1971
- Governor: Price Daniel; John Connally; Preston Smith
- Preceded by: Bill Alcorn
- Succeeded by: Bob Armstrong

Member of the Texas House of Representatives from the 27th district
- In office January 11, 1955 – January 10, 1961
- Preceded by: James Paxton
- Succeeded by: Rayford Price

Railroad Commissioner of Texas
- In office January 1, 1939 – January 1, 1943
- Governor: James V. Allred; W. Lee O'Daniel
- Preceded by: Charles Vernon Terrell
- Succeeded by: Beauford H. Jester

Personal details
- Born: September 8, 1907 Kirbyville, Texas, U.S.
- Died: February 25, 1982 (aged 74)
- Resting place: Texas State Cemetery
- Party: Democratic
- Spouse: Laura Jones Sadler (m. 1942)

Military service
- Allegiance: United States
- Branch/service: United States Army
- Years of service: 1927–1929; 1942
- Rank: Lieutenant colonel
- Battles/wars: World War II

Gerald Anthony Sadler (September 8, 1907 – February 25, 1982) was a Democratic politician from the U.S. state of Texas. He was a member of the Texas House of Representatives from 1955 to 1961, the Texas Railroad Commission from 1939 to 1943, and the Commissioner of the General Land Office from 1961 to 1971.

== Early years ==
Sadler was born to Maybelle and Claude Sadler in Kirbyville, near Palestine, in Anderson County, Texas. His great-grandfather William Turner Sadler, fought at the Battle of San Jacinto and served in the House of Representatives of the Ninth Congress of the Republic of Texas and, after annexation to the U.S., was reelected to the First and Second state legislatures.

Frequently in trouble in school and at home, Sadler left Kirbyville for Houston at age 14. He landed a job there as the youngest bellboy at the Rice Hotel. He attended Stephen F. Austin College and Jefferson University, from which he received a law degree.

According to his autobiography, Politics, Fat Cats and Honey-Money Boys: The Mem-Wars of Jerry Sadler, he then worked briefly as a youth minister in Port Arthur, as an undercover FBI agent in the Valley, and became the state's youngest millionaire in the East Texas oilfields. In the book, he also claims to have practiced law in Longview after a short period of study with Clarence Darrow in Chicago.

He served in the United States Army 12th Cavalry from 1927 to 1929 at Fort Brown in Brownsville in Cameron County, Texas.

== Railroad Commissioner ==
In 1938, Sadler was elected to head the Texas Railroad Commission. Despite its name, the agency regulates the state's oil and natural gas industry, gas utilities and infrastructure, the liquefied petroleum gas industry, and surface coal and uranium mining. He had run on the notion that big business and oil companies were exploiting the common people of Texas. During the depression, oil was the lifeblood of the state. Sadler felt that wealth should belong Texans, not "the fat cats of Wall Street."

At only 30 years of age, he was the youngest to hold the office. Sadler claimed he had been in 58 fistfights during the campaign. The big oil companies sent hired hecklers and provocateurs to harass him at every campaign stop, trying to goad him into a fight. They were frequently successful. Sadler would leave the podium and engage in a scuffle right in front of the crowd.

Fifteen months into his term, he made a gubernatorial run against W. Lee "Pappy" O'Daniel. He launched the ultimately unsuccessful campaign with a "hillbilly band" and his cousin/campaign manager, the well-known tent entertainer Harley Sadler, serving as emcee.

== Wartime service ==
Although he was exempt from further military service, Sadler resigned the Railroad Commission in 1942 to re-enlist in the U.S. Army. He was entitled to enlist as a commissioned officer. He joined as a private. During World War II, he was stationed in Iran where he oversaw supply lines to the Soviet Union. He was awarded the European-African Middle Eastern Theater Ribbon and, from the USSR, the Order of the Fatherland, Second Class in 1944. He was honorably discharged in 1945 with the rank of Lieutenant Colonel.

After the war, Sadler returned to Anderson County. In the 1946 gubernatorial election, Sadler ran for the Democratic nomination, but was defeated by his successor on the Railroad Commission, Beauford H. Jester of Corsicana in Navarro County. He then was elected to the Texas House in 1954 (term 1/11/1955 - 1/8/1957). He was twice re-elected, serving to January 10, 1961.

== Texas House of Representatives ==
Sadler was a member of the Conservation and Reclamation Committee and the Education Committee for all three of his terms in the Texas House, and served on the Oil, Gas and Mining Committee during the 54th and 55th sessions. He acted as vice chair of the Military and Veteran's Affairs Committee in the 55th session and vice chair of the Commerce and Manufacturers Committee in the 56th.

In spring 1957, Sadler was apprised by an employee of the University of Texas at Austin that a young black woman, Barbara Smith Conrad, had been cast to sing the role of Dido (opposite a white Aeneas) in Henry Purcell's "Dido and Aeneas" at UT Austin. At a legislator's breakfast, Sadler complained of the mixed-race casting, prompting another legislator, Joe Chapman, to telephone the president of the University, Logan Wilson, and threaten to withhold funding should Smith perform.

Wilson had her removed from the cast, provoking protests and national news coverage. When interviewed by the Houston Post, Sadler said of his breakfast remarks, "I mentioned appropriations and as a matter of fact [I] voted against those for the university because they have Negro undergraduates." Smith graduated UT in 1959 and later gained international renown as an operatic star.

== Land Commissioner ==
Following his six-year stint as a state representative, Sadler won the 1960 race for Texas Land Commissioner. He would become best recognized for his decade in this role.

Upon his arrival at the General Land Office (GLO), Sadler directed female employees to wear longer skirts and male employees to sport shorter sideburns. He believed the fashion of the times was "a sign of moral decay." He also discontinued the practice of allowing staff to have coffee breaks away from their desks, believing them a burden on taxpayers.

Sadler called the GLO "the biggest real estate agency in the world." During his term, the land office controlled 22 million acres of land and the associated mineral deposits. Under Sadler's leadership, the size of the Permanent School Fund doubled. Royalties on mineral rights grew from one-eighth to one-sixth. Land loans to veterans reached an all time high. (Thirty-five percent of all loans made to veterans during the first thirty years of the Veterans Land Board were due to Sadler.) His keen interest in the Texas Coast and submerged lands led to creation of the Coastal Division. In 1963, he was the first land commissioner to employ aerial photography for surveying.

In 1962, Sadler opposed Senator Ralph Yarborough's plans to create a National Seashore at South Padre Island. Sadler claimed that a National Seashore that took over state-owned tidelands would prohibit the removal of oil and natural gas and thus deprive Texas of millions of dollars in revenues that would otherwise contribute to the school fund. Using fervent language such as "summarily stripped of such great wealth," Sadler convinced Governor Price Daniel, Sr., to appoint a statewide committee to study the feasibility of a state park in place of the National Seashore.

Ultimately, the Padre Island National Seashore was designated. Ironically, Padre Island would provide the setting for the final phase of Sadler's tenure as Land Commissioner.

=== Jerry the Pirate ===
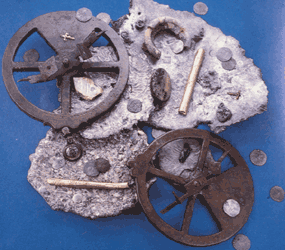
Astrolabes, coins, and other objects recovered from the Padre Island shipwrecks of April, 1554

In 1968, Sadler became involved with Platoro Ltd. of Indiana, which discovered the wrecks of three 16th century Spanish galleons while dredging along the Gulf Coast near South Padre Island. In the fall of 1967, Platoro began excavation of the shipwreck, Espiritu Santo. The company salvaged some 500 items including gold bars, gold jewelry, silver bullion and early navigational equipment. Platoro initially kept the treasures, which were removed to Indiana.

When Sadler heard of the operation he protested that the artifacts belonged to the State of Texas and claimed the treasure trove for the Permanent School Fund. He believed existing statutes granted the Land Commissioner authority to oversee all state-owned land, including submerged lands, and to supervise all operations involving them.

Sadler's handling of the treasure earned him the nickname "Jerry the Pirate" from state legislators who questioned his authority. His combative actions, including skirmishes with a reporter and dissenting colleagues only enhanced this perception. In 1969, State Representative Jake Johnson of San Antonio held a press conference demanding the return of the Spanish treasure. At the conference, Sadler ended up holding Johnson in a choke hold as a radio reporter stuck a microphone in his face and asked him for comment. "The land commissioner is choking me," Johnson replied.

Sadler sent trucks accompanied by armed guards to reclaim the "stolen" loot from Indiana. To facilitate the retrieval, Sadler signed an agreement with Platoro stating that Texas and the company would split the treasure equally. Sadler later claimed this act was to keep Platoro from filing a maritime lawsuit, which would have prevented the state from getting "so much as a seashell" from the wreck. The contract would later prove a source of conflict with the legislature.

When the treasure returned to Austin, Sadler had the artifacts locked in the GLO's vault. Once the goods were safely stored, Sadler persuaded Texas Attorney General Crawford Martin to take legal action to protect them. The court banned Platoro from further salvage operations, beginning a legal battle in federal court that continued into the early 1980s. The suit was rife with controversy and confusion over the rights of the state, the rights of private firms and the land commissioner's jurisdiction.

=== The Antiquities Act and the end of an era ===
As a result of the suit, the legislature passed the Antiquities Act, a bill that established a seven-member Antiquities Committee, which was given control of the shipwreck. Sadler still refused to give up possession of the artifacts. Despite his protest, the treasure became the committee's property and was transferred to the University of Texas for further research.

The act additionally gave the committee jurisdiction over discovery and salvage operations at designated sites, as well as the responsibility to preserve and protect archeological resources. It declared that any offshore shipwrecks of pre-twentieth-century origin found in the Gulf of Mexico or in the riverbeds owned by the state automatically became state archeological landmarks and therefore the property of the state.

It is thought Sadler's career-ending move was his authorship and mass printing of a booklet, Treasure Tempest in Texas, that detailed the shipwreck story and his own heroic efforts to preserve the artifacts. This might not have caused an outcry had Sadler not charged the printing costs to the state.

In 1970, State Representative Bob Armstrong of Austin defeated Sadler in the Democratic primary and went on to hold the position of Land Commissioner for twelve years. Sadler never returned to political office, despite one more attempt at Land Commissioner in 1982 and three more attempts at Railroad Commissioner in 1976, 1978 and 1980.

== Personal life ==
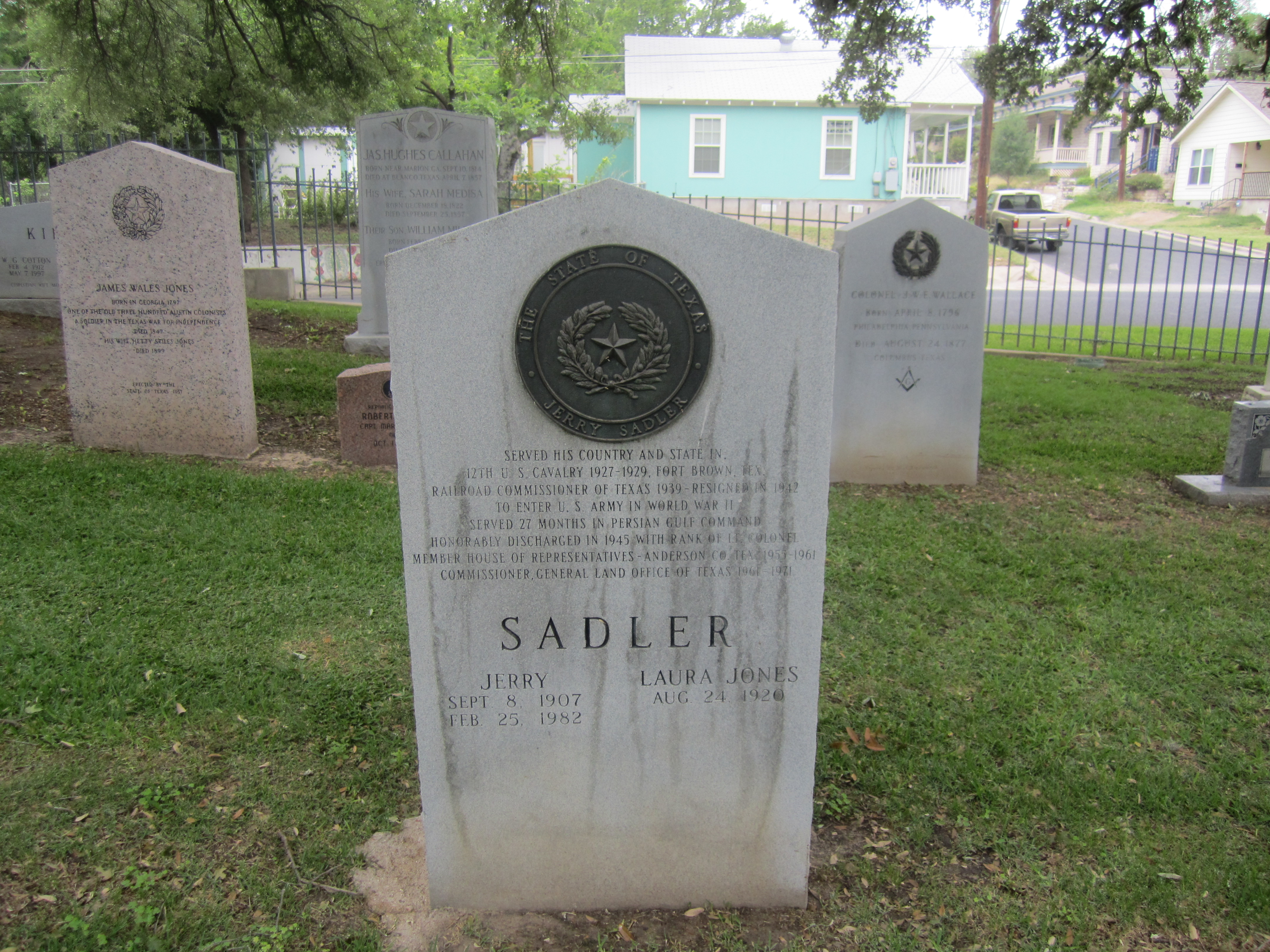
Jerry Sadler monument at Texas State Cemetery in Austin, Texas

Sadler was well-known for his snuff habit and sourdough bread recipe.

Sadler's first wife was Margarette Butts; the couple divorced in 1941. He wed second wife Laura Jones (born August 24, 1920) in 1942. The couple had two sons.

In addition to his political career, Sadler found time for several businesses, including the Sadler Motor Hotel, which opened in Palestine, Texas, in 1962, and a catfish farm that started up in Hickory Grove, Texas, in 1967. In later years, he retired to his farm in Anderson County and helped the local Slocum Independent School District by managing the construction of several new buildings.

Sadler died on February 25, 1982, at the age of 74. He is interred at Texas State Cemetery in Austin.

Party political offices
Preceded by Bill Allcorn	Democratic nominee for Land Commissioner of Texas; 1960, 1962, 1964, 1966, 1968	Succeeded by Bob Armstrong
Political offices
Preceded by Charles Vernon Terrell	Texas Railroad Commissioner; 1939-1942	Succeeded by Beauford H. Jester
Texas House of Representatives
Preceded by James Paxton	Member of the Texas House of Representatives from District 27 (Palestine); 1955–1961	Succeeded by Rayford Price
Preceded by Bill Alcorn	Commissioner of the Texas General Land Office; 1961–1971	Succeeded by Bob Armstrong
