= Sara Ehrman =

American politician (1919 - 2017)

- Ehrman in 2016
- Born: Sara Teitelbaum; April 24, 1919; Staten Island, New York, U.S.
- Died: June 3, 2017 (aged 98); Washington D.C.
- Occupations: Jewish activist, Democratic Party adviser on Israel-Palestine conflict
- Political party: Democratic Party
- Spouse: Libert Ehrman (m. 1940; div. 1969)
- Children: 2

Sara Ehrman (April 24, 1919 – June 3, 2017) was an American politician who advocated for a two-state solution to the Israel-Palestine conflict. Ehrman served as a senior advisor to the S. Daniel Abraham Center for Middle East Peace.

== Biography ==
Sara Teitelbaum (later Ehrman) was born in Staten Island, N.Y. She was active in Zionist groups in her youth, although her father disapproved. Her mother died when she was nine, and she was sent to live with an aunt and 11 cousins.

She married Libert Ehrman in 1940 and they had two children but ultimately divorced. she died of endocarditis in Washington DC in June 2017 at age 98.

== Political career ==
In 1965, Ehrman became a Capitol Hill legislative assistant working for Senator Joseph S. Clark, a Democrat from Pennsylvania, on Capitol Hill. In 1972 she served as deputy director of issues and research George McGovern's presidential campaign, where she met Hillary Clinton, then a young lawyer. Clinton became Erhman's tenant in Washington D.C. in the 1970s, while Ehrman worked for the office of the governor of Puerto Rico. Ehrman was later involved with Bill Clinton's presidential campaign, serving as director of Jewish outreach. She then became deputy political director of the Democratic National Committee.

She was active in Israeli issues. She was a founding member of Americans for Peace Now, a member of the American Israel Public Affairs Committee (AIPAC), and an advisor to the S. Daniel Abraham Center for Middle East Peace.
