= Sylvia Baca =

American government official

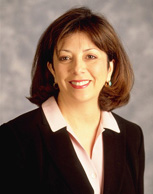

Deputy Assistant Secretary for Land and Minerals Management
- Incumbent
- Assumed office June 18, 2009
- President: Barack Obama

Personal details
- Born: United States
- Party: Democratic
- Education: University of New Mexico

Sylvia V. Baca is an American government official. She was appointed by Secretary of the Interior Ken Salazar to the position of Deputy Assistant Secretary for Land and Minerals Management on June 18, 2009. Baca, a former employee of BP Oil, was the general manager for Social Investment Programs and Strategic Partnerships at BP America, Inc. As part of her duties at the United States Department of the Interior she oversees the Bureau of Land Management and the Office of Surface Mining Reclamation and Enforcement.

Baca has a master's degree in Public Administration and Finance from the University of New Mexico.

== See also ==
- Elizabeth Birnbaum
