= 1998 Texas gubernatorial election =

- November 3, 1998
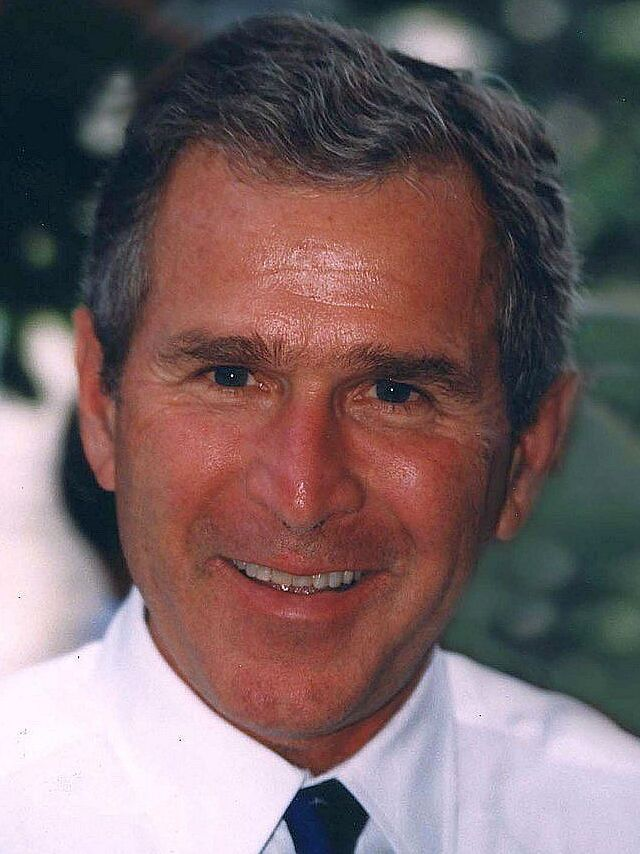

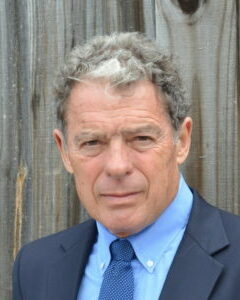
Nominee	George W. Bush	Garry Mauro
Party	Republican	Democratic
Popular vote	2,550,821	1,165,592
Percentage	68.24%	31.18%
- County results Bush: 50–60% 60–70% 70–80% 80–90% >90% Mauro: 40–50% 50–60% 60–70% 70–80%
Governor before election
George W. Bush
Republican
Elected Governor
George W. Bush
Republican

The 1998 Texas gubernatorial election was held on November 3, 1998, to elect the governor of Texas. Republican incumbent George W. Bush was re-elected in a landslide over Democratic Texas Land Commissioner Garry Mauro, with 68 percent of the vote. The landslide victory established Bush as the early front-runner for the 2000 Republican Party presidential nomination, which he ultimately won before winning the 2000 presidential election.

Bush carried 239 counties, while Mauro carried just 15. Exit polls revealed that Bush won 27 percent of the African American vote, the highest percentage for any Republican statewide candidate in the country, and 49 percent of the Latino vote. This was the first election in which Republicans won consecutive gubernatorial elections in the state. Bush's 37-point margin of victory was the largest won by any candidate since 1964 and is, to date, the largest ever won by a Republican candidate. As of 2026, this is the most recent gubernatorial election in which El Paso, Hidalgo, Willacy, or Travis counties voted for the Republican candidate, with Travis giving Bush over 60 percent of its vote, a rarity for Republicans in that county given its status as a liberal stronghold. (Note: Despite El Paso going for Bush in this election, they would fail to back him in either of his presidential campaigns in 2000 and 2004. Travis County gave Bush a plurality in 2000 before reverting to Democratic hands in 2004.)

Bush was sworn in for a second term as governor on January 19, 1999. He resigned on December 21, 2000, after his election as the 43rd president of the United States. Lieutenant governor Rick Perry served the remainder of Bush's term.

== Background ==
George W. Bush, the son of former United States president George H. W. Bush, was elected governor in 1994 by defeating Democratic incumbent Ann Richards. Upon taking office in January 1995, Bush had a low approval rating of 38 percent. However, his popularity improved significantly over the course of his first term, reaching 70 percent in February 1997. Going into the election, Bush had an approval rating of 76 percent.

== Primaries ==
=== Republican ===
Republican primary results
Party	Candidate	Votes	%
Republican	George W. Bush (incumbent)	576,528	96.60%
Republican	R. C. Crawford	20,311	3.40%
Total votes		596,839	100.00%

=== Democratic ===
Democratic primary results
Party	Candidate	Votes	%
Democratic	Garry Mauro	492,419	100.00%
Total votes		492,419	100.00%

== General election ==
=== Candidates ===
- George W. Bush, incumbent governor of Texas since 1995 (Republican)
- Garry Mauro, Texas land commissioner (Democratic)
- Susan Lee Solar (Independent)
- Lester R. Turlington Jr. (Libertarian)

=== Campaign ===
Before the campaign began, George Bush spokeswoman Karen Hughes said, "The philosophical differences between Gov. Bush and Garry Mauro are clear and stark. Gov. Bush is a conservative, as most Texans are, and Garry Mauro is a liberal."

On June 22, 1998, Mauro called Bush out of touch saying, "Governor Bush is out of touch with the concerns of ordinary citizens and in bed with the giant HMO's." This was because in 1995, Bush vetoed the Patient Protection Act, which would have forced state-regulated healthcare organizations to allow their customers to choose their own doctor. The Patient Protection Act would have also mandated that insurance companies to cover cancer treatment received at the University of Texas MD Anderson Cancer Center.

Bush and Mauro met for the sole gubernatorial election debate in El Paso on October 16, 1998. Initially, Bush seemed rather nervous and defensive. Mauro attacked Bush for his position on teachers salaries and support for a nuclear waste dump in Sierra Blanca. However, Bush was well prepared and attacked Mauro's tax and spending proposals, describing them as "overambitious". The results of the debate would have little impact on the general election in November.

=== Polling ===
Throughout the entire campaign, George W. Bush led in the polls by wide margins.

After Garry Mauro declared his candidacy in November 1997, a Scripps Howard Texas Poll of 793 registered voters showed Bush leading by 68%–16%, with 14% undecided. In mid-June 1998, a Scripps Howard Texas Poll was conducted with Bush versus Mauro. The poll showed 70% likely voters support Bush, 17% favored Mauro, 11% were undecided, and 2% would vote for neither. Bush's approval rating was also virtually unchanged polling at 75%. In response to the poll, government professor Bruce Buchanan at the University of Texas at Austin said, "Gov. Bush looks to be unbeatable, but there's enough time for anything to happen. There is a slim chance for Mauro but still a real chance for him to reach voters with ad dollars and issue choices. It's just too early to call the November election in June."

Another Scripps Howard Texas Poll was conducted from August 12 to August 27, 1998. It indicated that 77% of likely voters support Bush, 20% favored Mauro, and 1% supported Libertarian candidate Lester Turlington Jr. About 10% were undecided and 2% didn't answer. Again, Bush's approval rating barely fell and was 74% of Texans remarked that he was doing a good to excellent job as governor. Allan Saxe, an assistant political science professor at the University of Texas said, "Now he's ahead [Bush] by an awfully huge margin. If Garry Mauro can close that to a 10 to 15 percent difference by election day, it will be a symbolic victory. But it will be hard to do – a 50-point difference is a big one." Among Hispanics, Bush led Mauro 51%–31%, down from 67%–20% in June.

Poll source	Date(s)	Sample size	George W. Bush (R)	Garry Mauro (D)	Other / undecided (Note: Calculated by taking the difference of 100% and all other candidates combined.)
Harris Insights & Analytics	October 30, 1998	3,579	73%	25%	2%
Mason-Dixon Polling & Strategy	October 29, 1998	504	69%	25%	6%
Blum & Weprin Associates	October 28, 1998	967	70%	23%	7%
Hill Research Consultants (R) (Note: Poll conducted for an unspecified Republican sponsor.)	October 27, 1998	501	69%	22%	9%
Harris Insights & Analytics	October 20, 1998	3,248	73%	22%	5%

=== Results ===
General election results
Party	Candidate	Votes	%
Republican	George W. Bush (incumbent)	2,550,821	68.24%
Democratic	Garry Mauro	1,165,592	31.18%
Libertarian	Lester R. Turlington Jr.	20,711	0.47%
Independent	Susan Lee Solar	954	0.03%
Total votes		3,738,078	100.00%
Republican hold			

== Aftermath ==
Following his defeat, Garry Mauro was succeeded by David Dewhurst as the Commissioner of the General Land Office in early 1999. Mauro would later serve as the Texas State Chairman for various Democratic presidential candidates, including for Al Gore in 2000, Dick Gephardt in 2004, and Hillary Clinton in 2008. However, Mauro himself never sought political office again. Eventually, he opened a private law practice in his hometown of Austin.

George W. Bush was inaugurated for his second term as Governor of Texas on January 19, 1999. With his brother Jeb sworn-in as Governor of Florida earlier that month, George and Jeb Bush became the first two brothers to simultaneously serve as governors since Nelson and Winthrop Rockefeller from 1967 to 1971. In June 1999, Bush announced his candidacy for president in 2000. At the 2000 Republican National Convention, Bush was nominated for president, and he narrowly won the general election against Al Gore. On December 21, 2000, less than two years into his second term, George W. Bush resigned as governor and was succeeded by Rick Perry.
