= Garry Mauro =

American politician

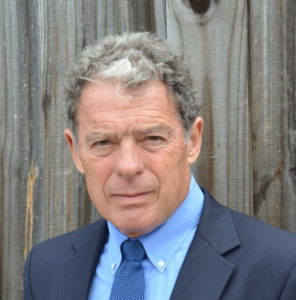
- Mauro in 2015

25th Land Commissioner of Texas
- In office January 1, 1983 – January 5, 1999
- Governor: Mark White; Bill Clements; Ann Richards; George W. Bush
- Preceded by: Bob Armstrong
- Succeeded by: David Dewhurst

Personal details
- Born: Garry Paul Mauro; February 21, 1948 (age 77); Bryan, Texas, U.S.
- Political party: Democratic
- Children: 5
- Education: Texas A&M University (BA); University of Texas, Austin (LLB)

Garry Paul Mauro (born February 21, 1948) is an American politician who served four terms as Land Commissioner of Texas from 1983 to 1999, during the administrations of Governors Mark White, Bill Clements, Ann Richards, and George W. Bush. He is also known for losing the 1998 Texas gubernatorial election to Bush, who at the time was the incumbent governor seeking re-election. He is a member of the Democratic Party.

== Life and career ==
Mauro, a native of Bryan, Texas, attended Waco, Texas Reicher Catholic High School. He attended college at Texas A&M University in College Station. He subsequently attended the University of Texas Law School.

Mauro went to work for United States Senator Ralph Yarborough after graduation from law school. He became Executive Director of the Texas Democratic Party by the time he was 30.

At 34 in 1982, he was elected to the statewide office of Texas Land Commissioner. Despite being targeted for defeat by the state Republican Party, he was re-elected three times.

Mauro became the longest-serving Land Commissioner in Texas history serving a total of 16 years in office. He is credited by many for bringing new relevance to the office and taking the lead on important issues, including many environmental and conservation initiatives.

As chairman of the Veteran's Land Board, Mauro pushed legislation passed in 1983 that expanded the investment authority of the board and provided for increased loan ceiling for land and housing. The program was expanded to include certain National Guard personnel. He moved for exceptionally low interest rates, which led to a record number of housing loans for Texas veterans. In 1993, Mauro campaigned to gain voter approval of an additional $500 million in bonds for veterans housing loans and $250 million in bonds for land loans.

In 1989, the Texas Legislature approved a Mauro initiative to reduce air pollution and to sell more natural gas. The bill requires fleet operators in larger cities to convert to clean-burning fuels, including compressed natural gas. Mauro was appointed by Speaker Jim Wright to a Task Force that put similar measures in the re-authorization of the Clean Air Act. In 1993, President Bill Clinton appointed Mauro to be the Chairman of the Federal Fleet Conversion Task Force for Alternative Fuels which further implemented those measures.

Also in 1989, the Legislature passed a bill pushed by Mauro to facilitate the recycling of plastics. The bill requires manufacturers to code their plastic items according to resins used.

Mauro convinced the U.S. Senate to ratify the Annex V provision of the MARPOL Treaty, which outlaws the dumping of plastic items in the world's oceans. His main objective was to help clean up the Gulf of Mexico and reduce beach litter. His efforts also resulted in the International Maritime Organization designating the Gulf and the "Wider Caribbean" as a "special area" to prohibit ships from dumping anything in the Gulf, with the exception of finely-ground food scraps.

In 1991, Mauro played a key role in gaining passage of the Oil Spill Prevention & Response Act which makes the land office the lead state agency for spills in state waters, and coastal management legislation which gives the Land Office a strong hand in matters of environmental consequence along the coast.

The 1991 omnibus recycling bill backed by Mauro requires state purchasers to give preference to goods made of recycled materials, set a state goal of recycling 40 percent of the garbage stream, provided for development of standards for collection of household hazardous wastes, and for the recycling of old tires, batteries, and used motor oil. The Land Office made a statewide marketing study to facilitate the development of recycling businesses in the state.

In 1992, he served as the Texas State Chairman for Bill Clinton's presidential campaign. He took on the same role in 1996 for Clinton-Gore, in 2000 for Al Gore (as a co-chairman) and in 2004 for Dick Gephardt. In 2008 and again in 2016, he served as the Texas State Director for Hillary Clinton's presidential campaign.

After leaving office in 1999, he was appointed to the Fannie Mae Board of Directors by President Bill Clinton.

He is referenced in Bill Clinton's 2004 memoir My Life. Mauro met the future President and First Lady in 1972 while working on George McGovern's presidential campaign in Austin.

Mauro is the author of the memoir Beaches, Bureaucrats & Big Oil: One Man's Fight for Texas. The book was published in 1997.

Mauro is a member of the Bar in Texas and the District of Columbia. He has served as an independent member of the board of LifeVantage Corporation since 2008; from 2013-2023, he served as the board's Chairman. He holds a Series 6 & 7 Securities license and is a Managing Director for EntrustGlobal. He is also a Partner of Mauro Archer and Associates LLC, a law firm in Washington, DC.

Mauro lives in Austin, Texas and has five children and two grandchildren.

Political offices
Preceded by Bob Armstrong	Land Commissioner of Texas; 1983–1999	Succeeded by David Dewhurst
Party political offices
Preceded by Bob Armstrong	Democratic nominee for Land Commissioner of Texas; 1982, 1986, 1990, 1994	Succeeded by Richard Raymond
Preceded by Ann Richards	Democratic nominee for Governor of Texas; 1998	Succeeded by Tony Sanchez
