= 1994 Texas State Treasurer election =

- November 8, 1994

Nominee	Martha Whitehead	David Hartman
Party	Democratic	Republican
Popular vote	2,085,274	2,060,707
Percentage	50.3%	49.7%
Treasurer before election
Martha Whitehead
Democratic
Elected Treasurer
Martha Whitehead
Democratic

The 1994 Texas State Treasurer election was held on November 8, 1994, to elect the Texas State Treasurer. Democratic incumbent Martha Whitehead had been appointed to the position by Governor Ann Richards following the election of Kay Bailey Hutchison to the United States Senate in a special election. Whitehead ran for a full term on a campaign of abolishing the office of State Treasurer and transferring the responsibilities of the office to the State Comptoller. She narrowly defeated Republican candidate David Hartman. In 1996, Texas voters approved a constitutional amendment abolishing the office.

== Democratic primary ==
=== Results ===
Democratic primary
Party	Candidate	Votes	%
Democratic	Martha Whitehead (incumbent)	606,650	66.1%
Democratic	Grady Yarborough	310,620	33.9%
Total votes		917,270	100.00%

== Republican primary ==
=== Results ===
Republican primary results
Party	Candidate	Votes	%
Republican	David Hartman	336,456	75.1%
Republican	Mike Wolfe	111,161	24.9
Total votes		447,717	100.00%

== General election ==
=== Results ===
1994 Texas State Treasurer election results
Party	Candidate	Votes	%	±%
Democratic	Martha Whitehead (incumbent)	2,085,274	50.3%	▲3.7
Republican	David Hartman	2,060,707	49.7%	▼0.2
Total votes		3,498,933	100.0%	
Democratic hold				
