= Groos =

Groos is a surname. Notable people with the surname include:

- Arthur Groos (born 1943), American philologist, musicologist, medievalist and Germanist
- David Groos (1918–1976), Canadian politician
- Friedrich Groos (1768–1852), German physician and philosopher
- Kaare Steel Groos (1917–1994), Norwegian politician
- Karl Groos (1861–1946), German psychologist
- Margaret Groos (born 1959), American athlete
- Richard Groos (died 1407), English politician
- Wilhelm Gisbert Groos (1894–1997), German World War I flying ace

== Other ==
- Groos, Michigan, an unincorporated community
- Carl W. A. Groos House (New Braunfels, Texas)
- Carl Wilhelm August Groos House (San Antonio, Texas)
