= Carl Wilhelm August Groos House =

Carl Wilhelm August Groos House or Carl W. A. Groos House may refer to:

- Carl Wilhelm August Groos House (San Antonio), listed on the National Register of Historic Places (NRHP)
- Carl W. A. Groos House (New Braunfels, Texas), NRHP-listed
