= 1990 Texas State Treasurer election =

- November 6, 1990
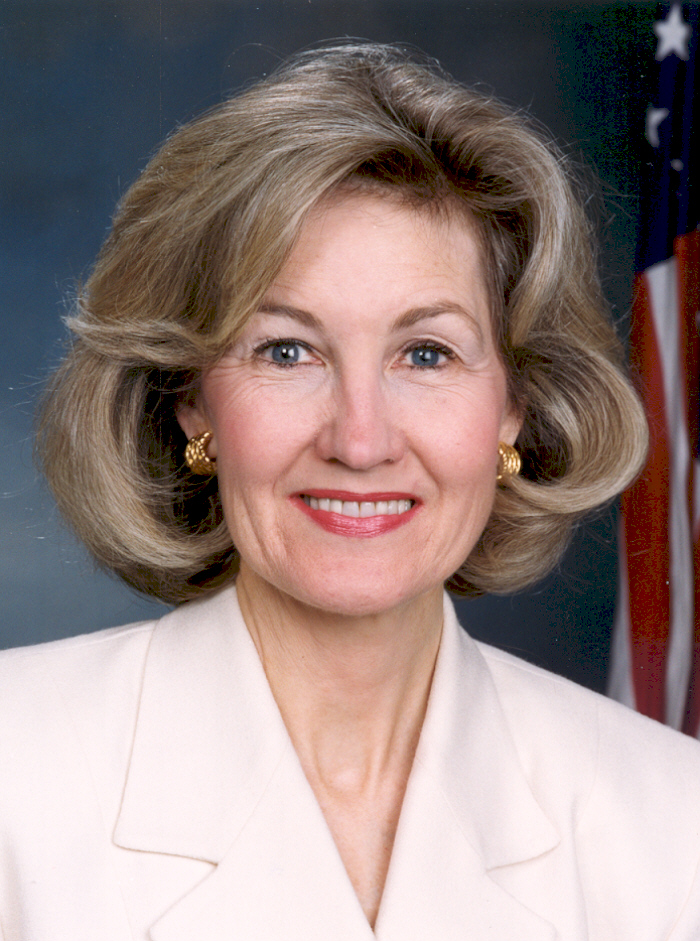

Nominee	Kay Bailey Hutchison	Nikki Van Hightower
Party	Republican	Democratic
Popular vote	1,895,651	1,772,200
Percentage	49.9%	46.6%
Treasurer before election
Ann Richards
Democratic
Elected Treasurer
Kay Bailey Hutchison
Republican

The 1990 Texas State Treasurer election was held on November 6, 1990, to elect the Texas State Treasurer. Democratic incumbent Ann Richards ran for a governor instead of seeking a third term. Republican candidate Kay Bailey Hutchison won the general election against Democratic candidate Nikki Van Hightower. Hutchinson was the first Republican to hold the office since Reconstruction.

== Democratic primary ==
=== Results ===
Democratic primary
Party	Candidate	Votes	%
Democratic	Nikki Van Hightower	424,027	33.9%
Democratic	Tom Bowden	331,886	26.5%
Democratic	Armando Gutierrez	263,132	21.0%
Democratic	Karen Friend	232,973	18.6%
Total votes		1,252,018	100.00%

Democratic primary runoff
Party	Candidate	Votes	%
Democratic	Nikki Van Hightower	666,407	66.7%
Democratic	Tom Bowden	333,355	33.3%
Total votes		999,762	100.00%

== Republican primary ==
=== Results ===
Republican primary results
Party	Candidate	Votes	%
Republican	Kay Bailey Hutchison	509,701	77.9%
Republican	Charlotte Self	144,374	22.1%
Total votes		654,075	100.00%

== General election ==
=== Results ===
1990 Texas State Treasurer election results
Party	Candidate	Votes	%	±%
Republican	Kay Bailey Hutchison	1,895,651	49.9%	▲49.9
Democratic	Nikki Van Hightower	1,772,200	46.6%	▼45.1
Libertarian	Suzanne Love	130,543	3.4%	▼4.9
Total votes		3,498,933	100.0%	
Republican gain from Democratic				
