= 1993 United States Senate special election in Texas =

- May 1, 1993 (first round); June 6, 1993 (runoff)
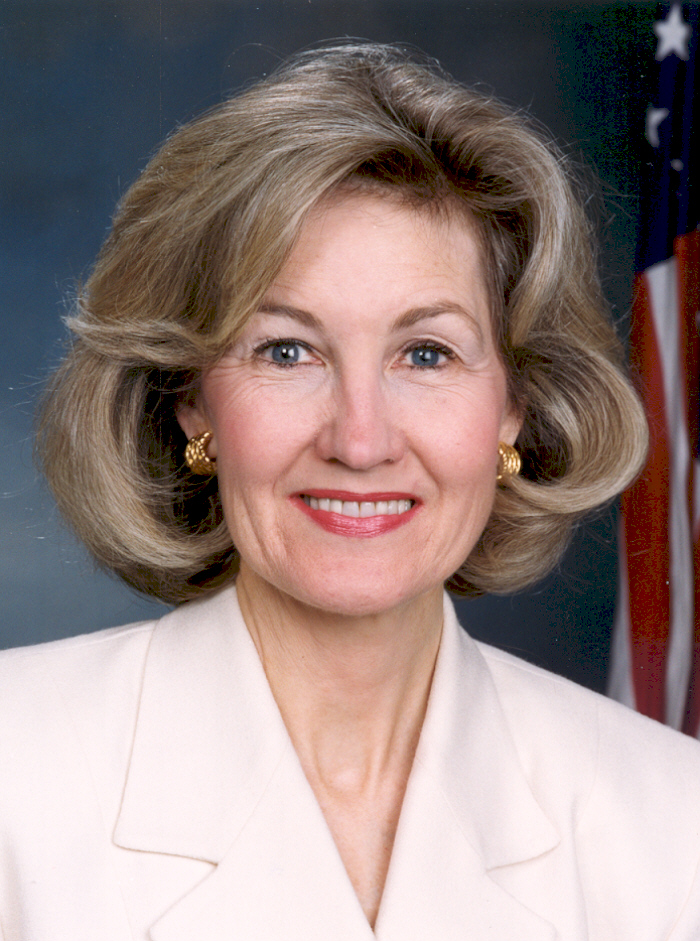

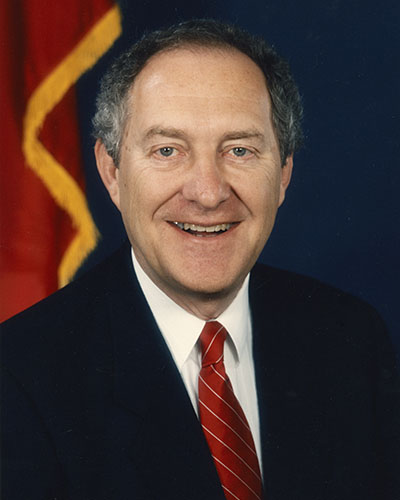

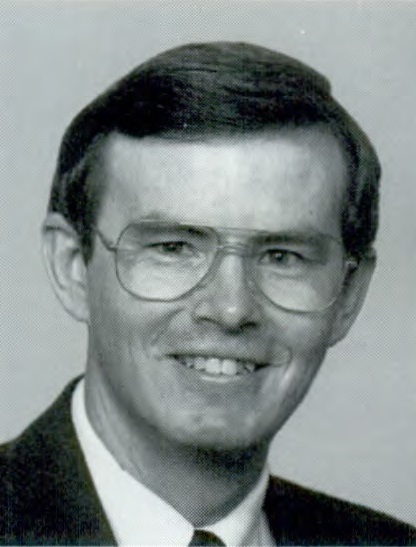

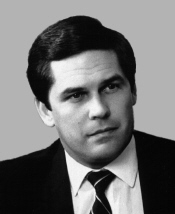

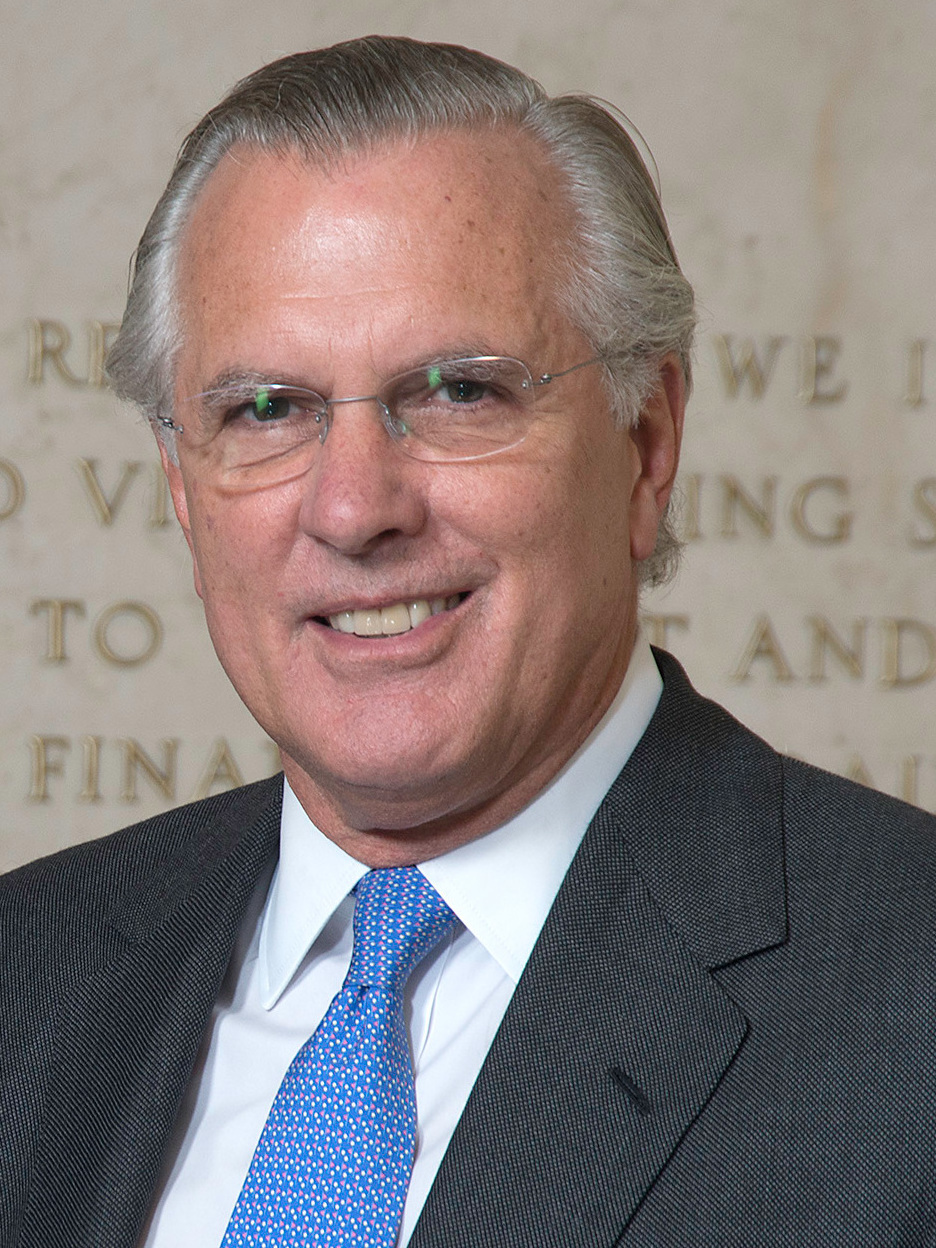
Candidate	Kay Bailey Hutchison	Bob Krueger	Joe Barton
Party	Republican	Democratic	Republican
First round	593,338; 29.00%	593,239; 29.00%	284,135; 13.89%
Runoff	1,188,716; 67.34%	576,538; 32.66%	Eliminated
Candidate	Jack Fields	Richard W. Fisher
Party	Republican	Democratic
First round	277,560; 13.57%	165,564; 8.09%
Runoff	Eliminated	Eliminated
- Hutchison: 20–30% 30–40% 40–50% Krueger: 20–30% 30–40% 40–50% 50–60% 60–70% Barton: 20–30% 30–40% 40–50% Fields: 20–30% 30–40% 40–50% Gutiérrez: 50–60% Tie: 20–30% 30–40% Hutchison: 50–60% 60–70% 70–80% 80–90% >90% Krueger: 50–60% 60–70% 70–80% 80–90%
U.S. senator before election
Bob Krueger
Democratic
Elected U.S. Senator
Kay Bailey Hutchison
Republican

The 1993 United States Senate special election in Texas was held on June 6, 1993, to replace Democratic U.S. Senator Lloyd Bentsen, who had resigned to become Secretary of the Treasury. Governor Ann Richards appointed Democrat Bob Krueger, a Texas Railroad Commissioner, to fill the seat. Krueger ran in the special election, but was defeated in a landslide by Republican Kay Bailey Hutchison. The nonpartisan blanket primary was held on May 1, 1993. Since no candidate received a majority in the primary, a runoff was held on June 6, 1993.

Hutchison was the first Republican to win this seat since Reconstruction in 1875 and the first Republican ever to be popularly elected to this seat. It was the first time since then that Republicans held both of the state's Senate seats simultaneously. In 2010, Krueger's campaign was named by the Houston Chronicle as the worst in Texas' modern political history. Hutchinson became the first woman to serve as a senator from Texas.

== Candidates ==
=== Democratic ===
- Richard W. Fisher, businessman
- José Ángel Gutiérrez
- Gene Kelly
- Bob Krueger, incumbent U.S. Senator and former U.S. Congressman
- C. "Sonny" Payne

=== Republican ===
- Kay Bailey Hutchison, Texas State Treasurer and former State Representative
- Joe Barton, U.S. Congressman
- Jack Fields, U.S. Congressman
- Charles Ben Howell
- Chuck Sibley
- Thomas D. Spink
- Herbert John Spiro
- James Vallaster
- Clymer Wright

=== Libertarian ===
- Rick Draheim

=== People's ===
- Billy Brown

=== Socialist Workers ===
- Rose "Jackie" Floyd

=== Independents ===
- Louis C. Davis
- Lou Bolling Hancock
- Roger Henson
- Don Richardson
- Maco Stewart
- Lou Zaeske

== Primary election ==
=== Results ===
Nonpartisan blanket primary results
Party	Candidate	Votes	%
Republican	Kay Bailey Hutchison	593,338	29.00%
Democratic	Bob Krueger (incumbent)	593,239	29.00%
Republican	Joe Barton	284,135	13.89%
Republican	Jack Fields	277,560	13.57%
Democratic	Richard W. Fisher	165,564	8.09%
Democratic	José Ángel Gutiérrez	52,103	2.55%
Republican	Stephen Hopkins	14,753	0.72%
Democratic	Gene Kelly	11,331	0.55%
Democratic	C. "Sonny" Payne	6,782	0.33%
Independent	Don Richardson	6,209	0.30%
Libertarian	Rick Draheim	5,677	0.28%
Republican	Clymer Wright	5,111	0.25%
Republican	Herbert John Spiro	4,459	0.22%
Republican	Charles Ben Howell	3,866	0.19%
Independent	Roger Henson	3,092	0.15%
Republican	Chuck Sibley	2,406	0.12%
Socialist Workers	Rose "Jackie" Floyd	2,301	0.11%
Republican	Thomas D. Spink	2,281	0.11%
Independent	Lou Bolling Hancock	2,242	0.11%
Independent	Lou Zaeske	2,191	0.11%
Populist	Billy Brown	2,187	0.11%
Republican	James Vallaster	2,124	0.10%
Independent	Louis C. Davis	1,548	0.08%
Independent	Maco Stewart	1,260	0.06%
Total votes		2,045,759	100.0%

== Special Election Run-off ==
=== Results ===
United States Senate special election in Texas, 1993
Party	Candidate	Votes	%
Republican	Kay Bailey Hutchison	1,188,716	67.34%
Democratic	Bob Krueger (incumbent)	576,538	32.66%
Total votes		1,765,254	100.0%
Republican gain from Democratic			

== See also ==
- 1992 United States Senate elections
