= Clymer Wright =

American journalist

- Born: Clymer Lewis Wright, Jr. July 24, 1932
- Died: January 24, 2011 (aged 78); Houston, Texas
- Education: University of Southern Mississippi
- Occupations: Journalist, businessman
- Political party: Republican
- Spouse(s): Sandra Jean Lee Wright (married ca. 1954–1988, her death); Mary Katherine Sheftall Wright (1990–2010, her death)
- Children: 4

Clymer Lewis Wright Jr. (July 24, 1932 – January 24, 2011) was a Texas conservative political activist and journalist. He brought term limits to Houston municipal government and encouraged Ronald Reagan to run for president.

== Personal life ==
A veteran of the United States Army in the Korean War, Wright was active in the Baptist Church and in the alumni association of his alma mater, the University of Southern Mississippi in Hattiesburg, Mississippi.

== Journalist ==
During the middle 1950s, as owner and editor of the Fort Bend Reporter in Rosenberg, Texas, Wright survived death threats targeting himself as well as his family, but he joined with state authorities and the Texas Rangers to rid Galveston and Fort Bend Counties of organized crime, including brothels and illegal casinos. Wright sold the Fort Bend Reporter as early as 1957. After further changes of ownership, on August 27, 2005, it became the Fort Bend Herald and Texas Coaster.

Wright later published a second conservative newspaper, the Houston Tribune.

== Reagan Republican ==
In 1968, Wright was a leader of Texans for Reagan, but Reagan did not enter that presidential race until he reached the national convention held in Miami Beach, Florida. By then, Richard Nixon had sewn up sufficient support to become the party's nominee for the second nonconsecutive time.

Wright was part of the 100-member Reagan delegation to the 1976 Republican National Convention in Kansas City, Missouri. When delegates nominated incumbent President Gerald Ford, Wright said, "There is no way I am going to support Jimmy Carter. But Ford is going to be a drag on our local candidates. Naturally, it's going to take so much time to work for them, we're not going to have much time to work for Ford."

Barbara Staff, the Texas Reagan co-chairman from Dallas, said, "You may just see a big apathetic heartbreak take over. I would say at this point most people here are not going to work for Ford."

In 1980, Wright chaired the Texas finance committee for the successful Reagan presidential campaign even though two other Houston-based candidates were also in the running: George H. W. Bush, the eventual vice president, and John B. Connally, Jr., the governor of Texas from 1963 to 1969, who had switched to the Republican Party in 1973 after the death of his mentor, Lyndon Johnson.

In 1982, Wright joined Howard Phillips, a former Nixon administration official who founded the Conservative Caucus in an unsuccessful effort to convince Reagan to dismiss Houston attorney James A. Baker, III as presidential chief of staff. Wright claimed that Baker, a former Democrat and a political intimate of Bush, was undercutting conservative initiatives in the administration. Not only did Reagan reject the Wright-Phillips request, but in 1985, he named Baker as United States Secretary of the Treasury, at Baker's request in a job-swap with then Secretary Donald T. Regan, a former Merrill Lynch officer who became chief of staff. Reagan also rebuked Wright for waging a "campaign of sabotage" against Baker.

On February 6, 2011, thirteen days after Wright's death, Baker was invited by Nancy Davis Reagan to deliver one of the principal addresses from the Reagan Library in Simi Valley, California, to commemorate Reagan's 100th birthday.

== Term limits ==
In the early 1990s, Wright formed the interest group, "Citizens for Term Limitations", which worked successfully in passing the initiative that established term limits of three two-year terms in the nation's fourth largest city. San Antonio also enacted term limits about this time. When Houston officeholders knocked on doors to oppose the term limits initiative in 1991, Wright urged backers of term limits to "Sick your dogs on 'em." The success of the term limits measure coincided with the election of Democrat Bob Lanier, who unseated Mayor Kathy Whitmire, a ten-year incumbent, in the nonpartisan election. The 1991 initiative passed with 56.9 percent of the vote. In 1994, Wright spearheaded a second voter drive that removed a loophole that Houston officials created in the law which had enabled them to petition for a ballot position even after three terms.

== Later years ==
In 2000, he served as the national finance chairman for presidential candidate Patrick Buchanan, the former Republican who ran as the Reform Party's nominee. In 2008, Wright supported U.S. Representative Ron Paul of Texas, an unsuccessful candidate for the Republican presidential nomination. When the GOP nominated U.S. Senator John McCain of Arizona, Wright contributed to the Constitution Party nominee Chuck Baldwin, a Baptist pastor in Pensacola, Florida, who has since relocated to Montana.

Though Wright did not support McCain for President with any contributions, he was finance chairman in 2007–2008 for the Republican congressional candidate Shelley Sekula-Gibbs, who failed in her second bid for the position, having lost in 2006 to the Democrat Nick Lampson. Then Gibbs lost the 2008 Republican primary to Pete Olson as the representative from Texas's 22nd congressional district, a position once held by House Majority Leader Tom DeLay of Fort Bend County. Wright declared that Gibbs, a physician, was "exactly the type of principled, conservative leader we need in TX-22, and I'm proud to give her my support."

Wright's greatest political success lay with the Houston term limits. While numerous politicians have floated trial balloons to rescind the term limits, they nevertheless remain in place. Upon Wright's death, Barry Klein, another Houston conservative activist, said in an email: "Incumbents in City Hall are probably breathing easier."

Wright himself ran for office only once, in the 1993 special election for the U.S. Senate seat vacated when Democrat, Lloyd M. Bentsen, Jr., also of Houston, resigned to join the Bill Clinton administration as the treasury secretary. Wright finished near the bottom of the multi-candidate field with only 5,111 votes statewide, less than one quarter of 1 percent of the vote. The seat was ultimately won by Republican Kay Bailey Hutchison, who unseated the appointed incumbent Robert Krueger in a runoff election.

For the eighteen years prior to his death, Wright had been an executive with Aflac Insurance, after his early career in journalism and, subsequently, in real estate.

== Family and death ==
While studying journalism in college, he met Sandra, his first wife. They had three children together. In 1990, Wright married the former Mary Katherine Sheftall (January 5, 1943– November 11, 2010), a Houston native. Mary Wright attended Emory University in Atlanta, Georgia, and worked for both the Whitehall Hotel and the University of Texas MD Anderson Cancer Center in Houston before joining Clymer Wright at Aflac Insurance. She had a daughter from a previous marriage. Mary Wright died of heart failure in a Houston hospital at the age of 67.

Wright was found dead, apparently of natural causes, by a housekeeper. He was sitting in a chair, wearing pajamas, and the morning newspaper was nearby. His daughter said he had not been ill.

In addition to daughter Cindy, Wright had two other children, Clymer Wright, III (born 1961) and Linda Wright Tomasetti. Wright was also survived by a sister, a brother, five grandchildren, and one great-grandson.

A memorial service was held on January 30, 2011, at Christchurch Baptist Fellowship in Houston. Gary M. Polland, former Harris County GOP chairman, said that the activist "had an infectious personality, strong laugh, and his enthusiasm and zest for ideas and issues would leave you passionate one way or another."
