= Bob Krueger =

American politician (1935–2022)

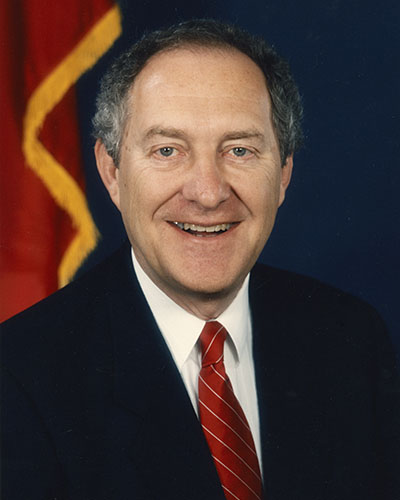
- Official portrait, 1993

United States Ambassador to Botswana
- In office July 23, 1996 – December 6, 1999
- Nominated by: Bill Clinton
- Preceded by: Howard Jeter
- Succeeded by: John E. Lange

United States Ambassador to Burundi
- In office June 29, 1994 – September 10, 1995
- Nominated by: Bill Clinton
- Preceded by: Cynthia Shepard Perry
- Succeeded by: Morris N. Hughes Jr.

United States Senator from Texas
- In office January 21, 1993 – June 14, 1993
- Appointed by: Ann Richards
- Preceded by: Lloyd Bentsen
- Succeeded by: Kay Bailey Hutchison

Railroad Commissioner of Texas
- In office January 3, 1991 – January 21, 1993
- Governor: Bill Clements; Ann Richards
- Preceded by: Kent Hance
- Succeeded by: Mary Scott Nabers

Member of the U.S. House of Representatives from Texas's 21st district
- In office January 3, 1975 – January 3, 1979
- Preceded by: O. C. Fisher
- Succeeded by: Tom Loeffler

Personal details
- Born: Robert Charles Krueger; September 19, 1935 New Braunfels, Texas, U.S.
- Died: April 30, 2022 (aged 86) New Braunfels, Texas, U.S.
- Resting place: Texas State Cemetery; Austin, Texas
- Party: Democratic
- Spouse: Kathleen Tobin
- Children: 3
- Education: Southern Methodist University (BA); Duke University (MA); Merton College, Oxford (MLitt, DPhil)

Robert Charles Krueger (September 19, 1935 – April 30, 2022) was an American diplomat, politician, and U.S. representative and U.S. senator from Texas, a U.S. ambassador, and a member of the Democratic Party.

Until James Talarico takes office in 2027, Krueger is the last Democrat to serve as a senator from Texas.

== Early life and education ==
Robert Charles Krueger was born in New Braunfels, Texas, the son of Faye (Leifeste) and Arlon E. Krueger. Krueger earned a B.A. from Southern Methodist University in 1957 and an M.A. from Duke University in 1958. He attended Merton College, Oxford, where he graduated with a D.Phil. in English literature. His thesis was entitled The Poems of William Herbert, Third Earl of Pembroke. He taught English literature as a professor and was later vice provost and Dean of the Trinity College of Arts and Sciences at Duke University. His edition of the poems of Sir John Davies was published by the Clarendon Press, Oxford, in 1975. Krueger held business positions as chairman of the board of Comal Hosiery Mills and managing partner of the Krueger Brangus Ranch before entering elective office.

== Career ==
=== Politics ===
Krueger was elected to the 94th and 95th United States Congresses, serving from January 3, 1975, to January 3, 1979. Krueger was initially elected to the U.S. House of Representatives to represent Texas's 21st congressional district, then the largest congressional district in Texas, stretching from northern San Antonio to Big Bend National Park in far west Texas.

In the general election, Krueger defeated Republican Doug Harlan of San Antonio, who had run a surprisingly close race against longtime incumbent Democrat O.C. Fisher in 1972 despite spending almost no money. Krueger won by an even closer margin despite setting a record for spending in a congressional race at the time. Meanwhile, Harlan, as he had two years before, campaigned on a shoestring.

Coincidentally, Harlan like Krueger had obtained a master's degree from Duke University. He then received a law degree from the University of Texas School of Law and became heavily involved in Republican Party consulting work.

Krueger was part of the large "Watergate Class" of 1974, many of whom were Democrats elected in the wake of the scandal that brought the resignation of President Richard Nixon three months before the election. Krueger was reelected for a second House term in 1976 along with the election of Jimmy Carter as president. Krueger challenged incumbent Republican John Tower in 1978 for a U.S. Senate seat from Texas, but Krueger narrowly lost the contest by 0.3%.

In 1984, he ran again for the U.S. Senate. Tower decided to retire but Krueger lost in the Democratic primary, caught in the middle between the more liberal State Senator Lloyd Doggett and the more conservative U.S. Representative Kent Hance. In 2010, Krueger's campaign was named by the Houston Chronicle as the ninth-worst in Texas' modern political history, saying: "Caught in the middle, Krueger seemed like a bland centrist facing a fiery liberal and a folksy conservative. He ended up finishing third, out of the runoff and out of luck." From 1985 to 1989, he also wrote a regular column on a broad range of public affairs issues, which was carried in newspapers in San Antonio, Dallas, Houston, and Corpus Christi, Texas.

In 1990, Krueger returned to elective office in Texas, serving on the Texas Railroad Commission, which regulated oil and gas as well as the rail system in the state. In his candidacy, Krueger received the most votes of any contested candidate on the primary ballot of either major party and defeated his general election opponent by a 16 percent margin.

He was appointed by Governor Ann Richards in 1993 to the U.S. Senate to fill the vacancy caused by the resignation of four-term incumbent and 1988 Democratic vice presidential nominee Lloyd Bentsen, who became Secretary of the Treasury in President Clinton's cabinet. He served from January 21, 1993, until June 14, 1993. He lost the June 1993 special election runoff for the remainder of the term ending January 3, 1995 by a 2-to-1 margin to the popular Texas State Treasurer, Republican Kay Bailey Hutchison. In 2010, Krueger's campaign was named by the same Houston Chronicle article as the single worst in Texas' modern political history. Reasons cited for the defeat included Krueger's flip-flopping over don't ask, don't tell and also Bill Clinton's proposed BTU tax, which was unpopular in Texas.

=== Diplomacy ===
On October 23, 1979, Krueger was appointed by President Carter as Ambassador-at-Large and Coordinator for Mexican Affairs at the U.S. Department of State and served the remainder of the Carter presidency until February 1, 1981.

President Bill Clinton named Krueger as Ambassador to Burundi, which had been beset with violence in recent years and whose ethnic make-up was the same as that of adjoining Rwanda, whose Hutu and Tutsi groups had started a bloody civil war only months before Krueger began his service in May 1994. His family was initially not allowed to join him in Burundi due to the threat of violence. He served in Burundi until 1995, when his convoy was ambushed in Cibitoke province. He was traveling on a bare highway in Cibitoke, when gunmen with AK-47s attacked the motorcade, before being diverted by Diplomatic Security Service agents Chris Reilly and Larry Salmon.

In 1996, he was appointed U.S. Ambassador to Botswana and concurrently Special Representative of the Secretary of State to the Southern African Development Community. He held those posts until 2000, when he became a visiting fellow at Merton College, Oxford, and began to write a memoir of his time in central Africa. It was published as From Bloodshed to Hope in Burundi: Our Embassy Years during Genocide by the University of Texas Press in September 2007.

=== Later work ===
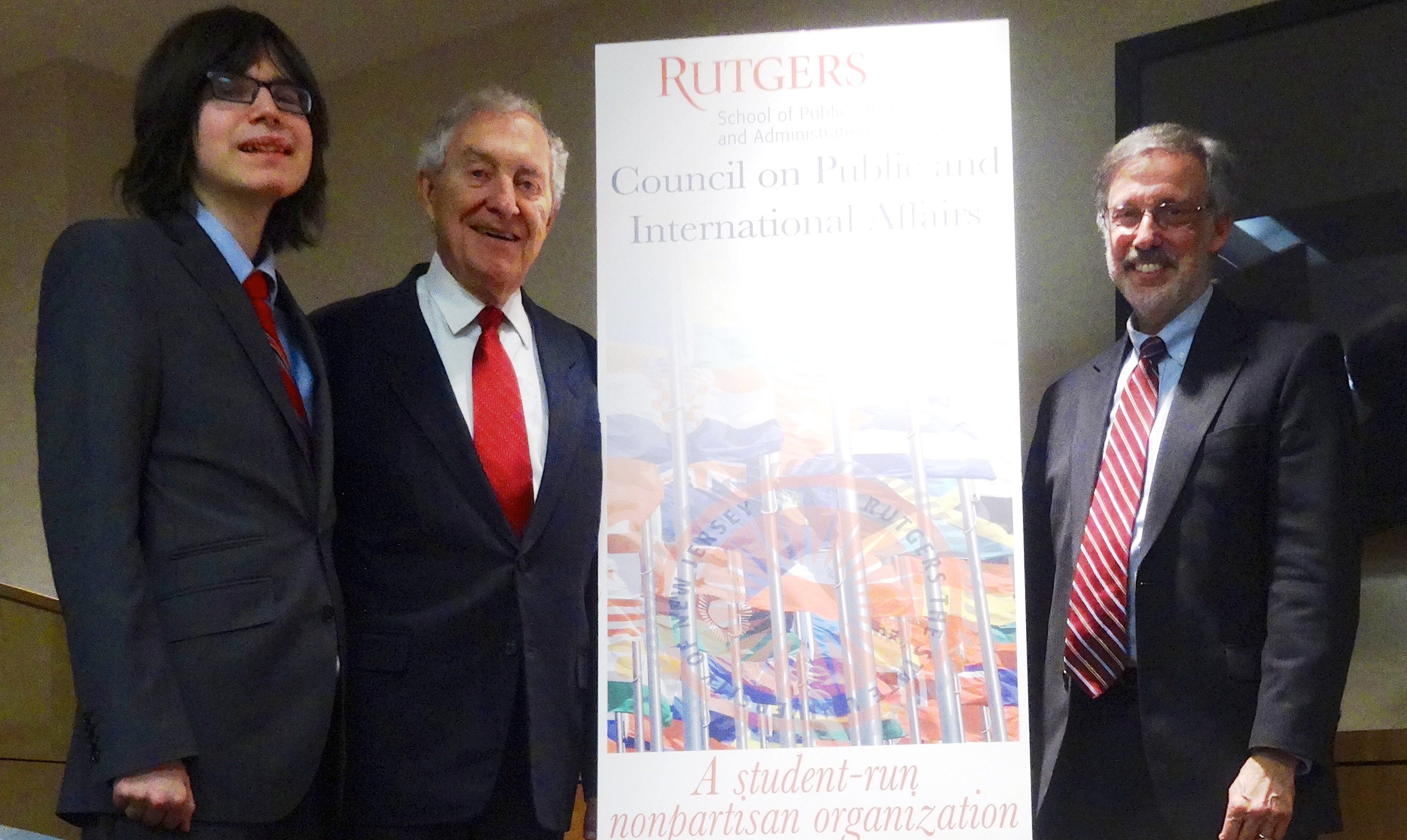
Krueger with Marc Holzer and Edmund Janniger at the Rutgers Council on Public and International Affairs

Krueger served in several academic lectureship positions at the University of North Texas (then known as North Texas State University), the University of Texas at Austin, Rice University, Southern Methodist University, Texas State University, and Texas Tech University, following his service in federal government. He delivered the Inaugural Distinguished Lecture of the Rutgers Council on Public and International Affairs on December 9, 2014.

== Personal life ==
Krueger was married to the former Kathleen Tobin of Bandera, Texas, who co-authored the book From Bloodshed to Hope in Burundi, and served two terms as a City Council Member in New Braunfels, Texas, and as Mayor Pro-tem. The Kruegers had three children. In the late 1980s, Krueger and his family were the victims of a stalker. Their experience led to the passage of a spate of anti-stalking laws in Texas.

Krueger died on April 30, 2022, at the age of 86, from congestive heart failure.

== See also ==
- Carl W. A. Groos House

U.S. House of Representatives
Preceded by O. C. Fisher	Member of the U.S. House of Representatives from Texas's 21st congressional district 1975–1979	Succeeded by Tom Loeffler
Party political offices
Preceded by Barefoot Sanders	Democratic nominee for U.S. Senator from Texas (Class 2); 1978	Succeeded by Lloyd Doggett
Preceded by Lloyd Bentsen	Democratic nominee for U.S. Senator from Texas (Class 1); 1993	Succeeded by Richard W. Fisher
Political offices
Preceded by Kent Hance	Railroad Commissioner of Texas; 1991–1993	Succeeded by Mary Scott Nabers
U.S. Senate
Preceded by Lloyd Bentsen	U.S. Senator (Class 1) from Texas; 1993; Served alongside: Phil Gramm	Succeeded by Kay Bailey Hutchison
Diplomatic posts
Preceded by Cynthia Perry	United States Ambassador to Burundi; 1994–1995	Succeeded by Morris Hughes
Preceded by Howard Jeter	United States Ambassador to Botswana; 1996–1999	Succeeded by John E. Lange
