= 1986 Texas State Treasurer election =

- November 4, 1986
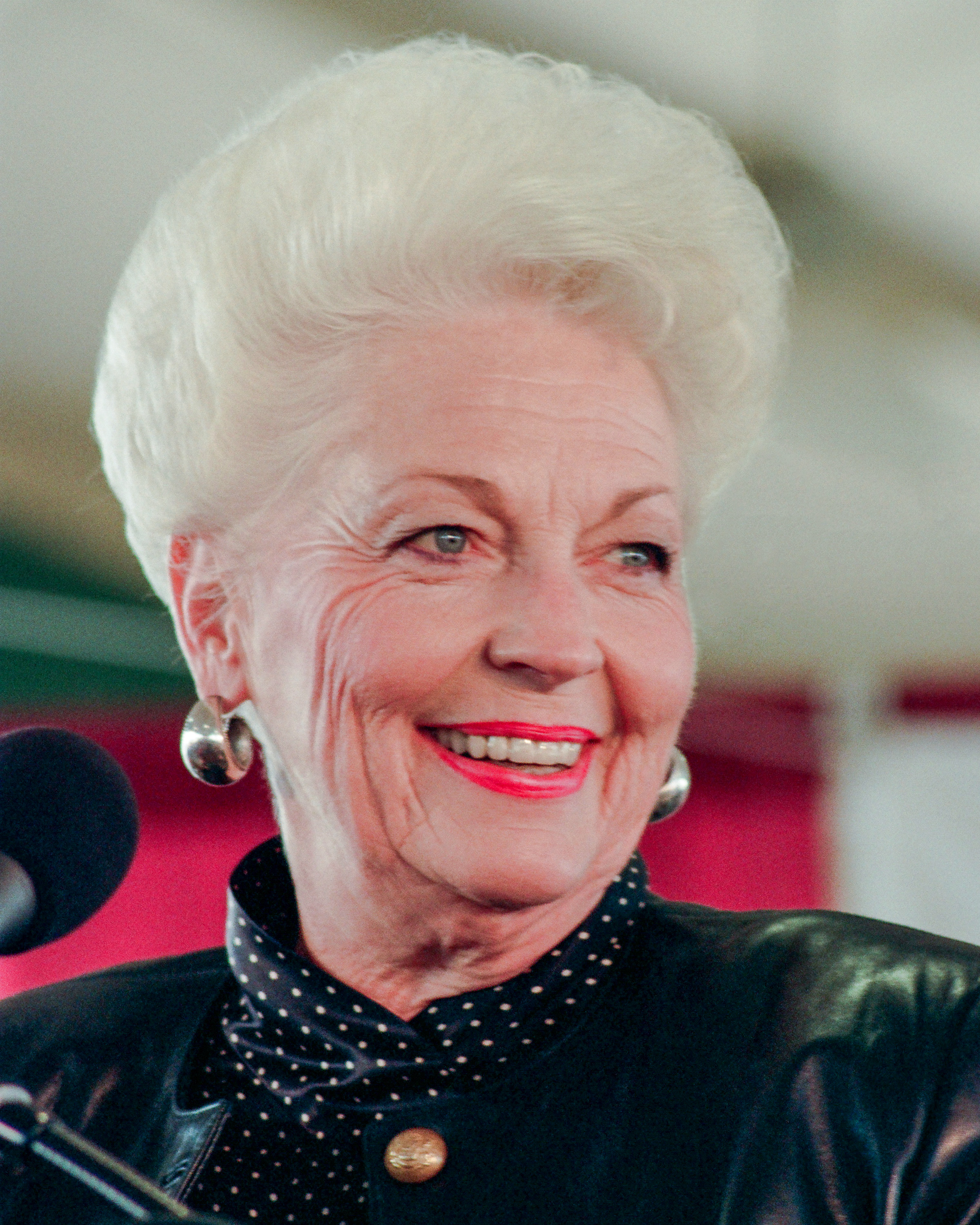

Nominee	Ann Richards	Robert Reid
Party	Democratic	Libertarian
Popular vote	2,425,836	220,024
Percentage	91.7%	8.3%
Treasurer before election
Ann Richards
Democratic
Elected Treasurer
Ann Richards
Democratic

The 1986 Texas State Treasurer election was held on November 4, 1986, to elect the Texas State Treasurer. Democratic incumbent Ann Richards ran for a second term. She ran effectively unopposed, facing only Libertarian candidate Robert Reid in the general election. Richards won the election with over 90% of the vote.

== Democratic primary ==
=== Candidates ===
- Ann Richards, incumbent, former Travis County Commissioner (1977–1983)

=== Results ===
Democratic primary results
Party	Candidate	Votes	%
Democratic	Ann Richards (incumbent)	858,977	100.00%
Total votes		858,977	100.00%

== General election ==
=== Results ===
1986 Texas State Treasurer election results
Party	Candidate	Votes	%	±%
Democratic	Ann Richards (incumbent)	2,425,836	91.7%	▲30.31
Libertarian	Robert Reid	220,024	8.3%	▲7.49
Total votes		2,645,860	100.00%	
Democratic hold				
