= 2000 United States Senate election in Texas =

- November 7, 2000
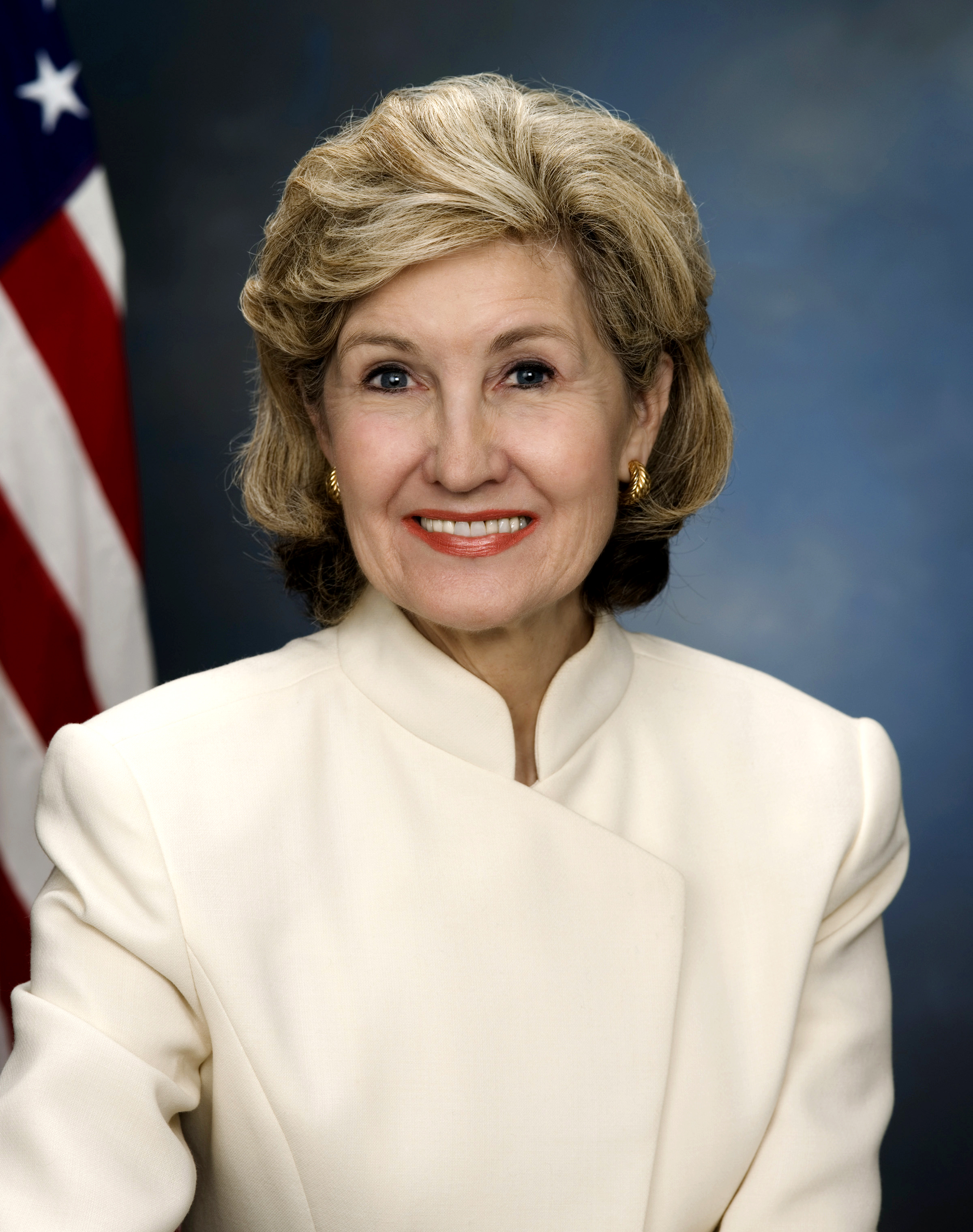

Nominee	Kay Bailey Hutchison	Gene Kelly
Party	Republican	Democratic
Popular vote	4,078,954	2,025,024
Percentage	65.08%	32.31%
- County results Hutchison: 40–50% 50–60% 60–70% 70–80% 80–90% >90% Kelly: 40–50% 50–60% 60–70% 70–80% 80–90%
U.S. senator before election
Kay Bailey Hutchison
Republican
Elected U.S. Senator
Kay Bailey Hutchison
Republican

The 2000 United States Senate election in Texas took place on November 7, 2000. Republican incumbent Kay Bailey Hutchison won re-election to a second full term in a landslide over Gene Kelly.

As of 2026, this election and the concurrent United States presidential election were the last time Travis County voted Republican in any statewide election. This election was last time any candidate won every county in the Texas Triangle in a statewide election.

== Republican primary ==
=== Candidates ===
- Kay Bailey Hutchison, incumbent U.S. senator since 1993

=== Results ===
Republican primary results
Party	Candidate	Votes	%
Republican	Kay Bailey Hutchison (incumbent)	955,033	100.00%
Total votes		955,033	100.00%

== Democratic primary ==
First round results by county: Kelly: 30–40%; 40–50%; 50–60%; 60–70%; Gandy: 30–40%; 40–50%; 50–60%; Clark: 30–40%; 40–50%; 50–60%

=== Candidates ===
==== Nominee ====
- Gene Kelly, retired attorney

==== Eliminated in runoff ====
- Charles Gandy, former state representative from the 105th district (1983–85)

==== Eliminated in primary ====
- Don Clark, former FBI special agent
- Bobby Wightman, civil rights attorney and activist
- H. Gerald Bintliff, developer and businessman

Democratic primary results
Party	Candidate	Votes	%
Democratic	Gene Kelly	220,531	35.68%
Democratic	Charles Gandy	140,636	22.76%
Democratic	Don Clark	139,243	22.53%
Democratic	Bobby Wightman	83,643	13.53%
Democratic	H. Gerald Bintliff	33,979	5.50%
Total votes		618,032	100.00%

Runoff results by county: Kelly: 50–60%; 60–70%; 70–80%; 80–90%; Gandy: 50–60%; 60–70%; 70–80%; 80–90%; >90%; Tie

=== Runoff ===
Democratic runoff results
Party	Candidate	Votes	%
Democratic	Gene Kelly	143,366	58.43%
Democratic	Charles Gandy	101,984	41.57%
Total votes		245,350	100.00%

== General election ==
=== Candidates ===
- Kay Bailey Hutchison, incumbent U.S. senator since 1993 (Republican)
- Gene Kelly, retired attorney (Democratic)
- Mary Ruwart (Libertarian)
- Douglas S. Sandage (Green)

=== Polling ===
Poll source	Date(s)	Sample size	Margin of error	Kay Bailey Hutchison (R)	Gene Kelly (D)	Other / undecided (Note: Calculated by taking the difference of 100% and all other candidates combined.)
Harris Insights & Analytics	November 3, 2000	17,907	—	63%	31%	6%
Scripps Howard	November 1, 2000	844	—	55%	23%	22%

=== Results ===
2000 United States Senate election in Texas
Party	Candidate	Votes	%	±%
Republican	Kay Bailey Hutchison (incumbent)	4,078,954	65.08%	+4.23%
Democratic	Gene Kelly	2,025,024	32.31%	−6.00%
Green	Douglas S. Sandage	91,329	1.46%	N/A
Libertarian	Mary J. Ruwart	72,657	1.16%	+0.32%
Majority		2,053,930	32.77%	+10.23%
Turnout		6,267,964		
Republican hold				

==== Counties that flipped from Democratic to Republican ====
- Foard (largest city: Crowell)
- Morris (largest city: Daingerfield)
- Robertson (largest city: Hearne)
- Kenedy (largest municipality: Sarita) (previously tied)
- Kleberg (largest municipality: Kingsville)
- Cameron (largest community: Brownsville)
- Knox (largest city: Munday)
- Limestone (largest city: Mexia)
- Stonewall (largest city: Aspermont)
- Trinity (largest city: Trinity)
- Jefferson (largest city: Beaumont)
- Webb (largest city: Laredo)
- King (largest city: Guthrie)

==== Counties that flipped from Republican to Democratic ====
- El Paso (largest city: El Paso)
- Presidio (largest city: Presidio)

== See also ==
- 2000 United States Senate elections
