= Gamna–Favre bodies =

Inclusion bodies of cells with Lymphogranuloma venereum

Gamna–Favre bodies are large, intracytoplasmic basophilic inclusion bodies seen in endothelial cells in patients with lymphogranuloma venereum.

They are named after Carlos Gamna and Maurice Favre.
