= H.R. 2289 (113th Congress) =

United States of America Congressional bill

- Long title: To rename section 219(c) of the Internal Revenue Code of 1986 as the Kay Bailey Hutchison Spousal IRA.
- Announced in: the 113th United States Congress
- Sponsored by: Rep. Sam Johnson (R, TX-3)
- Number of co-sponsors: 7

Codification
- Acts affected: Internal Revenue Code of 1986

[H.R. 2289 Legislative history]
- Introduced in the House as H.R. 2289 by Rep. Sam Johnson (R-TX) on June 6, 2013; Committee consideration by Ways and Means, Finance; Passed the House on June 25, 2013 (voice vote); Passed the Senate on July 11, 2013 (unanimous consent); Signed into law by President Barack Obama on July 25, 2013

H.R. 2289, the full title of which is To rename section 219(c) of the Internal Revenue Code of 1986 as the Kay Bailey Hutchison Spousal IRA (H.R. 2289) is a bill that was introduced in the United States House of Representatives during the 113th United States Congress. If passed, the bill would rename one section of the Internal Revenue Code after former U.S. Senator Kay Bailey Hutchison.

== Background ==
Kay Bailey Hutchison served as a senator from Texas from June 14, 1993, to January 3, 2013. During that time, she was heavily involved in changing the tax code so that married women working from home could open IRA savings accounts. She considered this one of the accomplishments in Congress that she was the most proud of.

== Provisions/Elements of the bill ==
This summary is based largely on the summary provided by the Congressional Research Service, a public domain source.

This bill would amend the Internal Revenue Code to rename the section heading of Internal Revenue Code provisions relating to the individual retirement accounts (IRAs) of married individuals as the Kay Bailey Hutchison Spousal IRA.

== Procedural history ==
H.R. 2289 was introduced into the House on June 6, 2013, by Rep. Sam Johnson (R-TX). It was referred to the United States House Committee on Ways and Means. On June 25, 2013, the House agreed by voice vote to pass the bill. It was sent to the United States Senate and referred to the United States Senate Committee on Finance.

== See also ==
- List of bills in the 113th United States Congress
- Kay Bailey Hutchison
- Internal Revenue Code
