= Gandy–Gamna nodules =

Pathological foci in the spleen

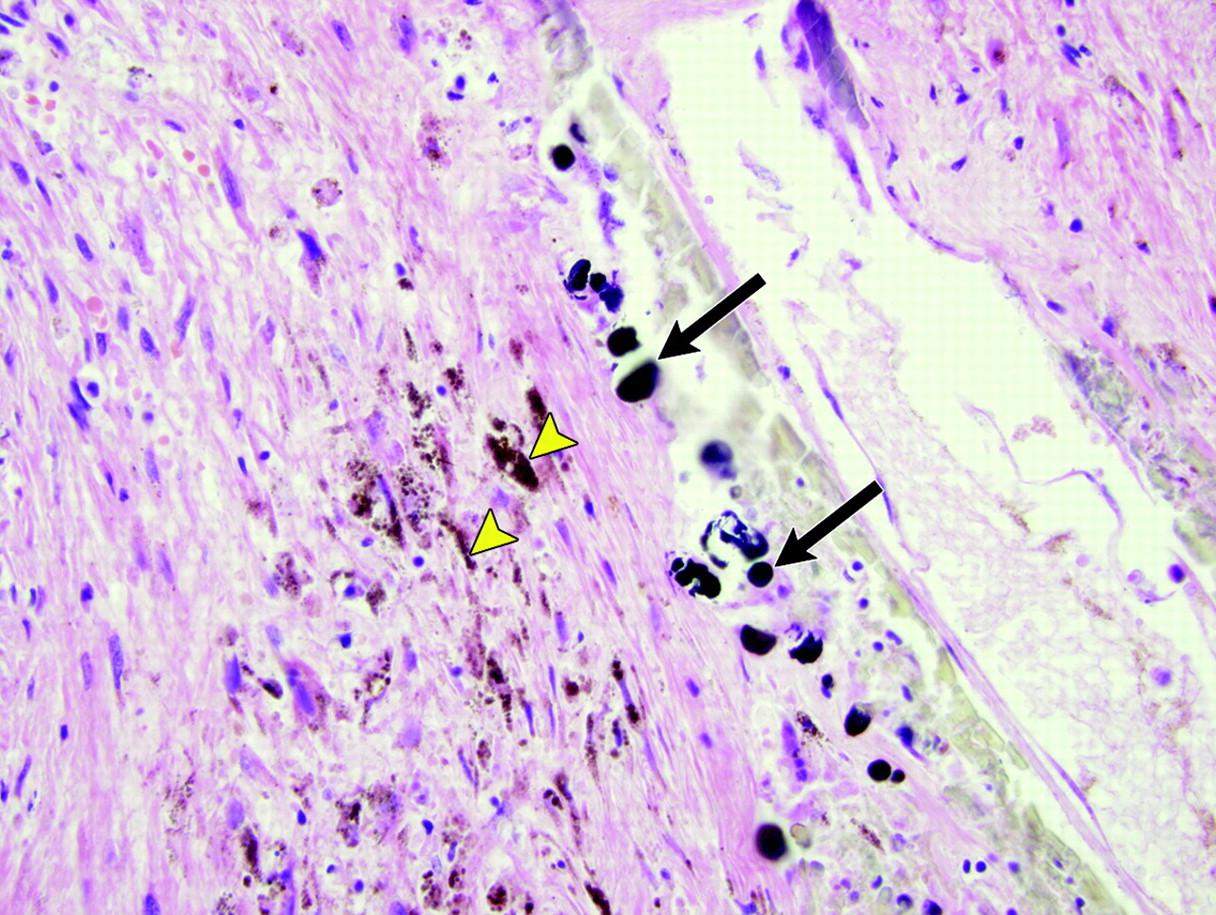
Micrograph of the spleen showing darkly stained, spheroid Gamna-Gandy bodies (arrows) outside the vessel wall at the center. Also shown is diffusely scattered, brown, granular hemosiderin pigment (arrowheads), indicating previous hemorrhage (hematoxylin & eosin staining, 40x magnification).

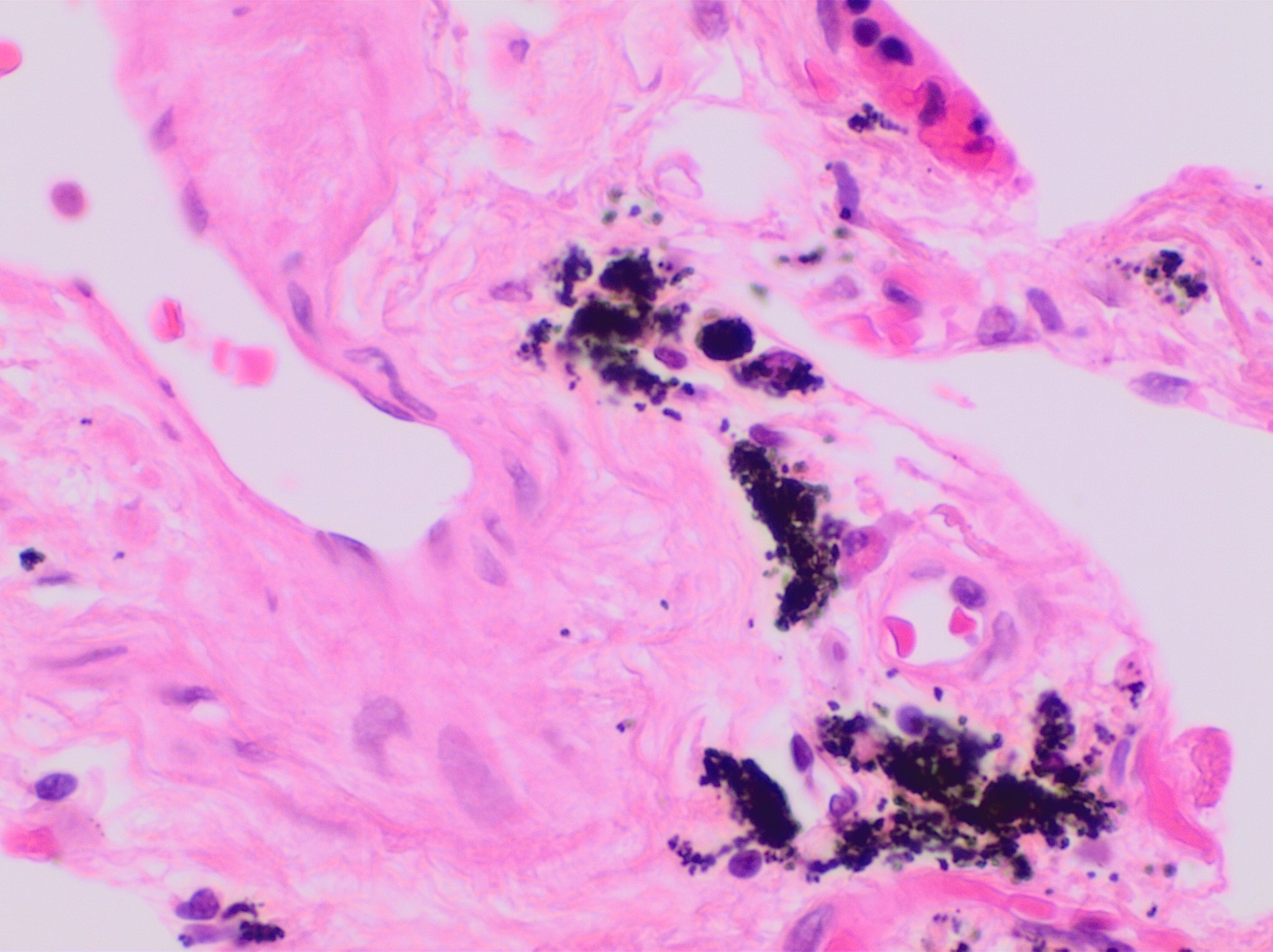
Gandy–Gamna nodules may also be seen in chronic pulmonary congestion.

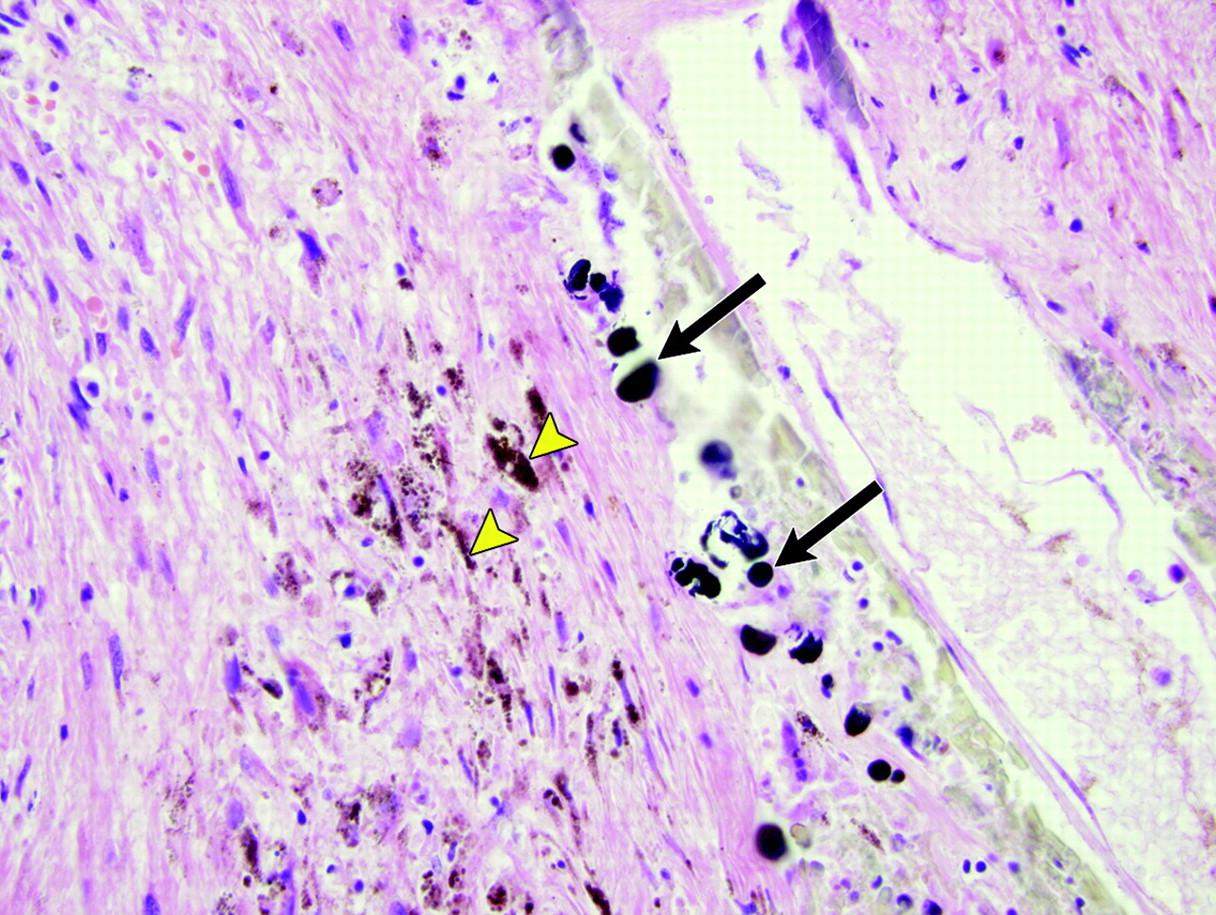
Micrograph of the spleen showing darkly stained, spheroid Gamna-Gandy bodies (arrows) outside the vessel wall at the center. Also shown is diffusely scattered, brown, granular hemosiderin pigment (arrowheads), indicating previous hemorrhage (hematoxylin & eosin staining, 40x magnification).

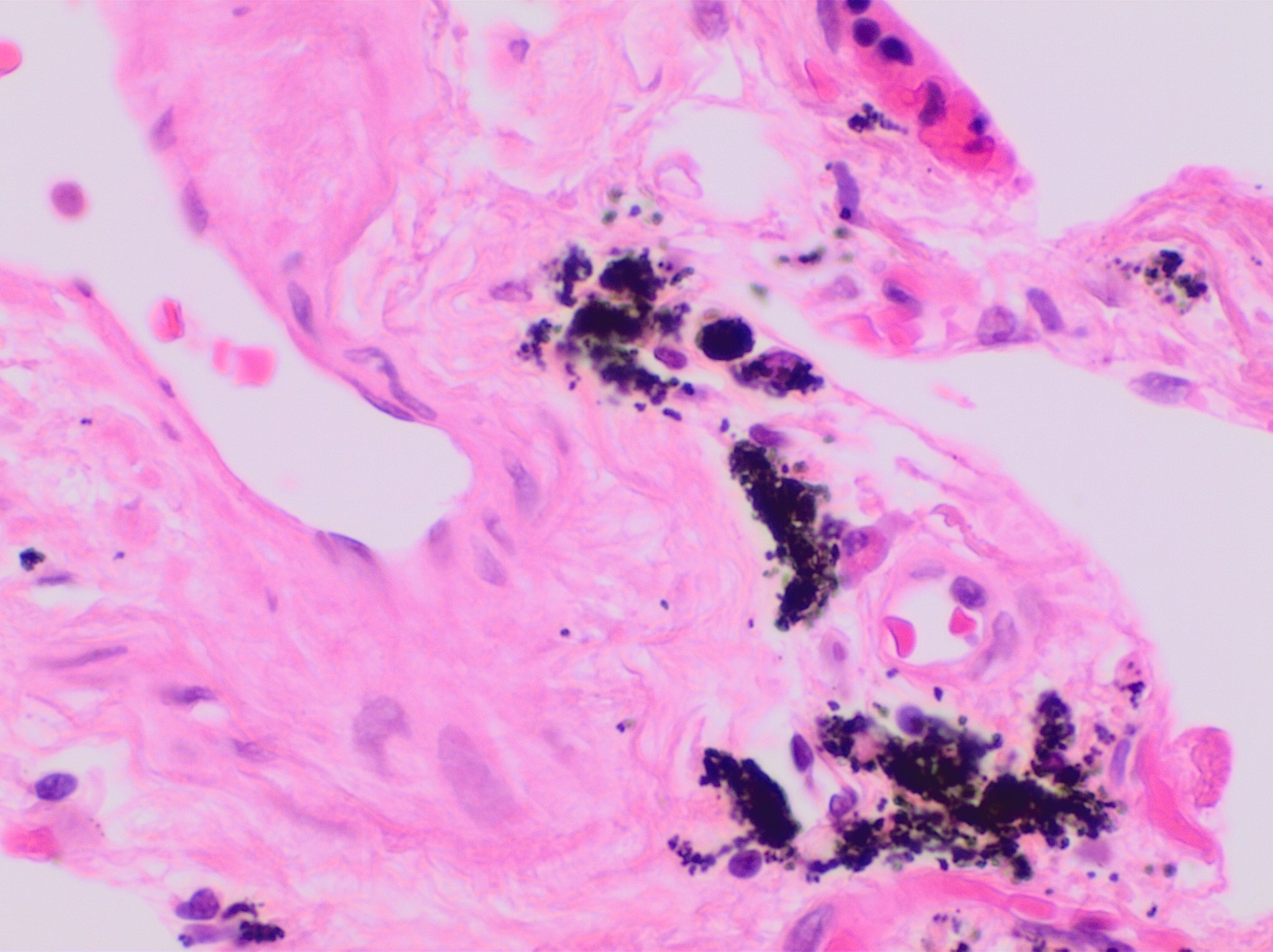
Gandy–Gamna nodules may also be seen in chronic pulmonary congestion.

Gandy–Gamna nodules or Gandy-Gamna bodies, also known as Gamna-Gandy bodies, Gamna-Gandy nodules or siderotic nodules, are small yellow-brown, brown, or rust-coloured foci found in the spleen in people with splenomegaly due to portal hypertension, as well as in sickle cell disease. They consist of fibrous tissue with haemosiderin and calcium deposits, and form by scarring at the sites of small perivascular haemorrhages. They are most clearly shown on MRI, on which the haemosiderin they contain produces a marked loss of signal.

The nodules are themselves harmless and need no treatment; they matter mainly as a sign of long-standing portal hypertension or another underlying disorder. Identical deposits occasionally arise outside the spleen, most often in atrial myxomas. They are named after the French physician Charles Gandy and the Italian pathologist Carlos Gamna.

== Morphology ==
On a cut surface of the spleen the nodules are well defined and a few millimetres across, each with a dark haemorrhagic centre, a paler inner rim and a darker outer rim. Under the microscope they are made of dense fibrous and collagenous tissue with elastic fibres, encrusted with haemosiderin and calcium salts, and they represent organised remnants of old bleeding rather than active infection or inflammation. The surrounding splenic tissue commonly carries scattered haemosiderin from earlier haemorrhage.

== Causes ==
The usual setting is portal hypertension, most often from cirrhosis of the liver, in which prolonged congestion of the spleen produces repeated small bleeds. The nodules are also found with portal or splenic vein thrombosis, haemolytic anaemias such as sickle cell disease and hereditary spherocytosis, leukaemia and lymphoma, after repeated blood transfusions, and in haemochromatosis and paroxysmal nocturnal haemoglobinuria. Where schistosomiasis is common, hepatosplenic schistosomiasis is an important cause.

Although the spleen is by far the most frequent site, the same deposits occur elsewhere. They are well recognised in cardiac myxomas, where they form linear strings of mineralised fibres at the edges of resolving bleeds, and have been reported less often in renal cell carcinoma, thymoma, thyroid nodules and lymph nodes.

== Mechanism ==
Portal hypertension makes the spleen enlarge and congest. Blood passes through it more slowly and at higher pressure, producing tiny haemorrhages in the red pulp. As the trapped blood breaks down, iron is laid down as haemosiderin, and over time the collagen and elastic fibres at the site take up iron and calcium and are walled off by a fibroblastic reaction, leaving a small firm iron-rich nodule.

== Imaging ==
MRI is the most sensitive method and is treated as the reference standard. Because the nodules contain iron they show low signal on every standard sequence and stand out most on gradient echo images, where distortion of the local magnetic field gives a "blooming" appearance that makes them look larger than they are. They are seen on MRI in roughly 9 to 12 per cent of patients with portal hypertension. Susceptibility weighted imaging is more sensitive again; in one study of 135 patients the number of nodules rose with the severity of portal hypertension and the presence of oesophageal varices, which the authors suggested might make the count a non-invasive marker.

Ultrasound, usually the first test when portal hypertension is suspected, shows the nodules as small bright spots in the spleen. Computed tomography is the least sensitive and detects them only once they have calcified, as faint high-density spots. Several nodules together can resemble metastases or lymphoma, but their very low signal on gradient echo MRI usually allows the distinction.

== History ==
The splenic nodules were first described at the start of the twentieth century. Charles Gandy (1872–1943) reported them in the spleen of a patient with biliary cirrhosis, and in 1910 similar deposits were noted in the lung of a patient who had died of endocarditis. Because the fibres in the lesions superficially resembled fungal filaments, they were for a time wrongly thought to be caused by a fungal infection. In 1921 Carlos Gamna (1866–1950) examined the spleen of a patient with chronic haemolytic anaemia and showed that the material contained iron and calcium, naming the condition splenogranulomatosi siderotica. The fungal idea was abandoned in the 1930s, and the joint eponym came into general use around 1963.
