= Favre–Racouchot syndrome =

- Other names: Favre–Racouchot disease, and Nodular cutaneous elastosis with cysts and comedones
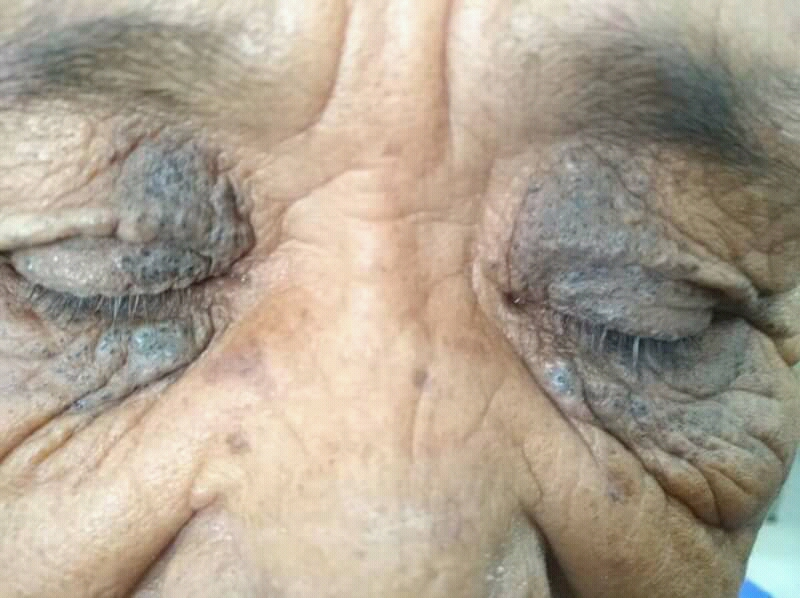
- Affected eyelids and upper cheeks with greyish discolouration.
- Specialty: Dermatology

Favre–Racouchot syndrome is a solar elastotic disorder consisting of multiple open comedones that occurs in skin damaged by sunlight, especially under and lateral of the eyes. The comedones are widened openings for hair follicles and sebaceous glands filled with material.

== Pathology ==
Chronic exposure to ultraviolet light can result in skin thickening as well as elastic destruction of the skin. At least in one instance, the occupational exposure to the UVA light of the sun (UVB is blocked by many car windows) resulted in skin destruction on one side of the face. Microscopically, Favre–Racouchot displays multiple dilated follicular cysts/milia and open comedones with severe solar elastosis in the background dermis.

== Treatment ==
Treatment includes sun protection, and cessation of smoking is highly recommended. Topical retinoids, Isotretinoin, curettage, and dermabrasion have also been used with some success.

== Eponym ==
Favre–Racouchot syndrome is named after the French dermatologist Maurice Favre and his pupil Jean Racouchot (1908–1994). It was described in 1932 by Favre and then reviewed in details by Favre and Racouchot in 1951.

== See also ==
- List of cutaneous conditions
