= Carlos Gamna =

Italian physician

Carlo Gamna (1866–1950) was an Italian physician remembered for Gandy-Gamna nodules and Gamna-Favre bodies.
