= Maurice Favre =

French dermatologist

Maurice Favre (1876–1954) was a French dermatologist who gave his name to Durand-Nicolas-Favre disease, Gamna-Favre bodies and Favre–Racouchot syndrome.
