= Charles Gandy =

French physician

Charles Gandy (April 21, 1872 in Dijon – July 5, 1943 in Paris) was a French physician remembered for Gandy-Gamna nodules.
