= Martha Whitehead =

American politician

Texas State Treasurer
- In office June 14, 1993 – August 31, 1996
- Governor: Ann Richards; George W. Bush
- Preceded by: Kay Bailey Hutchison
- Succeeded by: Office abolished

Personal details
- Born: Martha Frances Hess; 1939 or 1940 (age 86–87)
- Party: Democratic
- Spouse: Roy Laughton Whitehead Jr. (died 2024)
- Children: 3
- Education: Southern Methodist University

Martha Whitehead (born Martha Frances Hess) is an American politician from the U.S. state of Texas. She was the last Texas State Treasurer before the position was abolished by constitutional amendment in 1996.

== Career ==
Whitehead served as the mayor of Longview, Texas from 1991 to 1993. In 1993, Texas Governor Ann Richards appointed Whitehead as Texas State Treasurer, filling the vacancy created when the previous incumbent, Kay Bailey Hutchison was elected to the United States Senate.

=== Texas Treasurer ===
In 1994, Whitehead ran for State Treasurer on a platform of abolishing the office and transferring its few remaining functions to the Texas Comptroller of Public Accounts. In 1995, the Texas Legislature passed a proposed constitutional amendment to abolish the office, which was approved by a majority of voters later that same year. The office was formally dismantled in 1996. On her last day in office, on August 31, 1996, she scraped her name and title off the glass front of the Treasurer's headquarters.

Party political offices
Preceded by Nikki Van Hightower	Democratic nominee for Texas State Treasurer; 1994	Succeeded by office abolished
Political offices
Preceded by Kay Bailey Hutchison	Treasurer of Texas; 1993–1996	Succeeded by office abolished
