= Morris N. Hughes Jr. =

American diplomat

Morris “Rusty” Nelson Hughes Jr. (September 2, 1945 Humboldt, Nebraska – January 9, 2016 Naples, Florida) was an American Career Foreign Service Officer who served as Ambassador Extraordinary and Plenipotentiary to Burundi (1996–1999).,

Hughes graduated from the Loomis School in 1963 and the University of Nebraska in 1967 with a degree in political science. He was a U.S. Marine Corps platoon commander in Vietnam from 1967 to 1969 and received two Purple Hearts, a Bronze Star, and the Navy Commendation Medal, both with Combat V designation.

When he retired from the Foreign Service after 35 years, he had the senior rank of Minister Counselor. Besides the ambassadorship, he served as the Consul General to St. Petersburg, Russia, and as a Diplomat-in-Residence at Tulane University. During a semi-retirement, beginning in 2005, he worked for the Office of Inspector General inspecting US embassies and consulates in Senegal, Mexico, China, Iraq, and Afghanistan.
