= Carl W. A. Groos House (New Braunfels, Texas) =

Historic house in Texas, United States

- U.S. National Register of Historic Places
- Recorded Texas Historic Landmark
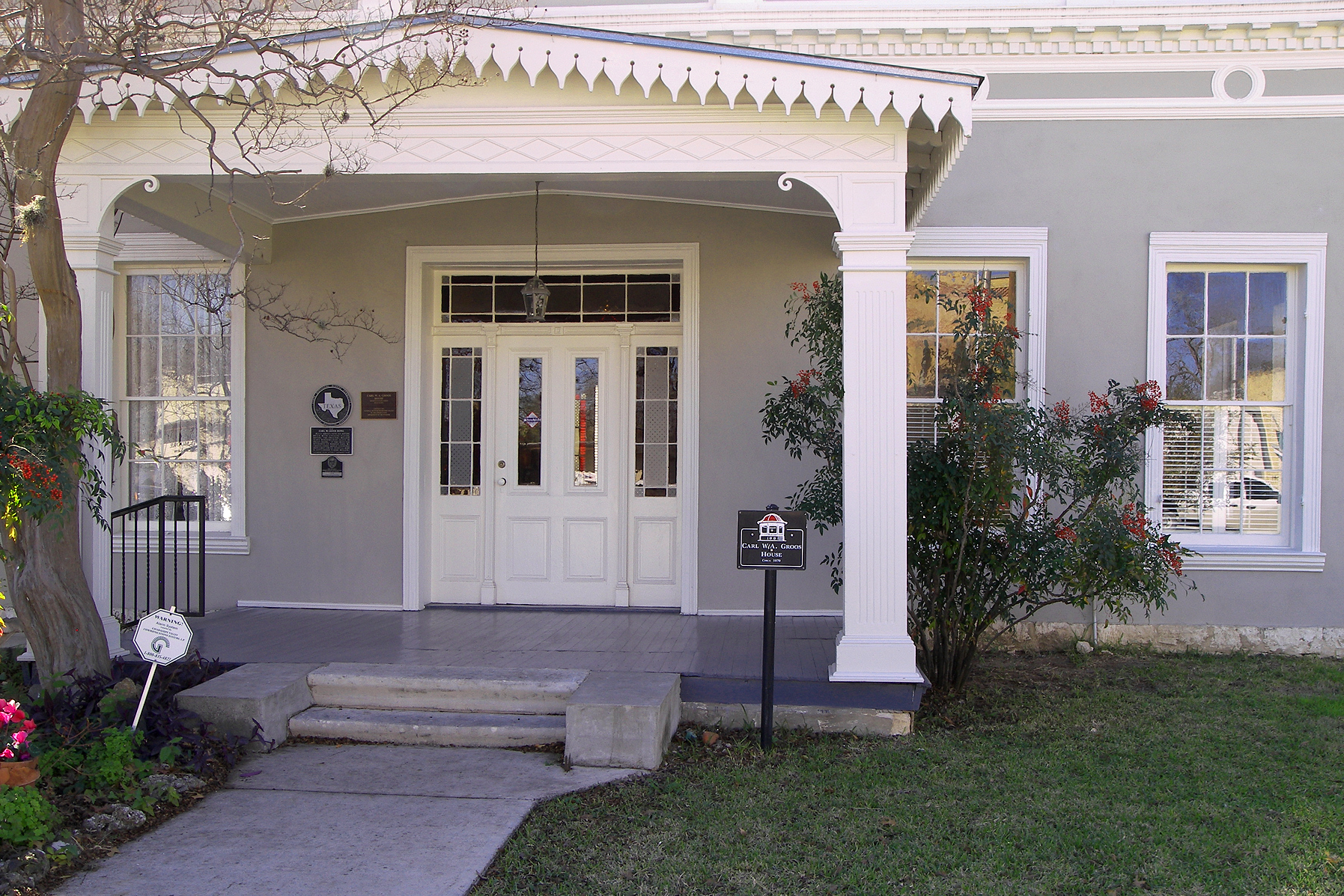
- Groos House in 2012

- Location within Texas Location within the United States
- Location: 228 S. Seguin St., New Braunfels, Texas
- Coordinates: 29°42′4″N 98°7′25″W
- Area: less than one acre
- Built: 1871
- Architectural style: Classical Revival
- NRHP reference No.: 00000884
- RTHL No.: 2286

Significant dates
- Added to NRHP: August 17, 2000
- Designated RTHL: 1968

The Carl W. A. Groos House is located in the city of New Braunfels, county of Comal, in the U.S. state of Texas. It was added to the National Register of Historic Places listings in Comal County, Texas in 2000, and designated a Recorded Texas Historic Landmark in 1968. Groos occupied this house for approximately one year. He moved to San Antonio, and in 1880 had architect Alfred Giles design his home which became known as the Carl Wilhelm August Groos House. Originally owned by one of the early German emigrants to New Braunfels, the house has also remained in the hands of descendants of the early German settlers. Diplomat Bob Krueger used the building for his business office and renovated it in 1999.

== History ==
Carl Wilhelm August Groos (1830–1893) was a Prussian emigrant to Texas in 1848, first in Fayette County and then Gillespie County. In February 1870, Groos purchased a block of land between Seguin and Castell Streets, which consisted of Lot 56 and Lot 72 for $1,900. On May 20, 1870, he married Hulda Amalie Moureau of New Braunfels, and became part of his father-in-law's business. Groos built his New Braunfels home shortly after the wedding. In 1872, Groos moved his family to San Antonio, retaining ownership of the New Braunfels house. In 1879, the house was sold to Gross's sister Emile and her husband New Braunfels’ Mayor Johann Friedrich Adolph Giesecke. A native of Hanover, Germany, Giesecke emigrated to Texas in 1846. The Gieseckes sold the house to local merchant Fritz Scholl, whose family retained ownership until 1946. Scholl was married to the daughter of Julius Rennert, one of the original New Braunfels settlers. Arlon and Faye Krueger, parents of career politician and diplomat Bob Krueger, purchased the house in 1946. Arlon Krueger's grandfather Karl emigrated to Texas in the 19th century. Upon Arlon's death in 1973, the house remained with his immediate family. Bob Krueger (1935–2022) used the building as his business office, and had the building renovated in 1999.

== See also ==
- National Register of Historic Places listings in Comal County, Texas
- Recorded Texas Historic Landmarks in Comal County
