= Carl Wilhelm August Groos House (San Antonio) =

Historic house in Texas, United States

- U.S. Historic district – Contributing property
- Recorded Texas Historic Landmark
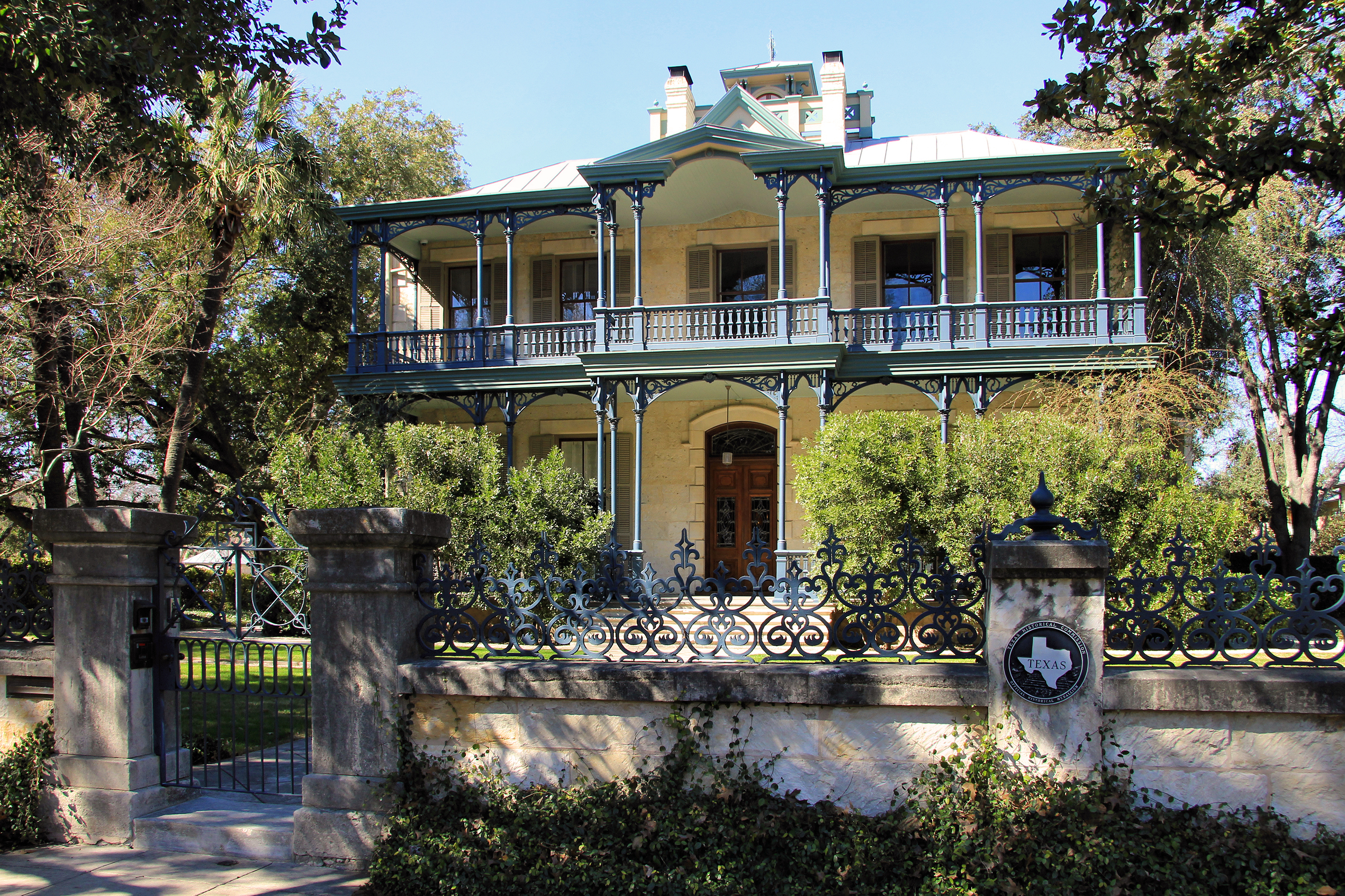
- Groos House in 2014

- Location within Texas Location within the United States
- Location: 335 King William St., San Antonio
- Coordinates: 29°24′52″N 98°29′38″W
- Built: 1880
- Built by: John H. Kampmann
- Architect: Alfred Giles
- Architectural style: Gothic Revival
- Part of: King William Historic District (ID72001349)
- RTHL No.: 2287

Significant dates
- Designated CP: January 20, 1972
- Designated RTHL: 1977

The Carl Wilhelm August Groos House is located in the Bexar County city of San Antonio in the U.S. state of Texas. It was designated a Recorded Texas Historic Landmark in 1977. Designed by Alfred Giles in 1880, the building contractor was John H. Kampmann. Giles used a Victorian Gothic Revival on this limestone home. Groos had immigrated from Germany to Texas in 1848, at which time he and his brothers started a freighting firm. In 1871, he built the Carl W. A. Groos House in New Braunfels. In 1872, he and his family settled in San Antonio. Groos married Hulda Amalie Moureau and became a founding member of the Groos National Bank. In 1880, Groos hired Giles to build his San Antonio home. It is listed on the National Register of Historic Places listings in Bexar County, Texas as a contributing structure of the King William Historic District. Groos died in 1893. In 1957, the house was purchased by the San Antonio Council of the Girl Scouts of the USA. The Girl Scouts sold the home to Charles Butt. It has been restored and is in private ownership.

== See also ==
- National Register of Historic Places listings in Bexar County, Texas
- Recorded Texas Historic Landmarks in Bexar County
