= Kay Bailey Hutchison =

American politician and diplomat

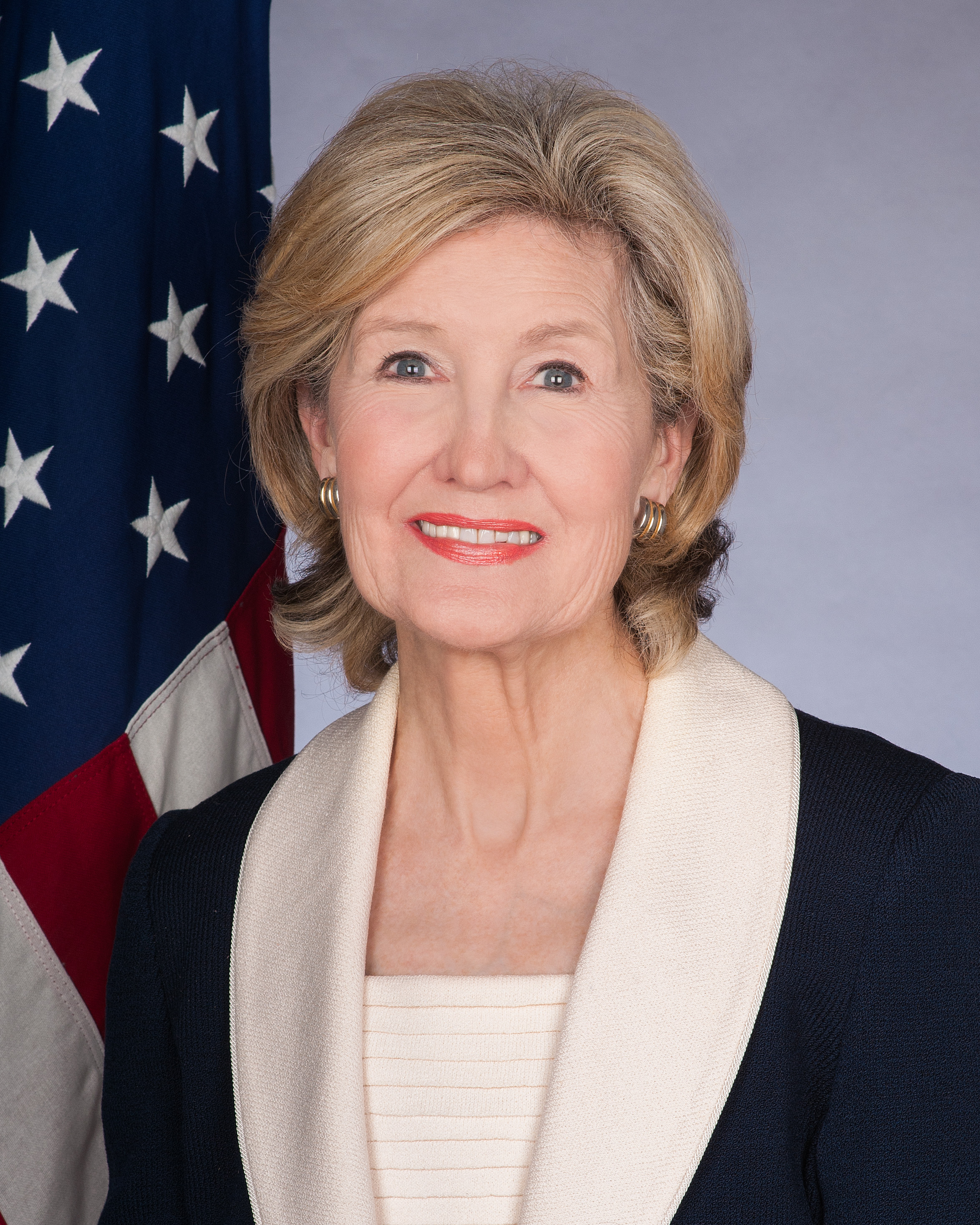
- Official portrait, 2017

24th United States Ambassador to NATO
- In office August 28, 2017 – January 20, 2021
- President: Donald Trump
- Preceded by: Douglas Lute
- Succeeded by: Julianne Smith

United States Senator from Texas
- In office June 14, 1993 – January 3, 2013
- Preceded by: Bob Krueger
- Succeeded by: Ted Cruz

Treasurer of Texas
- In office January 15, 1991 – June 14, 1993
- Governor: Ann Richards
- Preceded by: Ann Richards
- Succeeded by: Martha Whitehead

Member of the National Transportation Safety Board
- In office July 9, 1976 – March 8, 1978
- Appointed by: Gerald Ford
- Preceded by: Isabel Burgess
- Succeeded by: Elwood T. Driver

Member of the Texas House of Representatives from the 90th district
- In office January 9, 1973 – July 9, 1976
- Preceded by: Tom Bass
- Succeeded by: Brad Wright

Personal details
- Born: Kathryn Ann Bailey; July 22, 1943 (age 83) Galveston, Texas, U.S.
- Party: Republican
- Spouses: John Parks (m. 1967; div. 1969); Ray Hutchison (m. 1978; died 2014)
- Children: 4
- Education: University of Texas, Austin (BA, JD)
- Kay Bailey Hutchison's voice Kay Bailey Hutchison's opening statement at her confirmation hearing to be United States ambassador to NATO. Recorded July 20, 2017

Kathryn Ann Bailey Hutchison (née Bailey; July 22, 1943) is an American attorney, television correspondent, politician, and diplomat who served as the 22nd U.S. permanent representative to NATO from 2017 until 2021. A member of the Republican Party, she was a United States senator from Texas from 1993 to 2013.

Born in Galveston, Texas, Hutchison is a graduate of the University of Texas at Austin. Prior to entering politics, she was an attorney and legal correspondent at KPRC-TV in Houston. She was a member of the Texas House of Representatives from 1972 to 1976. After a brief business career, she returned to politics in 1990, when she was elected Texas State Treasurer. In 1993, she was elected to the United States Senate in a non-partisan special election, defeating Democratic incumbent Bob Krueger and becoming the first female senator in Texas history.

After being re-elected to the Senate in 1994, 2000, and 2006, Hutchison was an unsuccessful candidate for Governor of Texas in 2010, losing the Republican primary to incumbent Rick Perry. Hutchison was the most senior female Republican senator by the end of her tenure in 2013, and the fifth most senior female senator overall. In 2013, she joined the law firm Bracewell & Giuliani.

On June 29, 2017, Hutchison was nominated by President Donald Trump to be the next United States Permanent Representative to NATO. She was confirmed by the U.S. Senate in a voice vote on August 3, 2017. She started as ambassador on August 28, 2017. She resigned upon the inauguration of Joe Biden as President.

== Early life ==
Hutchison was born Kathryn Ann Bailey in Galveston, the daughter of Kathryn Ella (née Sharp) and Allan Abner Bailey, Jr., an insurance agent. She has two brothers, Allan and Frank. Hutchison grew up in La Marque, Texas.

She received her Bachelor of Arts degree from the University of Texas at Austin in 1962 (age 19). She was also a member of the Pi Beta Phi Sorority. She received her J.D. degree from the University of Texas School of Law in 1967.

== Early career ==
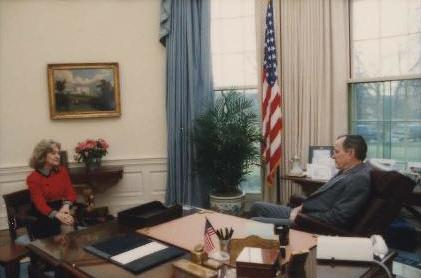
Hutchison with President George H. W. Bush in 1991

Following her graduation from law school, Hutchison was the legal and political correspondent for KPRC-TV in Houston. Hired by Ray Miller, host of the long-running The Eyes of Texas anthology series, Hutchison was among the first on-screen newswomen in Texas.

In 1972, Hutchison was elected to the Texas House of Representatives from a district in Houston. She served until 1976. She was vice-chair of the National Transportation Safety Board from 1976 to 1978. She was a candidate for the United States House of Representatives in 1982 for the Dallas-based 3rd District, but was defeated in the primary by Steve Bartlett. She temporarily left politics and became a bank executive and businesswoman. She was elected Texas State Treasurer in 1990.

=== 1993 indictments and acquittal ===
On June 10, 1993, Travis County authorities, led by Democratic District Attorney Ronnie Earle, raided Hutchison's offices at the State Treasury. The search was conducted without a warrant, as incident to service of the indictments in the case. In September 1993, Hutchison was indicted by a Texas grand jury for official misconduct and records tampering. Hutchison stated that she was the innocent victim of a politically motivated prosecutor. Earle denied that his legal actions against Hutchison were politically motivated. The case against Hutchison was heard before State District Judge John Onion in February 1994. During pre-trial proceedings, the judge did not rule on the admissibility of evidence obtained on June 10. Absent such a ruling, Earle declined to proceed with his case. Onion swore in a jury and directed the jury to acquit Hutchison since Earle chose not to present evidence. The acquittal barred any future prosecution of Hutchison for the same alleged crime.

== United States Senate ==
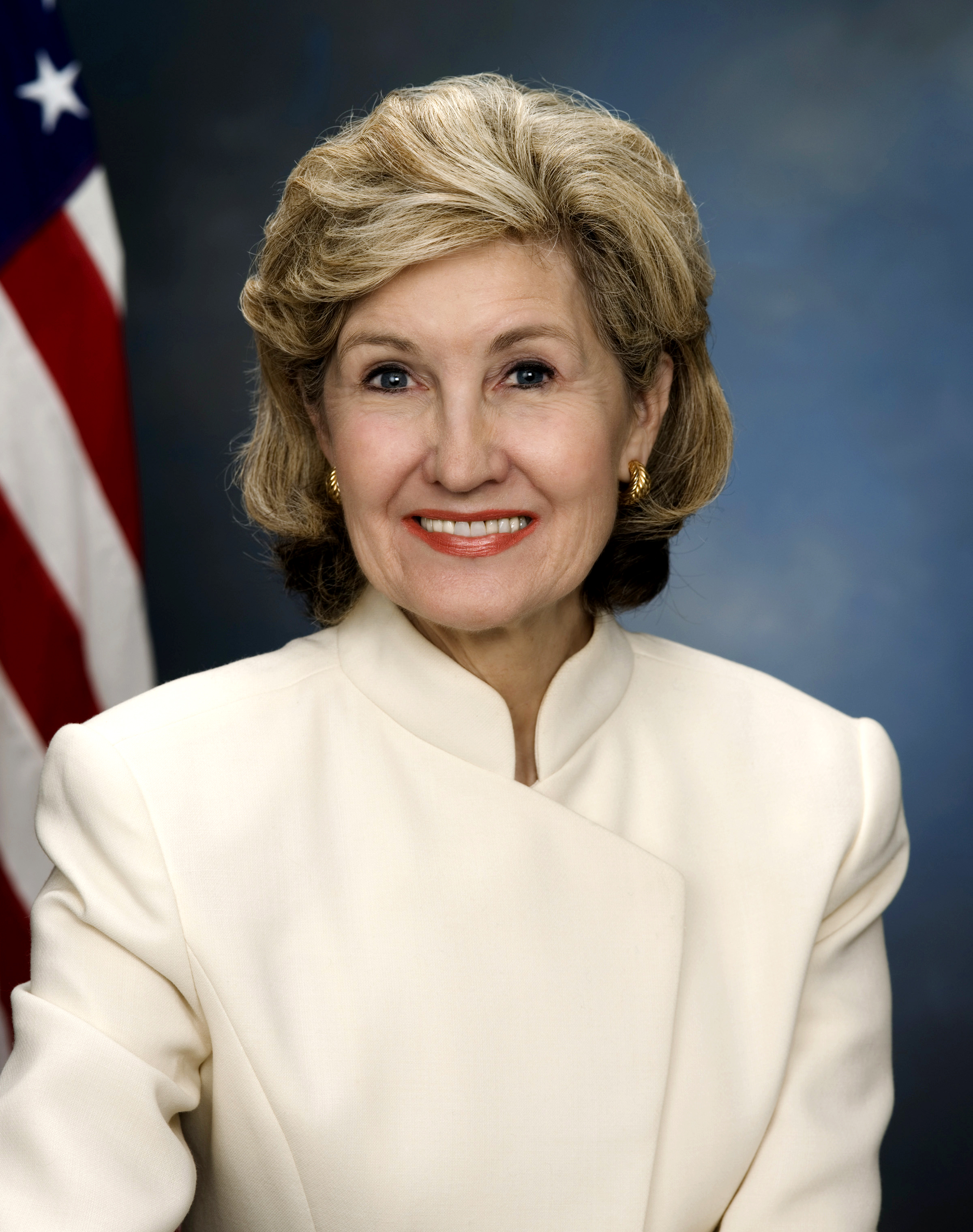
Hutchison's final official portrait in the Senate

=== Caucus memberships ===
- Congressional Oil and Gas Caucus
- Congressional Internet Caucus
- International Conservation Caucus
- Senate Auto Caucus
- Sportsmen's Caucus

=== Elections ===
==== 1993 ====
Hutchison was elected Texas State Treasurer in 1990 and served until June 1993 when she ran against Senator Bob Krueger in a special election to complete the last two years of Lloyd Bentsen's term. Bentsen had resigned in January 1993 to become Secretary of the Treasury in the Clinton administration. Krueger had been appointed by Texas Governor Ann Richards to fill the seat until a replacement was elected.

A field of 24 candidates sought to fill Bentsen's unexpired term in the May 1993 special election. Candidates included incumbent U.S. Representatives Joe Barton and Jack Fields. The top two vote-getters were Hutchison (593,338, or 29 percent) and Krueger (593,239, also 29 percent).

During the campaign Krueger charged that Hutchison was a "country club Republican" and insensitive to the feelings of minorities. In January, the Houston Chronicle reported that both Hutchison and Fields had promised to serve a maximum of two six-year terms in the Senate as part of her support for term-limit legislation for members of Congress. In April, the Dallas Morning News reported that Hutchison had repeated her pledge to serve only two terms in the U.S. Senate, if elected, and had also said term limits ought to cover all senators, including Senator Phil Gramm (Republican), who had been elected in 1984 and re-elected in 1990. (He would stay in the Senate until 2002.) The term-limits legislation never passed, and Hutchison said that she would not leave the Senate in the absence of such legislation, because doing so unilaterally would hurt Texas at the expense of other states in the seniority-driven institution.

After the initial voting, most of the Barton and Fields voters switched to Hutchison, who won the run-off, 1,188,716 (67.3 percent) to 576,538 (32.7 percent). Lower turnout in the run-off resulted in a decrease in Krueger's vote total, by 17,000. Hutchison became the first woman to represent Texas in the U.S. Senate.

==== 1994 ====
Running in 1994 for election to her first full term, Hutchison received 2,604,281 votes (60.8 percent) to 1,639,615 votes (38.3 percent) cast for Democrat Richard W. Fisher, the son-in-law of the late Republican Congressman James M. Collins, who had also run in the 1993 special election.

==== 2000 ====
In 2000, Hutchison defeated Democrat Gene Kelly, with 4,082,091 (65 percent) to 2,030,315 (32.2 percent). She carried 237 of the 254 counties, including one of the most Democratic counties, Webb County (Laredo).

==== 2006 ====
Hutchison's Democratic opponent in the November 2006 general election was former Houston attorney and mediator Barbara Ann Radnofsky (born July 8, 1956), who had not previously run for public office. Radnofsky received 44 percent of the vote in the primary, and won a run-off election against Gene Kelly with 60 percent of the vote.

On election night 2006, Hutchison won re-election to another term, winning 2,661,789 votes (61.7%). Radnofsky won 1,555,202 votes (36.04%).

=== Tenure and political positions ===
Hutchison served on the following Senate committees: Appropriations; Commerce, Science and Transportation; Rules and Administration; Veterans' Affairs. During her time in the Senate, she was a strong supporter of NASA.

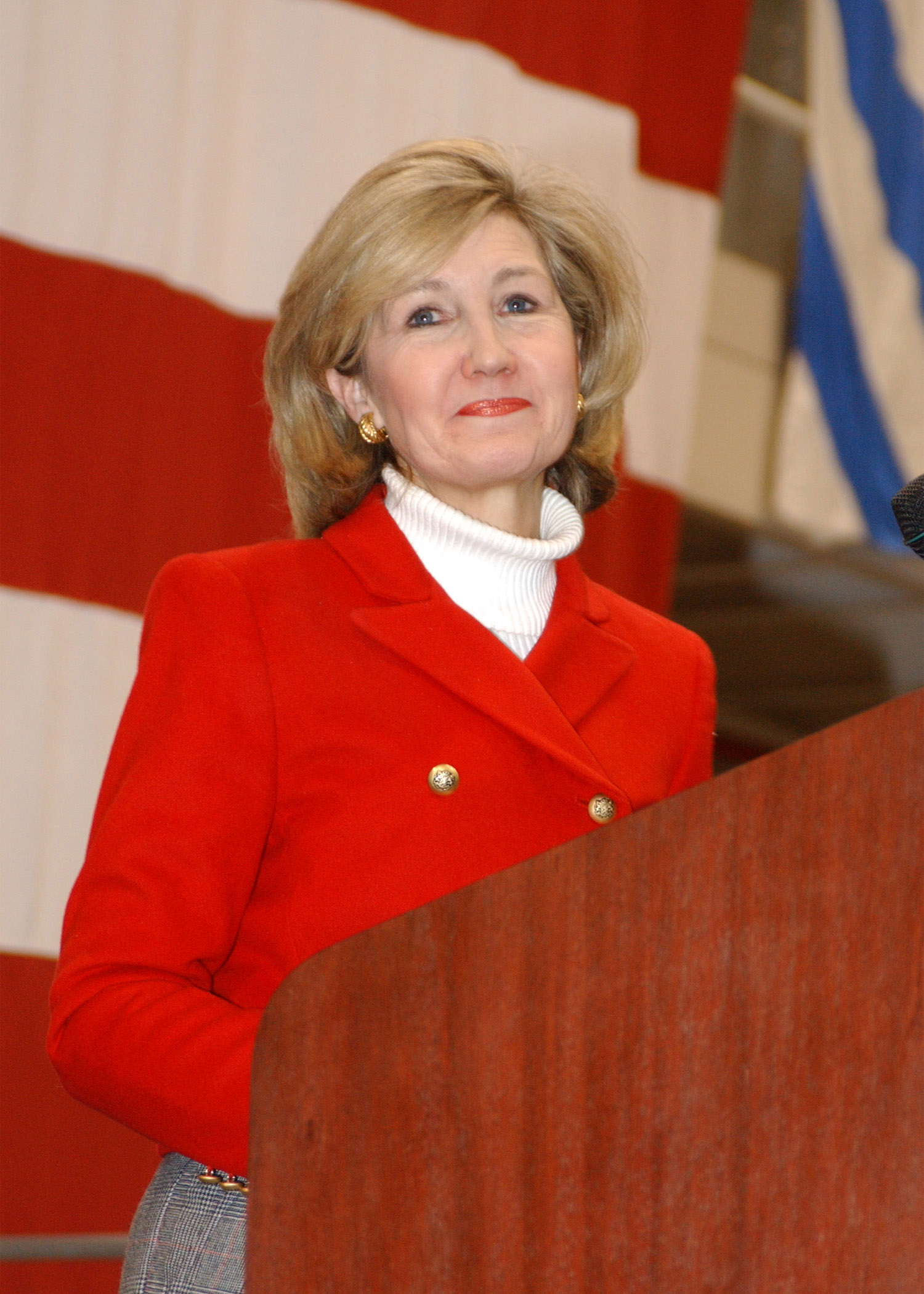
Hutchison speaking

In June 2000, Hutchison and her Senate colleagues co-authored Nine and Counting: The Women of the Senate. In 2004, her book, American Heroines: The Spirited Women Who Shaped Our Country, was published.

From 2001 to 2007, Hutchison served as Vice-Chairwoman of the Senate Republican Conference (caucus), making her the fifth-ranking Republican in the Senate behind Majority Leader Bill Frist, Majority Whip Mitch McConnell and conference chairman Rick Santorum, and Policy Chairman Jon Kyl. In 2007, Hutchison succeeded Jon Kyl as the Policy Chair for Senate Republicans, the fourth-ranking leadership position in the Republican caucus behind Minority Leader McConnell, Minority Whip, and conference chairman Kyl.

The National Journal ranked Hutchison as follows in its 2004 rankings, which are based on various key votes relating to economic policy, social policy, and foreign policy: "Economic: 26% Liberal, 73% Conservative; Social: 38% Liberal, 60% Conservative; Foreign: 0% Liberal, 67% Conservative. In 2012, the National Journal gave her composite scores of 72% conservative and 28% liberal. Although a loyal conservative Republican, she was known to cross over to the other side on a few issues. She was more likely to do this than either Phil Gramm or his successor John Cornyn." A poll that was released on June 19, 2007, showed that Hutchison had an approval rating of 58%, with 34% disapproving.

In 2008, Hutchison was mentioned in an article in The New York Times about the women most likely to become the first female President of the United States. On June 22, 2011, Hutchison told Chris Matthews on Hardball with Chris Matthews that she had pondered running for president, but said she could not run in the 2012 election because of the needs of her two 10-year-old children.

In 2009, Hutchison broke ranks with her Republican colleagues and opposed an attempt to stall the Democrats' health-care bill in the Senate.

Hutchison announced her intention to resign her Senate post in the autumn of 2009 in order to challenge Texas Governor Perry for the Republican Party nomination. State Republican Chairman Cathie Adams later called upon Hutchison to clarify when she would vacate the Senate so that other Republican candidates could make preparations for their races. On November 13, 2009, Hutchison announced that she would not resign from the Senate seat until after the March 2, 2010, primary. On March 31, 2010, she announced her intention to serve out her third term.

Supporters of the Tea Party movement were critical of Hutchison. In 2010, Konni Burton, a member of the Northeast Tarrant Tea Party steering committee, said "She personifies everything that the Tea Party is fighting. She is a Republican, but when you check her votes on many issues, they are not ones that conservatives are happy with."

On January 13, 2011, after some discussion about whether she would change her mind, Hutchison announced she would not seek re-election in 2012.

==== Abortion ====
Hutchison had a mixed voting record on abortion rights.

In 1993, Hutchison, then a candidate for the U.S. Senate, identified as "pro-choice" while supporting restrictions on abortion and received campaign contributions from the WISH List.

In 1994, Hutchison was one of 17 Republicans who broke with their party to vote in favor of a bill, sponsored by Senator Ted Kennedy, to protect access to abortion clinics by making it a federal crime to block or physically attack the clinics. Also, "Hutchison voted for a 2003 resolution in the Senate stating that the Roe decision 'was appropriate and secures an important constitutional right; and such decision should not be overturned.'" She was one of nine Republicans who joined Democrats to support Roe.

Hutchison served as an honorary board member of The WISH List, a pro-abortion rights Republican special interest group. She voted to restrict abortion rights, but said that she did not favor overturning Roe v. Wade. Hutchison also asserted that the Republican Party should not build its platform around abortion, which she calls a "personal and religious issue."

In 2003, Hutchison continued to support abortion rights early in a pregnancy. She said: "I've always said that I think that women should have the ability to make that decision, even if I disagree with it." In June 2004, during the Republican state convention, she told reporters she supported a woman's right to have an abortion early in a pregnancy. She was identified as nominally pro-abortion rights for several years, including 2005–2010.

In 2012, she stated that she identified as "pro-life."

==== DC Personal Protection Act ====
Hutchison proposed the "District of Columbia Personal Protection Act," which drew 31 cosponsors in the U.S. Senate, while drawing 157 cosponsors from the House. This bill repealed the handgun bans the city had in place for thirty years. DC's law stated that one could not possess a rifle or shotgun unless it was in disassembled and inoperative form, and could not possess pistols in any form. In 2008, the law was struck down in a U.S. Supreme Court ruling, District of Columbia v. Heller.

==== DREAM Act and immigration ====
In a letter dated December 9, 2010, Hutchison told some Republicans that she would not support the DREAM Act. Hutchison co-sponsored legislation with Senator Jon Kyl from Arizona to introduce the ACHIEVE Act which they intended to be a compromise proposal. The ACHIEVE Act would not grant a pathway to citizenship; instead it would offer renewable visas to some undocumented immigrants who are Dreamers. Senator Hutchison voted to discontinue funding to 'sanctuary cities,' voted against comprehensive immigration reform, and voted to make English the official language of the United States; she voted against eliminating the 'Y' guest worker visas and voted 'yes' to allowing more foreign workers to work on farms. The American Immigration Lawyers Association, which supports immigration reform, gave her an 80% rating in 2008, and the Federation for American Immigration Reform, which opposes illegal immigration and seeks to reduce legal immigration levels, gave her a 100% rating. Numbers USA, which also opposes illegal and legal immigration, gave her a 76% score.

==== Earmarks and appropriations ====
Hutchison supported the practice of earmarking as a way to bring federal government money to her constituents. Hutchison, through her assignment on the Senate's appropriations committee, has been influential in directing federal funds to projects in her state. In FY 2008 and FY 2009, Hutchison sponsored or co-sponsored 281 earmarks totaling almost $500 million. In an interview with the Austin American-Statesman, Hutchison expressed her pride in the practice as a way to "garner Texans' fair share of their tax dollars."

Hutchison's earmarks and appropriations have been criticized as pork barrel projects or pet projects by the non-partisan government watchdog group Citizens Against Government Waste. CAGW recognized Hutchison's efforts by naming her "Porker of the Month" in October 2009, based on her extensive legislative history, in addition to her request for 149 such pork projects worth $1.6 billion in FY 2010.

==== Embryonic stem-cell research ====
In 2006, Senator Hutchison broke with the majority of Republicans and voted in favor of federal funding for embryonic stem-cell research. Hutchison had also signed a letter addressed to President Bush, co-signed by 12 other Republicans, in support of stem cell research in 2001.

==== Environmental record ====
In 2005, Hutchison voted against prohibiting oil leasing in Alaska's Arctic National Wildlife Refuge, and has supported legislation promoting drilling in the refuge in 2002 and 2003. In 2005 she also voted against including oil and gas smokestacks in the Environmental Protection Agency's mercury regulations. In 1999, she voted to remove funding for renewable and solar energy, although she has more recently stated she supports the development of alternative energy sources.

==== Financial reform ====
Hutchison voted for Senate Republican amendments to the financial reform bill before eventually voting against HR 4173, the Dodd–Frank Wall Street Reform and Consumer Protection Act, on May 20, 2010.

Hutchison voted for the Emergency Economic Stabilization Act of 2008, which authorized the creation of the Troubled Assets Relief Program.

==== Health care ====
Hutchison voted against the passage of the Affordable Care Act (also known as Obamacare). However, Hutchison broke ranks with her Republican colleagues and opposed an attempt to stall the Democrats' health-care bill in the Senate. She was one of three Republican Senators to oppose the filibuster attempt. Hutchison was joined by Republican Senators Susan Collins and Olympia Snowe of Maine. Hutchison was also one of 16 Republican Senators who voted with Democrats to pass the Children Health Insurance Program.

==== LGBT rights ====
Hutchison voted in favor of the Hate Crimes Enhancement Act, which includes sexual orientation, and she co-sponsored the Ryan Act to fund HIV/AIDS services; however, she voted against domestic partnerships in the District of Columbia. In 2004 and 2006, she voted for the Federal Marriage Amendment which was a proposed constitutional amendment to ban same-sex marriage. She voted against later legislation expanding hate crime definitions to include sexual orientation, but did vote against banning affirmative action for federal contractors. In 2009, Hutchison's gubernatorial campaign said she was opposed to same-sex marriage. In 1996, Hutchison voted for the Defense of Marriage Act banning federal benefits for same-sex marriages. Also in 2009, Hutchison voted for a Defense spending bill that included penalties for people who harm others based on sexual orientation as well as for the 2012 Reauthorizing the Violence Against Women Act which stated that all organizations receiving funds cannot discriminate on the basis of sexual orientation. In 2010, Hutchison voted against repealing Don't Ask Don't Tell.

==== Taxes ====
Hutchison generally favored tax cuts. In 1999, Hutchison supported the "council-led tax cuts" in Washington D.C. Later, in 2001, Hutchison successfully offered a measure to return "$69 billion to the tax cut for marriage penalty relief."

== 2010 gubernatorial election ==
On August 17, 2009, Hutchison formally announced that she was a Republican candidate for Governor of Texas and positioned herself as a moderate alternative to Governor Rick Perry. Perry criticized Hutchison for her pro-abortion rights position and received endorsements from social conservatives in the state. Although Hutchison led Perry in polls taken in early 2009 and was perceived by many to be the front-runner in the race, by the fall her lead had evaporated and she consistently trailed the incumbent in the final months before the primary. Hutchison accumulated a list of high-profile endorsements that included former U.S. President George H. W. Bush, former U.S. Secretary of State James Baker, former U.S. Vice President Dick Cheney, Hall of Fame baseball player Nolan Ryan, and several current and former congressmen and Cabinet secretaries. However, Hutchison lost the primary to Perry, 31 to 53 percent, with the remainder of the vote going to Debra Medina, a dark horse candidate with ties to the Tea Party movement.

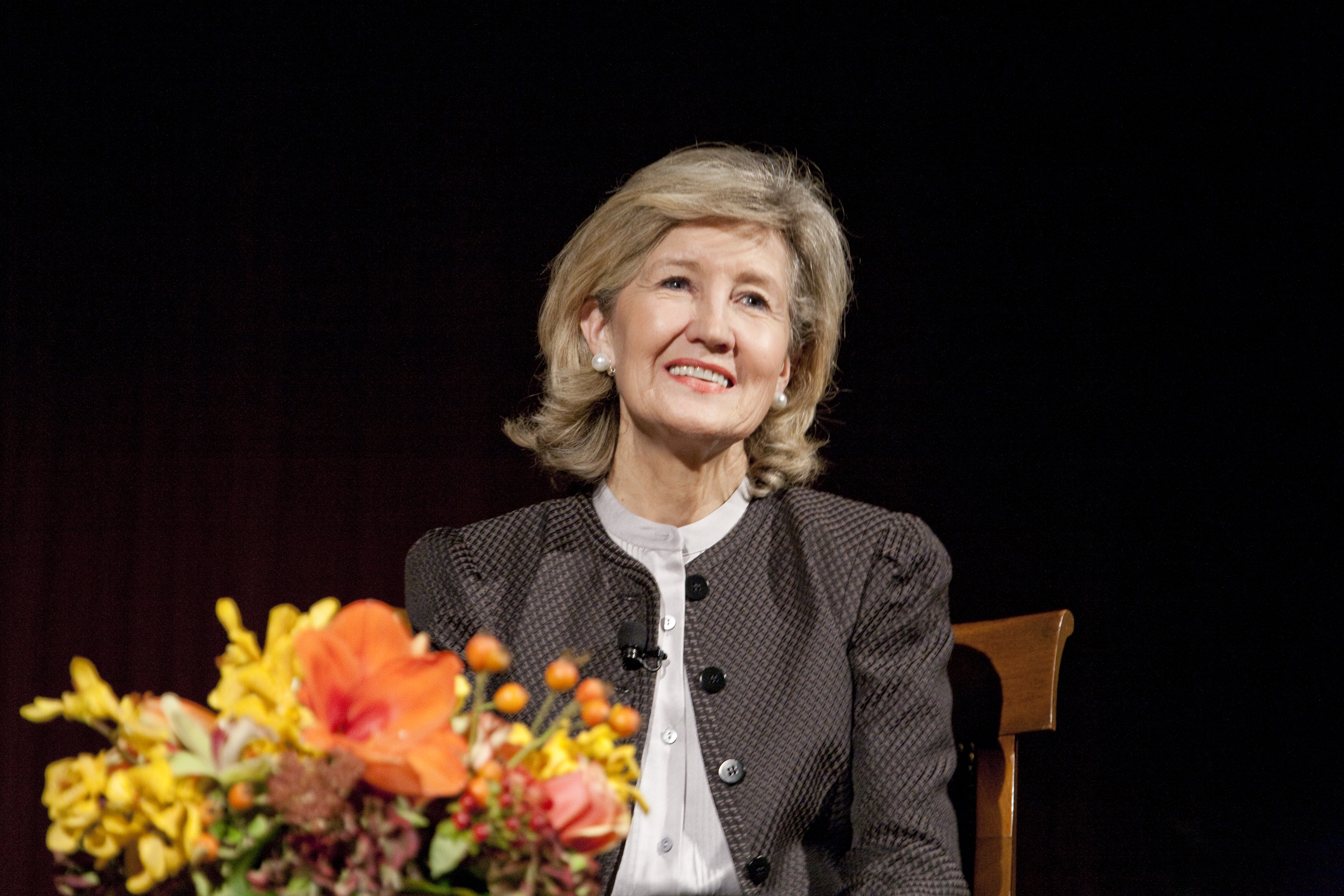
Kay Bailey Hutchison at the LBJ Presidential Library.

== United States Ambassador to NATO ==
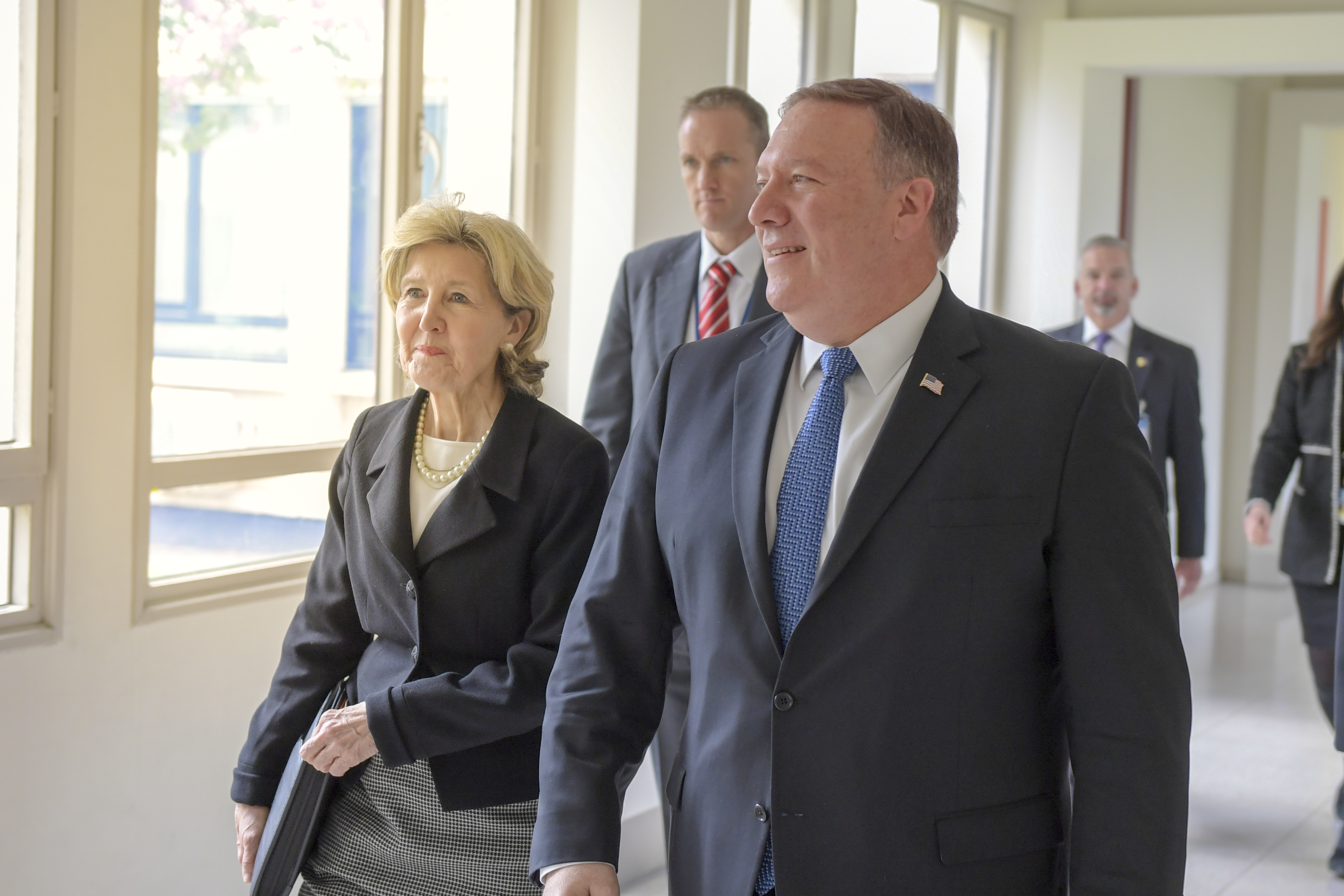
Hutchison walks with Secretary of State Mike Pompeo at NATO Headquarters in Brussels

On June 29, 2017, Hutchison was nominated by President Donald Trump to be the United States Permanent Representative to NATO. The U.S. Senate confirmed her nomination by voice vote on August 3. Hutchison was sworn in on August 15 and started the position on August 28.

On October 2, 2018, Hutchison suggested NATO would consider destroying Russian medium-range nuclear systems if Russia continued development on those systems, which would be an act of war under international law.

Hutchison served as the U.S. Permanent Representative to NATO until 2021.

== Honors ==
In 2013, during the 113th United States Congress, the House of Representatives passed a bill to rename IRC section 219(c) as the Kay Bailey Hutchison Spousal IRA. On July 25, 2013, the bill became Public Law 113-22.

Also in 2013, the Dallas Convention Center was renamed the Kay Bailey Hutchison Convention Center.

== Personal life ==
Hutchison married her first husband, John Pierce Parks, a medical student, on April 8, 1967; they divorced in 1969.

Hutchison married her second husband, Ray Hutchison, in Dallas on March 16, 1978. They had a son and a daughter, both adopted in 2001. Ray Hutchison was an attorney who served as a Republican in the Texas House of Representatives from 1973 to 1977 and as the chairman of the Texas Republican Party from 1976 to 1977. He died on March 30, 2014 at the age of 81.

As of 2009, Hutchison and her family made their primary residence in Dallas. She owned a second house in Virginia during her Senate tenure.

Hutchison is an Episcopalian. She is a member of the Church of the Incarnation, a congregation of The Episcopal Church.

== Electoral history ==
Texas Senator (Class I): Results 1988–2006
Year	Democrat	Votes	Pct	Republican	Votes	Pct	3rd Party	Party	Votes	Pct	4th Party	Party	Votes	Pct
1993	Bob Krueger	576,538	33%	Kay Bailey Hutchison	1,188,716	67%								
1994	Richard W. Fisher	1,639,615	38%	Kay Bailey Hutchison	2,604,218	61%	Pierre Blondeau	Libertarian	36,107	1%				
2000	Gene Kelly	2,025,024	32%	Kay Bailey Hutchison	4,078,954	65%	Douglas Sandage	Green	91,329	1%	Mary Ruwart	Libertarian	72,657	1%
2006	Barbara Ann Radnofsky	1,555,202	36%	Kay Bailey Hutchison	2,661,789	62%	Scott Jameson	Libertarian	97,672	2%				

*Lloyd Bentsen resigned his seat to become Secretary of the Treasury; Hutchison won the run-off special election in 1993 to fill out the remainder of his term.

Party political offices
Vacant Title last held by Allen Clark; 1982	Republican nominee for Treasurer of Texas; 1990	Succeeded by David Hartman
Preceded by Beau Boulter	Republican nominee for U.S. Senator from Texas (Class 1); 1993, 1994, 2000, 2006	Succeeded by Ted Cruz
Preceded by Larry Craig	Chair of the Senate Republican Steering Committee; 1996–1997	Succeeded by Phil Gramm
Preceded by Paul Coverdell as Secretary of the Senate Republican Conference	Vice Chair of the Senate Republican Conference; 2001–2007	Succeeded by John Cornyn
Preceded by Jon Kyl	Chair of the Senate Republican Policy Committee; 2007–2009	Succeeded by John Ensign
Political offices
Preceded by Ann Richards	Treasurer of Texas; 1991–1993	Succeeded by Martha Whitehead
U.S. Senate
Preceded by Bob Krueger	U.S. Senator (Class 1) from Texas; 1993–2013; Served alongside: Phil Gramm, John Cornyn	Succeeded by Ted Cruz
Preceded by Ted Stevens	Ranking Member of the Senate Commerce Committee; 2008–2013	Succeeded by John Thune
Diplomatic posts
Preceded by Douglas Lute	United States Permanent Representative to NATO; 2017–2021	Succeeded by Douglas Jones; Chargé d'Affaires
U.S. order of precedence (ceremonial)
Preceded by Pat Roberts as Former U.S. Senator	Order of precedence of the United States as Former U.S. Senator	Succeeded by Frank Murkowski as Former U.S. Senator
