= Texas State Treasurer =

Former elected position in the Texas state government

- Government of Texas
- Style: "Treasurer"
- Seat: Austin, Texas
- Nominator: Governor of Texas
- Appointer: Governor of Texas
- Formation: 1878
- First holder: Francis Lubbock
- Final holder: Martha Whitehead
- Abolished: August 31, 1996

Texas State Treasurer was an elected constitutional officer in the executive branch of the state government of Texas, responsible for overseeing the financial operations of state government. The position was established in the Constitution of 1876. It was officially abolished on August 31, 1996.

== History ==
The office of State Treasurer superseded a similar office in the Republic of Texas. The Treasurer had a four-year term as head of the State Treasury Department. Duties were divided between the State Treasurer and the Texas Comptroller of Public Accounts. Over time, the Texas Legislature transferred most of the Treasurer's functions to the Comptroller's office.

The last State Treasurer, Martha Whitehead, successfully campaigned for office in 1994 on the premise of abolishing the position and transferring its few remaining duties to the Comptroller's office. Detractors to Whitehead's plan, including Republican opponent David Hartman, favored expanding the Treasury by having it assume the duties of several other state agencies, including the Public Finance Authority and the Pension Review Board, possibly saving more money. Whitehead said in the event voters kept the office open she would have served the whole four-year term. Whitehead, a Democrat, won by a narrow margin—50.29 percent to Hartman's 49.7 percent of 4,145,981 votes cast statewide. Whitehead successfully campaigned the Legislature for a constitutional amendment in 1995 to formally abolish the Treasurer's office, which was approved by voters in November of that year. By 1996, the Comptroller had taken over the Treasurer's few remaining duties, and the treasury department was formally permanently closed on August 31, 1996.

== Organization ==
The major duties of the office were to receive and keep state money, maintain accounts of all receipts and expenditures, collect cigarette and tobacco taxes and certain gross-receipts taxes, serve as custodian of securities in trust, receive unclaimed property held in trust, and administer money in a local government-investment pool called TexPool. Additionally, the treasurer acted as chairman of the State Depository Board and the Cash Management Committee, officer of the Treasury Safekeeping Trust Company, and member of the State Banking Board and Bond Review Board.

The State Treasury Department had two divisions: fiscal management and administration. Within the fiscal management area the Fiscal Operations Division processes checks from state agencies and state warrants. The State Depository Board approved Texas financial institutions to function as state depositories and establishes interest rates on state time deposits. The Treasury Safekeeping Trust Company kept several billion dollars in securities owned by state agencies and the treasury. Unclaimed money from dormant bank accounts, insurance benefits, corporate dividends, and mineral proceeds, for example, were handled through the Unclaimed Property Division, which the treasury used to locate missing owners.

The administrative divisions of the treasury provided computer operations, legal support, and the sale and distribution of cigarette and alcoholic beverage stamps. The Cash Flow Estimating Division forecasted state expenditures and revenue. The Rapid Deposit Program developed efficient cash-management programs. A system called TEXNET, begun in 1990, was designed to receive and process large taxpayer payments electronically to hasten interest earnings.

In 1990 approximately 260 employees worked in the State Treasury Department, which had an operating budget of more than $21 million. The treasury processed more than 34,000 checks a day from state agencies and earned more than $300 million in interest during the fiscal year.

== Notable Texas State Treasurers ==
Some notable former state treasurers in Texas include:

- Francis Lubbock (1878–1891)
- W. Gregory Hatcher (1925–1931)
- Charley Lockhart (1931–1941)
- Jesse James (1941–1977)
- Warren G. Harding (1977–1983)
- Ann Richards (1983–1991)
- Kay Bailey Hutchison (1991–1993)
- Martha Whitehead (1993–1996)
