= Mary Rogers (disambiguation) =

Mary Rogers (c. 1820–1841) was a New York murder victim.

Mary Rogers may also refer to:

- Mary Rogers (artist) (1882–1920), American painter and sculptor
- Mary Huttleston Rogers, birth name of Mary (Mai) Huttleston Rogers Coe (1875–1924), American heiress and horticulturist; wife of businessman William Robertson Coe
- Mary Joseph Rogers (1882–1955), founder of the Maryknoll Sisters
- Mary Millicent Abigail Rogers, full name of Millicent Rogers (1902–1953), American socialite, heiress, fashion icon, jewelry designer, and art collector
- Mary Rogers Gregory (1846–1919), American artist
- Mary Rogers Miller (1868–1971), American writer, naturalist, and educator
- Mary Rogers (murderer) (1883–1905), last woman legally executed by Vermont
- Mary Rogers (politician) (1872–1932), first woman elected to local government in Victoria, Australia
- Mary Rogers Williams (1857–1907), American tonalist and Impressionist artist
- Mary Beth Rogers (born 1940), American writer

== See also ==
- Mary Rodgers (1931–2014), American composer and author
- Mary Rodgers (biomechanist), American biomechanist and physical therapist
- Mary Rogers Kimball House
