= Jack Rains =

American politician (1937–2023)

Secretary of State of Texas
- In office 1987–1989
- Preceded by: Myra McDaniel
- Succeeded by: George Bayoud

Personal details
- Born: November 23, 1937
- Died: July 5, 2023 (aged 85)

Jack Morris Rains (November 23, 1937 – July 5, 2023) was an American attorney in Houston, Texas, who was the 95th Secretary of State of Texas, having served from 1987 to 1989. He left the position to contest unsuccessfully for the Republican gubernatorial nomination in 1990. He lost to businessman Clayton W. Williams, Jr., of Midland, who was then narrowly defeated in the general election by the Democrat Ann Willis Richards, then the state treasurer. Other candidates in the field with Rains and Williams were Kent Hance, a former congressman and previously a Democrat, and Tom Luce, a Dallas lawyer.

Rains died on July 5, 2023, at the age of 85.

Political offices
Preceded by Myra McDaniel	Secretary of State of Texas; 1987–1989	Succeeded by George Bayoud
