= 1990 Texas gubernatorial election =

- November 6, 1990
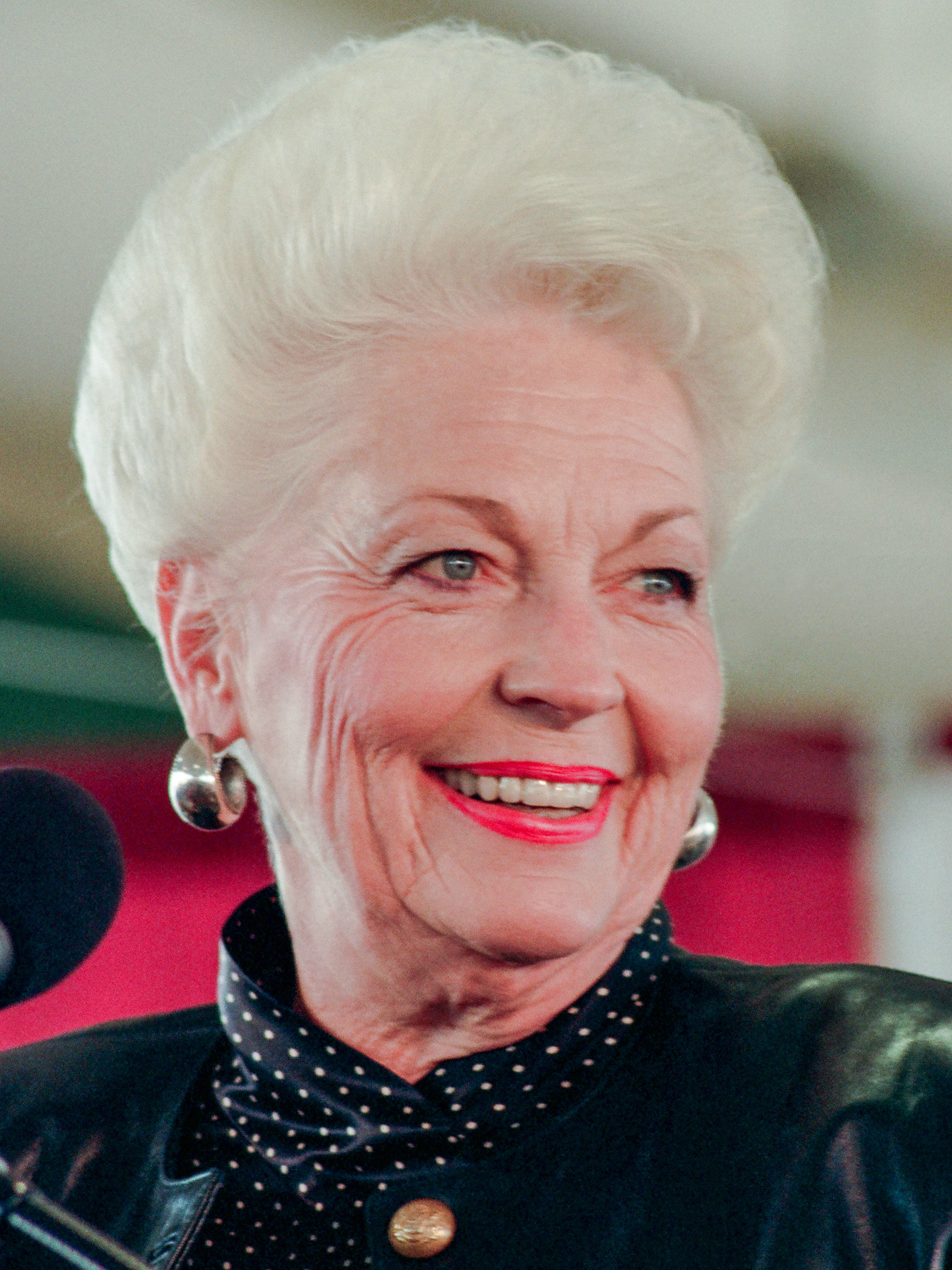

Nominee	Ann Richards	Clayton Williams
Party	Democratic	Republican
Popular vote	1,925,670	1,826,431
Percentage	49.47%	46.92%
- County results Richards: 40–50% 50–60% 60–70% 70–80% 80–90% Williams: 40–50% 50–60% 60–70% 70–80%
Governor before election
Bill Clements
Republican
Elected Governor
Ann Richards
Democratic

The 1990 Texas gubernatorial election was held on November 6, 1990, to elect the governor of Texas. Incumbent Republican governor Bill Clements did not run for re-election, so the election pitted Democrat Ann Richards against Republican Clayton Williams. Richards narrowly defeated Williams on Election Day, winning 49.5% of the vote to Williams' 46.9%.

As of 2026, this is also the most recent time the Democratic candidate has carried Collingsworth, Childress, Wilbarger, Wichita, Archer, Throckmorton, Montague, Wise, Grayson, Lamar, Hopkins, Titus, Bowie, Harrison, Panola, Shelby, Jasper, Hardin, Angelina, Polk, Houston, Madison, Walker, Kaufman, Navarro, Henderson, Hill, McLennan, Burleson, Waller, and Refugio counties. The counties of Tarrant and Williamson would not vote for a Democrat for governor again until 2026. This is also the most recent Texas gubernatorial election in which both major parties' nominees have since died, and the last won by a Democrat and a woman until 2026.

== Republican primary ==
=== Candidates ===
- Clayton Williams, Midland oil and gas businessman
- Kent Hance, Railroad Commissioner, former Democratic U.S. representative from Lubbock, and candidate in 1986
- Tom Luce, attorney and advisor to H. Ross Perot
- Jack Rains, Houston attorney and former secretary of state (1987–1989)
- W.N. Otwell
- Royce Owens
- Ed Cude

==== Declined ====
- George W. Bush, son of President George H. W. Bush and part-owner of the Texas Rangers
- T. Boone Pickens, billionaire oilman and corporate takeover specialist

T. Boone Pickens, CEO of Mesa Petroleum in Amarillo, was considered a likely candidate for much of 1989. However, on August 30, 1989, Pickens announced at a luncheon in Dallas that he would not run for the governorship in 1990. But Pickens, who also announced he would be relocating from Amarillo to Dallas, said he would consider a run for the governorship in 1994.

George W. Bush, who had just become part owner of the Texas Rangers baseball club, also declined to run for governor after briefly exploring a run for the governorship in 1990. He did so on the advice of his mother.

=== Debate ===
1990 Texas gubernatorial election republican primary debate
No.	Date	Host	Moderator	Link	Republican	Republican	Republican	Republican
Key: P Participant A Absent N Not invited I Invited W Withdrawn small>								
Key: P Participant A Absent N Not invited I Invited W Withdrawn small>					Kent Hance	Tom Luce	Jack Rains	Clayton Williams
1	Feb. 8, 1990	Harris County Republican Party; Houston Chronicle	George W. Bush	C-SPAN	P	P	P	P

=== Results ===
Republican primary results
Party	Candidate	Votes	%
Republican	Clayton Williams	520,014	60.80
Republican	Kent Hance	132,142	14.35
Republican	Tom Luce	115,835	13.54
Republican	Jack Rains	82,461	9.64
Republican	W. N. Otwell	2,310	0.27
Republican	Royce X. Owens	1,392	0.16
Republican	Ed Cude	1,077	0.13
Total votes		855,231	100.00

== Democratic primary ==
Results of the Democratic primary by county Richards: 30–40%; 40–50%; 50–60%; 60–70%; Mattox: 30–40%; 40–50%; 50–60%; 60–70%; White: 30–40%

Results of the Democratic runoff primary by county Richards: 50–60%; 60–70%; 70–80%; Mattox: 50–60%; 60–70%; 70–80%

=== Candidates ===
- Ann Richards, Texas State Treasurer
- Jim Mattox, Texas Attorney General and former U.S. representative
- Mark White, former governor (1983–1987)
- Theresa Hearn-Haynes
- Earl Holmes
- Stanley Adams
- Ray Rachal

=== Debate ===
1990 Texas gubernatorial election democratic primary debate
No.	Date	Host	Moderator	Link	Democratic	Democratic	Democratic
Key: P Participant A Absent N Not invited I Invited W Withdrawn							
Key: P Participant A Absent N Not invited I Invited W Withdrawn					Jim Mattox	Ann Richards	Mark White
1	Feb. 7, 1990	Harris County Democratic Party; Houston Chronicle	Henry Cisneros	C-SPAN	P	P	P

=== Results ===
Richards and Mattox came very close to each other in the first round of the primary, with Richards securing the first place by just 0.29% of the vote. She performed the best in Travis County, of which Austin, the capital of Texas, is the county seat. In contrast, Mattox showed his best results in several counties in northern portion of the state. He repeated this feat in the runoff election, but ceded ground significantly across the state to Richards, who beat him by 14.18% of the vote.

Democratic primary results
Party	Candidate	Votes	%
Democratic	Ann Richards	580,191	39.01
Democratic	Jim Mattox	546,103	38.72
Democratic	Mark White	288,161	19.38
Democratic	Theresa Hearn-Haynes	31,395	2.11
Democratic	Earl Holmes	17,904	1.20
Democratic	Stanley Adams	16,118	1.08
Democratic	Ray Rachal	9,388	0.63
Total votes		1,487,734	100.00

=== Runoff ===
Democratic primary runoff results
Party	Candidate	Votes	%
Democratic	Ann Richards	640,995	57.09
Democratic	Jim Mattox	481,739	42.91
Total votes		1,122,734	100.00

== General election ==
=== Campaign ===
Williams handily won the Republican primary. Williams's vote total exceeded that of his nearest challenger, former Congressman and soon-to-be-former Railroad Commissioner Kent Hance by more than 45 percentage points. Meanwhile, Democrat Ann Richards placed first in a six-person primary that included Texas Attorney General Jim Mattox and former governor Mark White, the latter of whom sought to return to the governor's mansion four years after losing his bid to remain Governor of Texas.

Williams spent freely from his personal fortune, running a "Good Old Boy" campaign initially appealing to conservatives. Prior to a series of gaffes, he was leading Richards (the race was dubbed "Claytie vs. The Lady") in the polls and was in striking distance of becoming only the second Republican governor of Texas since Reconstruction. Meanwhile, Libertarian nominee Jeff Daiell was launching a TV campaign which, combined with personal appearances across Texas, boosted him to a showing of 129,128 votes. His drawing power made Richards the first Texas governor in many years elected without a majority.

In one of his widely publicized missteps, Williams refused to shake hands with Ann Richards in a public debate, an act seen as uncouth. Earlier, Williams made an infamous joke to reporters, likening bad weather to rape, having quipped: "If it's inevitable, just relax and enjoy it". In addition, it has been claimed that as an undergraduate at Texas A&M, he had participated in visits to the Chicken Ranch, a well-known Texas brothel in La Grange, and the Boy's Towns of Mexico. As a result of his reported comments, Williams was occasionally parodied, such as in the mock political ad, "Satan Williams", which appeared on Dallas/Fort Worth public television during the 1990 campaign season. Richards was sworn-in as the 45th governor of Texas on January 15, 1991.

=== Results ===
General election results
Party	Candidate	Votes	%
Democratic	Ann Richards	1,925,670	49.47%
Republican	Clayton Williams	1,826,431	46.92%
Libertarian	Jeff Daiell	129,128	3.32%
Total votes		3,881,229	100.00%
Democratic gain from Republican			
