= Spirit of Texas =

Helicopter that traveled around the world

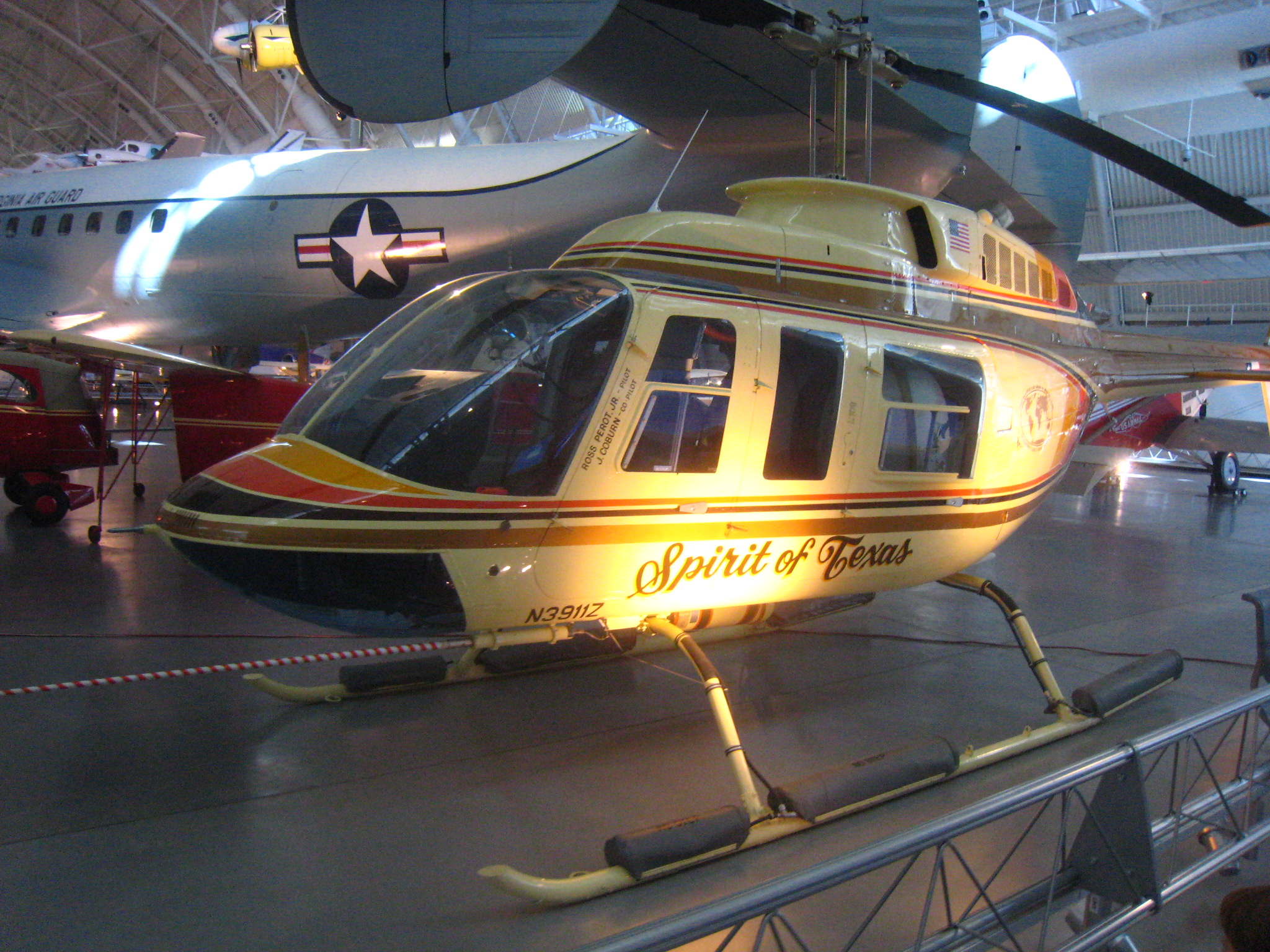
- Spirit of Texas

General information
- Type: Bell 206L-1 LongRanger II
- Manufacturer: Bell Helicopter
- Status: Retired
- Owners: Ross Perot Jr.
- Registration: N3911Z
- Total distance: 26,000 miles

History
- First flight: 1982
- Preserved at: National Air and Space Museum's Steven F. Udvar-Hazy Center

The Spirit of Texas, a Bell 206L-1 LongRanger II, is the first helicopter to complete a round-the world flight.

== History ==
A standard business class Bell 206L-1 LongRanger was modified for the round-the-world trip. Modifications took 3 weeks. An extra 151 gallon fuel tank was added, along with a Loral radar, a modified heater/defroster, pop out floats, special safety, communication, and navigation equipment.

Ross Perot, Jr. and Jay Coburn used the Spirit of Texas to complete the first round-the-world flight by helicopter. An Australian, Dick Smith, had started the first round the world solo 'around the world' flight in a JetRanger helicopter on August 6, 1982, from Dallas, Texas and successfully completed on July 22 1983. Determined to accomplish the task earlier, Perot and Coburn set out on an aggressive timetable with better funding. In a single day, a LongRanger was ordered and delivered at a cost of $725,000 (1982). Fellow pilot Coburn had extensive helicopter experience in Vietnam, and had participated in the rescue of 2 EDS employees from a jail in Iran as depicted by Ken Follet's non-fiction novel On Wings of Eagles.

The helicopter departed Dallas, Texas, on September 1, 1982, and returned to the same point 29 days, 3 hours, and 8 minutes later. Smith completed his solo flight in July the following year. The flight path consisted of 26,000 miles crossing 26 different countries. 56,000 pounds of fuel were burned, with 56 stops for refueling.

One stop was on an American President Lines container ship SS President McKinley in the North Pacific because the Soviet Union would not authorize refueling stops. Perot's father, Ross Perot Sr., and his advisor Tom Luce arranged the ship while the flight was underway, with only two weeks notice. The container ship landing was in 15 foot seas, with 40 knot winds.

The flight consisted of 246.5 hours of flight time at an average ground speed of 117 mph. It set a FAI world record for round the world flight time in a helicopter, averaging 35.4 mph. Fog necessitated flying as low as 10 feet to follow roads. There were two incidents in India and Burma of being cited for unauthorized landings. There were no major mechanical problems in flight.

On November 15, 1982, the Spirit of Texas was flown to Andrews Air Force Base, and donated to the National Air and Space Museum.

== Route ==
An 11-man crew in a C-130 Hercules flew ahead of the aircraft for ground support and fueling.

The route included stops in some of the following locations.

- Dallas, Texas
- Montreal, Canada
- Sept-Îles, Canada - Poor weather required flying along the St. Laurence river and under bridges.
- Quaqtaq, Canada (referred to as Koratac reservation) - Emergency landing for fuel.
- Sonderstorm AFB, Greenland
- Kulusuk, Greenland - They were refused a clearance to land with controllers leaving to go hunting, and diverted to Angmagssalik, Greenland
- Sumburgh, Shetland Islands - Arm wrestling Championships at rest stop.
- London, England - Overtook Dick Smith's Helicopter.
- Marseille, France
- Naples, Italy
- Athens, Greece
- Cairo, Egypt
- Luxor, Egypt - Unscheduled fuel stop with Army surcharges.
- Jidda
- Bahrain
- Muscat
- Karachi, Pakistan - Abandoned maps and claimed they were lost to explain route deviation.
- Delhi, India
- Calcutta, India
- Rangoon, Burma - Thunderstorms
- Mergui, Burma Interrogations on landing.
- Clark Air Base, Philippines - Had to launch before Typhoon Ken.
- Taipei, Taiwan
- Kagoshima, Japan
- Fukuoka, Japan
- Kushiro, Japan -departed for a 750-mile trip in Typhoon Ken.
- Container Ship McKinley - slight damage to Helicopter, with a 1400-mile non stop flight to Alaska
- Dutch Harbor, Alaska
- Fairbanks, Alaska
- Edmonton, Canada
- Billings, Montana
- Denver, Colorado
- Dallas, Texas
