= George Bayoud =

American politician

- Born: George Salim Bayoud Jr. 1955 (age 70–71)
- Education: University of Texas at Austin
- Occupation: Investor

George Salim Bayoud Jr. (born 1955) is an investor in real estate, corporate ventures, and infrastructure projects in Dallas, Texas. and he serves as a senior advisor in a non-football-related manner for the Dallas Cowboys

== Biography ==
Bayoud served as an advisory board member of The Beck Group, the Crossroads Fund Group (now owned by Neuberger Berman), and he has served as Vice Chairman and Trustee of The Alamo Endowment. He has served on the board or as a senior advisor for Lehman Brothers,, the Parks and Wildlife Foundation of Texas, Dallas Zoological Society, the Texas Business Hall of Fame, Texas Lyceum, Greater Dallas Crime Commission, Executive Committee of the Dallas Chamber of Commerce (now the Dallas Regional Chamber), D/FW Advisory Board of the Nature Conservancy, the Associate Board of Southern Methodist University Cox School of Business, Phoenix House of Texas, the Young Presidents' Organization, and the St. Mark's School of Texas, from which he graduated and also served as the school's Board of Trustees President.

Bayoud graduated thereafter from the University of Texas at Austin, at which he was the president of the Texas Cowboys and interned in the office of Republican U.S. Senator John Tower. He served in both administrations of Texas Governor Bill Clements, first as personal assistant to the governor and, in his second term, as chief of staff and then as Secretary of State of Texas. At the time, he was the youngest secretary of state in the nation. After leaving government, Bayoud and Clements founded Raven Interests of Texas, Inc., a real estate investments firm, in Dallas. This led to his developing Knox Street in Dallas with high end retailers and luxury apartments in the 1990's.

Bayoud served as President of First Southwest Holdings which held First Southwest Company and First Southwest Asset Management, of which he also served as President - now which are owned by Plains Capital. He also served as the first Chairman of the Texas Ethics Commission, served on the Texas Economic Development Corporation Board of Directors, he was on the board of the Texas National Research Laboratory Commission (Superconducting Super Collider), and he was a Member of the Governor’s Business Council.. He also was appointed to the Economic Incentive Oversight Development Board by the State Comptroller of Texas.

Bayoud was the Chairman of the Texas State History Museum Foundation, a nonprofit organization which raised funds and support for the building of, and continued support for, the Bullock Texas State History Museum. He also has been a chair of the Advisory Panel for the Clements Center for Southwest Studies at Southern Methodist University, and he is a life member of the University of Texas at Austin's Development Board.

Bayoud served as President of the bid committee to help bring Super Bowl XLV to Arlington, Texas as well as serving on the Board of Directors for the North Texas Local Organizing Committee which helped bring the 2014 NCAA Men's Final Four Championship to Arlington. Bayoud is the Founder and CEO of Cowboy Oil & Gas LLC. He funds a scholarship at The College of Liberal Arts' Department of Government at The University of Texas at Austin and he was a member The Commission of 125 for the University, a group of citizens guiding the University of Texas to serve Texas and society.

Bayoud is President of Lone Star Water Partners, LLC and he has been involved with the high-speed rail project looking to connect Dallas and Houston (Texas Central Railway project) and other Texas routes. He currently is the President of Bayoud & Company.

His father, George Sr., an emigrant from Marjayoun, Lebanon, was a long-time surgeon at University of Texas Southwestern Medical Center in Dallas and was appointed in 1988 by Governor Clements to the Texas Board of Medical Examiners.

Political offices
Preceded by Jack Rains	Secretary of State of Texas; 1989–1991	Succeeded by Ron Kirk
