= 1982 Texas State Treasurer election =

- November 2, 1982
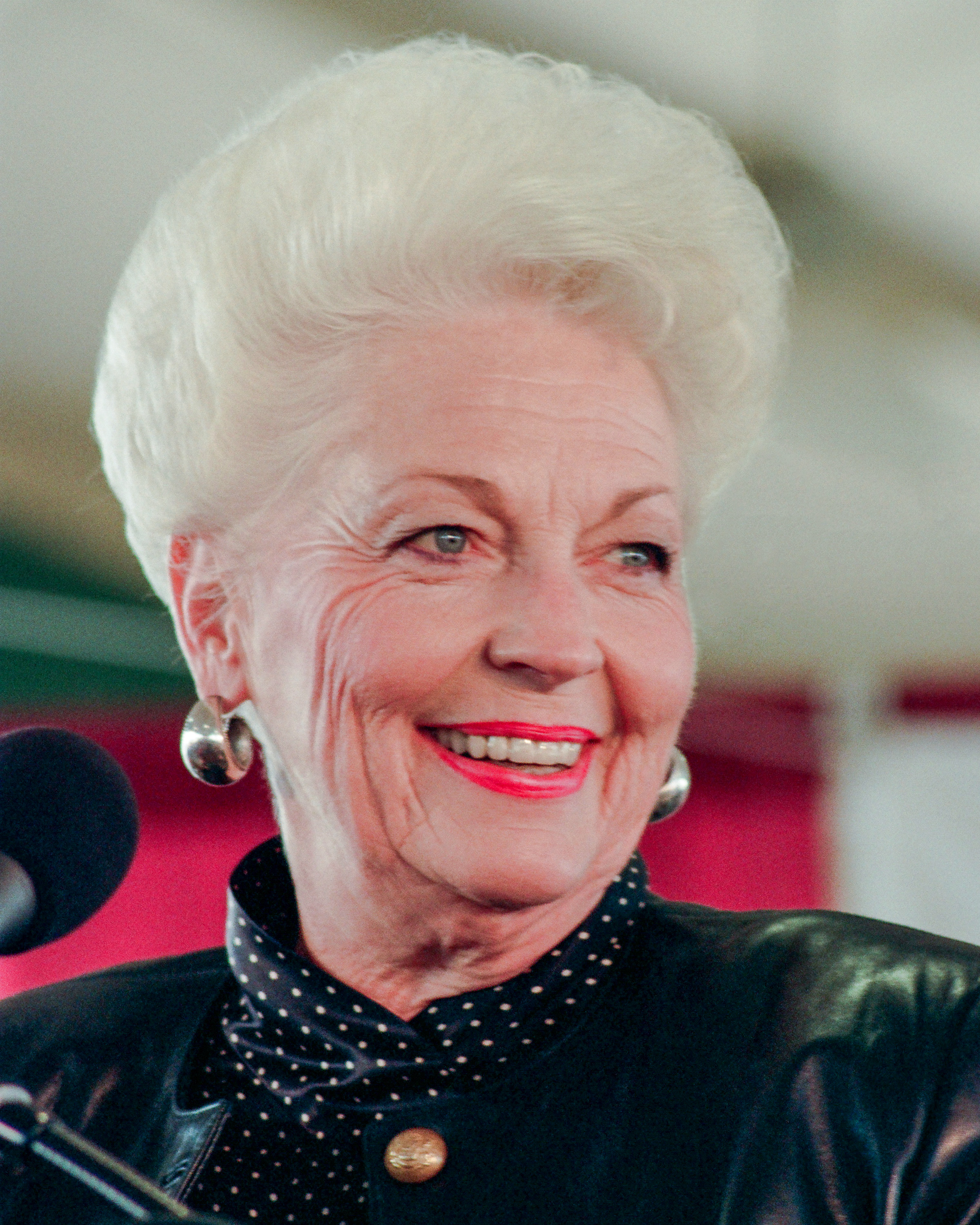

Nominee	Ann Richards	Allen Clark
Party	Democratic	Republican
Popular vote	1,883,781	1,159,823
Percentage	61.39%	37.80%
- County results Richards: 50–60% 60–70% 70–80% 80–90% >90% Clark: 50–60% 60–70%
Treasurer before election
Warren Harding
Democratic
Elected Treasurer
Ann Richards
Democratic

The 1982 Texas State Treasurer election was held on November 2, 1982, to elect the Texas State Treasurer. Primary elections were held on May 1, 1982. Democratic incumbent Warren Harding originally ran for a second term despite facing corruption charges but eventually dropped out in the primaries, leading to Travis County Commissioner Ann Richards to win the Democratic nomination. Millard Neptune won the Republican nomination unopposed but withdrew and was replaced with businessman Allen Clark. Richards won the election in a landslide, defeating Clark by over 20 percentage points.

== Democratic primary ==
=== Candidates ===
- John R. Cutwright
- Lane Denton, former Texas State House Representative (1971–1977)
- Warren Harding, incumbent Texas State Treasurer (1977–1983)
- Ann Richards, Travis County Commissioner (1977–1983)

=== Campaign ===
Warren Harding ran for re-election whilst facing a corruption scandal, his vulnerability led to several primary challengers entering the race. Harding placed second in the initial primary against Ann Richards but dropped out before the run-off election, leading to Ann Richards being declared the Democratic nominee.

=== Results ===
Democratic primary results
Party	Candidate	Votes	%
Democratic	Ann Richards	570,526	47.07%
Democratic	Warren Harding (incumbent)	411,623	33.96%
Democratic	Lane Denton	161,181	13.30%
Democratic	John R. Cutright	68,835	5.68%
Total votes		1,212,165	100.00%

== Republican primary ==
=== Candidates ===
- Millard K. Neptune, attorney

=== Campaign ===
Neptune won the Republican nomination unopposed but withdrew later on, leading to him being replaced on the ballot with businessman Allen Clark.

=== Results ===
Republican primary results
Party	Candidate	Votes	%
Republican	Millard K. Neptune	181,427	100.00%
Total votes		181,427	100.00%

== General election ==
=== Candidates ===
- Ann Richards, Travis County Commissioner (1977–1983) (Democratic)
- Allen Clark, businessman (Republican)
- Alma Kucymbala (Libertarian)

=== Results ===
1982 Texas State Treasurer election results
Party	Candidate	Votes	%	±%
Democratic	Ann Richards	1,883,781	61.39%	−34.64
Republican	Allen Clark	1,159,823	37.80%	N/A
Libertarian	Alma Kucymbala	24,994	0.81%	N/A
Total votes		3,068,598	100.00%	
Democratic hold				
