= Clayton Williams =

American businessman (1931–2020)

Personal details
- Born: Clayton Wheat Williams Jr. October 8, 1931 Alpine, Texas, U.S.
- Died: February 14, 2020 (aged 88) Midland, Texas, U.S.
- Party: Republican
- Spouse(s): Betty Meriwether (divorced), Modesta Williams (his death)
- Education: Texas A&M University
- Occupation: Businessman

Military service
- Allegiance: United States
- Branch/service: United States Army
- Years of service: 1954–1957

Clayton Wheat "Claytie" Williams Jr. (October 8, 1931 – February 14, 2020) was an American businessman from Midland, Texas who ran for governor in 1990. Despite securing the Republican nomination and initially leading in the polls against Democratic challenger State Treasurer Ann Richards by twenty points, Williams ultimately lost the race due in part to a comment he made about rape. During the campaign Williams cultivated an image of a cowboy figure who had risen from humble roots to become a powerful business tycoon. The image played well in public opinion polls. Williams often had a propensity for making poorly planned statements on the campaign trail.

== Early life ==
He graduated from Texas A&M University in College Station in 1954 with a degree in animal husbandry. Then, as had his father during World War I, he served in the U.S. Army.

== Career ==
In 1957, Williams followed in the business of his father, beginning in the oil fields of West Texas as a lease broker. Many of his companies were petroleum-related with interests in the exploration and production of natural gas and transportation and extraction of natural gas and natural gas liquids. In 1993, he took Clayton Williams Energy, Inc. public.

Williams diversified into the more traditional businesses of farming, ranching, real estate, and banking. He also tried his hand at long distance telecommunications. For a time he operated a long distance company, ClayDesta, named for both himself and his wife, Modesta. Williams also taught for six years in the Texas A&M College of Business Administration.

As an administrator, Clayton served as the vice president and director of the Association of Former Students at Texas A&M in 1977.

In January 2017, Clayton Williams Energy was sold to Noble Energy for $2.7 billion.

== Political life ==
=== 1990 Texas gubernatorial race ===
Williams began his run for Governor of Texas as one of several Republicans looking to succeed outgoing Governor Bill Clements, who had been elected to a second, non-consecutive term in the 1986 election (he had previously been elected in 1978). Clements elected not to run for a third term after he was strongly implicated in a pay-for-play scandal at Southern Methodist University, where he had served as the Director of the Board of Governors in between his terms as Governor of Texas.

He defeated a field of candidates for the nomination that included former U.S. Representative and outgoing Railroad Commissioner Kent Hance of Lubbock, former Texas Secretary of State Jack Rains of Houston and Dallas lawyer Tom Luce.

Williams spent freely from his personal fortune, running a "Good Old Boy" campaign initially appealing to conservatives. Prior to a series of gaffes, he was leading polling in double-digits in a race dubbed "Claytie vs. The Lady" by national media. A win would have made him only the second Republican governor of Texas since Reconstruction after Clements.

In one of his widely publicized missteps, Williams refused to shake hands with Ann Richards in a public debate, an act seen as uncouth. He also expressed a lack of knowledge on the one constitutional amendment on the ballot and having not paid a cent of income tax in 1986.

During the campaign, Williams publicly made a comment, which he later said was a joke, that likened the crime of rape to bad weather, having stated: "If it's inevitable, just relax and enjoy it". Also, during the campaign, allegations were made that as an undergraduate at Texas A&M, Williams had visited the Chicken Ranch, a brothel in La Grange, Texas, and Boy's Town, a Mexican red-light district near the border. As a result of his reported comments, Williams was occasionally parodied, such as in the mock political ad, "Satan Williams," which appeared on Dallas/Fort Worth public television during the 1990 campaign season.

Williams eventually lost the race despite leading Richards by 11 points as late as August and outspending her by almost 2-to-1. Exit polls stated that nearly half of voters for Richards went with her in the final month before election day. During his concession speech, Texas television stations showed Williams cracking a joke among his supporters: "I've got some good news and some bad news. The bad news is that we lost; the good news is that it is not the end of the world." When the crowd urged him to try again in four years, he told his supporters, "I may be an Aggie, but I am not crazy." Richards was defeated in the 1994 election by George W. Bush.

=== Other political activities ===
Williams raised over $300,000 for the 2008 John McCain presidential campaign. However, a fundraiser at Williams' home for June 16, 2008 was abruptly rescheduled and relocated after Williams' controversial 1990 comments about rape were mentioned to the McCain campaign by ABC News. The campaign condemned the remarks, saying that they were "incredibly offensive". The campaign said it would not return the money Williams had raised, as it was donated by other individuals.

In 2012, Williams donated $1 million to American Crossroads. He died of complications from pneumonia on February 14, 2020.

== Notes ==
Party political offices
Preceded by Bill Clements	Republican nominee for Governor of Texas; 1990	Succeeded by George W. Bush
