= Mary Rodgers (biomechanist) =

Mary M. Rodgers is an American biomechanist and physical therapist known for her contributions to the field of biomechanics and physical rehabilitation. Rodgers was born in 1954 and earned her undergraduate degree in physical therapy from the University of North Carolina at Chapel Hill in 1976, followed by a master’s degree in medical allied health, with a focus on biomechanics and education. She completed her PhD in Biomechanics at Pennsylvania State University in 1985, where her dissertation focused on plantar pressure distribution during barefoot walking.

In 1994, she joined the University of Maryland School of Medicine’s Department of Physical Therapy and Rehabilitation Science, where she served as department chair for 15 years. She retired in 2017 and holds the title of Professor Emerita.

== Career ==
Rodgers’ career spans clinical practice, research, and academia. Initially a clinical physical therapist, she transitioned to academia, taking on roles in various institutions such as Duke University, West Virginia University and Wright State University before joining the University of Maryland in 1994.

As Chair of the Department of Physical Therapy and Rehabilitation Science, Rodgers oversaw the department’s rise from being unranked to the top 10% of physical therapy programs nationwide. She was instrumental in launching five new degree programs, including one of the first PhD programs in Physical Rehabilitation Science housed within a physical therapy department and pioneering online doctoral programs for working clinicians.

=== Research ===
Rodgers’ research primarily focuses on injury prevention in wheelchair users and technological advancements in rehabilitation for healthy independent living.

Rodgers' research in the 1990s focused on understanding overuse injuries in manual wheelchair users, drawing on her clinical and research experience with spinal cord injury rehabilitation. She developed a handrim force measurement wheel and pioneered the use of three-dimensional motion analysis in wheelchair propulsion studies. Her work revealed biomechanical changes with fatigue that could lead to shoulder overuse injuries, resulting in the development of therapeutic exercise interventions adopted by the Department of Veterans Affairs.

Rodgers' collaborative research on gait dysfunction in individuals with stroke identified the neuromechanical processes involved in locomotor function loss and recovery. Her studies highlighted the potential of bilateral foot center of pressure measurements to assess the underlying control properties of the stroke-affected neuromuscular system. This work informed the development of individualized rehabilitation strategies, including treadmill-based aerobic exercise and robotic devices, improving predictions of ambulatory function.

Rodgers has also played a key role in studying, interpreting, and disseminating knowledge in the field of rehabilitation technology translation. She contributed to advancing rehabilitation technology through her role in the Physical Therapy and Society Summit, emphasizing the integration of technology in rehabilitation. Her involvement in the National Science Foundation-WTEC European Study focused on promoting the translation of technological innovations into practical rehabilitation applications. Rodgers has also held advisory roles with the National Institute for Biomedical Imaging and Bioengineering (NIBIB) and played an influential role in advancing rehabilitation technology development at the NIH.

She served as Director of the Pilot & Exploratory Studies Core for the Maryland Claude D. Pepper Older Americans Independence Center, facilitating research into aging-related disabilities.

=== International Society of Biomechanics (ISB) Involvement ===
Rodgers has held various leadership roles within the International Society of Biomechanics (ISB), including serving as President from 2003 to 2005. She played a crucial role in formalizing administrative processes, transition of the Society's activities to electronic format, developing student grant programs, and promoting gender equity in biomechanics. Rodgers' leadership led to the establishment of grants that continue to support emerging biomechanists. In 2015, she was awarded the ISB Fellowship for her contributions.

== Awards and Recognitions ==
- Fellow, American Physical Therapy Association (2009)
- Fellow, American Society of Biomechanics (2012)
- Fellow, International Society of Biomechanics (2015)
- George R. Hepburn Dynasplint Professorship, University of Maryland (2005-2017)
- Honorary University Marshal, University of Maryland (2018)
