= Thomas W. Luce III =

American lawyer and government official (1939/1940–2026)

Assistant Secretary of Education
- In office 2005–2006
- President: George W. Bush

Personal details
- Born: 1939 or 1940 Dallas, Texas, U.S.
- Died: July 25, 2026 (aged 86) Telluride, Colorado, U.S.

Thomas W. Luce III (1939 or 1940 – July 25, 2026) was an American lawyer, government official, non-profit executive, and advisor to Ross Perot. He was CEO of Biotech Initiatives at Lyda Hill Philanthropies.

== Early life and education ==
Thomas W. Luce III was born in Dallas, Texas, where he was raised by a single mother. He attended public schools in Highland Park Independent School District.

He received an athletic scholarship to Virginia Military Institute but transferred to Southern Methodist University where he earned a B.B.A. in 1962 and a J.D. from the Dedman School of Law in 1966.

== Spirit of Texas ==
In 1982, Ross Perot Jr. and co-pilot Jay Coburn completed the first round-the-world flight in a helicopter, the Spirit of Texas. Tom Luce helped facilitate the achievement by arranging for a container ship to carry a shipping container filled with jet fuel into the middle of the Pacific Ocean to serve as a refueling station.

== Purchase of Magna Carta ==
In 1984, Luce handled negotiations for a purchase of a 700-year-old copy of Magna Carta by Ross Perot. He brought the document to the United States wrapped in brown shipping paper and stowed in the coat closet across from his seat on a commercial American Airlines flight.

== Political activities ==
=== 1990 Texas gubernatorial race ===
In 1990, Luce ran for Governor of Texas as one of several Republicans looking to succeed outgoing Governor Bill Clements. He placed third in the Republican primary with 115,835 votes.

=== H. Ross Perot presidential campaign ===
A long-time advisor to Perot, Luce was the chairman of his campaign for President of the United States in 1992.

== Public service ==
=== George W. Bush administration ===
President Bush nominated Luce to the position of assistant secretary for the Office of Planning, Evaluation and Policy Development at the U.S. Department of Education on May 20, 2005, and the U.S. Senate confirmed his appointment to this position on July 1, 2005.

=== State of Texas ===
Luce was appointed to major posts by Texas governors five times, including as chief justice pro tempore of the Supreme Court of Texas, as well as posts on the Sunset Advisory Commission and the Superconducting Super Collider Commission. In 2012, Speaker of the Texas House of Representatives Joe Straus appointed Luce to the Cancer Prevention and Research Institute of Texas Oversight Committee.

== Nonprofit leadership ==
In addition to his legal career and public service, Luce has founded and led a number of nonprofit organizations including the National Math and Science Initiative and the Meadows Mental Health Policy Institute.

Luce later founded the state policy think tank Texas 2036, "a nonpartisan 501c3 nonprofit that hopes to use data and research to drive the planning and policy Texans will need to address challenges impacting [the] state's future."

== Death ==
Luce died from a cardiac arrest on July 25, 2026, at the age of 86.

== Honors ==
In 2012, U.S. News & World Report inducted Luce into the U.S. News STEM Leadership Hall of Fame.

Luce was recognized and honored by Republican Congressman Lamar Smith on the floor of the United States House of Representatives in 2012 "for his years of leadership and contributions to improving our public schools, strengthening higher education and supporting business and economic growth," and in 2015 by Democratic Congresswoman Eddie Bernice Johnson for his role in education reform in Texas.

In 2015, Sarah Fullinwider Perot and Ross Perot Jr. donated $1.75 million to endow the Thomas W. Luce, III Centennial Dedman Law Scholars Program at Southern Methodist University.

In 2018, he was awarded the 2018 Linz Award, an annual honor recognizing enduring civic or humanitarian efforts benefiting Dallas.

In 2021, Luce was inducted into the Dallas Business Hall of Fame.

In 2025, he was the recipient of the George W. Bush Institute Trailblazer Citation.
