= Mary Beth Rogers =

American writer

Mary Beth Rogers (born 1940) is an American writer.

== Biography ==
Rogers was born in 1940 in the U.S. and grew up in Dallas. She studied at the University of Texas at Austin and graduated with a degree in journalism.

During her career, Rogers worked for former Governor of Texas, Ann Richards, as the chief of staff, and later worked with KLRU.

In 2016, her book, Turning Texas Blue was published. Previously, she published a book about Barbara Jordan, named Barbara Jordan: American Hero, that was reviewed by The New York Times and Publishers Weekly.

In 2022, Rogers wrote a memoir called Hope and Hard Truth: A Life in Texas Politics. It was released in September 2022. The memoir was reviewed by Austin Chronicle and Texas Observer.

== Bibliography ==
- Cold Anger: A Story of Faith and Power Politics (1990)
- Barbara Jordan: American Hero (1998)
- Turning Texas Blue (2016)
- Hope and Hard Truth: A Life in Texas Politics (2022)
