= Ann Richards =

American politician (1933–2006)

- Richards in 1992

45th Governor of Texas
- In office January 15, 1991 – January 17, 1995
- Lieutenant: Bob Bullock
- Preceded by: Bill Clements
- Succeeded by: George W. Bush

Treasurer of Texas
- In office January 18, 1983 – January 15, 1991
- Governor: Mark White; Bill Clements
- Preceded by: Warren Harding
- Succeeded by: Kay Bailey Hutchison

Personal details
- Born: Dorothy Ann Willis; September 1, 1933 Lakeview, Texas (Lacy Lakeview), U.S.
- Died: September 13, 2006 (aged 73) Austin, Texas, U.S.
- Resting place: Texas State Cemetery
- Party: Democratic
- Spouse: Dave Richards (m. 1953; div. 1984)
- Children: 4, including Cecile
- Relatives: Gary Tinterow (first cousin once removed)
- Education: Baylor University (BA); University of Texas at Austin

Dorothy Ann Richards (née Willis; September 1, 1933 – September 13, 2006) was an American politician who served as the 45th governor of Texas from 1991 to 1995. A Democrat, she first came to national attention as the Texas State Treasurer, when she gave the keynote address at the 1988 Democratic National Convention. Richards was the second female governor of Texas (the first being Miriam A. Ferguson), and was frequently noted in the media for her outspoken feminism and her one-liners.

Born in McLennan County, Texas, Richards became a schoolteacher after graduating from Baylor University. She won election to the Travis County Commissioners' Court in 1976, and took office as Texas State Treasurer in 1983. She delivered a nominating speech for Walter Mondale at the 1984 Democratic National Convention, and the keynote address at the 1988 Democratic National Convention.

Richards won the 1990 Texas gubernatorial election, defeating Texas Attorney General Jim Mattox in a Democratic primary run-off election and businessman Clayton Williams in the general election, and marking the last Democratic gubernatorial victory in Texas until Governor-elect Gina Hinojosa won the 2026 election. She was defeated in the 1994 Texas gubernatorial election by George W. Bush. She remained active in public life until her death in 2006.

== Early life ==
Richards was born in Lakeview (later part of Lacy Lakeview), in McLennan County, Texas. She was the only child of Robert Cecil Willis and Mildred Iona "Ona" Warren, both Texas natives. Robert was a pharmaceutical salesman who served in World War II and Mildred was a homemaker. Richards grew up in Waco, Texas, and the family briefly lived in San Diego, California before moving back to Texas at the start of Richards's high school years. At this time, she dropped her first name and went by her middle name. She participated in Girls State, a mock-government assembly. She also was the Texas delegate at the Girls Nation event in Washington, D.C., where she found her passion for politics. She graduated from Waco High School in 1950. She attended Baylor University on a debate team scholarship, and earned a bachelor's degree.

After marrying her high school sweetheart, David Richards, she moved to Austin, where she earned a teaching certificate from the University of Texas. Ann Richards taught social studies and history at Fulmore Junior High School (renamed Lively Middle School) in Austin from 1955 to 1956 while her husband attended law school. They briefly moved to Washington, D.C., and Dallas before returning to Austin in 1969. She became involved in politics and campaigned for Texas liberals and progressives, such as Henry B. Gonzalez, Ralph Yarborough, and future U.S. District Judge Sarah T. Hughes.

David and Ann Richards had four children: Cecile, Daniel, Clarke, and Ellen. Her first cousin once removed was the art historian Gary Tinterow.

== Political career ==
=== State Treasurer ===
In 1982, Richards won the Democratic nomination for that Texas State Treasurer, beating incumbent Warren G. Harding. In November, she beat Republican Allen Clark, becoming the first woman elected to statewide office in more than fifty years. In 1986, she was re-elected treasurer without opposition. Richards was a popular and proactive treasurer who worked to maximize the return of Texas state investments. At the 1984 Democratic National Convention, Richards delivered one of the nominating speeches for nominee Walter Mondale, and she campaigned actively for the Mondale/Ferraro ticket in Texas, even though President Ronald Reagan enjoyed great popularity in her state.

=== 1988 Democratic National Convention ===
Richards' keynote address to the 1988 Democratic National Convention put her in the national spotlight. The speech was highly critical of the Reagan Administration and then–Vice President George H. W. Bush. Her address was notable for several remarks: "I'm delighted to be here with you this evening, because after listening to George Bush all these years, I figured you needed to know what a real Texas accent sounds like", "Poor George, he can't help it. He was born with a silver foot in his mouth", "Two women in 160 years is about par for the course. But if you give us a chance, we can perform. After all, Ginger Rogers did everything that Fred Astaire did. She just did it backwards and in high heels", and "When we pay billions for planes that won't fly, billions for tanks that won't fire, and billions for systems that won't work, that old dog won't hunt. And you don't have to be from Waco to know that when the Pentagon makes crooks rich and doesn't make America strong, that it's a bum deal". In the presidential debate that year between Republican George Bush and Democrat Michael Dukakis, Bush referenced Richards's uncivil comments about him during her speech on his way to winning the White House. The speech set the tone for Richards' political future. In 1989, with co-author Peter Knobler, she wrote her autobiography, Straight from the Heart: My Life in Politics and Other Places.

=== 1990 gubernatorial election ===
In 1990, Texas' Republican governor, Bill Clements, decided not to run for re-election to a third nonconsecutive term. Richards painted herself as a sensible progressive and won the Democratic gubernatorial nomination against Attorney General (and former U.S. representative) Jim Mattox of Dallas and former governor Mark White of Houston. Mattox ran a particularly abrasive campaign against Richards, accusing her of having had drug problems beyond alcoholism. The Republicans nominated eccentric multi-millionaire rancher Clayton Williams. Republican political activist Susan Weddington of San Antonio, a Williams supporter, placed a black wreath that read "Death to the Family" at the door of Richards's campaign headquarters in Austin.

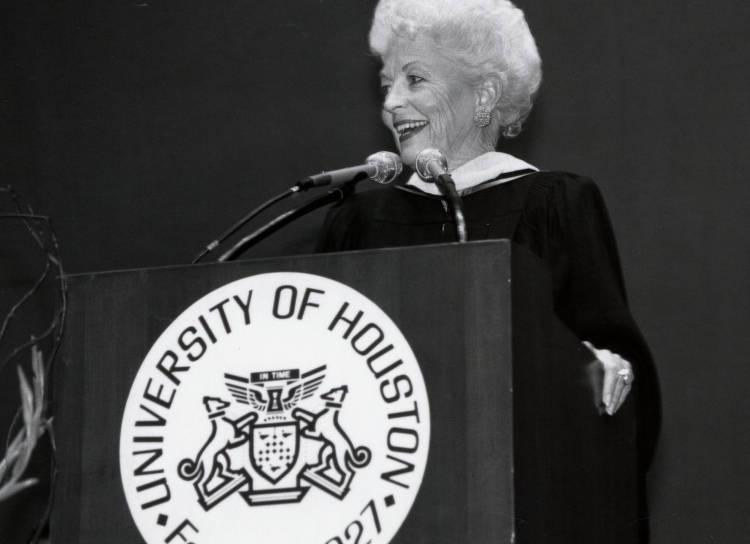
Richards speaking at a 1992 University of Houston commencement

On November 6, 1990, after a series of gaffes by Williams (most notably a joke about rape), Richards narrowly won with 49% of the vote to Williams' 47%. Libertarian Party nominee Jeff Daiell drew 3.3% in an effort that included television spots and considerable personal campaigning.

=== Governorship (1991–1995) ===
External videos
- Richards's inauguration from January 15, 1991
- Inaugural Parade Part I
- Inaugural Parade Part II

Richards was inaugurated governor January 15, 1991. She became the second woman to hold Texas's top office since Miriam "Ma" Ferguson. Her chief of staff was Mary Beth Rogers.

As governor, Richards reformed the Texas prison system, establishing a substance abuse program for inmates, reducing the number of violent offenders released, and increasing prison space to deal with a growing prison population (which grew from less than 60,000 in 1992 to more than 90,000 in 1994). She backed proposals to reduce the sale of semi-automatic firearms and "cop-killer" bullets in the state.

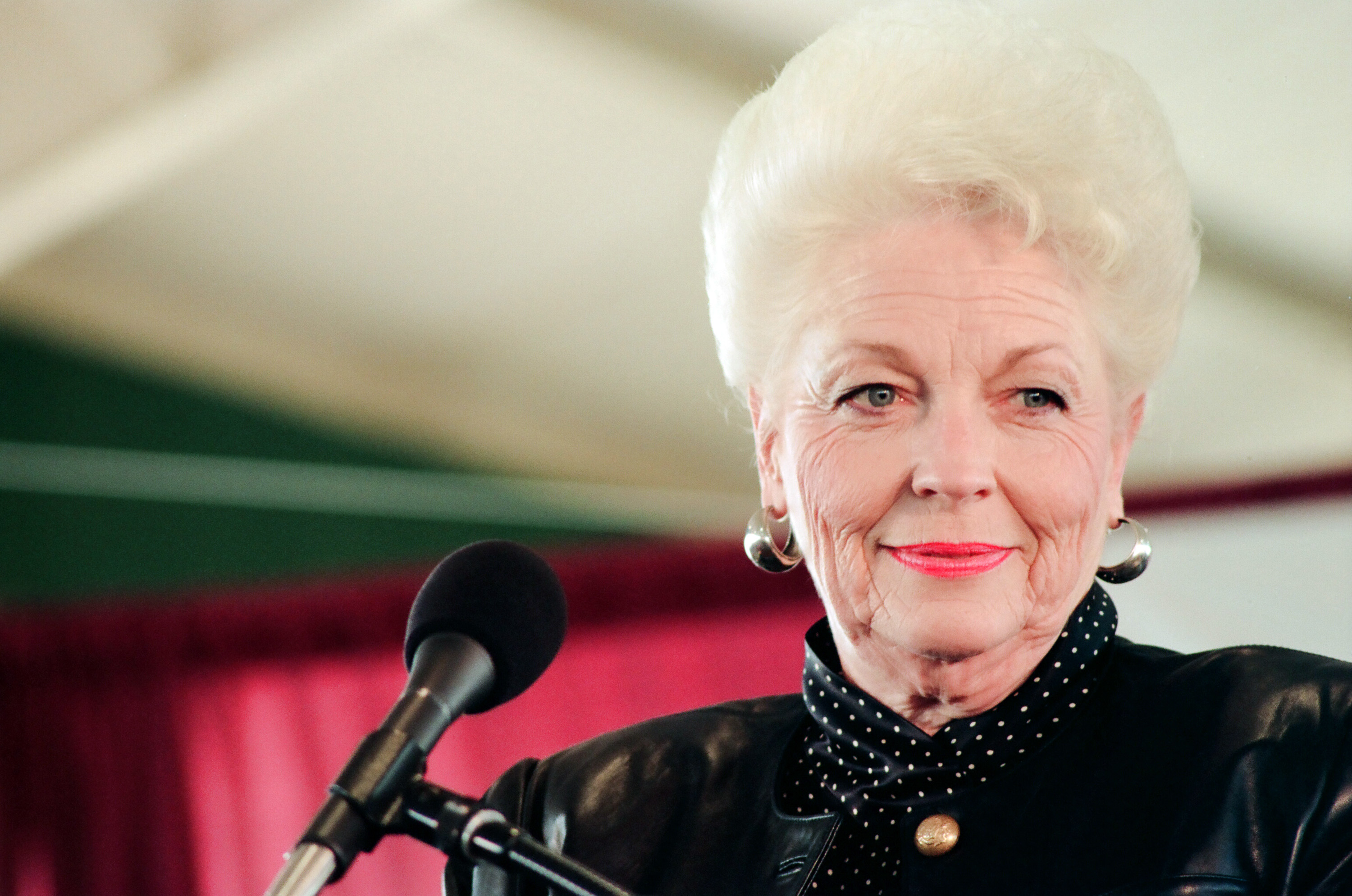
Richards in 1992

The Texas Lottery was also instituted during her governorship—advocated as a means of supplementing school finances; Richards purchased the first lottery ticket on May 29, 1992, in Oak Hill, near Austin.

School finance remained one of the key issues of Richards' governorship and of those succeeding hers; the famous Robin Hood plan was launched in the 1992–1993 biennium and attempted to make school funding more equitable across school districts. Richards also sought to decentralize control over education policy to districts and individual campuses; she instituted "site-based management" to this end.

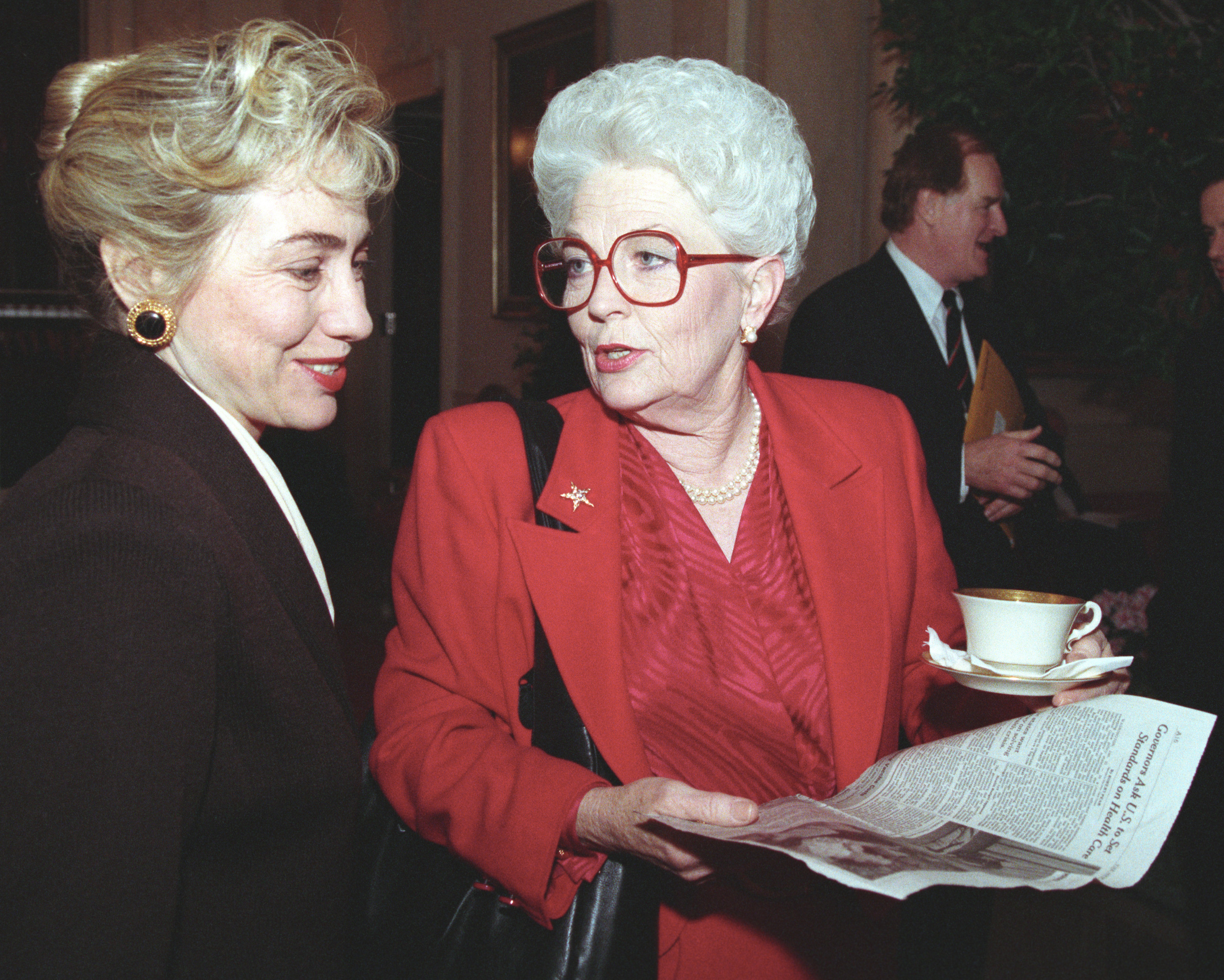
Richards with First Lady Hillary Clinton in 1993.

One of her first goals was to focus on education. To do so, she held a "school assembly" on January 19, 1991, where she met with students as well as teachers from all over Texas to hear directly from the source what needed to change in the school systems. She found this to be important because these are the people who were directly affected by the education system at the time. She found education to be extremely important and this was clear during her time in office.

In 1993, Richards signed into law the re-codified Texas Penal Code which included anti-homosexual Section 21.06, the state's "Homosexual Conduct" law which states: "(a) A person commits an offense if he engages in deviate sexual intercourse with another individual of the same sex. (b) An offense under this section is a Class C misdemeanor.". During her campaign in 1990, Richards had campaigned in Houston to repeal the law. But, as governor, her signature criminalized same-sex sexual relations in Texas. However, according to Bryan Wildenthal, the Associate Professor of Law at the Thomas Jefferson School of Law in San Diego, Richards sent a proposed criminal code revision that eliminated the sodomy ban to the Texas Legislature, but was overridden. She reluctantly signed the ban into law because vetoing it meant denying other "progressive improvements" in the code, while the ban was likely going to be passed at a different point.

In 1994, Richards ran for re-election against Republican George W. Bush. Despite outspending his campaign by 23%, she was defeated, with 45.88% of the vote to Bush's 53.48% while Libertarian Keary Ehlers received 0.64%. The Richards campaign had hoped for a misstep from the relatively inexperienced Republican nominee, but none appeared, while Richards created many of her own, including calling Bush "some jerk", "shrub" and "that young Bush boy".

== Post-governorship ==
Richards was defeated in the 1994 Republican landslide that also unseated New York governor Mario Cuomo and brought a Republican majority to the United States Senate and the United States House of Representatives. Shortly afterward, Richards and Cuomo appeared in a series of humorous television commercials for the snack food Doritos in which they discussed the "sweeping changes" occurring. The changes they are discussing turn out to be the new Doritos packaging.

Beginning in 2001, Richards was a senior advisor to the communications firm Public Strategies, Inc. in Austin and New York. From 1995 to 2001, Richards was also a senior advisor with Verner, Liipfert, Bernhard, McPherson and Hand, a Washington, D.C.–based international law firm. Richards sat on the boards of the Aspen Institute, JCPenney, and T.I.G. Holdings.

One of her daughters, Cecile Richards, served as president of Planned Parenthood from 2006 to 2018. Ann Richards demonstrated interest in social causes such as equality, abortion, and women's rights.

She was a tireless campaigner for Democratic candidates throughout the United States. In the 2004 presidential election, Richards endorsed Howard Dean for the Democratic nomination, and campaigned on his behalf. Richards later stumped for Democratic nominee John Kerry, highlighting the issues of health care and women's rights. Some political pundits mentioned her as a potential running mate to Kerry; however, she did not make his list of top finalists, and he selected North Carolina Senator John Edwards. Richards said that she was "not interested" in a political comeback.

== Teaching ==
Richards taught social studies and history at Fulmore Junior High School (now Lively Middle School) in Austin (1955-1956). She continued teaching in later years.

Education was of extreme importance to Richards, especially when it came to solving crime and economic problems in Texas. In November, 1989, she held a campaign speech in Bryan, Texas where she spoke about Texas' criminal justice and economic system and the work that needed to be done to educate the people in order to create a sustainable environment. Richards put great emphasis on an investment in education to promote jobs in Texas' high technology fields and break its crime cycles, or else Texas would be in trouble.

She served at Brandeis University as the Fred and Rita Richman Distinguished Visiting Professor of Politics from 1997 to 1998. In 1998 she was elected as a trustee of Brandeis University in Waltham, Massachusetts, she was reelected in 2004, and continued to hold the position until her death.

Richards was diagnosed with osteoporosis in 1996, having lost 3/4 inch in height and breaking her hand and ankle. She changed her diet and lifestyle, and then her bone density stabilized. She spoke frequently about this experience, teaching or advocating a healthier lifestyle for women at risk of the disease. In 2004, she co-authored I'm Not Slowing Down, with the gynaecologist Richard U. Levine, which describes her own battle with osteoporosis and offers guidance to others with the disease.

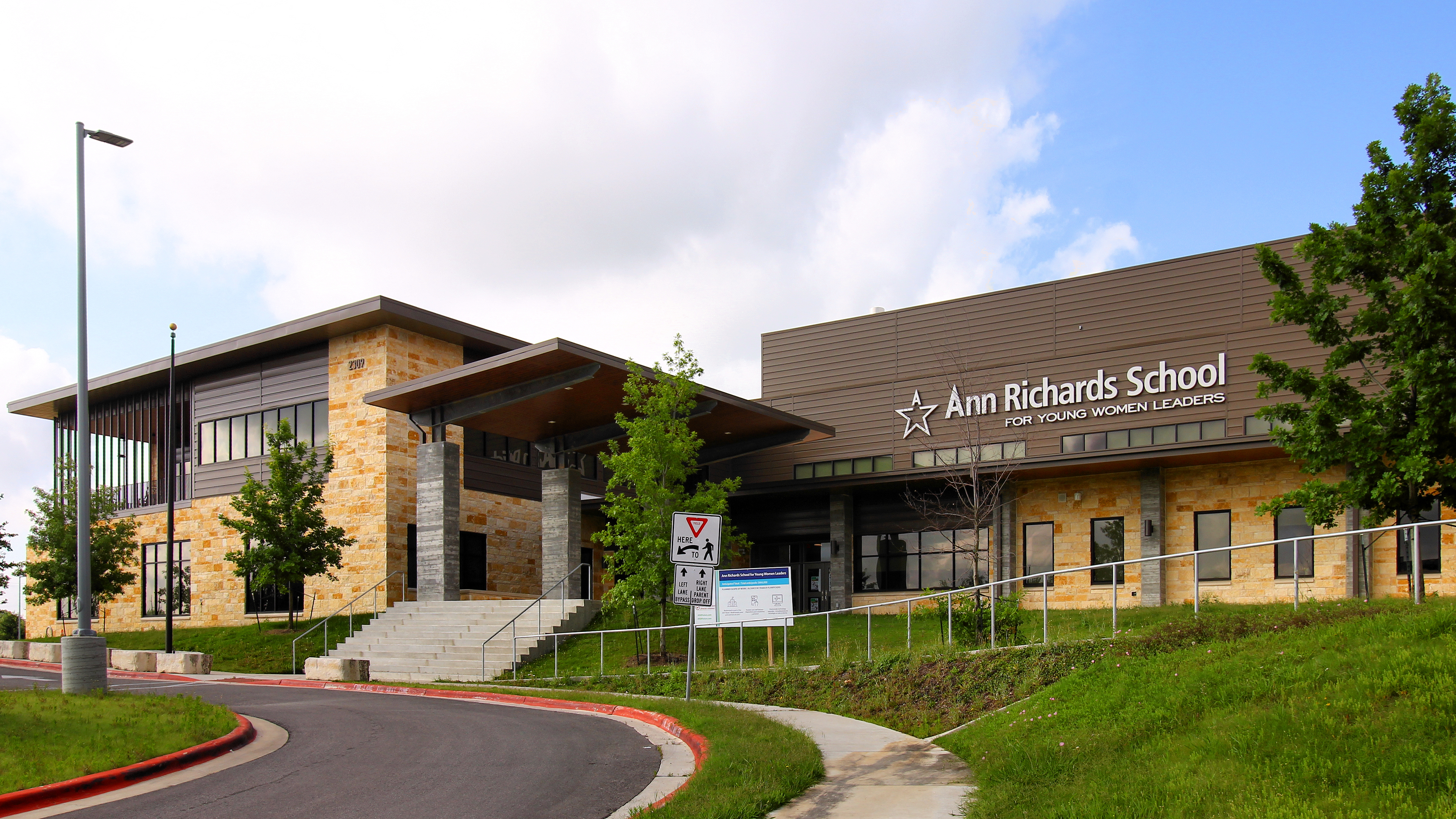
The Ann Richards School for Young Women Leaders, completed in 2022

At the end of Richards' life, she created a school for women called Ann Richards School for Young Women Leaders. The school opened on August 27, 2007 as part of the Austin Independent School District.

== Arts and film ==
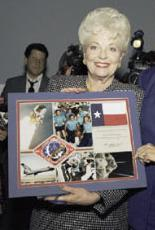
Richards holding a plaque of the STS-40 Space Shuttle mission, while visiting NASA/JSC as Governor in 1992

One of her first legislative requests was to move the Texas Music Office (created in 1990 during the administration of Governor Bill Clements) and the Texas Film Commission (created in 1971 during Governor Preston Smith's term) from the Texas Department of Commerce to the Office of the Governor. Her longtime personal interest in Texas film and music greatly raised the public profile of both industries and brought the two programs into the Governor's Office. As a result, these Industries were institutionalized as key high-profile parts of Texas' future economic growth plans.

Other of her music milestones include publishing the first "Texas Music Industry Directory" (1991) and her "Welcome to Texas" speech to the opening day registrants of the 1993 South By Southwest Music and Media Conference. She was involved with the Texas Film Hall of Fame from the beginning. At the first ceremony, she inducted Liz Smith. She was emcee the subsequent four years, but had to cancel in 2006 because of her diagnosis with cancer.

Richards said, "I've been a friend to Texas film since the number of people who cared about Texas film could have fit in a phone booth." She was an advocate for the Texas film industry and traveled to Los Angeles to market her state. Gary Bond, the director of the Austin Film Commission, noted, "She was far from being the first governor to appoint a film commissioner; I think she was the first that really brought the focus of Hollywood to Texas."

She was also a mentor to other women. She advised Rebecca Campbell, executive director of the Austin Film Society, "Whenever you speak in public you've got to tell them what you need from them." She put the spotlight on film as a genuine industry, brought more focus to Texas, and had a tremendous network of people in the entertainment industry. She gave more focus to film as a business than had been done before.

She was interviewed in the 1996 Ken Burns documentary series The West about the history of Texas and the United States in the 1800s. In the film she states that the colonization of the United States required genocide and dispossession, "But even knowing all of that. And wishing that part of it were not there, cannot take away the spirit and idealism and the excitement that people (settlers) felt that actually did it and that we still feel when we think about them doing it." Richards also appeared in a 2009 documentary film, Sam Houston: American Statesman, Soldier, and Pioneer.

It is believed that her last appearance in film was in a short public announcement used at the Alamo Drafthouse, asking patrons not to be disruptive during the film. The Alamo Drafthouse still uses it today, with an addition at the end in honor of Ann Richards.

Richards was active in the Austin City Limits Music Festival and the South by Southwest (SXSW) festival, the interactive music and film festival held each year in Austin.

== Awards and recognition ==
During her career, Ann Richards received many awards and honors. One of them being the Baylor Distinguished Alumni which is given to the "alumni who makes an outstanding contribution to biomedical and/or medical science through clinical service, research, education and/or administrative leadership." Another one is the Texas NAACP Presidential Award for Outstanding Contributions to Civil Rights. The winners get selected by the NAACP president for acknowledge a special achievement and distinguished public service. She was also awarded the National Wildlife Federation Conservation Achievement Award. Ann was also given the Orden del Aguila Azteca (Order of the Aztec Eagle) presented by the government of Mexico. Another being the Maurice N. Eisendrath Bearer of Light Award from the Union of American Hebrew Congregations, and finally the Texas Women's Hall of Fame honoree for Public Service. Ann Richards was also fortunate to have a public all girls preparatory school in Austin, Texas named in honor of her in 2007.

== Final years and death ==
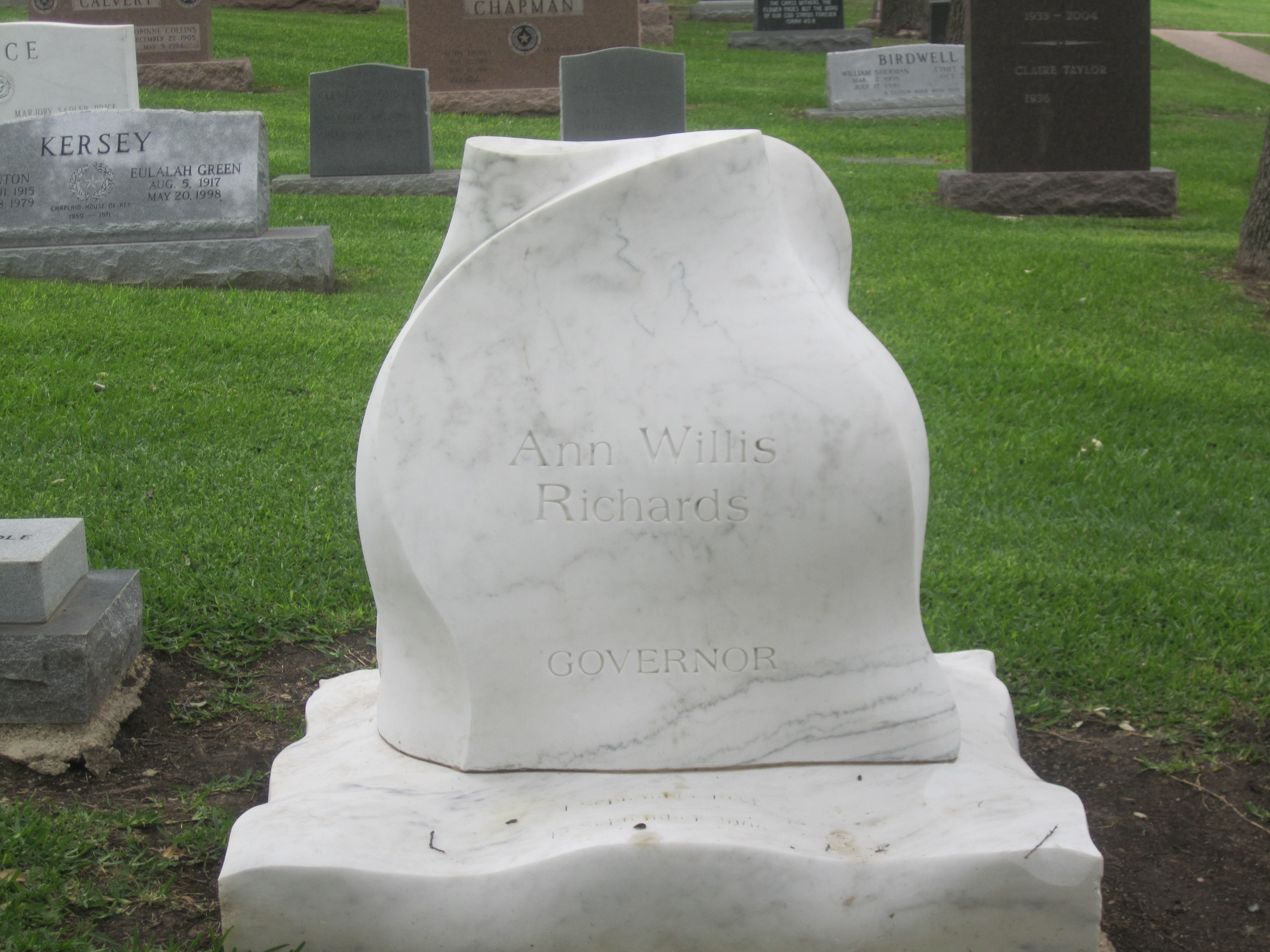
Ann Willis Richards monument at Texas State Cemetery in Austin, Texas

While the events of 9/11 motivated many New Yorkers to leave the city, Liz Smith wrote that it drove the former governor to that city, where she spent the last five years of her life. She said that she wanted to convey a message that "just because something tragic and life altering may happen, that doesn't mean we're supposed to turn heel and run away."

In March 2006, Richards disclosed that she had been diagnosed with esophageal cancer and received treatment at the University of Texas MD Anderson Cancer Center in Houston. Richards said that she "smoked like a chimney and drank like a fish" in her younger years.

Richards died of cancer at her home in Austin on September 13, 2006, at the age of 73. She lay in state at the Texas State Capitol rotunda on September 16–18, 2006, with Bill Clinton giving a eulogy during her memorial service on September 16. Three memorial services were held. She is interred at Texas State Cemetery in Austin.

== Legacy ==
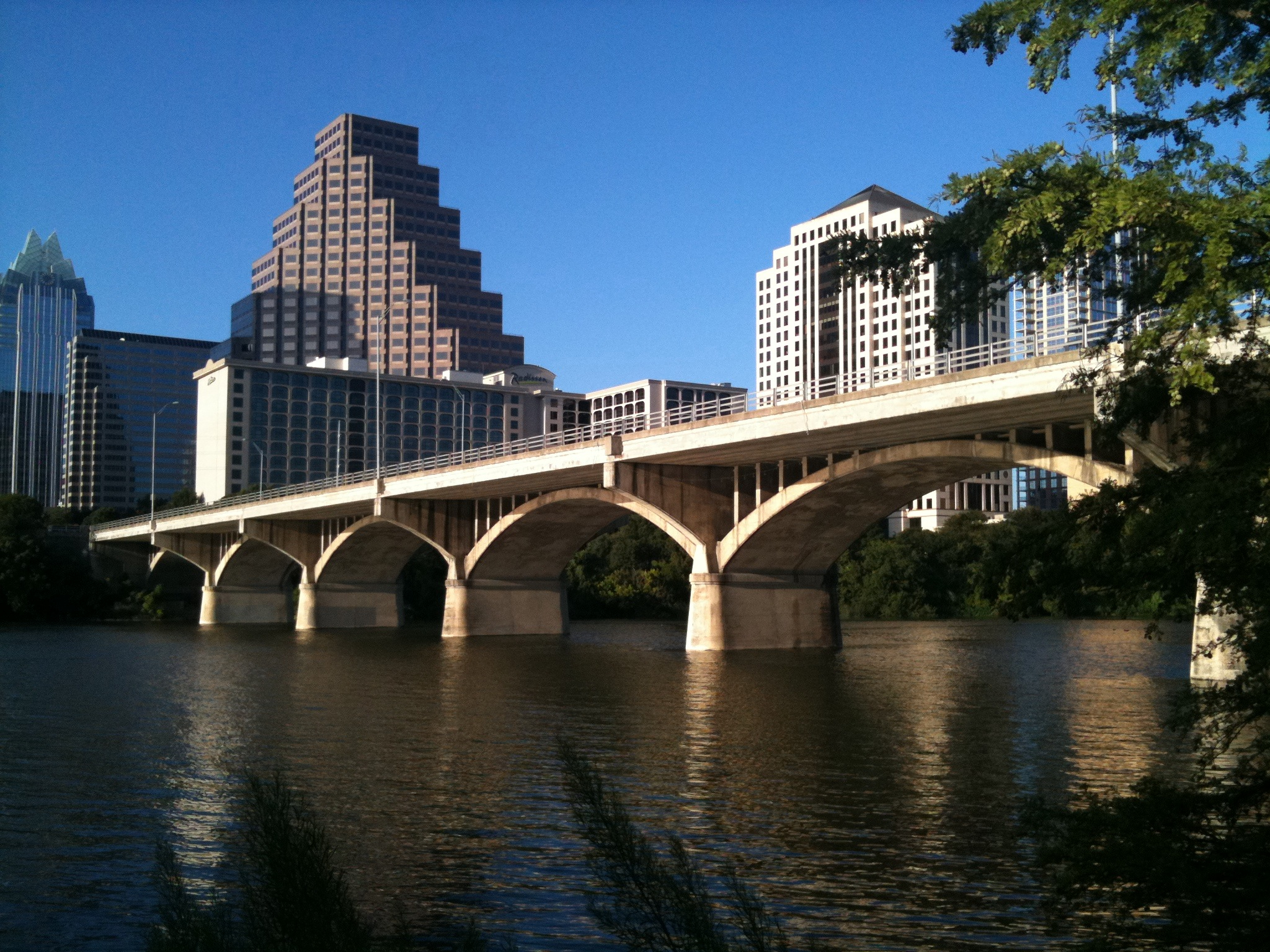
Ann W. Richards Congress Avenue Bridge

The City of Austin changed the official name of Congress Avenue Bridge (which opened in 1910) to Ann W. Richards Congress Avenue Bridge on November 16, 2006.

Richards' legacy has proven controversial among LGBT groups due to her involvement in the ratification of Section 21.06 of the Texas Penal Code, a measure that Richards had campaigned against in the 1990 Texas gubernatorial election. This law prohibits "deviate sexual intercourse [between] individual[s] of the same sex". This led LGBT commentator Dale Carpenter to describe Richards' legacy as "darkly anti-gay" and raise examples of men having been prosecuted for violating the law that Richards had signed. However, Bryan H. Wildenthal, associate professor and director of the Center for Law and Social Justice at the Thomas Jefferson School of Law, argued that this legislation was passed despite objections by Richards. Wildenthal added that vetoing the legislation would have resulted in the existing sodomy law remaining in force while sacrificing many other unrelated progressive improvements in the code.

== In popular culture ==
Richards was a topic in the film Bush's Brain (by Joseph Mealey and Michael Shoob), in a segment regarding her defeat in the 1994 election for Texas governor. The film presents the case that her defeat involved a whisper campaign that the governor was a lesbian, because she had allegedly hired many gays and lesbians to work on her re-election campaign.

Richards voiced herself in the King of the Hill episode "Hank and the Great Glass Elevator".

In the 2008 Oliver Stone film W., Richards is mentioned during George Bush's campaign as "Ms. Big Mouth, Big Hair".

In 2010, actress Holland Taylor debuted in a one-woman show called "Ann: An Affectionate Portrait of Ann Richards" at the Charline McCombs Empire Theater in San Antonio, Texas. The show was subsequently staged at the Kennedy Center in Washington, D.C., and the Vivian Beaumont Theater in New York City's Lincoln Center in 2013. PBS Great Performances broadcast the premiere of the play, now titled simply "Ann," on June 19, 2020. It had been recorded at the Zach Theater in Austin, Texas, following its national tour and Broadway run. Taylor reprised the role in 2022, presenting the West Coast premiere at the Pasadena Playhouse, which had been postponed from the theater's 2020 season due to the COVID-19 pandemic. She announced prior to the Pasadena production that it would be her final performance of the work. Taylor said of her subject, "She was brave, strong, and funny—Bill Clinton has said the wittiest person he'd ever met!...She ran as a liberal in conservative Texas, so I had to write a play about her four incredible years in Austin.... She was ahead of Obama by about 10 years as an 'inclusive' leader."

In 2012, a documentary about her political life, Ann Richards' Texas, was released. On April 28, 2014, HBO released a documentary, All About Ann: Governor Richards of the Lone Star State.

In 2019, "Call Me Ann: A Rock Opera" debuted in Houston, Texas, at the Houston Fringe Festival.

== Electoral history ==
1994 Texas gubernatorial general election
Primary election
Party	Candidate	Votes	%
Democratic	Ann Richards (incumbent)	806,597	77.79
Democratic	Gary Espinosa	230,310	22.21
Total votes		1,036,907	100.0
General election
Republican	George W. Bush	2,350,994	53.48
Democratic	Ann Richards (incumbent)	2,016,928	45.88
Libertarian	Keary Ehlers	28,320	0.64
Total votes		4,396,242	100.0
Republican gain from Democratic			

1990 Texas gubernatorial general election
Party	Candidate	Votes	%
Democratic	Ann Richards	1,925,670	49.47
Republican	Clayton Williams	1,826,431	46.92
Libertarian	Jeff Daiell	129,128	3.32
Write-in		11,517	.30
Total votes		3,892,746	100.0
Democratic gain from Republican			

1990 Democratic gubernatorial primary runnoff
Party	Candidate	Votes	%
Democratic	Ann Richards	640,995	57.09
Democratic	Jim Mattox	481,739	42.91
Total votes		1,122,734	100.0

1990 Democratic gubernatorial primary election
Party	Candidate	Votes	%
Democratic	Ann Richards	580,191	39.01
Democratic	Jim Mattox	546,103	36.72
Democratic	Mark White	288,161	19.38
Democratic	Theresa Hearn-Haynes	31,395	2.11
Democratic	Earl Holmes	17,904	1.20
Democratic	Stanley Adams	16,118	1.08
Democratic	Ray Rachal	9,388	0.63
Total votes		1,487,280	100.0

1986 Texas State Treasurer general election
Party	Candidate	Votes	%
Democratic	Ann Richards	2,425,836	91.7%
Libertarian	Robert Reid	220,024	8.3%
Total votes		2,645,860	100.00%
Democratic hold			

1982 Texas State Treasurer general election
Party	Candidate	Votes	%
Democratic	Ann Richards	1,883,781	61.39%
Republican	Allen Clark	1,159,823	37.80%
Libertarian	Alma Kucymbala	24,994	0.81%
Total votes		3,068,598	100.00%
Democratic hold			

1982 Democratic state treasurer primary
Party	Candidate	Votes	%
Democratic	Ann Richards	570,526	47.07%
Democratic	Warren Harding (incumbent)	411,623	33.96%
Democratic	Lane Denton	161,181	13.30%
Democratic	John R. Cutright	68,835	5.68%
Total votes		1,212,165	100.00%

== Notes ==
Political offices
Preceded by Warren G. Harding	Treasurer of Texas; 1983–1991	Succeeded by Kay Bailey Hutchison
Preceded by Bill Clements	Governor of Texas; 1991–1995	Succeeded by George W. Bush
Party political offices
Preceded by Warren G. Harding	Democratic nominee for Texas State Treasurer; 1982, 1986	Succeeded by Nikki Van Hightower
Preceded by Mario Cuomo	Keynote Speaker of the Democratic National Convention; 1988	Succeeded by Bill Bradley; Barbara Jordan; Zell Miller
Preceded by Mark White	Democratic nominee for Governor of Texas; 1990, 1994	Succeeded by Garry Mauro
Preceded by Jim Wright	Permanent Chair of the Democratic National Convention; 1992	Succeeded by Tom Daschle; Dick Gephardt
