= Boy's Town, Nuevo Laredo =

Red light district

Coordinates: 27°27′55″N 99°31′46″W

The Nuevo Laredo Tolerance Zone La Zona de Tolerancia Boy’s Town
- Red-light District
- Location within Tamaulipas
- Country: Mexico
- State: Tamaulipas
- City: Nuevo Laredo

Boy's Town (or La Zona, Disneylanda, La Zonaja, Zona de Tolerancia or Zona de Antros) is a commercial district in the border town of Nuevo Laredo, Tamaulipas, Mexico, serving primarily as a zona de tolerancia (red-light district) in the city for legal sex work, and also a variety of other nocturnal entertainment. It is a walled compound containing three short east-west streets and two short north-south streets. It houses a range of brothels, bars, restaurants, small stores, a small police station, and a health clinic. It is located near the intersection of Monterrey and Anahuac Streets, with the official gated entrance in Monterrey Street leading into Lucrecia Borga Street. Other entrances to the Zona have also been opened in the walls of the compound in Antonio Medina Street, at the other end of Lucrecia Borga Street.

== Historical precedent ==
The origins of the Boy's Town concept along the Mexico–United States border can be traced in part to the relationship that developed between the United States Army and various ad hoc entrepreneurs in northern Mexico during the army's 1916–17 Punitive Expedition; specifically when General John J. Pershing's forces were pursuing General Pancho Villa in Chihuahua. While the troops were based 100 kilometers south of Ciudad Juárez, Chihuahua, at Colonia Dublain, a small group of vendors, launderers, barkeeps, and prostitutes set up businesses next to the army camp. Eventually, General Pershing ordered that the prostitutes be restricted to the southern end of the camp where they would be inspected and certified by the military medical officers.

Within a few decades, this concept was adopted by vice entrepreneurs and city managers elsewhere along the border. These enclosed compounds, called zonas de tolerancia or Boy's Towns, were eventually established in at least seven Mexican cities along the U.S.-Mexico border (San Luis Río Colorado, Agua Prieta, Ojinaga, Ciudad Acuña, Piedras Negras, Nuevo Laredo, and Reynosa). Later, several other cities, not located on the border, established enclosed zonas as well, including Sabinas Hidalgo, Nuevo León, and Salina Cruz, Oaxaca.

The current enclave in Nuevo Laredo was constructed in the 1960s, during the municipal administration of Ernesto Ferrara Ferrara, to concentrate prostitution activities within a controlled zone.

== Layout during “golden age” of borderland tourism ==
Map of Boy's Town in the 1980's

The commercial activities could be differentiated into a number of broad categories, and their spatial organization was outlined in the map. The categories include: (1) primary or major brothels, (2) secondary brothels, (3) "cribs" of freelance prostitutes, (4) cantinas and bars catering to local patrons, (5) transvestite bars, (6) other commercial services, and (7) residences. Furthermore, Boy's Town was protected by a substation of the municipal police complete with jail, and there was a health clinic that performed blood tests and weekly screenings of sex workers for sexually transmitted infections.

=== Cantinas and bars ===
The cantinas and bars constituted a significant component of the economy. Most did not operate as brothels, but were instead venues for inexpensive drinks (usually just beer and tequila), live music, and dancing. Some were staffed with women who danced with customers for a fee or tips. They provided an inexpensive environment for local singles (and occasionally couples) to relax, listen to Cumbia, Norteño, or Ranchera music, and dance late into the night. Several were patronized by off-duty sex workers and their partners after working hours in the early morning.

While some gay bars also served as brothels catering to clients from the LGBTQ+ community as well as those who seek to have sex with trans and gay sex workers, they also served as social entertainment venues for the local queer community.

=== Other commercial services ===
In addition to entertainment facilities, a number of small restaurants and street eateries catered to patrons visiting the bars and brothels and to the individuals who lived and worked there. Other services included small convenience stores, clothing stores, seamstress shops that tailor outfits for the sex workers, and a photo studio.

While accurate figures of the total number of individuals residing in Boy's Town are not available, they ranged into the hundreds. Many sex workers resided in the brothels, cribs, or other rented rooms. Some workers lived with their partners in these rooms. Furthermore, several bar owners or managers lived there.

== Turn of the millenium economic downturn ==
=== Post-9/11 ===
The area drastically changed in the aftermath of the September 11 attacks. The emergence of TSA and stricter border crossings meant not only that weekend crossing and Spring breaks would face potential hours of waiting to cross the border, but stricter enforcement of laws meant it was harder for Americans under the age of 21 to take advantage of Mexico’s legal drinking age of 18.

=== Mexican drug war ===
The start of the Mexican war on drugs hit the Zona’s already diminished tourism revenue. After Ociel Cardenas’ trial in 2009, the Zetas Cartel broke away from the Gulf Cartel, taking control of much of northern Tamaulipas and reportedly owning much of the real estate in the Zona. A bloody turf war ensued, with several clashes in 2010 between them and Mexican armed forces, leaving dozens of casualties at times, with violence sometimes spilling into the Zona.

Eventually, the three largest establishments in the Zona de Tolerancia, Casino El Papagayo, Marabu and El Tamiko, closed down and were abandoned. The rest of the area reconfigured itself to cater to locals, specially for the local queer community. As of 2026, while the area still serves its local costumers, the biggest establishments (that relied on off-duty American military personnel and young tourists) are abandoned and covered in thick vegetation.

As of 2025, because of clashes between Cartel Jalisco Nueva Generación and the successors and remnants of the Zetas and Gulf Cartel, the United States Department of State still classifies Tamaulipas (and thus, Nuevo Laredo and the Zona) with a Level 4: Do Not Travel advisory.

After the decline of the Zetas, the Cartel del Noreste emerged as one of its more powerful heirs, though with nowhere near the strength of its predecessor. One proof of this is the fact that although its members are rumored to frequent establishments in the Zona de Tolerancia, they seem to be relatively uninvolved in the commercial sex trade of the area.

== Significance ==
=== In Nuevo Laredo ===
After the borderland tourism downturn, the area reorganized for local consumers, especially focusing on the local queer community. Some bars host Drag shows, including annual competitions and act as venues for Nuevo Laredo’s Pride parade afterparty, organized by Comité Nuestro Orgullo Laredo on Facebook.

There is an altar dedicated to La Santa Muerte in the southwestern edge of the walled compound. Another, in the northwestern corner’s outer wall, was reconstructed after being demolished by the army under president Felipe Calderon at the start of the war on drugs. The up-and-coming faith is not uncommon in places like the Zona de Tolerancia, a place where the very premise of its existence is to contain those things that are present in society, but commonly disregarded, discarded or marginalized. The regional rise in violence of the first two decades of 21st century, its position as both as a place of former glory and a refuge for subaltern cultural expressions of migration, sexual and gender diversity, sex work, alcohol consumption and recreational drug use; all make it an archetypal place for devotion for Santa Muerte to flourish.

=== In America ===
Boy's Town was referenced during the 1990 Texas gubernatorial race when Republican candidate Clayton Williams admitted that he had made visits for "servicing."

American scholarly analysis of Boy's Town includes a sociological study in the 1970s (Stevenson 1975) and several geographical surveys in the early 1990s by Arreola and Curtis.

== In popular culture ==
A collection of photographs of sex workers, customers, and other denizens of the zone was published in a 2000 book, Boystown: La Zona de Tolerancia. The images were originally discards and leftovers by souvenir photographers working in the area, compiled by screenwriter and photographer Bill Wittliff. One of the photographs showing an unusual-looking man sitting at a bar inspired the hairstyle and clothing of the Anton Chigurh character in the film No Country for Old Men.

In 2021, Mexican trans celebrity duo Las Perdidas visited Nuevo Laredo to record an homage to their original viral video. During their stay in Nuevo Laredo, they visited and performed at Selena’s Disco Bar, an establishment in the Zona de Tolerancia.

The 2019 poetry book Galáctica: Los Testimonios del Barrio Rojo, written by Nuevo Laredo author Cynthia Rodríguez Leija is inspired by testimonies of Zona de Tolerancia sex workers.

== See also ==
- Prostitution in Mexico
- Red-light districts
- Mexican War on Drugs
