= 2022 Austin municipal elections =

- November 8, 2022

The 2022 Austin, Texas municipal elections took place on January 25, May 7, November 8, and December 13, 2022. Five city council seats (District 1, District 3, District 5, District 8, and District 9) and the Mayor had regular elections, in addition to a special election in District 4. All positions are nominally non-partisan, though most candidates choose to affiliate with a party given Austin's strong Democratic lean.

== Election results ==
=== District 4 (special) ===
A special election was held on January 25, 2022, for City Council District 4, to fill the vacancy created by the resignation of longtime councilor Greg Casar, who resigned to run for U.S. Congress in District 35. Jose "Chito" Vela won the special election outright with 59.2% of the vote.

==== Declared ====
- Jose "Chito" Vela, former Austin Planning Commissioner and 2018 candidate for State Representative in District 46 (party affiliation: Democratic)
- Monica Guzman, community organizer and 2014 candidate for Austin City Council District 4 (party affiliation: Democratic)
- Jade Lovera
- Amanda Rios
- Melinda Schiera (party affiliation: Democratic)
- Isa Boonto-Zarifis
- Ramesses II Setepenre

2022 Austin District 4 special election
Candidate	Votes	%
Jose "Chito" Vela	2,141	59.2
Monica Guzman	497	13.8
Jade Lovera	402	11.1
Amanda Rios	349	9.7
Melinda Schiera	175	4.8
Isa Boonto-Zarifis	33	0.9
Ramesses II Setepenre	17	0.5
Turnout	3,614	%

Jose "Chito" Vela

State officials

- Sheryl Cole, state Representative from the 46th district
- Celia Israel, state Representative from the 50th district
- James Talarico, state Representative from the 52nd district

Local officials

- José Garza, Travis County District Attorney
- Delia Garza, Travis County Attorney
- Steve Adler, Mayor of Austin
- Natasha Harper-Madison, Austin city councillor for District 1
- Vanessa Fuentes, Austin city councillor for District 2
- Pio Renteria, Austin city councillor for District 3
- Greg Casar, former Austin city councillor for District 4
- Kevin Foster, Austin ISD Trustee, District 3

Labor unions

- AFSCME Local 1624
- Austin Central Labor Council
- Austin EMS Association
- Austin Firefighters Association
- CWA, District 6
- Education Austin
- IBEW, Local 520
- LiUNA Local 1095
- UNITE HERE! Local 23
- Workers Defense Action Fund

Organizations

- AURA
- Liberal Austin Democrats
- Our Revolution
- Stonewall Democrats of Austin
- University Democrats

Newspapers

- The Austin Chronicle (dual endorsement with Guzman)
Monica Guzmán

Local officials

- Noelita Lugo, Austin ISD Trustee, At-Large

Organizations

- Texas Sierra Club

Newspapers

- The Austin Chronicle (dual endorsement with Vela)

Notable individuals

- Carmen Llanes Pulido, District 9 Planning Commissioner
Amanda Rios

Organizations

- Save Austin Now

=== Proposition A (May 2022) ===
"Shall an initiative ordinance be approved to (1) eliminate enforcement of low-level marijuana offenses and (2) ban the use of "no knock" warrants by Austin police?

Proposition A (May 2022)
Choice	Votes	%
For	58,119	85.50
Against	9,857	14.50
Total	67,976	100.00

=== District 1 ===
Incumbent Natasha Harper-Madison ran for a second term. She won in the November 8th election with 53.2% of the vote.

==== Declared ====
- Natasha Harper-Madison, incumbent councillor (party affiliation: Democratic)
- Melonie House-Dixon (party affiliation: Democratic)
- Misael Ramos (party affiliation: Democratic)
- Clinton Rarey (party affiliation: Republican)

==== Declined ====
- Ora Houston, former District 1 councilor (2015–2019) (party affiliation: Democratic)

2022 Austin District 1 general election
Candidate	Votes	%
Natasha Harper-Madison	12,773	53.2
Misael Ramos	6,065	25.3
Melonie House-Dixon	2,649	11
Clinton Rarey	2,519	10.5
Turnout	24,006	%

=== District 3 ===
Incumbent Pio Renteria was ineligible for a third term, as he did not choose to collect the petition signatures required to bypass Austin's term limits.

==== Declared ====
- Jose Velasquez, community organizer (party affiliation: Democratic)
- Jose Noe Elias (party affiliation: Democratic)
- Gavino Fernandez Jr (party affiliation: Democratic)
- Daniela Silva, community organizer (party affiliation: Democratic)
- Jose Velasquez (party affiliation: Democratic)
- Yvonne Weldon
- Esala Wueschner

==== Declared ineligible ====
- Bertha Rendon Delgado (endorsed Silva) (party affiliation: Democratic)

==== Declined ====
- Pio Renteria, incumbent District 3 councilor (party affiliation: Democratic)
- Susana Almanza, community organizer and 2014+2018 candidate for District 3 (party affiliation: Democratic)

On November 8, 2022, Jose Velasquez and Daniela Silva advanced to a runoff. Velasquez went on to defeat Silva in the runoff election.

Jose Velasquez

Federal officials

- Joaquin Castro, U.S. Representative from Texas's 20th district
- Greg Casar, U.S. Representative-elect from Texas's 35th district

State officials

- Sheryl Cole, state Representative from the 46th district
- Eddie Rodriguez, state Representative from the 51st district

Local officials

- Andy Brown, Travis County Judge
- Delia Garza, Travis County Attorney
- Dyana Limon-Mercado, Travis County Clerk-elect
- Tonya Nixon, Travis County Constable, Precinct 1
- Adan Ballesteros, Travis County Constable, Precinct 2
- George Morales III, Travis County Constable, Precinct 4
- Steve Adler, Mayor of Austin
- Pio Renteria, Austin city councilor for District 3
- Jose "Chito" Vela, Austin city councilor for District 4
- Mike Martinez, former Austin city councillor, At-Large
- Julie Ann Nitsch, ACC Trustee, Place 9
- LaTisha Anderson, Austin ISD trustee, District 1
- Geronimo Rodriguez, Austin ISD trustee, District 6
- Jayme Mathias, former Austin ISD trustee, District 2
- Paul Saldaña, former Austin ISD trustee, District 6
- Cindy Anderson, former Austin ISD trustee, At-Large

Labor unions

- AFSCME Local 1624
- Austin Central Labor Council
- Austin EMS Association
- Austin Firefighters Association
- CWA, District 6
- Education Austin
- IBEW, Local 520
- LiUNA Local 1095
- UNITE HERE! Local 23
- Workers Defense Action Fund

Organizations

- AURA
- Austin Tejano Democrats
- Black Austin Democrats
- Friends of Austin Neighborhoods
- South Austin Democrats
- University Democrats

Newspapers

- The Austin Chronicle
- Austin American Statesman (runoff)

Notable Individuals

- Susana Almanza, 2014+2018 candidate for District 3
- Greg Anderson, District 4 Planning Commissioner
Daniela Silva

Organizations

- Austin Young Democrats
- LGBTQ+ Victory Fund
- Run For Something
- Austin Sierra Club
- Austin Stonewall Democrats
- Sunrise Movement - Austin

Notable individuals

- Julie Oliver, 2018+2020 Democratic nominee for U.S. Congress, District 25
- Chas Moore, founder, Austin Justice Coalition
- Jose Noe Elias, 2022 candidate for District 3
- Gavino Fernandez Jr, 2022 candidate for District 3
- Bertha Rendon Delgado, 2022 candidate for District 3
José Noé Elías

Newspapers

- Austin American Statesman

2022 Austin District 3 general election
Candidate	Votes	%
Jose Velasquez	7,674	36.4
Daniela Silva	7,260	34.4
José Noé Elías	2,318	11
Yvonne Weldon	1,947	9.2
Gavino Fernandez Jr	1,078	5.1
Esala Wueschner	806	3.8
Turnout	21,083	%

2022 Austin District 3 runoff election
Candidate	Votes	%
Jose Velasquez	4,181	53.4
Daniela Silva	3,649	46.6
Turnout	7,630	100%

=== District 5 ===
Incumbent Ann Kitchen was ineligible for a third term, as she did not choose to collect the petition signatures required to bypass Austin's term limits.

==== Declared ====
- Stephanie Bazan (party affiliation: Democratic)
- Ken Craig, chief of staff for District 5 incumbent Ann Kitchen (party affiliation: Democratic)
- Bill Welch
- Aaron Velasquez Webman, entrepreneur
- Brian Anderson

==== Declined ====
- Ann Kitchen, incumbent District 5 councilor (party affiliation: Democratic)

On November 8, 2022, Stephanie Bazan and Ryan Alter advanced to a runoff. Alter went on to defeat Bazan in the runoff election, in what was widely seen as an upset victory.

Ken Craig

State officials

- Sheryl Cole, state Representative from the 46th district
- Lulu Flores, state Representative-elect from the 51st district

Local officials

- Brigid Shea, Travis County commissioner for Precinct 2
- Ann Howard, Travis County commissioner for Precinct 3
- Sally Hernandez, Travis County sheriff
- Pio Renteria, Austin City Councillor, District 3
- Ann Kitchen, Austin City Councillor, District 5
- Leslie Pool, Austin City Councillor, District 7
- Kathie Tovo, Austin City Councillor, District 9
- Alison Alter, Austin City Councillor, District 10

Labor unions

- AFSCME Local 1624
- Austin Firefighters Association
- LiUNA Local 1095
- UNITE HERE! Local 23
- Workers Defense Action Fund

Organizations

- Austin Environmental Democrats
- Black Austin Democrats
- Stonewall Democrats of Austin

Newspapers

- The Austin Chronicle (duel-endorsement with Alter)
Ryan Alter

State Officials

- Donna Howard, State Representative from the 48th District
- Rebecca Bell-Metereau, State Board of Education member, District 5

Local Officials

- Margaret Gómez, Travis County Commissioner, Precinct 4
- Tonya Nixon, Travis County Constable, Precinct 1
- Pio Renteria, Austin city councillor, District 3
- Lynn Boswell, Austin ISD Trustee, District 5
- Noelita Lugo, Austin ISD Trustee, At-Large Place 8
- Arati Singh, Austin ISD Trustee, At-Large Place 9

Labor unions

- Education Austin
- LIUNA Local #1095

Newspapers

- The Austin Chronicle
- Austin American Statesman
Stephanie Bazan

State officials

- Gonzalo Barrientos, former state Senator from the 14th district
- Sheryl Cole, state Representative from the 46th district
- Lulu Flores, state Representative-elect from the 51st district

Local officials

- Stacy Suits, Travis County Constable from Precinct 3
- George Morales III, Travis County Constable from Precinct 4
- Natasha Harper-Madison, Austin City Councillor, District 1
- Ann Kitchen, Austin City Councillor, District 5 (runoff)
- Mike Martinez, former Austin city councillor, At-Large
- Paul Saldaña, former Austin ISD Trustee, Place 6

Organizations

- AURA
- Austin Sierra Club
- Austin Young Democrats
- Friends of Austin Neighborhoods
- Liberal Austin Democrats
- Texas College Democrats

Labor Unions

- Austin Firefighters Association

Notable individuals

- Ken Craig, 2022 candidate for District 5
- Brian Anderson, 2022 candidate for District 5
- Bill Welch, 2022 candidate for District 5
- Jay Kleberg, 2022 Democratic nominee for Texas Land Commissioner
- Julie Oliver, 2018+2020 Democratic nominee for Texas's 25th congressional district

2022 Austin District 5 general election
Candidate	Votes	%
Stephanie Bazan	9,600	29.3
Ryan Alter	7,933	24.2
Ken Craig	6,274	19.2
Bill Welch	4,861	14.8
Aaron Velazquez Webman	3,295	10.1
Brian Anderson	796	2.4
Turnout	32,759	%

2022 Austin District 5 runoff election
Candidate	Votes	%
Ryan Alter	7,931	59.6
Stephanie Bazan	5,369	40.4
Turnout	13,300	100%

=== District 8 ===
Incumbent Paige Ellis ran for a second term. She won in the general election.

==== Declared ====
- Paige Ellis, incumbent councilor (party affiliation: Democratic)
- Richard Smith (party affiliation: Republican)
- Kimberly Hawkins
- Antonio Ross

==== Declined ====
- Ellen Troxclair, former District 8 councillor (running for Texas House of Representatives) (party affiliation: Republican)

2022 Austin District 8 general election
Candidate	Votes	%
Paige Ellis (incumbent)	20,491	57.8
Richard Smith	10,066	28.4
Kimberly Hawkins	3,311	9.3
Antonio Ross	1,590	4.5
Turnout	35,458	%

Richard Smith

Organizations

- Save Austin Now

=== District 9 ===
Incumbent Kathie Tovo was ineligible for a fourth term, as she did not choose to collect the petition signatures required to bypass Austin's term limits.

==== Declared ====
- Zohaib "Zo" Qadri, community organizer (party affiliation: Democratic)
- Linda Guerrero, Austin ISD special education teacher (party affiliation: Democratic)
- Ben Leffler (party affiliation: Democratic)
- Greg Smith (party affiliation: N/A)
- Joah Spearman, entrepreneur (party affiliation: Democratic)
- Tom Wald, urbanist activist and director of the Red Line Parkway Initiative (party affiliation: Democratic)
- Zena Mitchell (party affiliation: Democratic)
- Kym Olson (party affiliation: Democratic)

==== Declined ====
- Kathie Tovo, incumbent District 9 councilor (endorsed Guerrero) (party affiliation: Democratic)
- Chris Riley, former At-Large councillor and 2014 runner-up for District 9 (endorsed Wald+Spearman, then Qadri) (party affiliation: Democratic)
- Danielle Skidmore, 2018 candidate for District 9 (endorsed Qadri) (party affiliation: Democratic)

Zohaib "Zo" Qadri defeated Linda Guerrero in the December 13, 2022 runoff election with 51.2% of the vote.

2022 Austin District 9 general election
Candidate	Votes	%
Zohaib "Zo" Qadri	10,870	30
Linda Guerrero	8,066	22.3
Ben Leffler	7,677	21.2
Greg Smith	3,162	8.7
Joah Spearman	1,951	5.4
Tom Wald	1,878	5.2
Zena Mitchell	1,555	4.3
Kym Olson	1,031	2.8
Turnout	36,190	%

2022 Austin District 9 runoff election
Candidate	Votes	%
Zohaib "Zo" Qadri	7,293	51.2
Linda Guerrero	6,950	48.8
Turnout	14,243	100%

Linda Guerrero

State Officials

- Lulu Flores, state Representative-elect from the 51st district
- Gonzalo Barrientos, former state Senator from the 14th district

Local Officials

- Brigid Shea, Travis County Commissioner, Precinct 2
- Margaret Gomez, Travis County Commissioner, Precinct 4
- George Morales III, Travis County Constable, Precinct 4
- Ann Kitchen, Austin City Councillor, District 5
- Leslie Pool, Austin City Councillor, District 7
- Kathie Tovo, Austin City Councillor, District 9
- Alison Alter, Austin City Councillor, District 10
- Ora Houston, former Austin City Councillor, District 1

Labor unions

- AFSCME Local 1624
- Austin EMS Association
- Austin Firefighters Association, IAFF Local 975 (duel endorsement with Qadri)
- UNITE HERE! Local 23

Organizations

- Austin Environmental Democrats
- Austin Tejano Democrats
- Black Austin Democrats
- Central Austin Democrats
- Liberal Austin Democrats
- Austin Sierra Club

Newspapers

- The Austin Chronicle

Notable individuals

- Carmen Llanes Pulido, District 9 Planning Commissioner

Zohaib "Zo" Qadri

Federal Officials

- Elizabeth Warren, U.S. Senator from Massachusetts
- Sheila Jackson Lee, U.S. Representative from Texas's 18th district
- Greg Casar, U.S. Representative-elect from Texas's 35th district
- Chris Bell, former U.S. Representative from Texas's 25th district

State Officials

- Jim Hightower, former Texas Agricultural Commissioner
- Wendy Davis, former State Senator from the 10th district and 2014 Democratic nominee for Governor of Texas
- John Whitmire, State Senator from the 15th district
- Alex Dominguez, State Representative from the 37th district
- Sheryl Cole, State Representative from the 46th district
- Donna Howard, State Representative from the 48th district
- Eddie Rodriguez, State Representative from the 51st district
- James Talarico, State Representative from the 52nd district
- John Bucy III, State Representative from the 136th district
- Gene Wu, State Representative from the 137th district

Local Officials

- Steve Adler, Mayor of Austin
- Natasha Harper-Madison, Austin City Councillor, District 1
- José "Chito" Vela, Austin City Councillor, District 4
- Jimmy Flannigan, former Austin City Councillor, District 6
- Chris Riley, former Austin City Councillor, At-Large and 2014 candidate for Austin City Council District 9
- José Garza, Travis County District Attorney
- Delia Garza, Travis County Attorney
- Sean Hassan, ACC Trustee Place 4
- Stephanie Gharakhanian, ACC Trustee Place 8
- Julie Ann Nitsch, ACC Trustee Place 9
- Lynn Boswell Austin ISD Trustee, District 5
- Noelita Lugo, Austin ISD Trustee, At-Large

Notable Individuals

- Ben Leffler, 2022 candidate for Austin City Council District 9
- Tom Wald, 2022 candidate for Austin City Council District 9
- Zena Mitchell, 2022 candidate for Austin City Council District 9
- Danielle Skidmore, 2018 candidate for Austin City Council District 9
- Mike Siegel, 2018+2020 Democratic nominee for Texas's 10th congressional district
- Julie Oliver, 2018+2020 Democratic nominee for US Congress, Texas's 25th congressional district
- Jessica Cisneros, 2020+2022 Democratic candidate for US Congress, Texas's 28th congressional district

Labor unions

- Austin Firefighters Association, IAFF Local 975 (duel endorsement with Guerrero)
- Education Austin
- LIUNA #1095
- IBEW Local 520
- Workers Defense Action Fund

Organizations

- AURA
- Austin Young Democrats
- Our Revolution
- Run For Something
- Sunrise Movement Austin
- Texas College Democrats
- University Democrats

Newspapers

- Austin American-Statesman
- The Hyde Parker

Ben Leffler

Newspapers

- Austin American Statesman
- The Austin Chronicle (duel endorsement with Guerrero)
Joah Spearman

Local Officials

- Kevin Foster, Austin ISD Trustee, District 3

Notable Individuals

- Chas Moore, Founder, Austin Justice Coalition
- Nelson Linder, President, Austin NAACP

Greg Smith

Organizations

- Save Austin Now

=== Proposition A (November) ===
Proposition A was a bond election.

The ballot language read:

"The issuance of $350,000,000 in tax-supported general obligation bonds and notes for planning, designing, acquiring, constructing, renovating, improving and equipping affordable housing facilities for low and moderate income persons and families, and acquiring land and interests in land and property necessary to do so, funding loans and grants for affordable housing, and funding affordable housing programs, as may be permitted by law; and the levy of a tax sufficient to pay for the bonds and notes."

Proposition A (November 2022)
Choice	Votes	%
For	223,505	70.91
Against	91,707	29.09
Total	315,212	100.00
