= 2024 Austin municipal elections =

- November 5, 2024

The 2024 Austin, Texas municipal elections took place on Tuesday, November 5, 2024. Five city council seats (District 2, District 4, District 6, District 7, and District 10) and the mayor have regular elections. All positions are nominally non-partisan, though most candidates choose to affiliate with a party given Austin's strong Democratic lean.

== Candidates ==
=== Mayor ===
Incumbent Mayor Kirk Watson won re-election, defeating four other candidates.

=== City Council, District 2 ===
Incumbent Vanessa Fuentes won re-election to a second term.

=== City Council, District 4 ===
Incumbent Jose "Chito" Vela won a full term, after being elected in a 2022 special election.

=== City Council, District 6 ===
Incumbent Mackenzie Kelly was defeated by challenger Krista Laine.

Mackenzie Kelly

Elected Officials

- Ellen Troxclair, state representative from the 19th district
- Cynthia Long, Williamson County Commissioner
- Stacy Suits, Travis County Constable, Precinct 2
- Lee Cooke, former Mayor of Austin

Organizations

- Austin EMS Association
- Austin Firefighters Association
- Save Austin Now
- Travis County Republican Party

Newspapers

- Austin American Statesman

Notable Individuals

- Matt Mackowiak, Chair, Travis County Republican Party
Krista Laine

Elected officials

- Sarah Eckhardt, state Senator from the 14th district
- Sheryl Cole, state Representative from the 46th district
- Vikki Goodwin, state Representative from the 47th district
- James Talarico, state Representative from the 50th district
- John Bucy III, state Representative from the 136th district
- Vanessa Fuentes, Austin City Council Member, District 2
- Jose "Chito" Vela, Austin City Council Member, District 4
- Paige Ellis, Austin City Council Member, District 8
- Zohaib "Zo" Qadri, Austin City Council Member, District 2
- Chuy Zàrate, Round Rock ISD Trustee, Place 1 At-Large
- Amber Landrum, Round Rock ISD Trustee, Place 3 At-Large
- Alicia Markum, Round Rock ISD Trustee, Place 4 At-Large
- Amy Weir, Round Rock ISD Trustee, Place 5 At-Large
- Steve Adler, former Mayor of Austin
- Jimmy Flannigan, former Austin City Council member, District 6

Newspapers

- The Austin Chronicle

=== City Council, District 7 ===
Incumbent Leslie Pool was ineligible for a third term, as she did not choose to collect the petition signatures required to bypass Austin's term limits.

Civil rights attorney Mike Siegel won the seat in a runoff election, defeating opponent Gary Bledsoe.

Mike Siegel

Elected officials

- Bernie Sanders, U.S. Senator from Vermont
- Greg Casar, U.S. Congressman from Texas's 35th district
- Sheryl Cole, state Representative from the 46th district
- James Talarico, state Representative from the 50th district
- José Garza, Travis County District Attorney
- Jose "Chito" Vela, Austin City Council member, District 4
- Zohaib "Zo" Qadri, Austin City Council member, District 9
- Steve Adler, former Mayor of Austin
- Pio Renteria, former Austin City Council member, District 3
- Jimmy Flannigan, former Austin City Council member, District 6
- Stephanie Gharakhanian, Austin Community College Trustee, Place 8
- Kathryn Whitley Chu, Austin ISD Trustee, District 4
- Lynn Boswell, Austin ISD Trustee, District 5
- Andrew Gonzales, Austin ISD Trustee, District 6
- Arati Singh, Austin ISD Trustee, Place 9 At-Large

Notable individuals

- Jane Fonda, actress and climate activist

Organizations

- Democratic Socialists of America
- Austin Sierra Club
- Emgage Action
- Equity Action, criminal justice reform advocacy organization that sponsored the Austin Police Oversight Act ballot initiative that was passed by voters in May 2023

Labor Unions

- AFSCME Local 1624, City of Austin and Travis County labor union
- Austin Central Labor Council, local affiliate of the AFL-CIO
- Austin EMS Association
- Austin Firefighters Association
- Education Austin
- IBEW 520
- Workers Defense Action Fund

Newspapers

- The Austin Chronicle
Gary Bledsoe

Elected officials

- Al Green, U.S. Congressman from Texas' 9th district
- Jasmine Crockett, U.S. Congressman from Texas' 30th district
- Borris Miles, State Senator from the 13th district
- Ron Reynolds, state representative from the 27th district
- Gina Hinojosa, state representative from the 49th district
- John Bucy, state representative from the 136th district

Organizations

- Black Austin Democrats
- Central Austin Democrats

Newspapers

- Austin American-Statesman
Adam Powell

Local officials

- Jose Velasquez, Austin City Councilor, District 3
- Kevin Johnson Sr., former Round Rock ISD Trustee, Place 1 At-Large
Edwin Bautista

Organizations

- Run For Something

=== City Council, District 10 ===
Incumbent Alison Alter was ineligible for a third term, as she did not choose to collect the petition signatures required to bypass Austin's term limits.

Marc Duchen narrowly defeated Ashika Ganguly in the November election.

Ashika Ganguly

Elected officials

- Garry Mauro, former Texas Land Commissioner
- Sheryl Cole, state Representative from the 46th district
- James Talarico, state Representative from the 50th district
- John Bucy III, state Representative from the 136th district
- Wendy Davis, former state Senator from the 10th district and 2014 Democratic nominee for Governor of Texas
- Eddie Rodriguez, former state Representative from the 51st district
- Jose Velasquez, Austin City Council member, District 3
- Ryan Alter, Austin City Council member, District 5
- Paige Ellis, Austin City Council member, District 8
- Zohaib "Zo" Qadri, Austin City Council member, District 9
- Sean Hassan, ACC Trustee, Place 4
- Manuel Gonzalez, ACC Trustee, Place 5
- Candace Hunter, Austin ISD Trustee, District 1
Marc Duchen

Elected Officials

- Alison Alter, Austin City Council member, District 10
- Brigid Shea, Travis County Commissioner, Precinct 2
- Stacy Suits, Travis County Constable, Precinct 3
