= 2026 Austin bar shooting =

Mass shooting in Texas, US

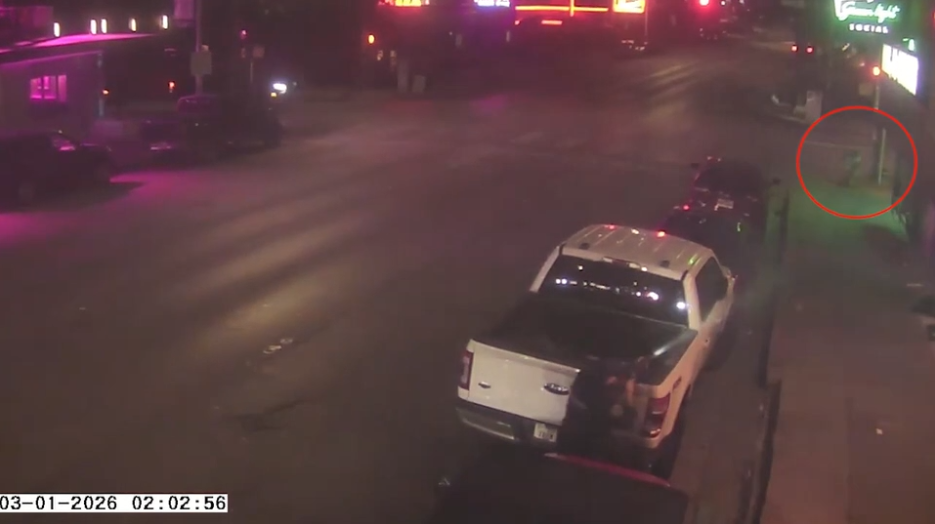
- Diagne (circled) is shot by police
- Location: 30°16′12.4″N 97°44′59.1″W; West Sixth Street, Austin, Texas, US
- Date: March 1, 2026 c. 1:58 a.m. – 2:03 a.m. (CST; UTC−06:00)
- Target: People at the bar and surrounding area
- Attack type: Mass shooting; drive-by shooting; shootout
- Weapons: AR-15–style rifle; Semi-automatic pistol
- Deaths: 4 (including the perpetrator)
- Injuries: 15
- Perpetrator: Ndiaga Diagne
- Defender: Austin Police Department
- Motive: Under investigation (possibly terrorism)

On March 1, 2026, a mass shooting occurred at Buford's Backyard Beer Garden on West Sixth Street in Downtown Austin, Texas, United States. The perpetrator, 53-year-old Senegal-born naturalized US citizen, Ndiaga Diagne, opened fire with a pistol from a vehicle at people inside and outside the bar before parking, and used an AR-15–style rifle to shoot at people along West Sixth Street and its connecting roads before he was fatally shot by police. Four people were killed, including the perpetrator, and 15 others were injured.

Diagne was wearing a "Property of Allah" hoodie and a Iran flag T-shirt during attack, which led to the shooting being investigated as a possible act of terrorism related to the 2026 Iran war, and a probe into the attack found that Diagne acted alone and had not received any support from a foreign terrorist organization.

== Background ==
The West Sixth Street district is part of downtown Austin, west of the larger Sixth Street district and bounded by Congress Avenue in the east and Mopac Expressway in the west. The area features a mix of restaurants, bars, shops, and music venues. Buford's Backyard Beer Garden, where Ndiaga Diagne first opened fire, is frequented by college and university students, and was listed as one of the top 10 best bars in Austin for college students by the Austin American-Statesman in August 2025.

In 2010, the Austin Police Department (APD) established a special unit called Counter Assault Strike Teams (CAST), after a 19-year-old fired multiple shots with an AK-47 on the campus of the University of Texas at Austin before dying by suicide earlier that year. CAST units are trained specifically to respond to active shooter incidents, and have been assigned to Austin's downtown entertainment district every Friday, Saturday, and Sunday.

In 2021, Austin launched the "Safer Sixth Street" initiative in response to a mass shooting on June 12, 2021, when a gunman opened fire in the 400 block of East Sixth Street, killing one person and injuring 13 others. The program saw brighter streetlights installed in the area, stricter enforcement against underage drinking, and established a dedicated emergency medical services (EMS) presence on Sixth Street during weekend nights. Three years later, in October 2024, Austin's city council established the Downtown Area Command in response to multiple drownings at Lady Bird Lake during events and weekends, which stationed EMS medics and vehicles downtown during the weekend and during special events.

Just over a year prior to the shooting, Sixth Street was re-opened to vehicle traffic on weekends, reversing street closures which had been put into place to accommodate heavy foot traffic. According to Austin mayor, Kirk Watson, the change had been implemented at the recommendation of EMS medics, to allow for a more effective response to mass casualty incidents.

== Shooting ==
Shortly before the shooting, Buford's Backyard Beer Garden began preparing to close, with the operators of the bar turning off the music and turning on the lights. At around 1:58 a.m., Diagne drove a black Cadillac SUV southbound on Rio Grande Street past Buford's Backyard Beer Garden, turned on the hazard lights of the vehicle and opened fire with a semi-automatic pistol on people at a patio and in front of the bar out the window of his vehicle, striking the majority of the victims in the attack. Diagne then drove westbound on West Sixth Street, before parking in a parking lot on Wood Street where he shot a man with an AR-15–style rifle in the shoulder. APD officers and Austin-Travis County Emergency Medical Services personnel arrived on the scene within 57 seconds of the first 911 calls for help.

Diagne then walked with the rifle back towards the bar, firing at people around the intersection of West Avenue and West Sixth Street. APD officers from CAST engaged with the shooter at about 2:03 a.m. at the intersection after being directed to the shooter by people in the area. Police officers shot Diagne multiple times from at least two different directions as he opened fire at officers and continued to approach the bar. Diagne fell to the ground on the sidewalk at the intersection and was pronounced dead at the scene. Emergency medical technicians, who were nearby at the time of the shooting and are also embedded in police units during peak hours in Austin's entertainment district as part of the CAST program, provided medical aid to victims within 57 seconds of the beginning of the shooting, and were later aided by the Austin Fire Department.

== Victims ==
Four people were killed, including the shooter, and 15 others were injured, including two critically. Those killed were identified as 19-year-old former Texas Tech University student Ryder Harrington, 30-year-old Minnesotan mixed martial arts fighter Jorge Pederson, and 21-year-old University of Texas at Austin student Savitha Shanmugasundaram. Harrington and Shanmugasundaram were pronounced dead at the scene, and Pederson was taken off life support a day after the shooting.

According to Austin-Travis County Emergency Medical Services (ATCEMS) chief Rob Luckritz, critically injured victims were removed from the scene within 24 minutes, and all victims were removed from the scene within 47 minutes.

== Perpetrator ==
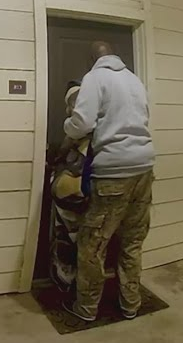
Doorbell camera still of Diagne leaving his apartment shortly before the shooting

Police identified the shooter as 53-year-old Ndiaga Diagne (c. 1973 – March 1, 2026), a Pflugerville, Texas, resident and a naturalized US citizen who had originally immigrated from Senegal. Diagne also had an apartment in Austin in the Del Valle area. Diagne previously lived in The Bronx, where he was arrested by the New York Police Department for illegal vending, and in the northeast side of San Antonio for several years. Diagne came to the United States on a tourist visa on March 13, 2000, received a green card in June 2006, and obtained US citizenship in 2013.

Law enforcement and a Texas District Court judge said that Diagne had a history of mental health conditions and a history or pattern of committing domestic violence. The judge told KXAS-TV that Diagne's ex-wife filed for divorce while residing in Bexar County in September 2022 after ten years and six months of marriage. She alleged in a petition that her husband was "guilty of cruel treatment towards Petitioner of a nature that renders living together insupportable". Online records confirmed that Diagne had been married and divorced twice. Diagne first married in The Bronx on December 30, 2005, but divorced in 2008. Diagne then married again in Manhattan in March 2012, but divorced again in September 2022.

Law enforcement records show that Diagne had a criminal history dating back to his first arrest for illegal vending on June 29, 2001, in Manhattan. On January 30, 2016, Diagne was accused of critically injuring a woman in Brooklyn after purposely running her over with a company car, which was owned by Hurricane Management Corporation, on Flatbush Avenue. That same year, Diagne moved to Texas.

In 2022, a Bexar County Sheriff's Office report said that Diagne had assaulted his then-wife by grabbing her left arm and "yanking" her out of his vehicle after she attempted to hug their child and then shoved her to the ground. She reported that Diagne had told her that he would "kill her in the city" and beat her with a steering wheel locking tool. Weeks after they divorced in September 2022, authorities in Bexar County were informed that Diagne had "contacted a crisis center in New York and made a threat to harm himself", but deputies dispatched to the address on his cell phone bill found that he no longer lived at the address.

The following year, the Pflugerville Police Department received a call from an auto shop employee that Diagne had threatened him with a firearm. Police performed a traffic stop against Diagne and searched his vehicle. Investigators did not locate a firearm, but located a gray "wheel lock". After reviewing surveillance footage of the incident, they determined that the employee's demeanor during the incident "was not indicative of someone in fear of a weapon" and declined to pursue charges.

An X account which investigators believe to be connected to the shooter was created in October 2024 and last posted in December 2025. In the posts, Diagne expressed pro-Iranian, antisemitic, anti-Christian, and misogynistic views, but did not indicate Diagne's intent to commit an attack. In April 2024, amid rising tensions between Israel and Iran, Diagne replied to a post from Iranian foreign minister, Abbas Araghchi, in which Araghchi criticized President Donald Trump and Israeli prime minister Benjamin Netanyahu, writing "THE ISLAMIC REVOLUTION IS ETERNAL ... you Zionist and islamophobes can be angry all you want but you can't do a damn thing about it no matter what [sic]". Other posts from Diagne included one in which he called Trump a "shameless clown" and another which described Netanyahu as "EVIL". In other posts, Diagne denigrated Christianity, calling the religion "fake" and using vulgar language against various foundational Christian leaders. Diagne also made several replies to far-right political activist Laura Loomer, which attacked her for her views. In October 2025, Diagne replied "Muslims worship THE ONE AND ONLY TRUE GOD" to a post which said "Muslims and Christians don't worship the same God". Two months later, Diagne replied "SPERM and have built everything in this world" to a meme which said "Women produce babies. What do men produce?".

== Aftermath ==
A Waymo driverless taxi blocked an ambulance from responding to the shooting by getting stuck blocking both lanes of traffic while attempting a u-turn. The ambulance eventually backed out from the road, and afterwards an APD officer got into the taxi and parked it inside a parking garage. ATCEMS chief Rob Luckritz said that the taxi did not impede the overall emergency response to the shooting. Waymo declined to give a statement about the incident until March 1, when the company told KVUE that they were investigating the incident. On March 11, a letter written by city council member Zohaib Qadri and co-signed by four other city council members requested that officials from Waymo attend a meeting on April 29 "to ensure stronger coordination between Waymo’s operations and Austin’s public safety agencies". The following day, city council member Paige Ellis said that Waymo had been instructed to keep their autonomous vehicles out of the area, but the company did not implement the command until approximately 30 minutes afterward. The company said that it "placed initial avoidance zones" immediately after learning of the shooting, before expanding the avoidance area after learning of "the incident's scale".

At the scheduled April 29 meeting, representatives for Waymo did not attend, but a spokesperson for the company said that it already had "substantive conversations" with city officials prior to the meeting and in a statement the company said that it would "keep working with Austin's leadership and first responder community". At the meeting, first responders highlighted problems with self-driving cars driving onto flooded roadways and bypassing train barricades and that there had been several instances where the cars would not obey officers conducting traffic, but that typically the cars followed road laws. Qadri said at the meeting that he had reached out to other autonomous vehicle companies operating in Austin and that he hoped they were "taking these lessons learned" and would continue to "work with our public safety departments".

According to the White House, President Donald Trump had been briefed on the shooting. Texas governor Greg Abbott ordered the Texas Military Department to activate service members to protect communities and critical infrastructure from potential future attacks and directed the Texas Department of Public Safety (DPS) and Texas National Guard to increase their patrols and surveillance activities. Abbott said that the mobilization was necessary to protect against any potential future attacks "as long as this war is going on". Additionally, the San Antonio Police Department (SAPD) and Bexar County Sheriff's Office announced that they were increasing patrols in high traffic areas across their jurisdiction as a precaution after the shooting, with the SAPD also citing "recent events in Iran" as a reason for the measures. The Burleson County Sheriff's Office announced that they were increasing law enforcement presence at schools in response to the shooting, but said that there was not an active threat against schools, rather just a "proactive approach" to security.

A reporter for KXAN-TV was caught on camera attempting to gain entry to Diagne's apartment in the Del Valle area of Austin after the shooting after asking his neighbor to send the station the footage from his doorbell camera of Diagne's apartment door. The neighbor reportedly called the apartment complex's front office to report the incident, believing the apartment was being broken into, before realizing that it was the journalist attempting to gain entry. KXAN-TV did not comment on the incident, saying that the station "does not comment on personnel issues", but the journalist's biography on their website was updated to say that she had left the station "in March 2026".

The owners of Buford's Backyard Beer Garden announced that they would reopen on March 6, and donate all proceeds they earned from that day to March 9 to the victims and their families. The bar said it consulted its employees, with 40 out of 41 of them saying they were prepared to return to work. The bar also said it coordinated with local police to increase their presence near the intersection where the bar is located and that the roads outside would be closed to traffic from 10 p.m. to 4 a.m. on Friday and Saturday nights. Additionally, the bar said it would install protective glass along the beer garden. On March 21, the bar posted to Instagram that it had raised approximately $35,000 in funds for the victims of the shooting.

APD assistant chief Mike Chancellor said that the quick response of the agency's CAST unit during the shooting said that other police agencies had reached out to them for advice on how to implement a similar program. Chancellor also said that the APD had been asked to present on the concept of their CAST unit at an alert center conference. APD chief Lisa Davis said in late April that the department was already in the process of designing a public safety zone for West Sixth Street prior to the shooting, and that they had now designated the public safety zone for West Sixth Street to improve response times of first responders. At the time of the shooting, East Sixth Street had its own designated public safety zone, but West Sixth Street did not, and first responders moved from East Sixth Street to the west to respond to the shooting.

=== Tesla lawsuit ===
On March 5, a 65-year-old former female co-worker of Diagne sued Tesla for allegedly failing to provide a safe environment for employees at Gigafactory Texas and conducting thorough background checks. The woman alleges that Diagne, who she had never seen before, assaulted her during a company-allowed prayer break without provocation on December 4, 2025, and that Tesla withheld his name after the assault, preventing her from filing charges against him. An attorney representing the plaintiff said that the purpose of the lawsuit was to "determine what Tesla knew and why this early incident wasn’t taken seriously" and that "If Tesla had information about Diagne’s violent behavior before he attacked" the plaintiff "and failed to act, then not only might her assault have been prevented, it may have been an early warning sign of a far greater danger". The suit also demanded that Tesla preserve all evidence relating to the alleged assault. Tesla did not comment on the lawsuit.

On April 9, Tesla requested that judge Daniella DeSeta Lyttle move the woman's case to arbitration, which would avoid a public trial. The company's lawyers argued that when the woman was hired, she agreed to out-of-court processes to resolve disputes with the company and consequently, her dispute should be handled through arbitration. The woman's lawyers argued that Tesla uses arbitration only when it suits them, telling Lyttle that Tesla cannot use arbitration "as a sword and a shield" and that Diagne's attack on the woman could amount to sexual assault. Tesla's attorney, Joshua Romero, told Lyttle that it was "absolutely true" that if the woman had been sexually assaulted it would counteract arbitration, but that it was "absurd to say it's a sexual assault case". In May, Lyttle granted Tesla's motion for arbitration, avoiding a public trial.

== Investigation ==
A bomb squad searched Ndiaga Diagne's car in the Wood Street parking lot, but found no threat. However, investigators did locate a Quran in his vehicle and, upon searching his body, found that he was wearing a sweatshirt that read "Property of Allah" with an undershirt of an Iranian flag.

The shooting is being investigated as a possible act of terrorism related to the attacks by the United States and Israel against Iran. Officials executed a search warrant at a residence of Diagne's in Pflugerville and found an Iranian flag and pictures of Iranian leaders. Agents also searched Diagne's apartment in the Del Valle area of Austin.

The FBI said that Diagne was not on their radar as a potential threat before the shooting, and a spokesperson for the FBI's San Antonio office said that the agency's "ultimate goal" was to "determine the motive". The weapons Diagne used in the attack were legally purchased in San Antonio in 2017. Texas governor Greg Abbott said that FBI agents were working in conjunction with the DPS to determine if Diagne acted alone or if he had connections to a terrorist group.

In a March 6 update, the FBI said that it had collected over 2,000 digital images, including CCTV and other camera footage, as part of their investigation into the shooting and that the media was undergoing analysis. The agency also said that it had conducted eight search warrants, which included three residential search warrants, an electronic device search warrant, and four warrants which targeted email, social media, and electronic data accounts, as well as serving 38 subpoenas.

On May 7, the FBI released a report about their criminal investigation into Diagne, indicating that there was no evidence to connect Diagne to a foreign terrorist organization, and that Diagne had acted alone and had not received any support from any other individuals or organizations. Investigators wrote that Diagne was likely motivated to carry out the attack as a result of the outbreak of war against Iran, and that Diagne was an admirer of former Iranian leader Ali Khamenei. The agency reiterated that Diagne had never been subject of investigation by them before, and that the investigation was still ongoing.

== Reactions ==
=== Government ===
==== National ====
Texas senator Ted Cruz spoke about the shooting during an interview with Margaret Brennan on Fox News' Face the Nation and said that he and his wife, Heidi, were "praying for those who were wounded and the families of those who were killed". Senator John Cornyn said that it was "a shock that something like this could happen in Austin, Texas, just literally blocks away from where I live" and that "the fact that somebody came to this country, was given a green card and became radicalized at some point, unfortunately, is a story we’ve heard before".

Representatives Greg Casar and Lloyd Doggett, who both represent parts of the city of Austin, both made calls for gun control legislation to be passed in the House of Representatives following the shooting. Casar said that he was "horrified and heartbroken" by the shooting and that "we must end America’s gun violence epidemic", and pledged to "redouble my efforts in Congress to prevent the next tragedy like this". Doggett said that he and his wife were "mourning and praying" for the victims and that gun violence was preventable and that "until Republicans find the courage to say no to the NRA, our country will be plagued with more tragedies". Representative Chip Roy, who is running for the Republican nomination for Texas attorney general, posted unconfirmed details about the shooter's immigration to the United States and subsequent naturalization, writing that the shooter had been given residency during the presidency of George W. Bush "amid GOP celebration of the joys of 'melting pot' legal immigration" and called for the immediate pause of all immigration to the United States.

Representative James Talarico, who was running for the Democratic nomination for Senate, argued with Texas governor Greg Abbott on X about the response to and cause of the shooting, with Abbott writing to Talarico, that "allowing unvetted immigrants who are hostile to America, who are loyal to our adversaries like Iran, must end" and wrote that it "was an act of terror, James" and went on to criticize Talarico's immigration policies. Talarico responded to Abbott, writing, "dangerous people should not be allowed into the country. Dangerous people should not be allowed to get guns. Texans understand this — you apparently don't".

==== State ====
Texas governor Greg Abbott released a statement offering his condolences to the victims and said that he was in contact with Austin's mayor, Kirk Watson, and the director of the DPS, Freeman Martin, concerning the incident. Abbott pledged "full support of the State of Texas" in response to the shooting.

The commissioner of the Texas Department of Agriculture (TDA), Sid Miller, posted on X after the shooting thanking Abbott for his response and stating that "As Texans, we stand together, undivided and arm-in-arm against this radical ideology which spawns such hatred" and "we mourn the dead, tend the wounded, and pray for the families, even as we harden our resolve to see our state forever liberated from this evil". A day later, through the official TDA account on X, Miller released a statement that he had "received multiple threats to my personal safety" due to "my outspoken condemnation of the Islamification of Texas and the United States" and "my righteous anger over the horrific terror attack in Austin" and that he would not be "intimidated or silenced".

==== Local ====
Watson praised the response of police officers to the shooting, stating that he was "very thankful for the speed with which our officials responded to this" and that "I don’t think there’s any question: It saved lives". City council member Zohaib Qadri, whose district includes downtown, said that he was "deeply shaken and heartbroken" and was in contact with investigators. Qadri, who is the first Muslim elected to the Austin City Council said that Muslim constituents reached out to him after the shooting fearing that they might become victims of Islamophobic violence after the shooting. Qadri also hosted a blood drive outside Austin City Hall after the shooting.

Speculation and backlash about potential charges against the officers who shot the shooter began after an attorney for the Austin Police Association (APA) posted on social media that he would represent the officers in the Travis County District Attorney's office usual grand jury review process for officer-involved shootings. The president of APA, Michael Bullock, said that the officer's situation was "an extraordinary circumstance" and that the "officers have been through enough, and anything can happen in a grand jury". Abbott released a statement on X in response to the speculation which said that "these police officers are heroes who saved lives" and that he would "have the final say in the fate of these police officers". The backlash prompted Travis County district attorney José Garza to respond to the claims that he intended to have the officers face a grand jury in a statement, which stated, "these officers are heroes, and it should go without saying that my office is not seeking any charges and would not seek charges" and that speculation about potential charges against the officers by his office were "intentionally false". Garza expressed his condolences to the victims and said that his office was "grateful for the bravery that these officers showed", and that his office was "disgusted by the leaders in Texas using their deaths to score political points".

Travis County Emergency Services' District 12 unit decorated their firetrucks with red ribbons in honor of shooting victim Ryder Harrington, in an act they dubbed "Red Bows for Ryder". Harrington was a family member of one of their fire engineers, and fire officials said that it was to show that the fire service community stands in solidarity during times of loss for their members.

=== Non-government ===
The Texas branch of the Council on American-Islamic Relations (CAIR) released a statement condemning the shooting and "all acts of unjust violence anywhere in our country and around the world, regardless of the perpetrator or the motivation". In the statement, CAIR also said it would "reject any efforts to ascribe collective blame or punishment to entire communities or faiths based on the actions of individual criminals" and said that "communities must unite in compassion and resilience, standing together for justice, understanding, and peace".

The president of the University of Texas at Austin (UT), Jim Davis, issued a letter to students after the shooting confirming the death of student Savitha Shanmugasundaram in the attack and injuries to several of their students, which said that her death was "devastating" and urged students to "lift each other up" to "find light through this darkness that presently surrounds us". Davis also wrote that he had met with several of the families of students affected by the shooting. On March 3, a vigil organized by Students Demand Action was held at Shanmugasundaram's school, UT, to honor the victims of the shooting. The Texas Indian Students Association created an endowment scholarship in honor of Shanmugasundaram with support from Shanmugasundaram's family and friends, and UT announced it would match all donations to the fund. The goal of the endowment scholarship is to raise $500,000, which would be matched by UT to fund a $1 million endowment which would fund the education of between eight and 10 Texas students who were coming to study at UT from Title I schools.

A day after the shooting, the Beta Theta Pi fraternity of Texas Tech University, where victim Ryder Harrington studied until fall 2025 and pledged to the fraternity in 2024, held a vigil for Harrington. The school released a statement after Harrington's murder, stating that the school was "saddened to learn of the tragic incident in Austin that resulted in the loss of life" and that their "thoughts are with Ryder's family, friends, and all those affected by this devastating situation".

A makeshift memorial was created outside Buford's Backyard Beer Garden, with people leaving flowers, yellow ribbons, pictures of the murdered victims, and three crosses for the murdered victims. Upon their reopening on March 6, Buford's Backyard Beer Garden announced that all proceeds from March 6–8 would be donated to the victims and their families. Additionally, other local businesses launched their own fundraising efforts for the victims, such as donating a portion of their proceeds to the victims and their families on certain days.

== See also ==
- Attacks abroad during the 2026 Iran conflict
- List of mass shootings in the United States
- List of shootings in Texas
