= Murder of Garrett Foster =

2020 murder in Austin, Texas

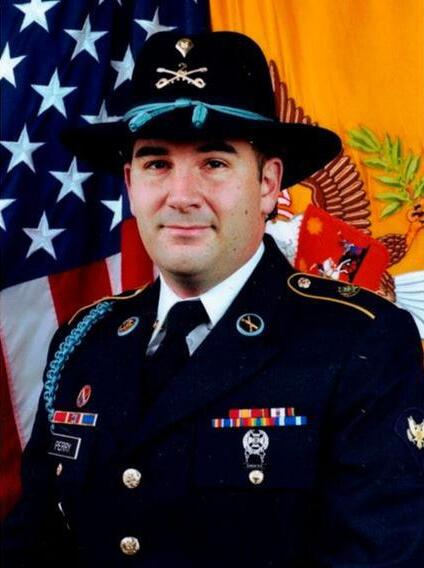
- Perry Foster
- Location: Austin, Texas, U.S.
- Date: July 25, 2020; 6 years ago
- Attack type: Murder by shooting
- Victims: Garrett Foster, aged 28
- Perpetrator: Daniel Perry
- Motive: Extremist opposition to Black Lives Matter protests
- Charges: 2023 trial: Murder; Manslaughter (lesser included offense); Aggravated assault with a deadly weapon; 2026 trial: Deadly conduct (misdemeanor)
- Verdict: 2023 trial: Guilty of murder; Not guilty of aggravated assault; 2026 trial: Not guilty of deadly conduct
- Convictions: Murder (pardoned)
- Sentence: 25 years in prison (parole possible after 12 1/2 years; released after 1 year) (Note: Perry was released from prison on May 16, 2024, following his pardon. He had served one year and one month at the time of his pardon.)

On July 25, 2020, Garrett Foster, a 28-year-old man, was murdered in Austin, Texas, by 30-year old Daniel Perry. Perry had driven into a crowd of protesters during a Black Lives Matter protest following the May 2020 police murder of George Floyd in Minneapolis, Minnesota. Foster, who had been legally open carrying an AK-47, approached Perry's vehicle, and Perry shot and killed him. Perry claimed that he had acted in self-defense, but in April 2023, a jury found him guilty of murder. He was acquitted of an aggravated assault charge. On May 10, 2023, he was sentenced to 25 years in prison for murder. Perry had made numerous posts and direct messages on social media expressing his desire to shoot protesters, which, along with statements that contradicted eyewitness accounts, brought into question his claim of self-defense.

On May 16, 2024, Texas Governor Greg Abbott pardoned Perry after recommendation by the Texas Board of Pardons and Paroles, and he was released from prison. Abbott had requested a pardon recommendation from the Board and ordered them to expedite the process. Perry was retried on charges of misdemeanor deadly conduct related to the incident and was found not guilty by a jury in 2026.

== Murder ==
On July 25, 2020, Daniel Perry, a then-30-year old United States Army sergeant, had been working his Uber shift when he encountered a protest against police brutality that was blocking the road. Perry originally stopped and honked his car horn at the protesters, but later ran a red light and drove his car into the crowd. Garrett Foster, a 28-year old white United States Air Force veteran who was legally open carrying an AK-47 walked up to Perry in an attempt to tell him to stop driving into the crowd. After he walked up to Perry's vehicle, Perry fired five shots, striking Foster four times, including three times in the torso and once in the arm, and two of the bullets left exit wounds. Perry claimed self-defense and claimed that Foster had pointed his weapon at him, but eyewitnesses contradicted this account.

When Perry was interviewed by police about what happened before the shooting and how Foster held his gun, Perry said: "I believe he was going to aim it at me ... I didn't want to give him a chance to aim at me, you know."

== Trial and conviction ==
=== Trial ===
In July 2021, nearly a year after the killing, a Travis County grand jury indicted Perry on charges of murder and aggravated assault. Perry turned himself in and was shortly released from jail on a $300,000 bond.

Perry's trial for the murder of Foster took place at the end of March 2023 to the beginning of April 2023, nearly three years after the incident. The prosecution argued that since Foster had been exercising his right to open carry, there was no justification for Perry shooting him. The prosecution revealed that Perry had made multiple posts and direct messages on social media expressing his desire to shoot Black Lives Matter protesters, writing in messages, "I might have to kill a few people on my way to work, they are rioting outside my apartment complex," and "I might go to Dallas to shoot looters." A friend of Perry's responded to him warning him of instigating protesters, stating, "We went through the same training ... Shooting after creating an event where you have to shoot, is not a good shoot." Perry had expressed his support for violence against protesters on at least three social media posts, suggesting in one post to "shoot center of mass" because "it is a bigger target", and in another stated, "Send [protesters] to Texas we will show them why we say you don't mess with Texas."

Perry had also stated that someone could shoot protesters and get away with it by claiming self-defense. Perry's defense claimed that Texas's stand-your-ground law protected him legally and that he had feared for his life, after the defense alleged that Foster had pointed his weapon at Perry. The prosecution contended that there was no evidence that Foster had pointed his weapon, and other eyewitnesses contradicted this account by the defense. The prosecution also focused on the fact that Foster's weapon was recovered with its safety on and no cartridge in the chamber, so it would not have made sense for him to point his weapon. Jurors were shown footage of Perry's police interrogation, where he said regarding Foster and how Foster held his weapon: "I believe he was going to aim it at me ... I didn't want to give him a chance to aim at me". Perry's defense stated that his autism influenced his decision to kill Foster.

On April 7, 2023, after a week of deliberations, the jury found Perry guilty of murder, but not guilty of aggravated assault, with friends and family of Perry breaking down in tears as the guilty verdict was read. Foster's father stated, "We're happy with the verdict. We're very sorry for [Perry's] family as well. There's no winners in this. Just glad it's over." Perry faced between 5 years to life in prison.

On April 13, 2023, a state district judge unsealed court records that revealed more anti-protester social media posts, racist messages, and sexually predatory online advances made by Perry that the jury did not see or hear. Among these included Perry declaring "I am a racist," and comparing the Black Lives Matter movement to "monkeys" multiple times, and also as "animals at the zoo". He also stated in a text, "To [sic] bad we can't get paid for hunting Muslims in Europe." Soon after murdering Foster, Perry searched for "degrees of murder charges". Evidence was also revealed from when Perry's phone was seized, where Perry searched on the Safari web browser "good chats to meet young girls on Kik", an app infamously known for hosting grooming, and had talked sexually with a 16-year-old girl on the app.

On May 3, 2023, Perry's request for a new trial was denied. On May 10, 2023, he was sentenced to 25 years in prison. He would have been eligible for parole in 12 1/2 years. If he served his full sentence, he would have been released in mid-2048.

== Pardon ==
Following Perry's conviction, conservative commentators and politicians urged Texas Governor Greg Abbott to pardon Perry, supporting Perry's self-defense claim. These calls for a pardon included Texas U.S. Representative Ronny Jackson. Abbott directed the Texas Board of Pardons and Paroles to consider a pardon for Perry on an expedited basis; he said, "I look forward to approving the Board's pardon recommendation as soon as it hits my desk." Under the Texas Constitution, the governor does not have the sole delegated authority to pardon. The governor may only issue a pardon after the recommendation of the Board of Pardons and Paroles.

On May 16, 2024, after Perry had served about one year and one month in prison, Governor Greg Abbott pardoned Perry while stating that "Texas has one of the strongest 'Stand Your Ground' laws of self-defense that cannot be nullified by a jury or a progressive District Attorney." The pardon was a "Full Pardon and Restoration of Full Civil Rights of Citizenship" which, in particular, restored Perry's right to own guns. Perry was released from prison on the same day as his pardon.

In June 2024, Travis County District Attorney José Garza indicated his office would file a writ of mandamus with the Texas Court of Criminal Appeals seeking to reverse the pardon, which he deems to be unlawful. Abbott responded on X saying it was within his constitutional authority to grant the pardon. The Court of Criminal Appeals dismissed Garza's writ of mandamus three weeks later.

Perry still faces a misdemeanor deadly conduct charge, which carries a maximum punishment of one year in jail. A judge ruled in January 2025 that Perry would still face trial for the deadly conduct charge. The charge concerns him allegedly endangering the pedestrians on Congress Avenue with his vehicle. In March 2026, a judge declared a mistrial during jury selection because 29 of the 50 jurors summoned indicated bias from media exposure and others were unwilling to serve on the one week trial. In October 2026, Perry was acquitted by a jury on the deadly conduct charge.

=== Reactions ===
Perry's pardon received mixed reactions among prominent Texas political figures. Texas Attorney General Ken Paxton, Republican US House Representative Chip Roy, and Texas GOP Chairman Matt Rinaldi expressed support for the pardon, while Democratic figures, including Beto O'Rourke, Texas House Representative Ron Reynolds, Texas Democratic Party Chairman Gilberto Hinojosa and U.S Representative Colin Allred opposed it. Travis County District Attorney José Garza said the decision was a "mockery of our legal system" and that the "Board and the Governor have put their politics over justice."

Foster's fiancée, Whitney Mitchell, said she was "heartbroken by this lawlessness," and that Abbott has shown that "only certain lives matter." She said in a full statement, "[Abbott] has made us all less safe. Daniel Perry texted his friends about plans to murder a protestor he disagreed with. After a lengthy trial, with an abundance of evidence, 12 impartial Texans determined he that he carried out that plan, and murdered the love of my life."

New York Attorney General Letitia James sent a letter, signed by 13 other Democratic attorneys general, to US Attorney General Merrick Garland calling for the US Department of Justice to open a civil rights investigation into Perry.
