= Austin City Council =

Unicameral legislature of Austin, Texas

Type
- Type: Unicameral

Leadership
- Mayor: Kirk Watson (D) since 2022
- Mayor Pro Tempore: Jose "Chito" Vela (D) since 2026

Structure
- Seats: 11
- Political groups: Officially nonpartisan: Democratic Party (11)

Elections
- Voting system: Two-round system
- Last election: November 5, 2024

Meeting place
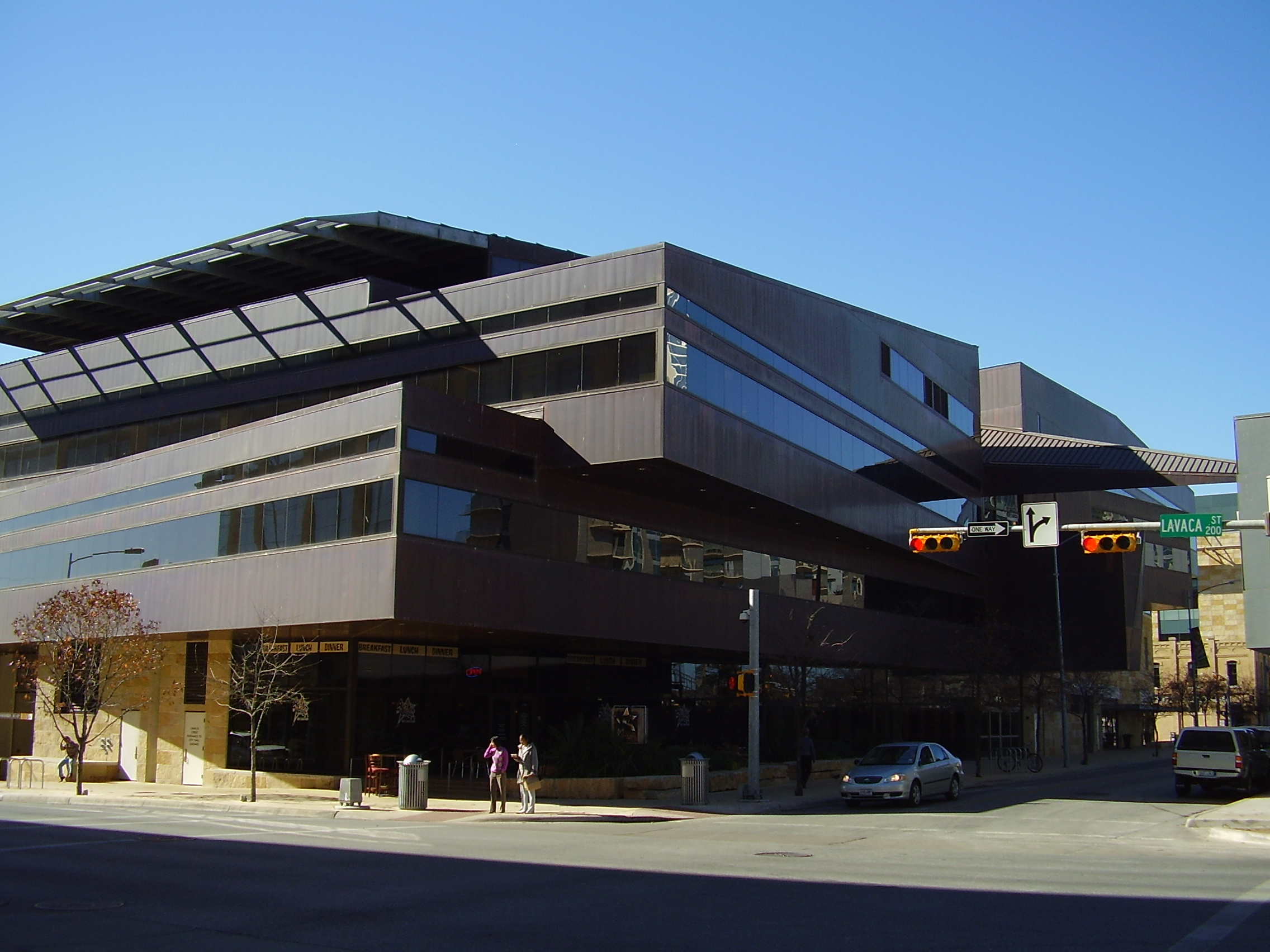
- Austin City Hall

Website
- Council Meeting Information

The Austin City Council is the unicameral legislature of the city of Austin, Texas, United States of America. The mayor is included as a member of the council and presides over all council meetings and ceremonies. The current mayor of Austin is Kirk Watson. The duty of the council is to decide the city budget, taxes, and various other ordinances. While the council is officially nonpartisan, all current council members are affiliated with the Democratic Party. District 7 council member Mike Siegel is associated with the Democratic Socialists of America.

Before 2012, the council was composed of six at-large elected members and the mayor, and members could only serve three terms (nine years) on the council. However, in 2012 the citizens of Austin approved two propositions that established ten single-member districts within the city and assigned council and mayoral seats staggered four-year terms, with members limited to two terms. However, the mayor remains as the 11th member on the council, an arrangement known as 10 to 1. The new setup was first implemented in advance of the 2014 elections, following a 2012 ballot initiative.

== Duties ==
The duty of the Austin City Council is to oversee and decide on the city budget, local taxes, amendment of laws, and creation of ordinances and policies. The council members meet every Thursday. There are several boards and commissions that are composed of non-elected appointed citizens to give advice and recommendations to council members. These board generally review, debate, and comment on recommendations for the council. At the start of each term, Council elects a Mayor Pro Tempore from its members, usually serving 1 to 2 years. While largely a symbolic title, the Mayor Pro Tempore is in charge of running meetings upon the absence of the mayor. The current Mayor Pro Tempore is Vanessa Fuentes, elected on January 6, 2025.

== Members ==
Members of the council are elected to 4 years terms and can serve a maximum of 2 terms. The current council was elected in 2022 and 2024. The council is officially nonpartisan; however, all current council members and the mayor are affiliated with the Democratic Party. District 7 council member Mike Siegel is associated with the Democratic Socialists of America.

District	Name	Party (officially nonpartisan)	Term start	Location	References
Mayor	Kirk Watson	Democratic	January 6, 2023	Citywide	
1	Natasha Harper-Madison	Democratic	January 7, 2019	East Austin (North), Harris Branch, MLK	
2	Vanessa Fuentes	Democratic	January 6, 2021	Southeast Austin, Airport, South End of Congress	
3	José Velásquez	Democratic	January 6, 2023	East Austin (South), Montopolis, St. Edwards/Elmo	
4	Jose "Chito" Vela	Democratic	February 4, 2022	North Central Austin, Highland, Rundberg	
5	Ryan Alter	Democratic	January 6, 2023	South Lamar, Menchaca, Westgate	
6	Krista Laine	Democratic	January 6, 2025	Northwest Austin, Lakeline, Lake Travis	
7	Mike Siegel	Democratic	January 6, 2025	North Austin, Burnet Road, The Domain	
8	Paige Ellis	Democratic	January 7, 2019	Southwest Austin, Oak Hill, Circle C	
9	Zohaib "Zo" Qadri	Democratic	January 6, 2023	Downtown, Central Austin, South Congress	
10	Marc Duchen	Democratic	January 6, 2025	West Austin, Tarrytown, Northwest Hills	

=== Notable past members ===
- Emma Long (1948–1959, 1963–1969) The first woman elected to serve on the Austin city council. Emma Long Metropolitan Park was named in her honor.
- Hub Bechtol (1959)
- Greg Casar (D), U.S. Representative from the 35th District (2023–present)
- Sheryl Cole (D), State Representative from the 46th District (2019–present)
- Lee Cooke (R), Mayor of Austin (1988–1991)
- Jimmy Flannigan (D), Austin council member (2017–2021), first openly gay male city council member in Austin history
- Gustavo L. "Gus" Garcia (D), Mayor of Austin (2001–2003)
- Delia Garza (D), Travis County Attorney (2021–present)
- Jackie Goodman, Austin council member (1993-2005); Mayor Pro Tem (1998-2000)
- Ann Kitchen (D), State Representative from the 48th District (2001–2003)
- Ron Mullen, Mayor of Austin (1983–1985)
- Brigid Shea (D), Travis County Commissioner (2017–present)
- Randi Shade (D), Austin council member (2008–2011), first openly gay city council member in Austin history
- Homer Thornberry (D), U.S. Representative from the 10th District (1949–1963)
- John Treviño Jr. (D), Austin council member (1975–1988), first Mexican-American city council member in Austin history
- Ellen Troxclair (R), State Representative from the 19th District (2023–present)

== Election results ==
=== 2024 ===
Austin City Council 2024 election summary
Party (officially nonpartisan)	Seats	Gains	Losses	Net gain/loss
Democratic	10	1	1	Steady
Democratic Socialists of America	1	1	0	▲1
Republican	0	0	1	▼1

City of Austin, Mayor
Party	Candidate	Votes	%	±%
Democratic	Kirk Watson	166,890	50.05	−0.35
Democratic	Carmen Llanes Pulido	68,042	20.40	
Democratic	Kathie Tovo	55,715	16.71	
Nonpartisan election	Jeffery Bowen	27,055	8.11	
Democratic	Doug Greco	15,768	4.73	
Total votes		333,470	100.00	
Democratic hold				

City of Austin, District 2
Party	Candidate	Votes	%	±%
Democratic	Vanessa Fuentes	22,591	85.67	+29.61
Republican	Robert Reynolds	3,780	14.33	
Total votes		26,371	100.00	
Democratic hold				

City of Austin, District 4
Party	Candidate	Votes	%	±%
Democratic	José "Chito" Vela	11,034	58.52	−0.68
Democratic	Monica Guzmán	5,223	27.70	+13.95
Republican	Louis Herrin	1,149	6.09	
Republican	Jim Rabuck	819	4.34	
Democratic	Eduardo "Lalito" Romero	630	3.34	
Total votes		18,855	100.00	
Democratic hold				

City of Austin, District 6
Party	Candidate	Votes	%	±%
Democratic	Krista Laine	6,230	51.60	
Republican	Mackenzie Kelly	5,843	48.40	−5.89
Total votes		12,073	100.00	
Democratic gain from Republican				

City of Austin, District 7
Party	Candidate	Votes	%
Democratic Socialists of America	Mike Siegel	13,681	39.83
Democratic	Gary Bledsoe	6,624	19.28
Democratic	Pierre Huy Nguyễn	5,110	14.88
Democratic	Adam Powell	3,828	11.14
Democratic	Todd Shaw	2,973	8.65
Democratic	Edwin Bautista	2,135	6.22
Total votes		34,351	100.00
Runoff election
Democratic Socialists of America	Mike Siegel	4,402	51.20
Democratic	Gary Bledsoe	4,196	48.80
Total votes		8,598	100.00
Democratic Socialists of America gain from Democratic			

City of Austin, District 10
Party	Candidate	Votes	%
Democratic	Marc Duchen	20,810	50.59
Democratic	Ashika Ganguly	20,321	49.41
Total votes		41,131	100.00
Democratic hold			

=== 2022 ===
Austin City Council 2022 election summary
Party (officially nonpartisan)	Seats	Gains	Losses	Net gain/loss
Democratic	10	1	0	▲1
Republican	1	0	0	Steady
Democratic Socialists of America	0	0	1	▼1

City of Austin, Mayor
Party	Candidate	Votes	%
Democratic	Celia Israel	122,377	40.01
Democratic	Kirk Watson	106,883	34.94
Republican	Jennifer Virden	56,313	16.71
Nonpartisan election	Phil Campero Brual	7,340	2.39
Nonpartisan election	Anthony Bradshaw	7,137	2.33
Nonpartisan election	Gary Spellman	5,815	1.90
Total votes		305,865	100.00
Runoff election
Democratic	Kirk Watson	57,565	50.41
Democratic	Celia Israel	56,623	49.58
Total votes		114,188	100.00
Democratic hold			

City of Austin, District 4 special election
Party	Candidate	Votes	%
Democratic	José "Chito" Vela	2,141	59.24
Democratic	Monica Guzmán	497	13.75
Nonpartisan	Jade Lovera	402	11.23
Republican	Amanda Rios	349	9.65
Democratic	Melinda Schiera	175	4.84
Nonpartisan election	Isa Boonto-Zarifis	33	0.91
Nonpartisan election	Ramesses II Setepenre	17	0.47
Total votes		3,614	100.00
Democratic gain from Democratic Socialists of America			

City of Austin, District 3
Party	Candidate	Votes	%
Democratic	José Velásquez	7,674	36.39
Democratic	Daniela Silva	7,260	34.43
Democratic	José Noé Elias	2,318	10.99
Republican	Yvonne Weldon	1,947	9.23
Democratic	Gavino Fernandez Jr.	1,078	5.11
Republican	Esala Wueschner	806	3.82
Total votes		21,083	100.00
Runoff election
Democratic	José Velásquez	4,181	53.39
Democratic	Daniela Silva	3,649	46.60
Total votes		7,830	100.00
Democratic hold			

== History ==
The City of Austin was officially incorporated by the Fourth Congress of the Republic of Texas on December 27, 1839. The city was established at the confluence of the Colorado River and Shoal Creek, which was then the site of a small community known as Waterloo. The city was founded to act as the capital of the Republic of Texas and was named in honor of Stephen F. Austin, the so-called Founder of Texas. The governmental structure established by the original Austin charter called for "one mayor, and eight Aldermen", with the mayor being elected city-wide, and each Alderman representing one of the city's eight wards. Austin had its first mayoral election on January 13, 1840, in which citizens elected Edwin Waller to be the city's first mayor.

== Districts ==
=== District 1 ===
Austin's 1st City Council district
- Country: United States
- State: Texas
- City: East Austin

Government
  - Councilmember: Natasha Harper-Madison

Population (2020)
  - Total: 93,992

Demographics
  - Hispanic: 39.42%
  - White: 29.47%
  - Black: 19.86%
  - Asian: 7.41%

The Austin City Council 1st district covers east Austin. The current councillor is Natasha Harper-Madison who has represented the district since 2019. She is a member of the Democratic Party.

List of city councillors from District 1
Assumed office	Left office	District 1	Party affiliation
January 2015	January 2019	Ora Houston	Democratic
January 2019	Incumbent	Natasha Harper-Madison	Democratic

=== District 2 ===
The Austin City Council 2nd district covers southeast Austin, including Dove Springs, Bluff Springs, and the Austin Bergstrom International Airport.

The current councillor is Vanessa Fuentes, who has represented the district since 2021. She is a member of the Democratic Party.

On January 6, 2025, she was elected by council to serve as Mayor Pro Tempore for the duration of 2025.

List of city councillors from District 2
Assumed office	Left office	District 2	Party affiliation
January 2015	January 2021	Delia Garza	Democratic
January 2021	Incumbent	Vanessa Fuentes	Democratic

=== District 3 ===
The Austin City Council '3rd district covers east and south Austin.

The current councillor is Jose Velasquez, who has represented the district since 2023. He is a member of the Democratic Party.

List of city councillors from District 3
Assumed office	Left office	District 3	Party affiliation
January 2015	January 2023	Pio Renteria	Democratic
January 2023	Incumbent	Jose Velasquez	Democratic

=== District 4 ===
The Austin City Council 4th district covers north Austin.

In February 2022, Councillor Greg Casar resigned his seat to run for Congress.

The current councillor is Jose "Chito" Vela, who has represented the district since February 2022. He is a member of the Democratic Party.

On January 6, 2025, he was elected by council to serve as Mayor Pro Tempore for the duration of 2026.

List of city councillors from District 4
Assumed office	Left office	District 4	Party affiliation
January 2015	February 4, 2022	Greg Casar	Democratic Socialists of America^{Left in 2022}
February 4, 2022	Incumbent	Jose "Chito" Vela	Democratic

=== District 5 ===
The Austin City Council 5th district covers south Austin.

The current councillor is Ryan Alter, who has represented the district since 2023. He is a member of the Democratic Party.

List of city councillors from District 5
Assumed office	Left office	District 5	Party affiliation
January 2015	January 2023	Ann Kitchen	Democratic
January 2023	Incumbent	Ryan Alter	Democratic

=== District 6 ===
The Austin City Council 6th district covers northwest Austin including portions of the city within Williamson County.

The current councillor is Krista Laine, who has represented the district since January 6, 2025. She is a member of the Democratic Party.

List of city councillors from District 6
Assumed office	Left office	District 6	Party affiliation
January 2015	January 2017	Don Zimmerman	Republican
January 2017	January 2021	Jimmy Flannigan	Democratic
January 2021	January 2025	Mackenzie Kelly	Republican
January 2025	Incumbent	Krista Laine	Democratic

=== District 7 ===
The Austin City Council 7th district covers north Austin including Crestview, Allendale, and Shoal Creek.

The current councillor is Mike Siegel, who has represented the district since January 6, 2025. He is a member of the Democratic Party, as well as the Democratic Socialists of America.

List of city councillors from District 7
Assumed office	Left office	District 7	Partisan Affiliation
January 2015	January 2025	Leslie Pool	Democratic
January 2025	Incumbent	Mike Siegel	Democratic Socialists of America

=== District 8 ===
The Austin City Council 8th district covers southwest Austin, including Zilker Park, Barton Creek, and Oak Hill.

The current councillor is Paige Ellis, who has represented the district since 2019. She was re-elected in 2022 with over 60% of the vote. She is a member of the Democratic Party.

List of city councillors from District 8
Assumed office	Left office	District 8	Party affiliation
January 2015	January 2019	Ellen Troxclair	Republican
January 2019	Incumbent	Paige Ellis	Democratic

=== District 9 ===
The Austin City Council 9th district covers central Austin, including Downtown, The University of Texas, Travis Heights, Hyde Park, and Mueller.

The current councillor is Zohaib "Zo" Qadri, who has represented the district since 2023. He is a member of the Democratic Party.

List of city councillors from District 9
Assumed office	Left office	District 9	Party affiliation
January 2015	January 2023	Kathie Tovo	Democratic
January 2023	Incumbent	Zohaib "Zo" Qadri	Democratic

=== District 10 ===
The Austin City Council 10th district covers west Austin, including Tarrytown, Bryker Woods, Northwest Hills, and River Place.

The current councillor is Marc Duchen, who has represented the district since January 6, 2025. He is a member of the Democratic Party.

List of city councillors from District 10
Assumed office	Left office	District 9	Partisan Affiliation
January 2015	January 2017	Sheri Gallo	Republican
January 2017	January 2025	Alison Alter	Democratic
January 2025	Incumbent	Marc Duchen	Democratic

== See also ==
- Mayor of Austin
- Austin City Hall (Austin, Texas)
