= Texas's 19th House of Representatives district =

American legislative district

Texas's 19th State House of Representatives district
Representative
Ellen Troxclair; R
- Demographics: 72.8% White; 2.0% Black; 19.0% Hispanic; 3.5% Asian
- Population (2020) • Voting age: 202,995; 159,395

The 19th district of the Texas House of Representatives contains parts of Fredericksburg, Marble Falls, and Burnet. It contains the entirety of Burnet County. The current representative is Ellen Troxclair, who has represented the district since 2023.
