= Greg Casar =

American politician (born 1989)

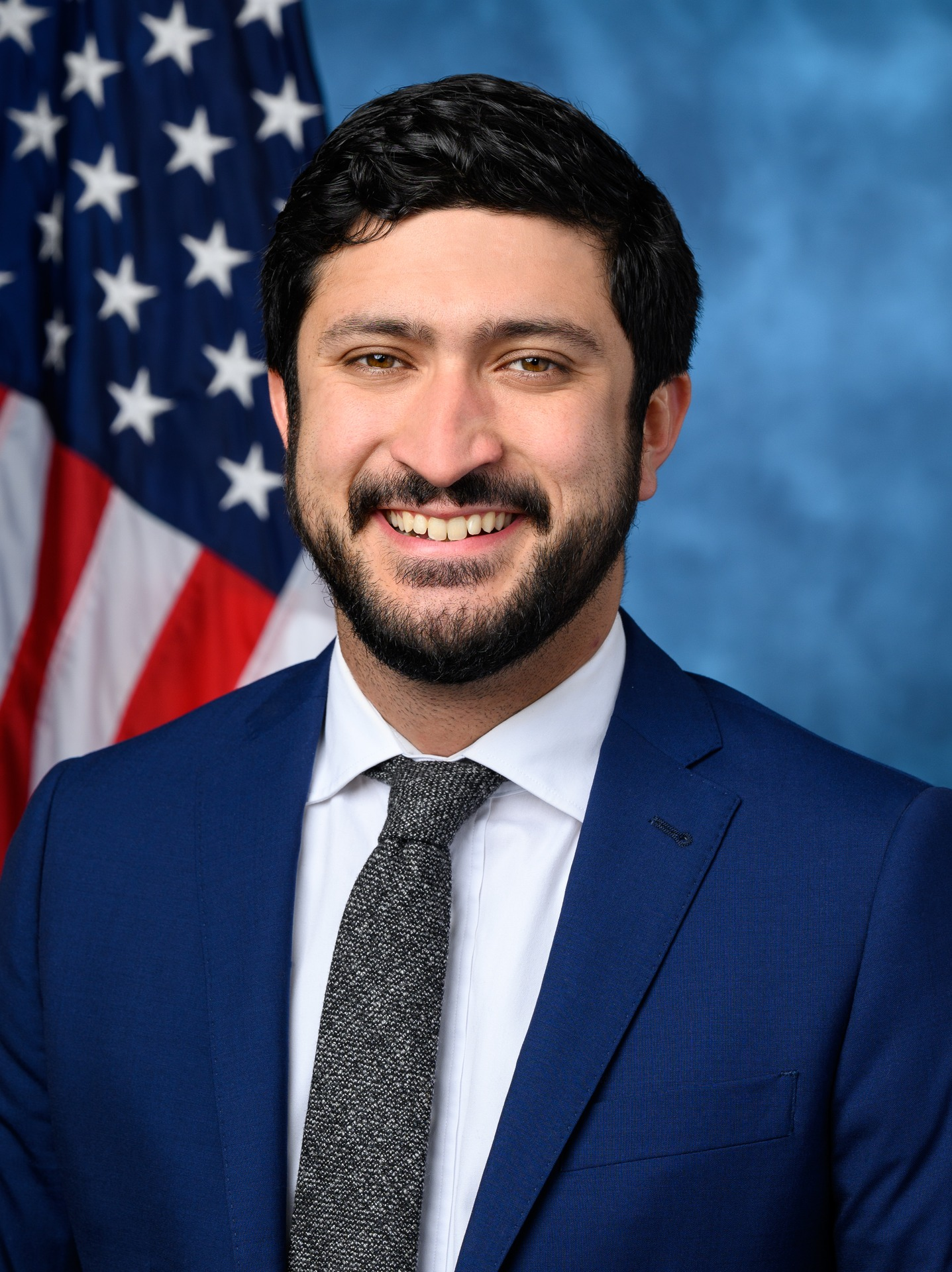
- Official portrait, 2023

Chair of the Congressional Progressive Caucus
- Incumbent
- Assumed office January 3, 2025
- Preceded by: Pramila Jayapal

Member of the U.S. House of Representatives from Texas's 35th district
- Incumbent
- Assumed office January 3, 2023
- Preceded by: Lloyd Doggett (redistricted)

Member of the Austin City Council from the 4th district
- In office January 6, 2015 – February 4, 2022
- Preceded by: Constituency established
- Succeeded by: Chito Vela

Personal details
- Born: Gregorio Eduardo Casar; May 4, 1989 (age 37) Houston, Texas, U.S.
- Party: Democratic
- Other political affiliations: Democratic Socialists of America (2018–2022)
- Spouse: Asha Dane'el (m. 2023)
- Children: 1
- Education: University of Virginia (BA)
- Website: House website Campaign website

Gregorio Eduardo Casar (born May 4, 1989) is an American politician serving as a U.S. representative from Texas's 35th congressional district since 2023. He served as a member of the Austin City Council from the 4th district from 2015 to 2022. Casar is a member of the Democratic Party and was endorsed by the Working Families Party in his run for Congress. He was first elected to the Austin City Council in 2014, representing District 4. He was reelected in 2016 and 2020. He was elected to Congress in 2022.

Casar is the chair of the Congressional Progressive Caucus. He is a member of the Squad, which includes six other members who form the furthest-left wing faction of the House Democratic Caucus.

On August 25, 2025, Casar announced he would seek reelection in the newly-drawn 37th district, instead of his current 35th district, as a result of impending new congressional maps.

== Early life and education ==
Gregorio Eduardo Casar was born on May 4, 1989, in Houston, to two Mexican immigrants and is a Catholic. His father was a surgeon. He grew up in the enclave of Bellaire and attended Strake Jesuit College Preparatory, where he ran track. Casar then earned a Bachelor of Arts degree in political science and social thought from the University of Virginia in 2011. He began his activism in college, organizing with Students and Workers United for a Living Wage, which called for the university to pay its workers a living wage.

== Early career ==
=== Workers Defense Project ===
Before running for office, Casar worked as policy director for the Workers Defense Project (Proyecto Defensa Laboral), where he won victories such as rest and water breaks for construction workers, living wage requirements, and against wage theft.

In 2011, he led the Workers Defense Project efforts to require that construction workers be allowed to take rest and water breaks: ten minutes for each four hours worked, and no more than 3.5 hours without a break. Casar also organized against major corporations, including White Lodging, and successfully led the fight to include living wage and other labor protections in an incentives deal the Austin City Council planned to give to Apple.

== Austin City Council ==
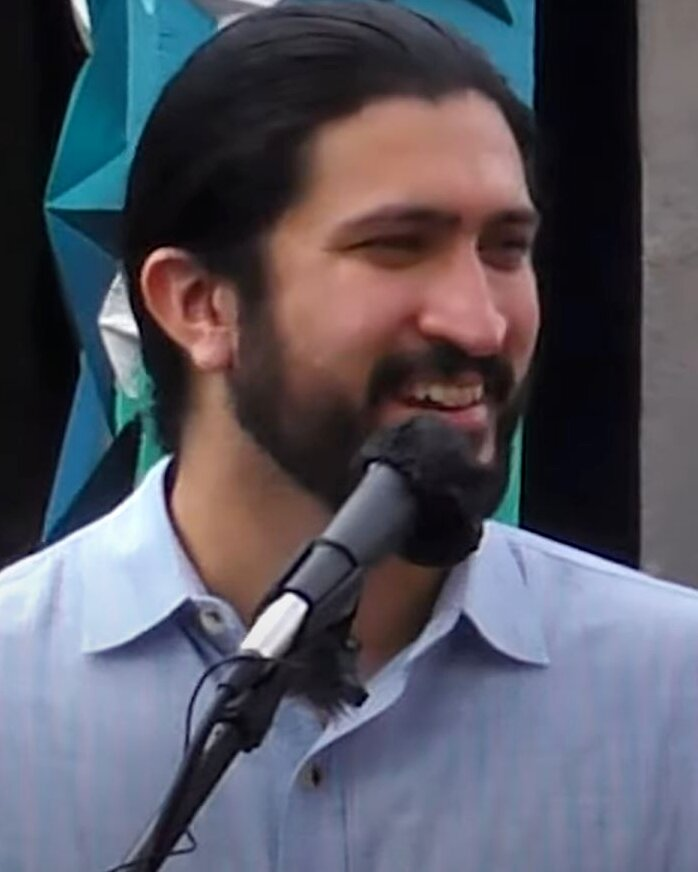
Casar at a press conference in 2021

=== Elections ===
==== 2014 ====
In 2014, Austin had its first election with geographic, single-member districts to elect City Council members, instead of an at-large election. Casar finished first in the election, but went into a runoff against Laura Pressley, an anti-fluoride activist. Casar won the runoff, but Pressley sued to contest the results, claiming ballot irregularities. In 2019, the Supreme Court of Texas rejected her final appeal.

==== 2016 ====
In 2016, Casar was reelected to Austin City Council in the same election in which Donald Trump was elected president. When asked by the Austin-American Statesman whether he would shake hands with President Trump, he responded "Hell no." The day after Election Day, Casar wrote, "Lots of people, including Donald Trump, are calling for healing and unity today. I won't call for healing. I'm calling for resistance."

==== 2020 ====
In 2020, Casar was elected for a third time to the Austin City Council. In November 2020, Austin Monthly published "Why Gregorio Casar is the Future of Texas Politics." Casar considered running for the Texas Senate seat held by retiring Kirk Watson, but ultimately did not enter the race.

=== Tenure ===
As an Austin City Council member, Casar led policy efforts on issues ranging from affordable housing, paid sick leave, living wage increases, tenant organizing, immigrant rights, criminal justice reforms (such as "ban the box"), and police accountability. He was the first person to represent Austin's District 4, the city's most diverse district. It has the most young children, and in 2024, reported a 72.6% nonwhite population. Most of its constituents are Latino, and it has the second largest African American population of Austin's ten council districts. It also has the highest poverty rate. By Casar's estimation, 30 percent of his District 4 constituents were undocumented immigrants.

Casar served as the board chair of Local Progress, a project of the Center for Popular Democracy, "the national network of progressive elected officials from cities, counties, towns, school districts, villages and other local governments across the country."

Casar announced his resignation on November 4, 2021, effective February 4, 2022, when he announced his run for the U.S. House of Representatives in the 35th district.

== U.S. House of Representatives ==
=== Elections ===
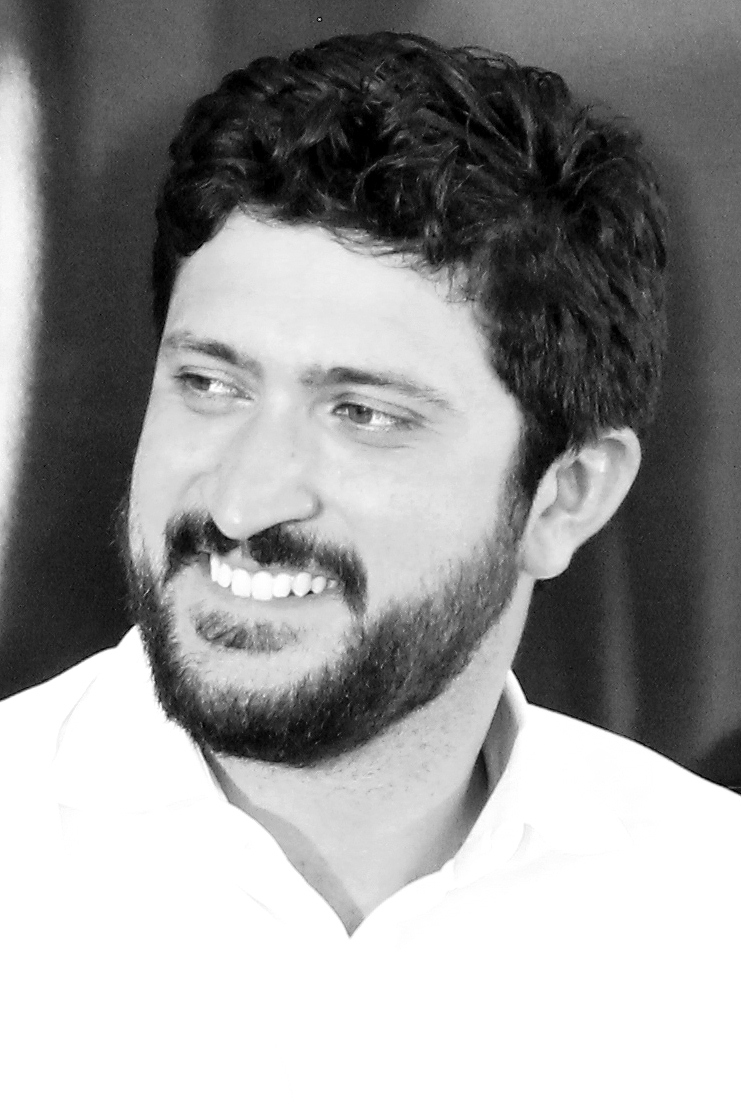
Casar at a candidate forum in September 2022

==== 2022 ====
On November 4, 2021, Casar announced his candidacy for Texas's 35th congressional district. During the primary, he was endorsed by prominent national progressives, including senators Bernie Sanders and Elizabeth Warren and Representative Alexandria Ocasio-Cortez, as well as Austin officials such as Mayor Steve Adler and Travis County district attorney José Garza. Casar joined the Squad, which includes Ocasio-Cortez and five other members who form the furthest-left wing faction of the House Democratic Caucus.

Casar won the Democratic primary on March 1, 2022, with approximately 60% of the vote. In his victory speech, he linked his victory to the overall progressive movement, saying, "This election was about us, the power of the people and the power of our movement. Let's celebrate the progressive movement in Texas". Given the 35th district's partisan lean of D+21, Casar's primary victory was considered tantamount to election. The Texas Tribune wrote that he is expected to be "among the most progressive members of Congress ever to serve from Texas".

On November 8, 2022, Casar won the general election, defeating the Republican nominee, former Corpus Christi mayor Dan McQueen, with 73% of the vote.

=== Tenure ===
Casar was among the 46 Democrats who voted against final passage of the Fiscal Responsibility Act of 2023 in the House. On July 25, 2023, Casar led a thirst strike advocating for better heat protection after a law passed in Texas overrode local ordinances such as water and rest breaks. The strike lasted for nine hours and Casar took no breaks nor did he eat or drink.

=== Caucus memberships ===
- Congressional Equality Caucus
- Congressional Freethought Caucus
- Congressional Hispanic Caucus
- Congressional Progressive Caucus

=== Committee assignments ===
Current

- Committee on Education and Workforce (Vice Ranking Member)
  - Subcommittee on Health, Employment, Labor, and Pensions
  - Subcommittee on Workforce Protections
- Committee on Oversight and Government Reform
  - Subcommittee on Military and Foreign Affairs
  - Subcommittee on Delivering on Government Efficiency

Past

- Committee on Agriculture (118th Congress)
  - Subcommittee on Commodity Exchanges, Energy, and Credit
  - Subcommittee on Nutrition and Foreign Agriculture

== Political positions ==
=== Criminal justice reform ===
==== Ban the box ====
In 2016, Casar led efforts at City Hall to "ban the box" through a fair chance hiring ordinance. The ordinance delays when employers can do a criminal background check until after a conditional job offer has been made, in order to help reintegrate former prisoners into the workplace and deter employment discrimination. Austin became the first city to ban the box in the Southern United States.

==== Freedom City ====
Because of Texas Senate Bill 4's limitations on sanctuary cities, and in an effort to reduce the impact of low-level interactions with police, Casar initiated policy changes to make Austin a "Freedom City", which discourages the police from making low-level discretionary arrests and requires police officers to inform residents that they have the right to refuse to answer questions about immigration status. During the debate, the Austin Police Association attacked Casar for citing data that Black residents are arrested twice as often as white residents in discretionary arrests. Casar wrote in a Texas Tribune editorial that the Freedom City law's intention is to unite immigration reformers and criminal justice reformers to reduce the disparate impact of policing on communities of color. In the first quarter after the policy passed, arrests for ticket-worthy offenses dropped by two-thirds. Racial disproportionality of arrests also improved.

==== Juvenile curfew ====
In June 2017, Casar and Delia Garza pushed the council to eliminate criminal penalties for a juvenile to "walk, run, idle, wander, stroll, or aimlessly drive" during curfew hours, out of a belief that kids should not be pushed into the criminal justice system for being young and out in public. Many of these laws, including Austin's, were passed during Clinton Administration's "tough on crime" phase in the 1990s. Ultimately, the council removed the juvenile curfew. Austin became the nation's second-largest city to end its juvenile curfew policy.

==== Police reform ====
When the Austin police union contract was set to expire in early 2017, criminal justice activists called for reform, citing examples in the contract that made police oversight difficult. Casar, Jimmy Flannigan, and other Council members indicated their intent to reject the contract and send the union back to the bargaining table unless it was reformed. After the contract was rejected, the police union requested bonus pay without a contract in place, but that was opposed by a divided council. After nearly ten months of negotiations, a new contract was approved, along with the creation of an independent office of police oversight. The new contract made it easier to file complaints, provided more transparency around complaints of police misconduct, strengthened police disciplinary procedures, and increased accountability.

In 2020, following the murder of George Floyd, Black Lives Matter protests reached Austin. During the protests, Austin police were involved in use of force incidents where civilians were injured. Casar called for more oversight. Working with community leaders, he crafted a three-tiered plan to reduce the police department budget. Austin became one of the only cities in the nation to successfully begin reallocating significant funding from its police department to other city programs.

The council voted unanimously to eliminate upcoming cadet classes in the police academy, diverting $20 million to programs that address homelessness, mental health, and family violence prevention. During the year after the budget vote, another $80 million will be reallocated from the department by placing some functions, such as forensics and 911 dispatch, within other parts of the city's government. The council also flagged another $50 million for "community-led" review.

=== Economic policy ===
In July 2025, Casar introduced legislation to outlaw surveillance pricing. In March 2026, Casar and senator Chris Murphy introduced a bill to ban prediction market bets ‌on military operations and government actions. Casar and senator Bernie Sanders introduced a bill to end prohibitions on public ownership of professional sports teams and requires team owners aiming to relocate a team to give the local community one year to purchase a team.

=== Foreign policy ===
In 2023, Casar was among 56 Democrats to vote in favor of H.Con.Res. 21, which had it passed would have directed President Joe Biden to remove U.S. troops from Syria within 180 days.

In February 2024, he penned a letter to the Biden administration, outlined significant issues regarding the 2024 Pakistani general election and urged them to refrain from recognizing the coalition government.

==== Iran ====
In February 2026, Casar opposed Trump's initial strikes in the 2026 Iran war. He said, "Congress must do everything in its power to stop Trump's illegal war, including reconvening for an immediate vote on a War Powers Resolution." Casar has subsequently supported war powers resolutions regarding the Iran war, and he has opposed congressional funding for the Iran war.

==== Israel and Palestine ====
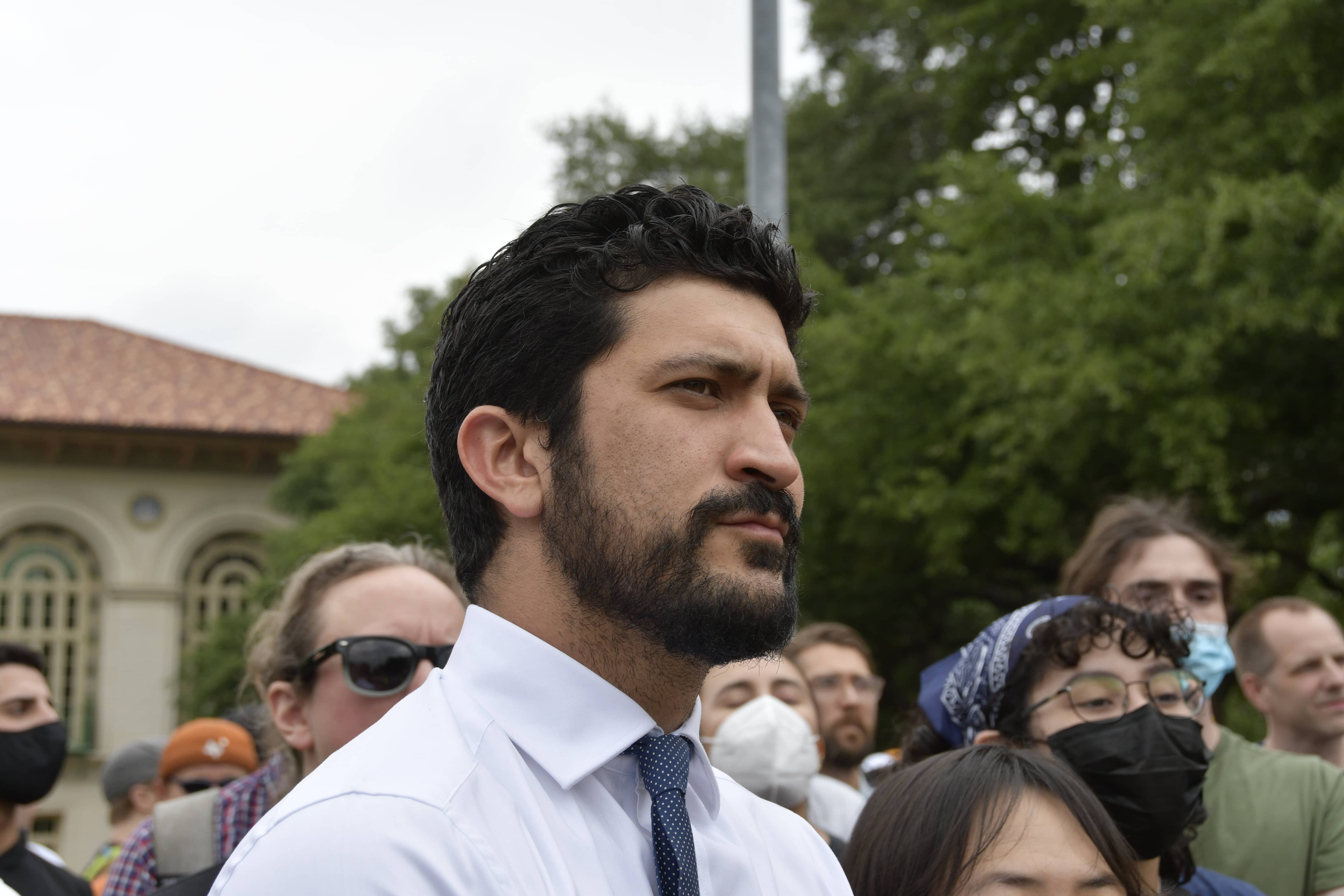
Casar attends a protest over the Gaza war at the University of Texas at Austin on April 25, 2024.

Casar expressed in 2021 that he believed the "[Israeli] occupation needs to end" and that US aid in supporting Israeli occupation of Palestinian territories should end, identifying his positions with those of Senator Bernie Sanders. Casar in 2022 wrote in Jewish Insider that he believes the people of Israel and Palestine both deserve to live in "peace and security", and that the "clearest path" toward achieving that goal was through a two-state solution. He has also said he does not support the Boycott/Divestment/Sanctions (BDS) movement against Israel. Casar was a member of the Democratic Socialists of America from 2018 to 2022. Austin Democratic Socialists of America initially supported Casar's campaign for Congress, although Austin DSA withdrew endorsement over Casar's support for Israel, and Casar's campaign also requested DSA to rescind endorsement. Before the October 7 attack on Israel by Hamas, Casar stated he supported "continued federal aid for self defense of Israel". However, after the Israeli bombardment of Gaza began in 2023, Casar has been a proponent of an immediate ceasefire and has been opposed to offensive military aid for Israel.

Casar co-sponsored the Ceasefire Now Resolution introduced by Representative Cori Bush in October 2023. Following his vote against H.R. 8034, the Israel Security Supplemental Appropriations Act, on April 20, 2024, Casar signed a statement along with 18 other House members denouncing the supply of offensive military aid to Israel as an act that "could result in more killings of civilians in Rafah and elsewhere." The statement pled for the United States to rather help achieve a ceasefire to allow for the freeing of hostages, the delivery of humanitarian aid, and the beginning of peace talks.

=== Housing ===
==== Affordable housing ====
During the 2018 election cycle, the Austin City Council put almost $1 billion of bond propositions to the voters, including Proposition A, which allocated $250 million to build affordable housing and acquire land to build it on. The Democratic Socialists of America, AURA, and other community groups joined Casar in pushing for a $300 million bond after the city's staff proposed less than $100 million. Through community engagement and work at City Hall, Casar pushed the bond proposition up to $250 million. He said at the time, "From social housing to public housing to mixed-income subsidized units, all of that is on the table for us right now." After a large campaign, Proposition A passed with the support of over 70% of voters, the largest affordable housing bond in Austin's history.

In an effort to extend the reach of Proposition A's $250 million for affordable housing, Casar proposed an "Affordability Unlocked" ordinance. The ordinance waives or reduces many zoning regulations, like parking requirements, setbacks, occupancy limits, and minimum lot sizes, and allows buildings to be built taller, in exchange for reserving 50% of the new homes in the building for low-income renters or homeowners by the developer. The ordinance also requires that in existing aging multifamily buildings, homes that are already affordable to renters must be replaced on a one-to-one basis to avoid encouraging the teardown of existing homes for low-income renters. Casar cited the ordinance as an example of his approach to housing politics in an op-ed, writing that "our pro-housing and anti-gentrification movements can co-exist" and that building more housing does not have to mean displacing low-income renters because housing can be built elsewhere in the city to avoid displacement and gentrification. The ordinance has allowed for the construction of at least 650 housing units that otherwise would not have been possible without the lifting of height and parking requirements.

==== Granny flats ====
Throughout 2015, Casar and his colleague Sabino "Pio" Renteria pushed for housing reforms to allow more "granny flats" or garage apartments ("accessory dwelling units," or ADUs) to be built in Austin. The reforms ultimately allowed an additional home on most legal lots in the city, and waived minimum parking requirements if they were built near transit. Casar saw the issue as advancing fair housing in the city, and AURA, a housing and transportation advocacy group, cited it as a way to integrate the city. He described his motivation as "a moral imperative ... We are sick of being on the list of the most segregated communities in this country."

==== Tenant organizing ====
After organizing with mobile home residents of the Stonegate Mobile Home park against mismanagement, Casar joined a march to the manager's office to demand that an ill resident's electricity be restored. Within 24 hours of the march, it was restored. In early 2015, after hearing of the successful campaign at Stonegate, Casar received reports from North Lamar Community Mobile Home Park that the new owner had raised rent and utility costs. He helped the tenants to form a tenants' association, Asociación de los Residentes de North Lamar (ARNL), through which the tenants organized a housing co-operative to buy and own their park.

ARNL organized with Casar and Texas RioGrande Legal Aid to sue the new owner, Frank Rolfe, who had raised rents by 10-25%. Rolfe, who teaches others how to invest in mobile homes, has compared owning mobile home parks to owning a "Waffle House where everyone is chained to the booths". He has also said, "At $3,000 or so to move a mobile home, there is a huge barrier to moving out, so tenants will accept pretty much whatever you raise the rents to ... within reason!" Ultimately, residents were forced to sign new leases at the higher rents or leave the community, but the eviction notices they received were rescinded. They also got the owner to agree to sell the property to the residents, and ARNL is continuing to fight to convert the park into a cooperative.

After several such campaigns involving tenant organizing, Casar directed city resources to create the Resident's Advocacy Project, which later became Building and Strengthening Tenant Action (BASTA), to provide for more consistent capacity directed toward organizing working-class tenants in Austin.

=== Immigrant rights advocacy ===
Before serving as council member, Casar was actively involved in several immigrant rights campaigns. After Trump's election in 2016, Casar and Austin mayor Steve Adler vowed to join other cities in resisting Trump's plans to target illegal immigrants.

==== Raids ====
Shortly after Travis County sheriff Sally Hernandez was elected in 2016, she implemented policies to make Austin a sanctuary city. In response, Immigration and Customs Enforcement (ICE) conducted targeted raids in an operation called Operation Cross Check, arresting hundreds of people. ICE initially claimed that these raids had been long-planned, but an ICE agent admitted in Federal Court that they targeted Austin specifically in retribution for refusing to fully cooperate with ICE. After the raids, Casar and other members of the Austin City Council took emergency action and amended the city budget to provide legal services for undocumented immigrants, including deportation defense.

==== SB4 ====
In 2017, Casar joined other local and statewide leaders to protest Texas Senate Bill 4, which forces local officials to cooperate with federal immigration officials and punishes local officials, including with prison time, who decline to do so. On May Day of that year, Casar and other activists occupied Governor Greg Abbott's office for a full day, calling on Abbott to veto the bill. This led to the arrest of Casar and nearly two dozen other activists.

Casar proposed in a New York Times opinion piece that SB4 must be protested at every possible stage, lest laws like it be passed in other states. He joined a coalition of grassroots organizations and elected officials from municipalities across the state to initiate a lawsuit against the State of Texas to overturn the law, the first statewide effort of its kind. The suit is still pending.

=== Labor ===
==== Living wage ====
In 2015, Casar aided fellow council member Ann Kitchen, who proposed raising the minimum wage paid to all City of Austin employees to $13.03 and offering health benefits for all employees, including part-time and temporary workers. After continued advocacy by Casar and the City Council, all City of Austin employees now make a minimum of $15 an hour. In 2016, Casar sponsored a resolution to extend the living wage requirement to all city contractors and subcontractors, such as airport food workers and construction workers.

==== Paid sick leave ====
On May Day 2018, labor unions, the Workers Defense Project, progressive businesses, the Democratic Socialists of America, and other activists joined in calling for a paid sick leave requirement for all Austin workers. The Austin Chamber of Commerce, the Texas Restaurant Association (state chapter of the National Restaurant Association), and the Texas chapter of the National Federation of Independent Business opposed the requirement, but the campaign ultimately saw a successful vote of the city council for a modified version of Casar's proposal. The sick leave ordinance covered the entire private sector, and provided between six and eight sick days for all Austin workers. Casar credited grassroots organizations with getting people to contact their council members to push them to vote for the ordinance through the organization's grassroots canvassing operation. Responding to the success in Austin, and due to the advocacy of the organizations who fought for the policy, both San Antonio and Dallas passed Austin's version of the ordinance.

After the ordinance passed, the Texas business community and statewide Republican politicians moved to block its implementation. In October 2018, a three-judge panel of the 3rd Court of Appeals found the ordinance unconstitutional on the grounds that benefits are wages. Two of the three Republican judges on the panel were defeated by Democratic challengers in the November election several weeks later. During the 2019 legislative session, Republican state lawmakers filed bills to overturn the ordinance, causing protests from a coalition of unions and grassroots organizations. As of May 2019, the bills have not passed. A representative of the NFIB says the bills failed to pass due to a growing progressive movement in Texas, saying: "I think they're winning in a red state. … They're starting to take over the state, and they will."

== Electoral history ==
=== Austin City Council ===
2020 Austin District 4 general election
Candidate	Votes	%
Greg Casar (incumbent)	11,629	66.8
Louis Herrin III	4,310	24.8
Ramesses II Setepenre	1,466	8.4
Total votes	17,405	100

2016 Austin District 4 general election
Candidate	Votes	%
Greg Casar (incumbent)	7,328	60.89
Gonzalo Camacho	2,760	22.93
Louis Herrin III	1,947	16.18
Total votes	12,035	100

2014 Austin District 4 runoff election
Candidate	Votes	%
Greg Casar	2,854	64.61
Laura Pressley	1,563	35.39
Total votes	7,630	100

2014 Austin District 4 general election
Candidate	Votes	%
Greg Casar	3,272	38.6
Laura Pressley	1,826	21.6
Katrina M. Daniel	1,369	16.2
Sharon Mays	720	8.5
Monica Guzman	556	6.6
Roberto Perez Jr	426	5
Louis Herrin III	224	2.6
Marco Mancillas	806	3.8
Total votes	21,083	100

=== United States House of Representatives ===
2022 Texas's 35th congressional district Democratic primary results
Party	Candidate	Votes	%
Democratic	Greg Casar	25,505	61.1
Democratic	Eddie Rodriguez	6,526	15.6
Democratic	Rebecca Viagran	6,511	15.6
Democratic	Carla-Joy Sisco	3,190	7.6
Total votes		41,732	100.0

Texas's 35th congressional district, 2022
Party	Candidate	Votes	%
Democratic	Greg Casar	129,599	72.58
Republican	Dan McQueen	48,969	27.42
Total votes		178,568	100.0

Texas's 35th congressional district, 2024
Party	Candidate	Votes	%
Democratic	Greg Casar (incumbent)	170,509	67.36
Republican	Steven Wright	82,610	32.64%
Total votes		253,119	100.0

== Personal life ==
Casar is married to Asha Dane'el, a philanthropic adviser. They have a son, born in October of 2025.

== See also ==
- List of Hispanic and Latino Americans in the United States Congress

== Notes ==
U.S. House of Representatives
Preceded by Lloyd Doggett	Member of the U.S. House of Representatives from Texas's 35th congressional district 2023–present	Incumbent
Party political offices
Preceded by Pramila Jayapal	Chair of the Congressional Progressive Caucus; 2025–present	Incumbent
U.S. order of precedence (ceremonial)
Preceded by Eric Burlison	United States representatives by seniority 297th	Succeeded by Juan Ciscomani
