= Austin City Hall (Austin, Texas) =

City government offices of Austin, Texas

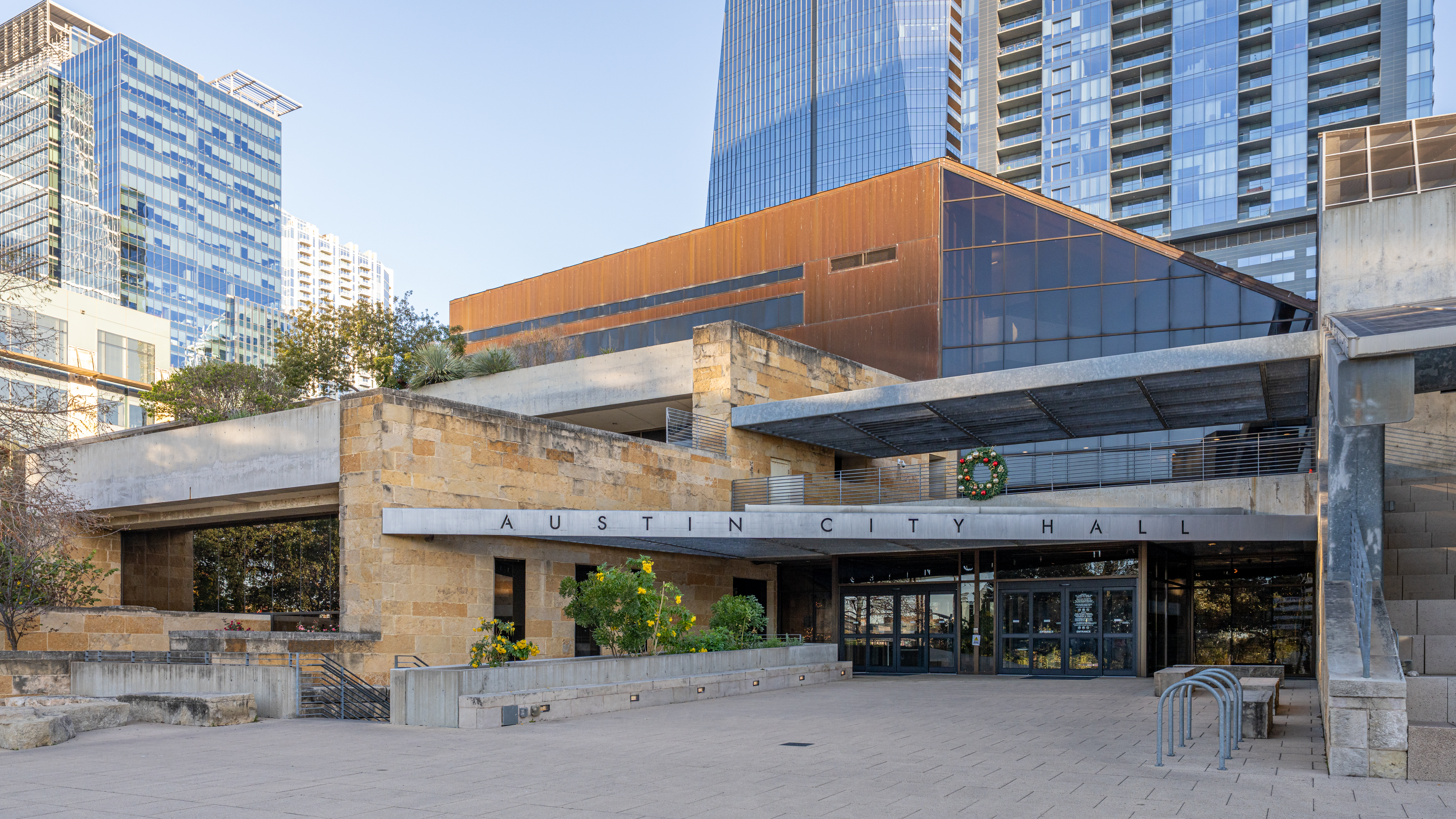
- Austin City Hall

General information
- Type: Municipal government
- Location: 301 W 2nd St., Austin, Texas, U.S. 78701
- Coordinates: 30.2649°N 97.7472°W
- Completed: 2004; 22 years ago

Design and construction
- Architects: Antoine Predock; Cotera + Reed Architects

Austin City Hall is the seat of Austin municipal government, located at 301 W 2nd St in Downtown Austin, Texas, United States. The current building was completed in 2004. It is the meeting place for the Austin City Council. The current building was designed by Antoine Predock and Cotera + Reed Architects, and was intended to reflect what The Dallas Morning News referred to as the city's "crazy-quilt vitality, that embraces everything from country music to environmental protests and high-tech swagger." The building was constructed from recycled materials.

== History ==
Austin formerly operated its City Hall at 124 West 8th Street. In the 1980s, the City of Austin proposed a 60-acre urban renewal project for Austin's Warehouse District, which would have included a new city hall complex designed by urban planner Denise Scott Brown, along with a new location for the Laguna Gloria art museum, designed by architect Robert Venturi. In 1987, partially in response to the Savings and Loan Crisis, the plans were shelved when the property was foreclosed upon.

In 1999, Mayor Kirk Watson and the Austin City Council approved a $10.4 million tax incentive for the Computer Sciences Corporation (CSC) to construct a three-building complex on the same site slated for the failed city hall complex, under the stipulation that CSC funded the construction of a new city hall. The first two buildings (now home to Silicon Labs) were constructed before CSC vacated the premises before following through with the construction of the city hall building.

In November 2004, the Austin City Hall officially opened in its current building at 301 W 2nd St.

== See also ==
- Austin City Council
- Mayor of Austin
