= Emma Long Metropolitan Park =

Municipal park in northwest Austin, Texas

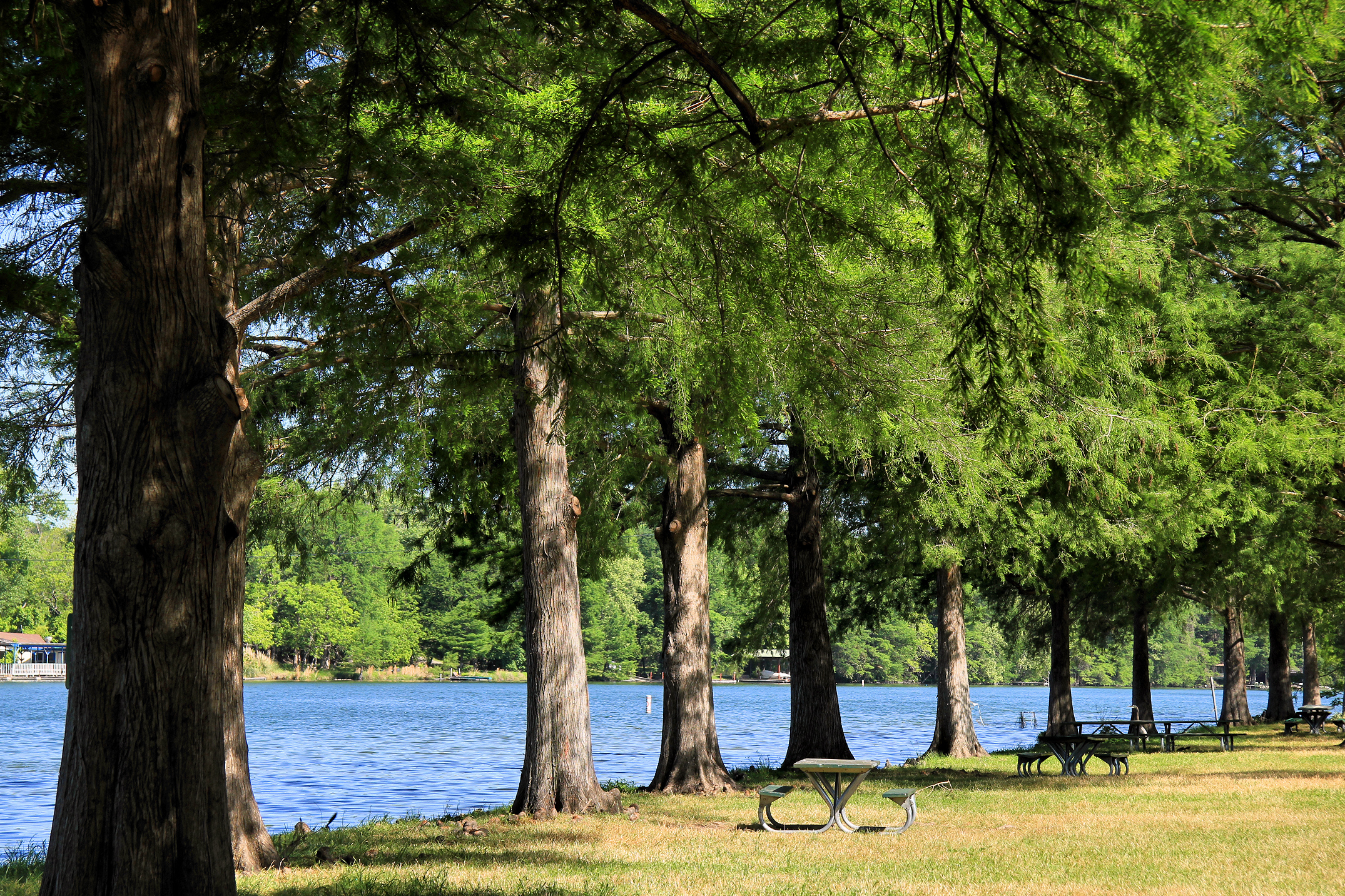
- The trees along the shoreline of Emma Long Metropolitan Park were planted by the Civilian Conservations Corps.
- Nearest city: Austin, Texas, USA
- Coordinates: 30.335°N 97.83°W
- Area: 1,142 acres (462 ha)
- Established: 1939
- Governing body: Austin Parks and Recreation Department

Emma Long Metropolitan Park is a 1,142 acres (462 ha) urban park in northwest Austin, Texas, United States. The park is on the shores of Lake Austin and was originally called City Park. The park opened in 1939 and is managed by the Austin Parks and Recreation Department.

== History ==
In 1939, Civilian Conservation Corps Company 1805 that had just finished Bastrop State Park moved to the site to begin developing the tract of land into a municipal park. The company's primary work included seeding and sodding grass, planting trees, and protecting the bank of the lake from erosion. They built docks, piers and a boathouse. They also built a wooden bath house and concession stand. These wooden structures burned and were replaced with stone structures that are still in use.

In 1984, the Austin City Council renamed the park after Emma Long, a former Austin City Council Member. Long was the first woman to serve on the council of a large city in Texas. She also served as the first woman Mayor Pro Tem from 1967-1969.

== Activities ==
Park activities include camping, hiking, boating, picnicking, swimming and volleyball. The park features 250 linear feet of sand beach, which needs to be periodically restored.

== Nature ==
=== Animals ===
White-tailed deer are one of the most common mammals observed in the park. Observer have also spotted Eastern fox squirrel and striped skunk. Golden-cheeked warbler and black-capped vireo habitat has been identified within the park.

=== Plants ===
Tree species located on-site include eastern cottonwood, weeping willow, black willow, cedar elm, pecan, American sycamore, Ashe juniper, baldcypress, Texas live oak, bur oak, post oak, chinquapin oak, white oak and red oak.
