= Ellen Troxclair =

American politician

Member of the Texas House of Representatives from the 19th district
- Incumbent
- Assumed office January 10, 2023
- Preceded by: James White

Member of the Austin City Council from the 8th district
- In office January 6, 2015 – January 5, 2019
- Preceded by: Constituency established
- Succeeded by: Paige Ellis

Personal details
- Party: Republican
- Spouse: Caleb

Ellen Troxclair is an American small business owner and politician who is a member of the Texas House of Representatives for District 19. A member of the Republican Party, Troxclair was the youngest woman ever elected to the Austin City Council, where she served the 8th district from 2015 to 2019.

== Political career ==
Troxclair initially ran for the Texas Senate to replace Dawn Buckingham. However, she was drawn out of the district and Pete Flores was endorsed by Buckingham, which led her to run for Texas's 19th House of Representatives district instead. She defeated Justin Berry by 13% in the primary. Troxclair went on to face Democrat Pam Baggett and independent Kodi Sawin in the general election and won decisively with 72.6% of all votes cast.

Troxclair supports a ban on Democrats being given committee chairmanships as long as the Republicans hold the majority of seats in the Texas House.

Texas House of Representatives
Preceded by James White	Member of the Texas House of Representatives from the 19th district 2023–present	Incumbent
