= Ron Reynolds (politician) =

American politician (born 1973)

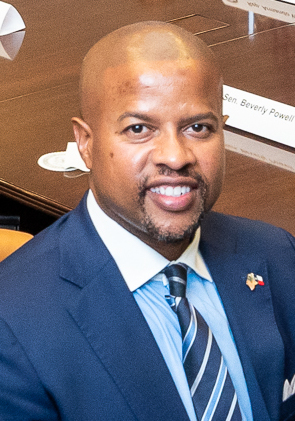
- Reynolds in 2021

Member of the Texas House of Representatives from the 27th district
- Incumbent
- Assumed office January 11, 2011
- Preceded by: Dora Olivo

Personal details
- Born: Ronald Eugene Reynolds; September 18, 1973 (age 53) Jackson, Tennessee, U.S.
- Party: Democratic
- Spouse: Jonita Wallace (divorced)
- Children: 3
- Education: Texas Southern University (BS); Texas Tech University School of Law (JD)
- Occupation: Politician; judge; professor
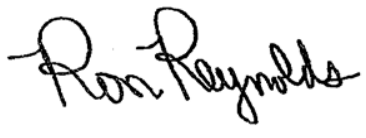
- Signature
- Website: Office website
- Criminal information
- Status: Incarcerated at the Montgomery County Jail; Released January 2019
- Conviction: Solicitation of professional employment (5 counts)
- Penalty: Sentenced to 365 days (Served 120 days)

Ronald Eugene Reynolds (born September 18, 1973) is an American politician and disbarred lawyer who represents District 27 in the Texas House of Representatives. He was first elected in 2010. Reynolds is the first African American elected to represent Fort Bend County in the Texas House of Representatives since the Reconstruction era.

Reynolds was elected Chair of the Texas Legislative Black Caucus in August 2022. He led the charge to form the first-ever Texas Historically Black Colleges and Universities (HBCU) Legislative Caucus in 2023 and now serves as its Chair.

Previously, he served as the Chair of Texas Legislative Progressive Caucus and was a managing partner and attorney in private practice with the Brown, Brown & Reynolds law firm. He specialized in personal injury law, Social Security disability and family law. He was an adjunct professor at Texas Southern University, a Houston Associate Municipal Judge, and was the president of the Houston Lawyers Association and president of the Missouri City & Vicinity National Association for the Advancement of Colored People (NAACP). Currently, he is a National Board Member of the NAACP since his appointment to the board in February 2024. He is also a principal at Civitas Engineering and Group Vice President of Business Development.

In November 2018, Reynolds was re-elected to his fifth term as a member of the Texas House of Representatives while he was in jail. One day after U.S. President Joe Biden's performance in the June 27, 2024, presidential debate, which he called a "train wreck", Reynolds became one of the first Democratic politicians to call for Biden to be replaced at the 2024 Democratic National Convention.

== Early life and education ==
Reynolds moved from Tennessee to Missouri City, Texas, as a child with his single mother. He attended the local schools of Fort Bend County. Reynolds graduated from Texas Southern University in 1996 with a Bachelor of Science degree in public affairs. He then attended Texas Tech University School of Law, graduating in 1999, with a Juris Doctor degree.

== Political career ==
Reynolds first vied in the 2008 Texas House of Representatives Democratic party primary election for District 27, against the incumbent, Dora Olivo.

Reynolds garnered 14,634 votes (49.7%) to Olivo's 14,821 (50.3%). In 2010, he vied in the Democratic primaries again and unseated Olivo after polling 5,158 (57.6%) to 3,791 (42.4%). In the same year's general election, he beat Derek Dean Grayson of the Libertarian party. He was sworn in on 10 January 2011 as State Representative, House District 27.

In 2012, he ran unopposed in the Democratic party primaries and won re-election with 69% of the votes in the general election. Reynolds was elected for a third term during the 2014 general election after polling 24,326 (67%) against David Wayne Hamilton's 11,990. Reynolds was opposed by Angelique Bartholomew in the runoff for the Democratic party primaries for the 27th district in 2016. Reynolds led in the March 1, 2016, primary but came up about 250 votes short to avoid a runoff election. He finished first in the four candidate primary with about 48.5% of the vote. Angelique Bartholomew received 24.1%. The runoff election occurred on May 24, 2016. Reynolds was supported by Al Green, Sheila Jackson Lee, Sylvester Turner, and the Democratic party chair of Fort Bend County in what was his first primary challenge since he had been elected and won the runoff election by a vote of 53% to 47%. He survived the low-turnout runoff election by 225 votes. He faced the Republican party politician Ken Bryant in the 2016 general election. During the Democratic primaries in 2018, he beat his opponent Wilvin Carter with 61.37%. He won the 2018 general election unopposed while in jail as the Republican party did not field a candidate.

During the 2020 general election, he defeated Tom Virippan to win re-election. Reynolds was arrested with U.S. congressman Al Green during a voting rights protest in front of the U.S. Supreme Court in Washington D.C. in 2021. He was one of many Democrats who had arrest warrants issued to them after they refused to join a special session ordered by Greg Abbott in August 2021. He founded the Texas House Progressive Caucus in 2021 and in 2022, he polled 70.3% of the votes to beat the Republican party candidate, Sohrab Gilani. Reynolds was elected Chair of the Texas Legislative Black Caucus in August 2022. He led the charge to form the first-ever Texas Historically Black Colleges and Universities (HBCU) Legislative Caucus in 2023.

Reports have named Reynolds as owing the most in fines to the Texas Ethics Commission compared to any other lawmaker in 2017, 2018, and 2024. As of July 2024, Reynolds owed over $77,000 in fines to the Texas Ethics Commission.

== Political views ==
=== Abortion ===
Reynolds is in favor of abortion rights.

=== Cannabis ===
A joint resolution introduced by Reynolds called for an amendment to the state Constitution that would direct Texas legislators to "authorize and regulate the possession, cultivation, and sale of cannabis for medical use in this state."

=== Justice system ===
Reynolds has supported criminal justice reform bills such as grants to police departments for police body cameras, grand jury reform, and James White's bill to decriminalize truancy. He supported a bill that would require a special prosecutor in cases of officer-involved shootings. Reynolds believes that his legal problems were politically and racially motivated, and that he is the victim of selective prosecution. When his conviction was overturned in 2014, Reynolds offered a critique of the justice system of Montgomery County, saying "I have a very strong conviction I didn't get a fair trial, but even bigger I believe it's difficult for [an] African-American to get [a] fair trial in Montgomery County, Texas". In 2015, Reynolds likened a criminal case against him as a "modern day lynching".

=== Medicare ===
Reynolds has indicated his support for the expansion of Medicare to address the amount of uninsured residents in Texas, which has the highest percentage of uninsured people in the United States.

=== Minimum wage ===
In 2019, Reynolds proposed a bill to raise the minimum wage of Texas to $15 an hour. He said, "We need to close the economic gap here in Texas, working full time and trying to support a family on less than $15,000 a year is impossible."

=== Reparations ===
Reynolds proposed legislation that would have Texas pay reparations amounting to $95 million to descendants of the Sugar Land 95, which were 95 19th-century African Americans that were forced to work in a plantation in Sugar Land, Texas, under the convict lease system. He suggested that identification could be done by testing DNA.

=== Gaza-Israel conflict ===
In November 2023, Reynolds was a signer of a letter urging the Biden administration to secure additional humanitarian aid and push for a ceasefire in Israel's war on Gaza. He signed a later letter urging the administration "to reassess the unconditional aid provided to Israel" in the hope that they would "not hesitate to halt the provision of offensive weapons in order to prevent any future human rights violations."

== Awards and honors ==
Reynolds has been awarded with the EEOC Civil Rights All Star Award, the American Red Cross Humanitarian Award, the Houston Black Chamber of Commerce Pinnacle Award (twice), the Missouri City Juneteenth Community Service Award, and the DMARS Business Journal Top Lawyer & Public Servant Award. He was named in Houston's Top 40 Leaders Under 40, named Houston’s Top Lawyer by HTexas Magazine, and recognized in Who's Who in Black Houston. He was voted by the House Democratic Caucus as Freshman Legislator of the Year in 2011 and was named Public Servant of the Year by the Houston Minority Contractors Association.

He has also received the American Red Cross Humanitarian Award, the YMCA Minority Achievers Award, the NAACP Drum Major for Justice Award, and the Texas Association of African American Chamber of Commerce's Legislator of the Year Award.

== Legal issues ==
Reynolds has faced several legal and ethical challenges during his career. In 2005, the State Bar of Texas sanctioned him twice for professional misconduct, resulting in a suspension from practicing law from April 1, 2005, to June 30, 2006, followed by a probated suspension that lasted until June 30, 2009. During his first political campaign in 2008, the Texas Ethics Commission terminated his campaign treasurer. Reynolds continued to raise and spend campaign funds until a new treasurer was appointed six months later.

In 2012, Reynolds turned himself in to authorities on accusations of barratry and was released on bond. The case was dismissed in 2013 due to issues with evidence handling. Later that year, his law office was raided in connection with a $25 million kickback scheme. Reynolds was indicted for participating in a scheme to steer clients in exchange for kickbacks and was initially convicted in 2013, but a mistrial was declared. In 2015, he was convicted on five counts of illegal solicitation of legal clients on November 16, 2015, fined, and sentenced to one year in prison. Reynolds had represented himself in court proceedings, later saying, "Everybody advised me not to do it, but who would best represent me other than me? I know the most about this case". Reynolds was the only one of the eight attorneys charged who did not accept a plea deal and took the case to trial. Reynolds planned to appeal the decision.

In April 2016, Reynolds was ordered to pay a former client $504,000. He was accused of winning a monetary settlement for a client whose daughter died in a car crash and then keeping her share of the money. Also in the same month, a Harris County judge ordered Reynolds to pay more than $95,000 to a couple after he had reached a settlement without informing them or having their consent. The next month it was reported that his law license had been suspended by the Supreme Court of Texas's Board of Disciplinary Appeals. It was also reported that he missed the filing deadline of May 16 to report his campaign fundraising information and that he owed over $30,000 in fines to the Texas Ethics Commission for failing to file campaign and personal financial statements on time. Reynolds filed for chapter 7 bankruptcy in 2016. He listed he owed $3,000 in unpaid Houston-area tolls, $15,000 to the Texas Ethics Commission for failing to file financial disclosure forms, and faced $1.3 million in debt.

His 2015 conviction was upheld in 2017, and he began his prison sentence on September 7, 2018. Reynolds was released on January 4, 2019, just days before the beginning of the 86th legislative session. Reynolds was formally disbarred in July 2019.

Texas House of Representatives
Preceded by Dora Olivo	Member of the Texas House of Representatives from District 27 (Missouri City); 2011–present	Succeeded by Incumbent
