= Matt Mackowiak =

American political consultant

Matt Mackowiak (Mack-o-VEE-yack) is a longtime Austin political consultant and GOP operative. He is the chair of the Travis County Republican Party and co-founder of Save Austin Now, a political action committee involved in ballot initiatives on policing and homeless encampments. Mackowiack was part of a 2024 election lawsuit and ran for a position on the Travis County Appraisal Review Board.

Mackowiak has appeared on Fox News, MSNBC, BBC News, CBC-TV and regularly provides political analysis on Austin's Fox 7 station. His byline on op-eds has appeared in the Austin American-Statesman and on web sites such as The Huffington Post.

== Early life and education ==
At age 4 Mackowiak moved from Ohio for his father's job with Motorola. He went to Canyon Vista Middle School and Westwood High School in northwest Austin. Attending University of Texas he found a community joining the Texas Cowboys student organization.

== Washington era ==
During the 2003 legislative session, an internship for a lobbyist led to an interview for a job in Washington D.C., where Mackowiak moved upon graduating from UT.

In D.C., he was an assistant at the Department of Homeland Security under the George W. Bush administration. In 2007, he got his first significant position as the press secretary for Senator Kay Bailey Hutchison. In April 2009, Mackowiak left his office, and in June, he launched the Potomac Strategy Group, stating that he wanted to build a business and become a political consultant. Although he was not employed by Hutchison, he defended her on Twitter and criticized Rick Perry, her opponent.

His attacks on Perry led to a two-day Twitter war with Michael Quinn Sullivan, the president of the conservative public action committee Empower Texans, when Mackowiak accused him of secretly supporting Perry.

Mackowiak subsequently endured ridicule from a parody Twitter account, #NotMackwiak.

His new business provides corporate communications services, including media relations, writing, opposition research, and digital strategy. It also does political consulting for conservative campaigns.

Mackowiak moved back to Austin in 2013.

== Save Austin Now ==
Mackowiak joined with activist Cleo Petricek to found Save Austin Now (SAN) in response to the revision of Austin's camping ordinance in 2019. The City Council voted to scale back rules on camping, panhandling and sitting or lying down in public As tent camps popped up around Austin, SAN initiated a ballot proposition to re-criminalize lying down on public sidewalks, panhandling and sleeping outdoors in certain parts of the city. SAN describes itself as a nonpartisan citizen's group dedicated to Austin's quality of life.

For seven months SAN mobilized to support the anti-camping ballot initiative, which became Proposition B. By the summer of 2020, SAN gathered 25,000 signatures to get the proposition on the ballot. At first the city disallowed the ballot initiative petition because of questionable signatures, but Mackowiak and SAN renewed their petition efforts.

Their efforts garnered wide support, including from John Mackey; Robert Rowling of Omni Hotels & Resorts; Michael Barron, a law partner of Mayor Steve Adler; Governor Greg Abbott; writer-director Mike Judge; as well as a company led by Eddie Margain, a co-founder of Austin FC.

SAN raised an additional $1.9 million, the second highest amount in an Austin city election and succeeded in putting the proposition on the May 2021 ballot. SAN ultimately spent over a year gathering its signatures and mailed their proposed ordinance to every Austin voter. That exposure and spending was enough to generate the highest turnout in a May election since 1994.

The Save Austin Now's anti-camping proposition received a 58%-42% victory, but it had almost no practical effect because a statewide version of a camping ban took effect and preempted the proposition.

In November 2021 SAN unsuccessfully pushed Proposition A, another ballot initiative. The proposition would have required the Austin Police Department to staff at least 2 officers per every 1,000 residents. According to the employment numbers, it would have forced the city to hire hundreds of new police officers. SAN argued that the city's growing number of homicides, officer staffing challenges and lengthening police response times justified the proposition. Austin voters rejected Proposition A by over 68%. On election night the Austin Police Association released a statement acknowledging Save Austin Now and thanking them.

== Appraisal district race ==
In May 2024 Travis County held an election to choose the board of Travis Central Appraisal District. Although the district was created in 1979, this was the first time the board members would be elected. That change was one aspect of legislation signed into law in July 2023 by Governor Greg Abbott.

Although the new election was technically non-partisan, the change was viewed as a Republican attempt to influence the Democratic county. Democrats voiced concerns that electing anti-tax Republican candidates, like Mackowiack, could impact school funding, parks and libraries, and the ability the city to provide services for residents.

The three board seats were elected at large. Mackowiack filed to run in Place 2 and faced candidates Jonathan Patschke and Daniel Wang. Shenghao “Daniel” Wang won Place 2 by a wide margin, defeating Mackowiak and Patshcke.

== Republican Party office ==
Mackowiak became the chair of the Travis County Republican Party in 2017.

In May 2024 Mackowiak announced he was running for chair of the Republican Party of Texas, joining a crowded field seeking to replace outgoing Chair Matt Rinaldi. He sharply criticised Rinaldi and his endorsed successor, Abraham George, accusing them of incompetence, mismanagement, and laziness. After a floor fight at the Republican state convention, Abraham George won on a second ballot.

February 24, 2025 Mackowiak announced he was stepping down as Travis County Republican chair.

== 2024 election lawsuit ==
Matt Mackowiak announced on October 29, 2024, that the local Travis County Republican Party had sued the Travis County elections administrator, alleging that the administrator had created a “severe deficiency” in the number of Republican poll workers at the county's voting locations. It urged the court to compel the county to "achieve bipartisan representation at all Election Day polling locations”. The Austin-based 3rd Court of Appeals dismissed the suit the next day calling it "moot".

Mackowiak and the county GOP appealed to the Texas Supreme Court, who dismissed the case on the eve of the November 5th election. The court criticized them for taking action so late in the election and for providing what it called "spotty" evidence.

More than 100 such complaints and election-related lawsuits were filed across the country by local and state arms of the Republican Party, and some by the Republican National Committee.

== Cornyn campaign senior adviser ==
In May 2025, Mackowick was serving as Senator John Cornyn's senior campaign advisor.
