= Ann Kitchen =

American politician

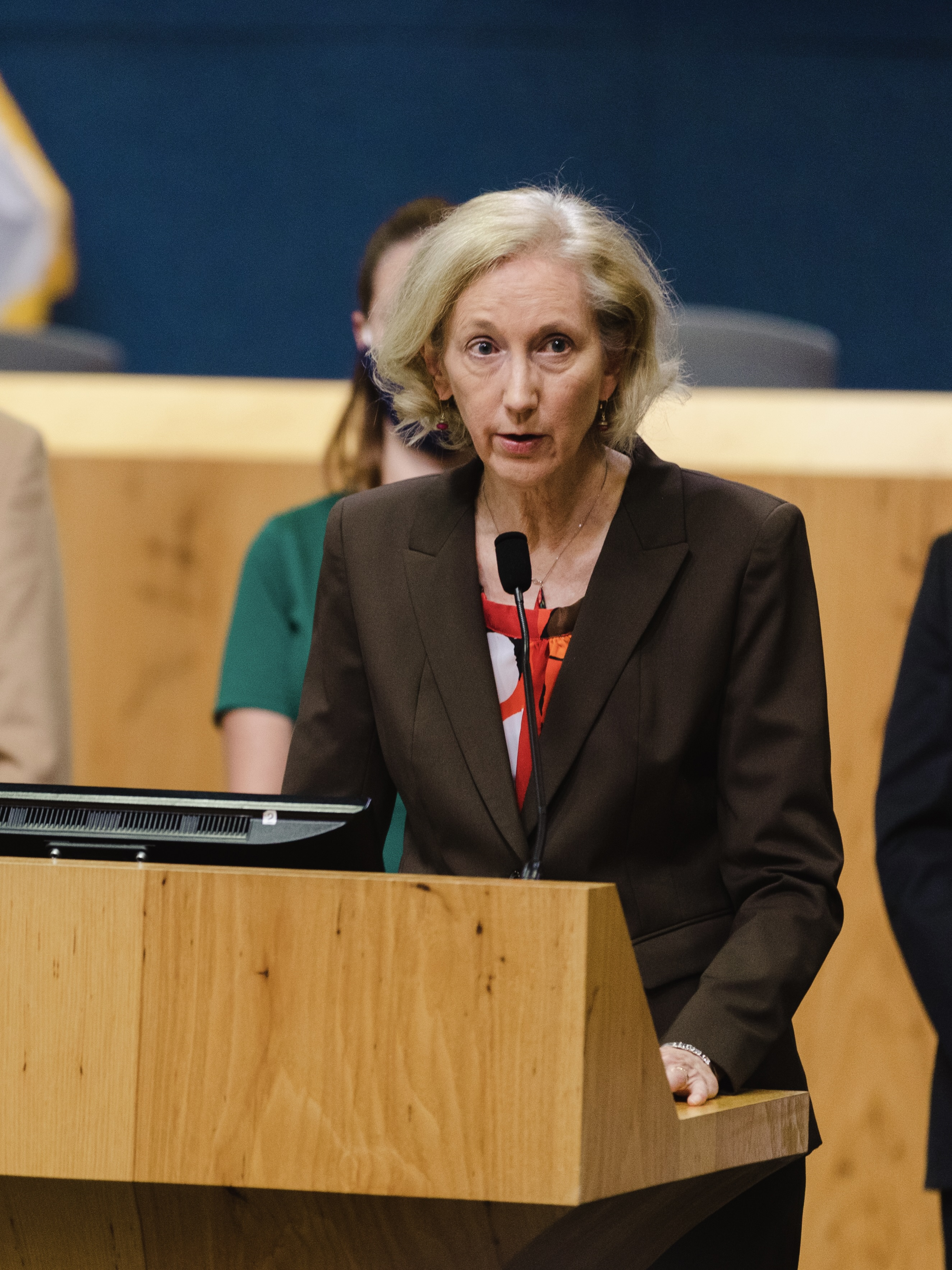

Member of Austin City Council from the 5th district
- In office January 6, 2015 – January 6, 2023
- Preceded by: Office established
- Succeeded by: Ryan Alter

Member of the Texas House of Representatives from the 48th district
- In office January 9, 2001 – January 14, 2003
- Preceded by: Sherri Greenberg
- Succeeded by: Todd Baxter

Personal details
- Born: December 15, 1954 (age 71)
- Party: Democratic
- Spouse: Mark Yznaga
- Education: University of Texas at Austin (BA, JD)

Ann Elizabeth Kitchen (born December 15, 1954) is an American attorney and politician who served as a member of the Austin City Council from the 5th district from 2015 to 2023 and as a member of the Texas House of Representatives from 2001 to 2003. She is affiliated with the Democratic Party.

== Political career ==
Kitchen also served as a policy adviser to the Texas Health and Human Services Commission. She began her career in the Texas Attorney General's consumer protection division.

=== Texas House of Representatives ===
Ann Kitchen was elected to the Texas State House of Representatives, District 48, in the election of 2000. She was defeated for reelection in 2002 by Republican Todd Baxter following the 2000 redistricting in Texas.

In the legislature, she is best remembered for her contributions to House Bill 1156, which expanded women's access to health care, and Senate Bill 11, the Medical Records Privacy Act.

After leaving the legislature, Ann Kitchen was Executive Director of the Indigent Care Collaboration (ICC) a regional collaboration of public and private hospitals, clinics, MHMR, public health departments, university medical departments, and medical society responsible for providing care for uninsured individuals.

=== Austin City Council ===
Ann Kitchen was Vice Chair of the City of Austin Charter Revision Committee and the City Councilmember for District 5. Kitchen was elected to Austin City Council District 5 on November 4, 2014. She garnered 54% of the vote in a field of seven candidates and avoided a runoff election. She was sworn in on January 6, 2015.

In 2015, Kitchen proposed regulations on ridesharing companies such as Uber and Lyft. These regulations were presented as necessary for public safety, such as a requirement for fingerprinting rideshare drivers. Opponents, noting that Kitchen received campaign contributions from taxi companies, claimed that the gross receipts tax, rules on fares, and other regulations included in the proposal threatened to drive those companies out of Austin.

On May 9, Kitchen's proposed regulations went into effect after a ballot proposition to alter them, backed by an $8 million Uber/Lyft-funded PAC, was defeated in a special election. In response, Uber and Lyft ceased services in Austin.

In May 2017, Texas Governor Greg Abbott signed House Bill 100, which overruled local ride-share regulations and removed the fingerprint-screening requirement. The non-profit Texans for Public Justice reports that Uber and Lyft spent up to $2.3 million in support of the statewide legislation.

In 2018, Ann Kitchen was elected to her second term in City Council after running unopposed. She did not seek reelection in 2022 and was succeeded by attorney and former state Capitol staffer Ryan Alter.

==== Recall efforts ====
In January 2016, a recall petition against Kitchen was circulated and submitted to the City Clerk in February 2016 by the Austin4All PAC. Austin4All was criticized by city leaders and many Austinites for its purported lack of transparency and multiple ethics complaints were filed against the PAC, claiming Austin4All violated state election law by knowingly accepting political contributions and making political expenditure over $500 without filing a campaign treasurer appointment. Groups supporting Councilwoman Kitchen were formed as well in order to oppose Austin4All's petition.

In February 2016, Austin4All submitted 5,289 signatures to the city clerk's office. City Clerk Jannette Goodall rejected the recall petition shortly after, citing the group's failure to sign petition sheets in the presence of a notary.

== Personal life ==
Kitchen is married to Mark Yznaga, a lobbyist with the City of Austin. Prior to her election to the State Legislature, Kitchen was an attorney, and later managed the health care regulatory group of Price Waterhouse Coopers.
