= José Garza =

American lawyer

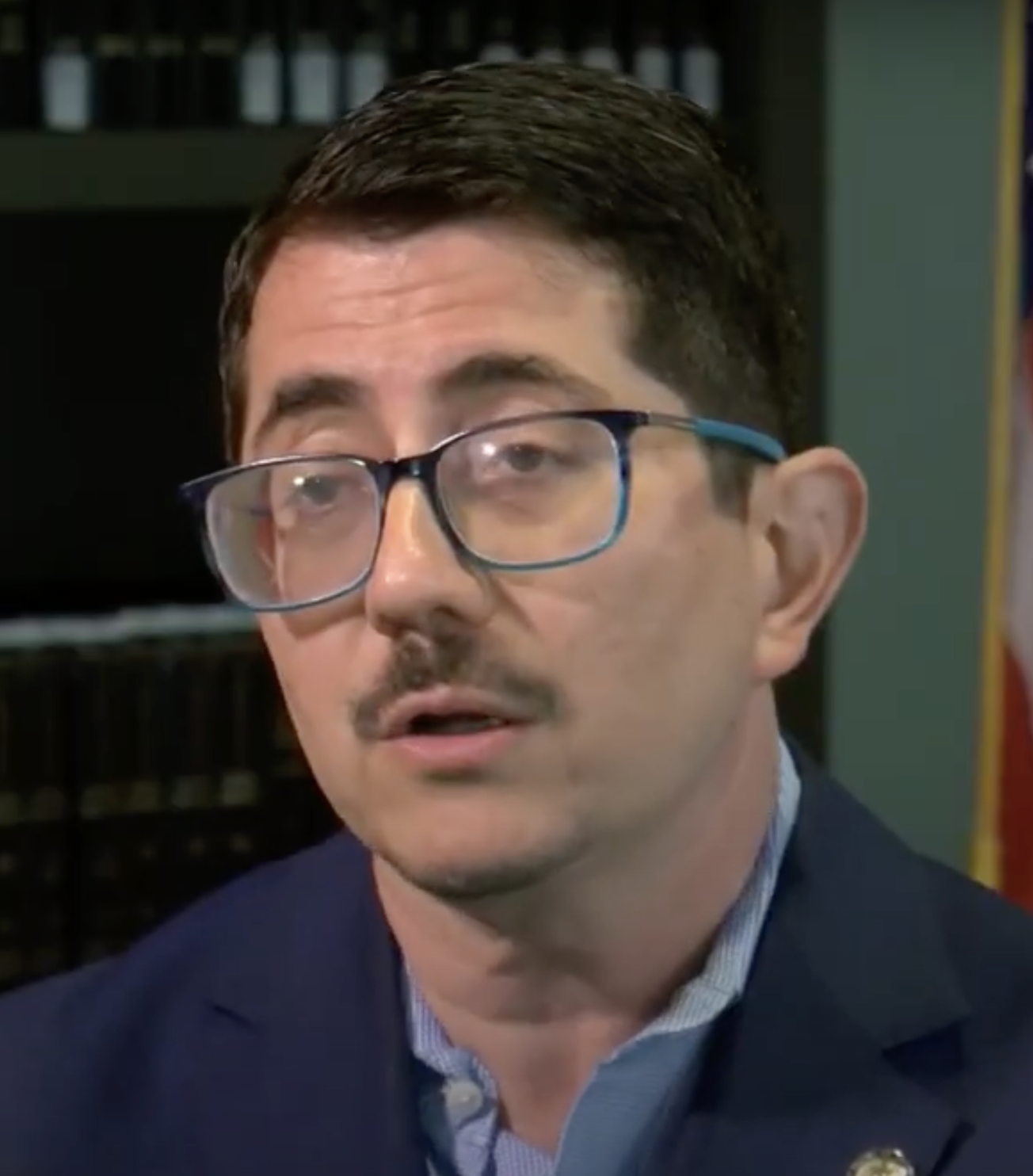
- Garza in 2024

District Attorney of Travis County
- Incumbent
- Assumed office January 1, 2021
- Preceded by: Margaret Moore

Personal details
- Born: José Pompa Garza Laredo, Texas, U.S.
- Party: Democratic
- Other political affiliations: Democratic Socialists of America
- Education: University of Texas, Austin (BA); Catholic University (JD)
- Website: Campaign website

José Pompa Garza is an American lawyer serving as the district attorney of Travis County, Texas, since 2021.

== Early life and education ==
José Garza was born in Laredo, Texas, and grew up in San Antonio. He graduated from University of Texas in 2001. He later graduated with a J.D. from Catholic University in Washington, D.C.

== Career ==
=== Workers Defense Project ===
He was previously the executive director of the Workers Defense Project from 2015 to 2021. While Garza was the executive director the Workers Defense Project, he worked to pass paid sick-time policies in Austin, Dallas, and San Antonio.

=== 2020 election campaign for Travis County District Attorney ===
In 2020, Garza was the Democratic Party nominee to run for Travis County District Attorney after he defeated incumbent DA Margaret Moore in the July 2020 runoff for the Democratic Party nomination. Garza began his campaign by advocating for significant changes to drug prosecutions, "On day one, we will end the prosecution of low-level drug offenses here in Travis County." Garza ran on a platform of ending prosecutions for low-level drug possession to focus on violent crimes, holding police officers accountable for misconduct, and pursuing restorative justice. He has advocated against cash bail and promoted diversion programs to prevent felony convictions. He is a member of the Democratic Socialists of America, and his campaign for Travis County District Attorney was largely funded by George Soros through his Open Society Foundations network of entities.

=== Relationship with law enforcement ===
Garza has had a shaky relationship with law enforcement in Austin, and has claimed to be doing more to hold police accountable. He charged police officer Christopher Taylor with murder over the shooting death of Michael Ramos, a black and Hispanic man. Taylor was tried twice, with both trials resulting in a mistrial and the most recent one due to a hung jury. He was ultimately convicted of deadly conduct and sentenced to two years in prison, but his conviction was reversed by an appeals court. Garza charged 21 officers with aggravated assault over actions during a May 2020 social justice protest, but he dropped all charges for 17 of those officers in December 2023. Instead, he requested the Civil Rights division of the U.S. Department of Justice to investigation the police response to the protest. In November 2023, Garza was asked to leave the funeral of fallen Austin Police Officer and SWAT Team Member Jorge Pastore. This was due to Garza’s history of prosecuting police officers.

Garza has been accused of withholding evidence from defense attorneys in the prosecution of the officers in the 2020 BLM protest case. Disclosing exculpatory evidence is required under Brady v. Maryland (1963) and Texas' Michael Morton Act. Garza is accused of failing to disclose a 2023 meeting amongst city officials about the possibility of levying charges againt the City of Austin, and attorneys for officer Chance Bretches asked the court to dismiss his charges for violating due process. Garza was sanctioned by a court for withholding evidence in the prosecution of two Williamson County deputies for manslaughter, and investigators accused him of withholding evidence in the Daniel Perry murder trial.

=== Office Turnover ===
Of the 100 attorneys working for Garza's office, 19 of them had resigned by December 2021 due to the pace and level of change in his office. He has also fired several prosecutors over alleged misconduct. Police unions and local activist have accused Garza's policies for the uptick in the homicide rate in Austin, which is higher than it has been in decades; though, supporters of Garza maintain this trend is not unique to Austin and has other causes, including an increase of fire arms and strained community-police relations.

=== 2024 re-election campaign for Travis County District Attorney ===
In 2024, Garza was challenged in the Democratic primary by Jeremy Sylestine whom was initially believed to be a long shot candidate but gained momentum after several six-figure donations and far out-raising Garza in the primary election. Elon Musk emailed Tesla employees urging them to vote for a district attorney who will "actually prosecute crimes." Sylestine's campaign claimed the policies pursued by Garza had undermined public safety and received a mix of support among both Republicans and Democrats, with many of the former pulling Democratic ballots in the primary to support Sylestine. Ultimately, Garza won the primary in March 2024 with an over 30-point margin. Garza defeated Republican nominee Daniel Betts in heavily Democratic Travis County in the November 2024 general election.

=== Removal petition ===
In 2023, Republican Texas Governor Greg Abbott signed into law House Bill 17, which allows for courts to remove district attorneys for "official misconduct", which would include refusal to prosecute certain criminal offenses, with the goal of holding "rogue district attorneys accountable". The law came after some progressive Texas district attorneys, including Garza, would not prosecute abortion laws under Texas statutes. The law limits prosecutorial discretion. On April 8, 2024, a Travis County resident petitioned for Garza to be removed under the law "due to incompetency and official misconduct". The prosecutor for the state moved to dismiss the claim, and it was formally dismissed on December 12, 2024, by 433rd District Court Judge Dib Waldrip in Comal County.
