= Pennsylvania Town =

Settlement pattern found in the US

Map of central Ligonier, Pennsylvania, showing its diamond and street grid, rotated to align with the nearby river.

The Pennsylvania Town is a characteristic settlement pattern in the Pennsylvania Cultural Area of the United States. A Pennsylvania Town is marked by a central square, often called a "diamond", and sometimes a set of outlying squares. The town’s streets are laid out in a grid plan, and the naming of the streets tends to follow a pattern. Typically, one set of streets is named for trees, and the cross streets may be numbered.

Within the town, houses and other buildings are typically built of brick. Houses are set close to one another, generally in rows. The houses are usually built close to the street, with no front yard; sidewalks are often brick as well. Alleys often run behind or next to houses, and many towns exhibit an abundance of shade trees, particularly in the diamond.

The Pennsylvania Town plan has its roots in the original plan for Philadelphia, designed by Thomas Holme and promulgated by William Penn in the 1680s. Settlers carried the plan westward. Although associated with Pennsylvania, this town plan influenced urban design in places far from the state.

== Town types ==
Pennsylvania, has a number of different town street patterns. These include linear, rectilinear/rectangular, and non-geometric layouts. The town layouts may be determined and influenced by such factors as the original land survey, landforms, waterways, and long-distance travel routes. The principal economic activities of a community have also influenced settlement patterns. The national origins of the founders of the town do not show a correlation with the street patterns.

== Plan features ==
As noted in the seminal work of Wilbur Zelinsky, a Pennsylvania Town is marked by rectilinear streets (bounding square or rectangular blocks), a central diamond, closely-spaced buildings, and streets named for trees. Other features include rowhouses built next to one another with no setbacks from the street, and usually only small stoops connecting the private space to the public. Zelinsky also noted that houses in the historic core of a town largely do not have porches, but later row houses, built farther from the city center, often do have porches. The result has been described as "exceptionally compact", with little space between buildings, or between buildings and sidewalks. The houses have red brick facades; these are sometimes painted. Buildings in the core of the town are often built in the Georgian or Federal style; few actual colonial buildings remain, but the style persists, marked by a flat roofline, slender chimneys, a square footprint, and shutters.

When the towns were built, nearby clay deposits were used by brick manufacturers, who sold their products regionally, resulting in towns dominated by brick as a building material. Differences in the quality of the brick had a significant effect on the appearance of towns As lower-quality brick began to deteriorate, it was often painted; the phenomenon of painted brick façades is also an aspect of Pennsylvania German influence. Outside the buildings, the presence of brick sidewalks is another characteristic (Zelinsky thought this was an especially important factor), dating back to before streets were paved. Bricking extended to the streets in the early 20th Century, but brick streets have been almost entirely replaced with tarmac.

The towns also have an abundance of multi-purpose alleys containing residences and occasionally businesses (Zelinsky thought this factor was also particularly important). The combination of houses built all the way to the street, plus deep lots (to provide agricultural space), left back yards large enough to allow subdivision of house lots in some places as towns grew. As a result, alley houses are common in Pennsylvania Towns. The towns also have an abundance of shade trees (Zelinsky’s third especially important factor), particularly maples and sycamores some cities have shade tree commissions charged with the regulation of trees.

Another characteristic is a mixture of land uses from a history of small-scale industrialization. When the towns were built, people would need to live near their workplaces. In factory towns, this meant living near the factory, so factories were often located in close proximity to residential areas. Furthermore, difficulties with transportation meant that retail establishments would need to be located walking distance from residential areas as well; the “corner store” and, to a lesser extent, the “corner bar” were staples of land use patterns. This mixed land use faded with the widespread implementation of conventional “modernist” zoning and its preference for land use separation, but the recent rise of mixed-use zoning has begun to reverse that trend.

These characteristics are not unique to Pennsylvania towns. It is their combination that makes the townscape so named.

== Streets ==
The streets of a Pennsylvania Town are laid out in a rectilinear pattern, although there are often exceptions for particular streets (especially those leading to other towns (Note: See, e.g., Gettysburg.)), and the pattern may be lost in outlying areas of the town. The streets are typically aligned with the points of the compass, although the grid may be rotated or otherwise adjusted, often because of local geography (such as being aligned with a river). In some parts of a larger town, entire sections of the street grid may be rotated to a different alignment than that of the central town, such as to match the road to another town. (Note: See, e.g., Lancaster.)

The names of the streets also follow certain patterns. Typically, one set of streets is numbered, while the perpendicular streets are not. Frequently, the cross streets are named for trees, following the Philadelphia pattern. In Philadelphia, the streets south of Market St. (originally High St.) were named for local timber trees, in order of the hardness of their wood: Chestnut, Walnut, Locust, Spruce, Pine, and Cedar (now South). The streets to the north were largely named for food-producers: Filbert, Cherry, Mulberry (now Arch), Sassafras (now Race), and Vine.

The trees whose names are used for the streets in a Pennsylvania Town may be indigenous to the region (as they are in Philadelphia), but the streets are not always named for local trees; in addition, the streets named for trees are not always parallel to one another: Lancaster’s Lime Street intersects both Lemon and Orange Streets. As towns grew, the original vision for the streets and their names was often lost: one can see the patterns fade away in outlying districts of larger towns.

== Diamond ==
At the historic center of the town, the streets part or widen to form a central square, often called a "diamond". This, too, is in keeping with the Philadelphia plan, which had not only a central square, but also four smaller satellite squares in a quincunx pattern. In smaller towns, usually only the central square is found. In a county seat, the courthouse is typically located at (or sometimes in) the diamond, but towns that have never been county seats may also have diamonds, which are typically put to public use, such as parks. Many squares were originally used to hold public markets. Towns with “diamonds” include Ligonier, York, Lancaster, Reading, Gettysburg, and Carlisle.

There are a number of different types of diamonds. The Lancaster style diamond is marked by a central square at the intersection of two major streets. The corner lots of each of the four surrounding blocks are recessed, creating an open space in the center, around which traffic circulates. A formal space occupies the center of the street loop; this may be the site of the courthouse, a statue, or green space. While the titular Lancaster diamond has been altered significantly, the pattern may be seen in such towns as Gettysburg, Goldsboro, and Ligonier.

The York diamond has no open space between the intersecting streets, but the recessed corners of the adjacent blocks are open and may be treated as four separate squares. Commercial buildings may front the smaller squares. In addition to York, York diamonds may be found in Schaefferstown, Middletown, and Carlisle.

Lebanon diamonds are found in two sub-varieties (it is unusual to find two diamond layouts in one municipality). A Federal Street style diamond is an elongated Lancaster diamond in that it has a formal center and a cross street. It is formed by extending the setback from the cross street beyond the corner lots. Towns using this pattern had the courthouse in the center, flanked by two greens used for markets, although those land uses may have changed. Federal Street diamonds may be found in Millersburg, Marietta, and Manheim. Reading had a Federal Street style diamond, but it has been removed.

A Ninth Street diamond (another Lebanon form) has an elongated setback on one of the intersecting streets, but no formal center. It can be seen as a stretched York diamond. Ninth Street diamonds can be found in Fredericksburg and Jonestown, not far from Lebanon.

== Streetscape ==
Brick sidewalks and shade trees are a feature of the Pennsylvania Town type.

Three "especially important" aspects of the streetscape of a Pennsylvania Town are abundant shade trees, brick sidewalks, and alleys.

William Penn wanted Philadelphia to be a "greene country towne", and encouraged the planting of shade trees. Following this pattern, the Pennsylvania Town has an abundance of shade trees along its streets. Many of the current trees were planted during the City Beautiful Movement, and have begun to show their age. Some have been removed, while others may have grown large enough to become problematic. Some cities have shade tree commissions and rules for the maintenance, removal, and replacement of street trees. Some municipalities require the planting of trees when sidewalk work is performed, and a few require trees to be planted in parking lots, although there is opposition in some quarters. Nevertheless, trees remain a part of the Pennsylvania Town.

Sidewalks built of brick are an early design element dating at least from the 1860s—predating even paved streets. The visual effect of brick paving extended to the streets in the later 19th/early 20th century, but streets that were once paved in brick have almost wholly been given over to tarmac. Brick sidewalks are still found, although they are being lost to concrete. The unique status of sidewalks as public rights of way which are largely maintained by private actors makes the enactment and enforcement of preservation rules difficult. The difficulty and cost of maintaining, repairing, and restoring a brick sidewalk has led to the replacement of many with cheaper, simpler concrete, often after underground utility work or when tree roots “heave” the bricks. However, brick (or “brick banded”—concrete with a strip of brick) sidewalks have enjoyed a renaissance in some revitalized central business districts.

From the beginning of the development of the Pennsylvania Town, alleys have been used to provide access to the rear of houses. The original city blocks were large, resulting in house lots that were particularly deep, to provide for some urban agricultural space. As towns grew and improved transportation meant that food could be brought to town from nearby farms, these back lots were no longer needed for growing food. They were large enough to be divided and alley buildings could be added. Alley houses became a feature of many Pennsylvania Towns.

== Land uses ==
Many Pennsylvania towns developed as mixed manufacturing centers with modest-sized industries sprinkled about the urban landscape. Factories were often sited along transportation corridors such as canals and railroads with the factories interspersed with residential areas (which allowed workers to walk to work from their houses). The result was “nearly total anarchy” in the spatial distribution of land uses. The “corner store” is a common feature in an otherwise residential neighborhood.

As industrial consolidation resulted in the closure of many small factories, the buildings they occupied have often lain empty, but are increasingly repurposed. The reorientation of cities toward automobile use, combined with a preference for use-based zoning districts, tended to make land use more homogenous in the 20th century. The current century’s trend toward mixed-use zoning, allowing non-residential uses in residential areas, has caused some restoration of the old land use patterns. Many factories have become mixed-use complexes, some have been converted to residential use, and some have returned to light industrial uses.

== Roots ==
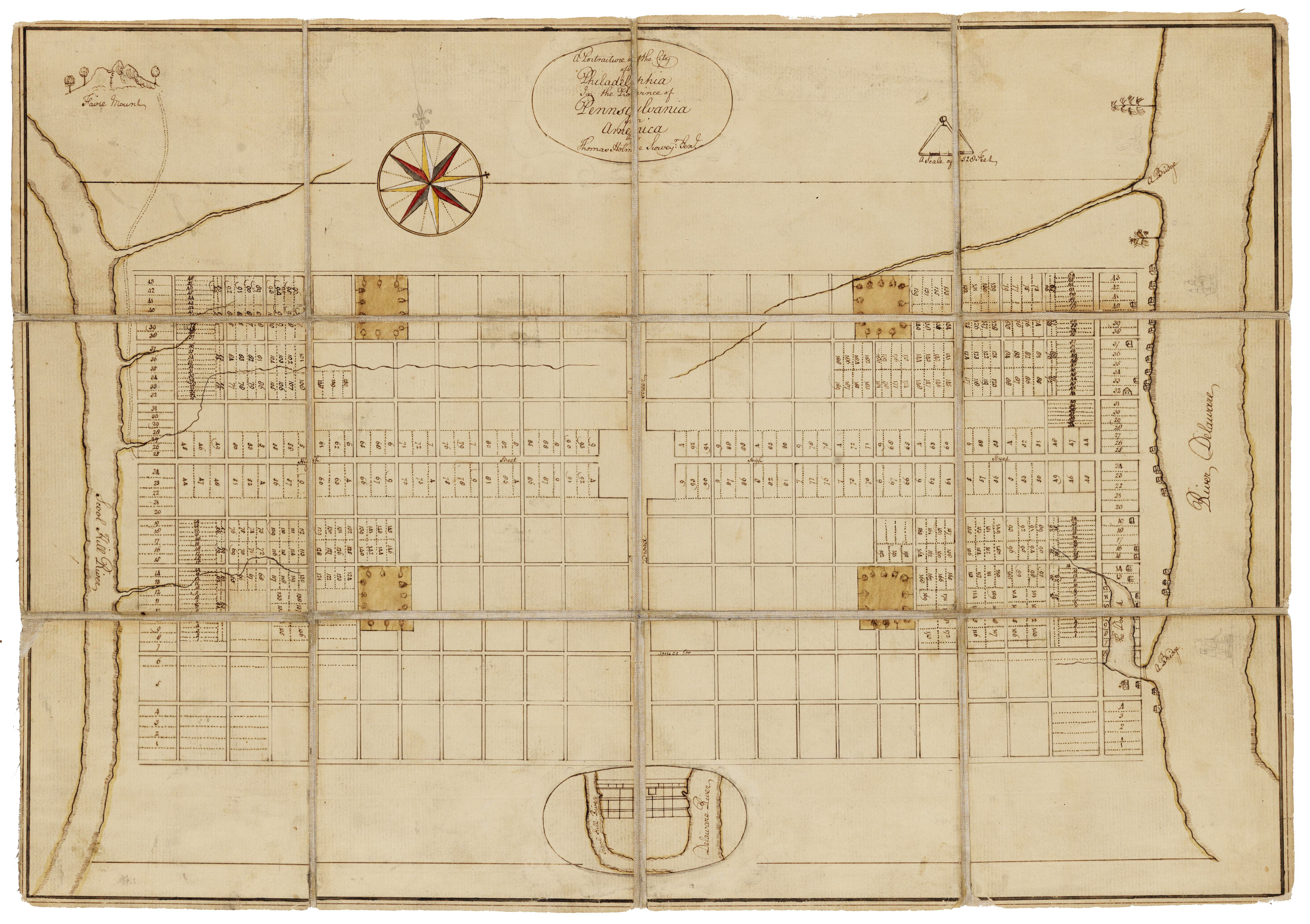
Holme's 1682 city plan for Philadelphia

Although many features of a Pennsylvania town layout come from the Thomas Holme plan for Philadelphia, with streets named (or numbered) by William Penn, some features are derived from other origins. The grid pattern has its roots in the street plan for Philadelphia. Penn’s layout, in turn, owes much to the proposal submitted by Richard Newcourt for the rebuilding of London after the Great Fire of 1666, showing both a grid pattern and a quincunx of squares. Having been in London at the time, Penn was well aware of the problems that could arise from the haphazard layout of unplanned cities.

The name “diamond” comes from early Scotch-Irish immigrants, many of whom hailed from Derry. The central square of that town was called a “diamond” and it seems that this was the source of the Pennsylvania term. Interestingly, considering the importance of Philadelphia as the prototype, the region in which classic Pennsylvania Towns are found—the Pennsylvania Cultural Area—is slightly separate from the city.

== Preservation and pressures ==
With the decline of older towns, particularly in the Rust Belt of the United States, many Pennsylvania towns have come under redevelopment pressure, posing challenges for historic preservation. Many preservation regimes have been instituted; these have often met with success. Preservation has tended to be “two-tiered”: colonial towns have different issues and results from industrial towns, although both closely resemble the modern-day urban planning ideal, with its “new urbanism”, high density, and walkability.

Industrial towns are seeing an influx of lower-income migrants, particularly Latino migrants from larger cities in the Northeastern United States, seeking affordable environments. Requests to the historic preservation board to add porches to houses that never had them are increasing, apparently connected to “Latino porch culture”. An additional challenge arises because many row houses are in poor condition; the cost of construction or renovation is comparable to that of a nearby large city, but the market value of the resulting house is considerably lower. Restoration of older row houses is often a “labor of love” and not economics.

The lower-quality brick that tended to be used to build houses for working-class residents has tended to deteriorate over time, leading to solutions that may affect the red-brick look of a row of houses. Painting the brick is the simplest solution. Formstone, a material applied to the outside of a wall and made to mimic the look of stone in various patterns and colors, has also been widely used. Restoration of houses with these treatments is problematic, as the later-added material is often expensive to remove, and frequently the underlying brick is damaged by the removal. Parts of the original brick may need to be replaced.

== Legacy ==
Although the complete Pennsylvania Town is rarely found far from the state, elements of the town plan can be found across the United States. The central “courthouse square” is a feature of innumerable Midwestern towns, and the Philadelphia street grid—which fit in well with the overall grid system of the expanding country—became a template for an urban nation, even if its amenities did not.

Some cities are more boldly laid out in the mold of the original. When St. Louis, Missouri, platted new streets in the 1820s at the behest of its Pennsylvania-born mayor, it followed the Philadelphia pattern, simply naming the streets for different trees. The 1839 Waller Plan for Austin, Texas, echoes the Philadelphia plan from tree-named streets to a set of five public squares.

== See also ==
- Waller Plan for Austin, Texas, showing the same elements
- Courthouse square, an urban design element found in many American towns
- Oglethorpe Plan for Savannah, Georgia
