= Oglethorpe Plan =

Street and land use plan for Savannah, Georgia

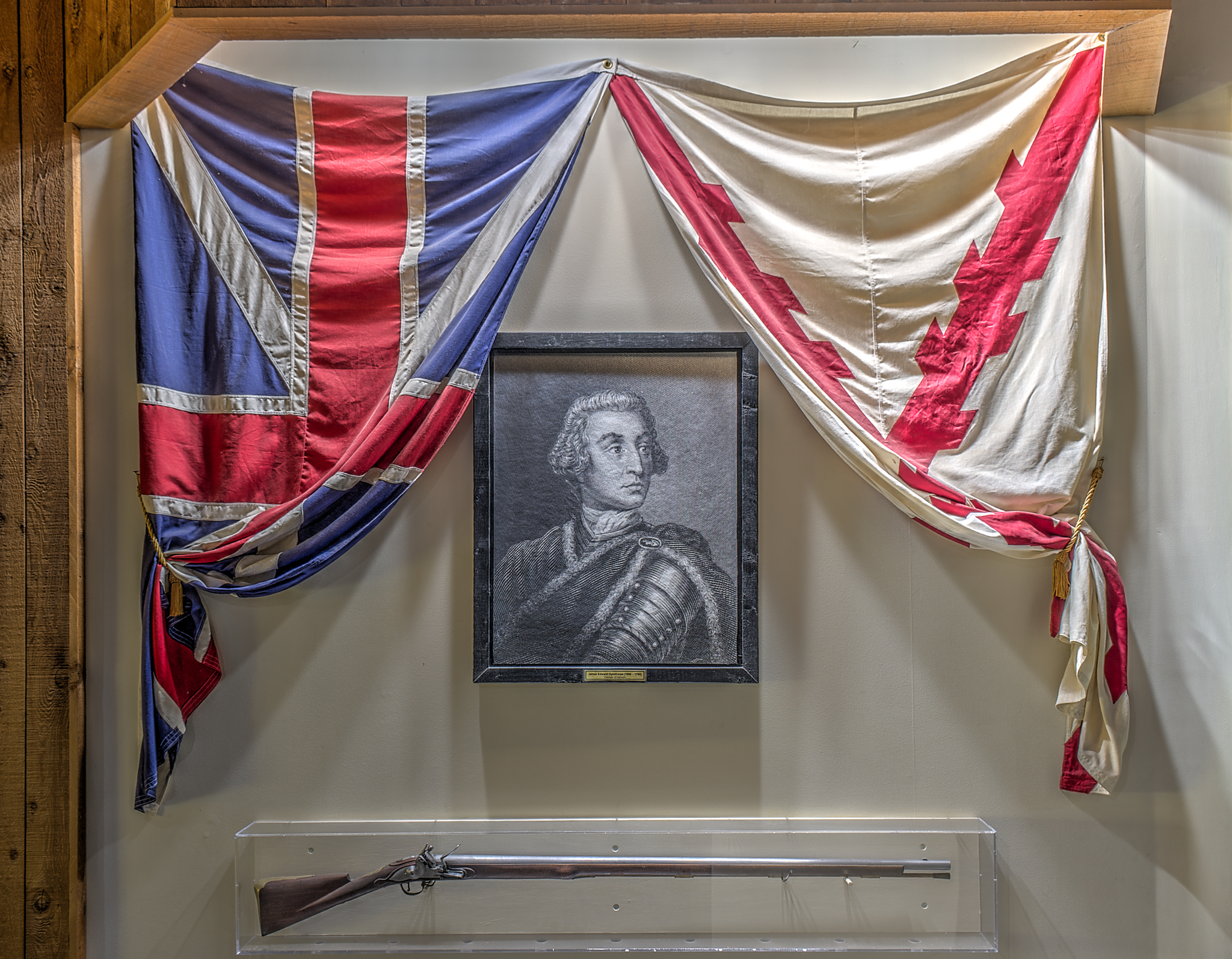
Portrait of Oglethorpe at Wormsloe Historic Site

The Oglethorpe Plan is an urban planning idea that was most notably used in Savannah, Georgia, one of the Thirteen Colonies, in the 18th century. The plan uses a distinctive street network with repeating squares of residential blocks, commercial blocks, and small green parks to create integrated, walkable neighborhoods.

James Edward Oglethorpe founded the Georgia Colony, and the town of Savannah, in 1733. The new Georgia colony was authorized under a grant from George II to a group constituted by Oglethorpe as the Trustees for the Establishment of the Colony of Georgia in America, or simply the Georgia Trustees.

Oglethorpe's plan for settlement of the new colony had been in the works since 1730, three years before the founding of Savannah. The multifaceted plan sought to achieve several goals through interrelated policy and design elements, including the spacing of towns, the layout of towns and eventually their surrounding counties, equitable allocation of land, and limits on growth to preserve a sustainable agrarian economy.

== Historical significance ==
The Oglethorpe Plan was an embodiment of all of the major themes of the Enlightenment, including science, humanism, and secular government. Georgia became the only American colony infused at its creation with Enlightenment ideals: the last of the Thirteen Colonies, it would become the first to embody the principles later embraced by the founders. Remnants of the Oglethorpe Plan exist today in Savannah, showcasing a town plan that retains the vibrancy of ideas behind its conception.

At the heart of Oglethorpe's comprehensive and multi-faceted plan there was a vision of social equity and civic virtue. The mechanisms supporting that vision, including yeoman governance, equitable land allocation, stable land tenure, prohibition of slavery, and secular administration, were among the ideas debated during the British Enlightenment. Many of those ideals have been carried forward, and are found today in Savannah's Tricentennial Plan and other policy documents.

== Sources for the Oglethorpe Plan ==
The Grand Model for the Province of Carolina was cited by the Georgia Trustees as a source of their plan for Georgia, although with the major difference that it would have neither aristocracy nor slavery. Oglethorpe wrote that the plan was conceived with "toleration" and "wholesome regulations." Benjamin Martyn, the trustees' secretary, wrote, "We are indebted to the Lord Shaftsbury, and that truly wise man Mr. Locke, for the excellent laws which they drew up for the first settlement of Carolina." Other sources are speculative, since they were not cited by Oglethorpe or the trustees. Such possible inspirations include classical planning concepts dating to Vitruvius and Roman colonial planning (e.g., Timgad), Renaissance concepts of the ideal city, and later plans such as the Vauban plan of Neuf-Brisach.

== Notable comments ==
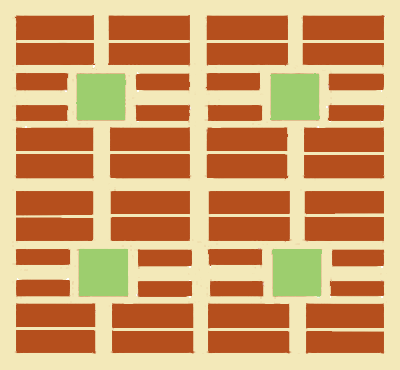
Sketch of Savannah's Town Plan showing four cellular wards, each containing eight city blocks around a square (four residential blocks in the corners, each split by a narrow lane, plus four smaller commercial blocks east and west of the square)

Many prominent planners and urban theorists have commented on various attributes of the Oglethorpe Plan, particularly the layout of Savannah. The quotes cited below are only a few of many laudatory comments.

"The famous Oglethorpe plan for Savannah ... made a unique use of the square in the design, nothing like it having appeared in a town plan before or since. Here, in Savannah, the square by frequent repetition becomes an integral part of the street pattern and creates a series of rhythmically placed openings which give a wonderful sense of space in a solidly built townscape." – Paul Zucker

"… a plan so exalted that it remains as one of the finest diagrams for city organization and growth in existence." – Edmund Bacon

"[T]he grid pattern of Savannah . . . is like no other we know in its fineness and its distinguishable squares. . . . [O]nce seen it is unforgettable, and it carries over into real life experience." – Allan Jacobs

"Savannah occupies a unique position in the history of city planning. No complete precedents exist for its pattern of multiple open spaces…." – John W. Reps

Such comments nearly always apply to the ward layout found in the Savannah Historic District, where the city preserved and elaborated on the original town plan laid out by Oglethorpe. Though seldom mentioned, notable vestiges of the Oglethorpe Plan can be found in the land use pattern surrounding Savannah; in the cities of Darien, Georgia; Brunswick, Georgia; and at Fort Frederica National Monument on St. Simons Island, Georgia.

== Implementation ==
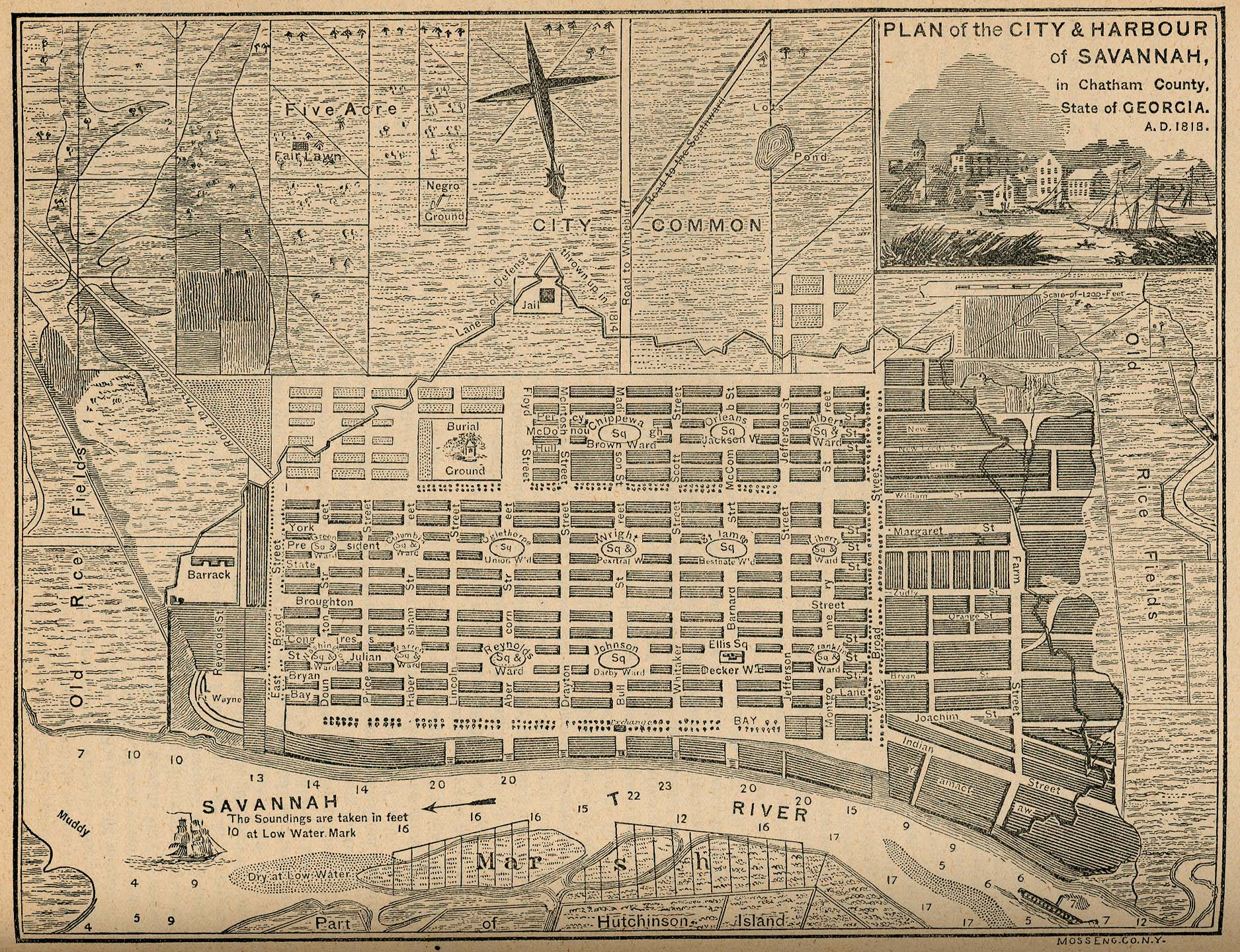
Savannah map of 1818 showing continuation of the ward design with minor modifications

Oglethorpe developed a town plan in which the basic design unit was the ward. Wards were composed of four tything (residential) blocks and four trust (civic) blocks, arrayed around a central square. The tything blocks contained ten houses, which was the basic organizational unit for administration, farming, and defense. Each tything was assigned a square mile tract outside town for farming, with each family farming a 45-acre plot within that tract. The tything trained together for militia duty, a necessity on the frontier. Families were also assigned five-acre kitchen gardens near town.

Oglethorpe's town plan was initially developed for Savannah, which grew largely in accordance with the original design. The same basic plan was intended for replication in towns throughout the colony; however, the original design survives in few towns. Brunswick, Georgia, adopted a version of the design modeled after the Trustee period.

The City of Savannah has preserved the ward design within its National Historic Landmark District. Oglethorpe originally laid out six wards in Savannah. The design proved remarkably adaptable as the city grew, and city officials perpetuated the same basic model for more than a century. Ultimately, twenty-four wards were laid out in general accordance with the original design, filling most of the original square-mile town common.

The city's modern street grid outside of the historic district follows much of the original system of rights-of-way established under the Oglethorpe Plan for the gardens, farms, and villages that made up the Savannah region.

== Legacy ==
=== Relevance of the plan today ===
Many of the principles found in the Oglethorpe Plan are as relevant today as the democratic principles articulated at the dawn of the American Revolution. Urban theorists have duly acknowledged Oglethorpe's remarkable design legacy in Savannah, but most have said little about the plan's larger purpose of fostering social equity. Urban planners and designers in Savannah have rediscovered Oglethorpe's principles of integrated town planning, incorporating them in the city's comprehensive plan and various implementing ordinances. The city's success in doing so now stands as a model inviting wider application.

The plan is fundamentally different from modern town or community plans by allowing for growth in small, interlocking units, or wards, of approximately 10 acres (4 hectares). The exact size of a ward will vary depending on the width of streets that bound it. In Savannah, streets between wards vary from 45 feet to 120 feet, including sidewalks and landscaped medians. While the size of a ward may vary, it is important to keep it within about 15 percent of Oglethorpe's original layout. In following this standard automobile traffic is naturally limited to speeds of about 20 mph (30 km/h), the threshold for pedestrian comfort in a mixed-modal, shared space environment.

Another way in which the plan is fundamentally different from most designs today is in maximizing lot coverage on buildable lots while minimizing the open space requirement on those lots. Minimizing or eliminating these standards can be done because open space is provided in the public realm. A ward contains approximately 50% developable area and 50% public area (depending on the width of bounding streets), and because the public area is shared space streets contribute to open space both aesthetically and functionally.

=== Influence in contemporary planning ===
The Savannah town plan has been praised profusely, as mentioned earlier, but no recent or contemporary replicas of it exist either in infill or suburban developments, even in Savannah's own districts that lie beyond the original square mile commons. Its cellular ward system has been cited as a unique example of fractal, or "organic", city growth in which each ward cell is a microcosm of the entire city.

Its recognized and praised advantages have recently been incorporated in a planning model, which is also cellular, that shows the influence of the Oglethorpe plan – the Fused Grid. Diagrammatic and approved plans, based on this model reflect the Savannah plan principle of organizing buildable space around open space. In this reformulated expression of it, which accommodates contemporary planning, technological and cultural priorities, Oglethorpe's Town Plan could find renewed appreciation and wider replication.

== See also ==
- Grid plan
- Commissioners' Plan of 1811
- Savannah, Georgia
- Urban planning
- Pennsylvania Town, a similar grid-and-squares plan
- Waller Plan for Austin, Texas
