= Pennsylvania Cultural Area =

In American cultural geography, the Pennsylvania Cultural Area is a region of the eastern United States marked by numerous common cultural factors associated with the state of Pennsylvania. It is a part of the Mid-Atlantic cultural area and shows a correlation with the Susquehanna Valley and Delaware Valley Subregions of the Midland Dialect Region of the American English language. It also shows a correlation with the Pretzel Belt in Pennsylvania.

== Formation/origin and spread ==
During the colonial period, a regionally distinctive cultural complex developed in southeastern Pennsylvania and adjoining sections of Maryland, which were claimed by Pennsylvania before the settlement that led to the surveying of the Mason-Dixon Line. The characteristics of the Pennsylvania Cultural Area were imported by a variety of immigrants from the British Isles and the German Rhineland. Interacting with and influenced by the environment, these characteristics produced a new landscape and mindset, shown in distinctive settlement features, speech patterns, foods, religious groups, agricultural practices, and other traits.

This distinctive Pennsylvania culture spread west from the “hearth” region around Philadelphia along what became the Philadelphia and Lancaster Turnpike and the Forbes Road, and southwest along the Great Wagon Road, as shown in the Fry-Jefferson map of Virginia. The spread was affected by physical geography, and as a result the boundaries of the Pennsylvania Cultural Area are not contiguous with the political boundaries of the state. Northern Pennsylvania contains the fringe of the New England Extended region, and has more in common with upstate New York than it does with the southern part of the state. Meanwhile, the Pennsylvania influence extends up the Shenandoah Valley a considerable distance south of the Mason-Dixon Line. The westernmost part of the state bears a Midwestern flavor, while Pennsylvania influences can be found scattered across much of the Midwest and beyond, particularly in the greater Ohio Valley and the Old Northwest.

== Elements ==
There are a number of elements common to the Pennsylvania Cultural area. These include towns with a central courthouse square, the use of the bank barn in general and the forebay barn in particular, and municipalities named Franklin or Wayne. Reflecting Pennsylvania's location in the Midland dialect region of American English, other place names follow distinctive patterns as well.

The “Courthouse square” is an aspect of Pennsylvania culture, spreading beyond the generally accepted boundaries of the Pennsylvania Cultural area. From its roots in Philadelphia, it has become a feature of the American Midwest. Many communities have open central squares, around which are clustered the principal business and public buildings of the town. Chief among these buildings in a county seat is the courthouse, which is also often the grandest structure in the town. In many county seats, the courthouse occupies a position along the edge of the square, facing the square itself. In some, the courthouse is built in the square, with the other prominent buildings around it. The open square is found in towns that are not county seats as well.

One of the most distinctive aspects of the Pennsylvania Cultural Area appears in the architecture of barns. The original bank barn (a barn built on a slope, so that different floors may be reached from ground level on different sides of the barn) grew into the forebay barn, in which the second level extends out over the first level, forming a sort of porch over the entrance(s) to the lower level. Although the forebay barn is sometimes known as a Pennsylvania barn, it can be found across the Upper Midwest and in much of Appalachia.

As the young United States expanded, nationalistic names were attached to many new (or newly discovered) geographical features. As Pennsylvanians settled in the rest of the country, they often named locations, particularly new towns, for heroic figures in the formation and organization of the new nation. Many counties, towns, etc., in the Midwest and farther west were named Franklin (for Benjamin (Note: See, e.g., List of places named for Benjamin Franklin.)) or Wayne (for Anthony (Note: See, e.g., List of memorials to Anthony Wayne.)). In this way the influence of Pennsylvania culture was carried and endures far beyond the state's borders.

As for geographical features, one of the distinctive traits of the Midland dialect region (in which the Pennsylvania cultural area is squarely located) is the use of particular words in place names. The word “run”—for a small stream—is extensively found in the Midland region and thus in the Pennsylvania Cultural Area; New Englanders tend to use “brook”, while “branch” is a Southern term. Midlanders show a preference for the suffixes -town and -burg, and in the Pennsylvania Cultural Area, there is a strikingly high occurrence of the terms “city” and “square” in the names of small towns and villages.
