= Numbered street =

Street whose name is an ordinal number

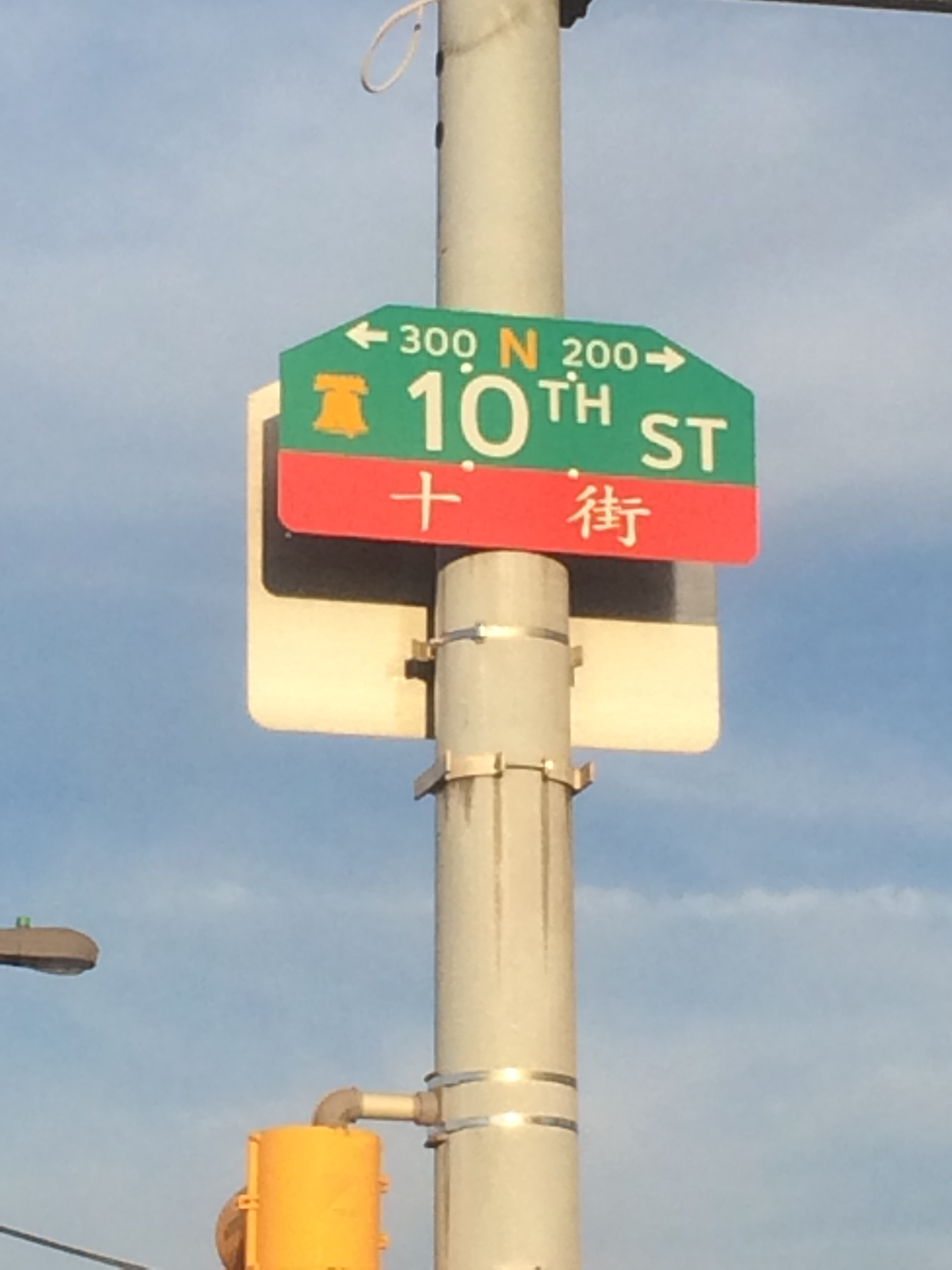
Philadelphia's 10th Street written in English and Chinese

A numbered street is a street whose name is an ordinal number, as in Second Street or Tenth Avenue. Such forms are among the most common street names in North America, but also exist in other parts of the world, especially in Colombia, which takes the system to an extreme, and the Middle East. Numbered streets were first used in Philadelphia and now exist in many major cities and small towns. Grid-based naming systems usually start at 1 (but sometimes at a higher number or even at zero), and then proceed in numerical order. In the United States, seven out of the top ten most common street names are numbers, with the top three names being "2nd," "3rd," and "1st" respectively. Streets named "0th" are quite uncommon, however, but do exist (sometimes spelled out "Zero Street") (like 0 Avenue in BC, Canada), and negative numbered streets (i.e, "−1st", "−2nd", etc.) are extraordinarily rare. Fractional numbered streets exist in some places, such as 10 1/2 Street in Springfield, Illinois.

Some cities also have lettered street names. For example, Washington, D.C., in addition to having numbered streets, also has streets identified as a letter followed by "Street," going as high as the letter W. New York City has avenues titled "Avenue" followed by the respective letter of the alphabet, such as Avenue D. The idea for such a system was developed by Pierre Charles L'Enfant, who devised the system for Washington.

The numbered street system is criticized for taking away the individuality from a community that a named street would provide.

== United States and Canada ==
=== United States ===
==== Baltimore ====
34th Street in Baltimore

Baltimore, Maryland, has numbered streets in the north-central part of the city. The numbered streets in Baltimore do not begin with 1, but rather start with 20th Street just north of and parallel to North Avenue, the former northern boundary of the city, and what is viewed by many today is the northern boundary of Downtown Baltimore. The numbered streets, which go as high as 43rd Street, correspond with the first two digits in the addresses of the north–south streets they cross. Unlike in Washington, where the numbered streets run north–south, Baltimore's numbered streets run west–east. All begin their names with either "West" or "East," depending on which side of Charles Street the block is located.

Some of Baltimore's numbered streets are well known for various reasons. 28th and 29th streets, a one-way pair, are the only numbered streets to have an interchange with I-83. They use the numbered designations to the east of the expressway, and to the west, they merge into a six-lane road known as Druid Park Lake Drive. East 33rd Street was the location of the now-demolished Baltimore Memorial Stadium, home to the Baltimore Orioles for 38 years and the Baltimore Colts for 31. West 34th Street is the location of the annual Miracle on 34th Street, where residents on one block of the street open their porches to tourists to view their holiday decorations. West 40th Street is the location of The Rotunda shopping mall, and it merges into West 41st Street, which crosses over, but does not have an interchange with, I-83 into Television Hill and is the only numbered street in the city west of I-83.

==== Chicago ====
The City of Chicago is set on a grid with eight "standard" city blocks per mile. Some blocks are further divided in half. A standard block has 100 address numbers, meaning there are 800 numbers per mile. Chicago address numbering begins downtown at State Street and Madison Street; State Street is 0 east and west, and Madison Street is 0 north and south. Major streets a mile apart have address numbers that, for the most part, are multiples of 800.

The south side of the city uses numbered east–west streets, although older streets that were already named retained their names, particularly in the Loop. As stated above, Chicago house numbers are generally assigned at the rate of 8 blocks to a mile. The only exceptions are from Madison to 31st Street, just south of downtown.

The first two main numbered roads in the system were renamed for historical figures after the numbering system was adopted. Roosevelt Road (previously 12th Street and renamed for Theodore Roosevelt) is one mile south of Madison with 12 blocks to the mile, Cermak Road (previously 22nd Street and renamed in memory of assassinated mayor Anton Cermak) is two miles south of Madison with 10 blocks to the mile, and 31st Street (3100 S) is three miles south of Madison with 9 blocks to the mile. South of 31st Street, the pattern of 8 blocks to the mile resumes, with 39th Street the next major street, 47th after that, and so on.

The numbering within Chicago is continued in many suburbs south of the city proper. For instance, Chicago Heights has a 185th Street, set on the same numbering scheme.

Chicago's numbered street system was established in 1911 by legislation that made Madison Street the base for the numbering of east–west streets, and State Street for north–south streets.

==== Cleveland ====
Streets Courts Ontario Street (East–West dividing line) Martin Luther King Junior Drive

As a general rule, the only numbered streets in Cleveland run generally north–south, while streets that run parallel to the Lake Erie shoreline (generally east–west) have names rather than numbers. Public Square in downtown Cleveland separates east- and west-numbered streets, with the numbers increasing in both directions as one travels further away from Public Square, in a system initiated in 1906. Conforming east–west roads are given a name, rather than a number, and the suffix "Avenue." Where an avenue crosses Ontario Street or the Cuyahoga River, its name changes, meaning that a numbered street does not intersect a given avenue more than once. For example, stating a location as "65th and Detroit" implies West 65th Street, since Detroit Avenue changes to Superior Avenue when it crosses the river. Non-conforming streets are suffixed with names other than "street" or "avenue," e.g., West Boulevard, Old River Road, Martin Luther King Jr. Drive. Geographic idiosyncrasies in certain parts of the city mean that this is by no means an absolute rule but generally applies within the city proper. The street numbering extends from West 233rd in North Olmsted to East 367th in Eastlake.

==== Denver ====
Denver has two systems in place in two distinct areas of the city. Downtown Denver's diagonal street system technically begins with 4th Street near Auraria Campus, underneath the Colfax Avenue viaduct. The system then counts up northeastward from 4th Street to 40th Street. The diagonal system meets the normal numbered grid at various points, with the termination of the downtown system at 40th Avenue and 40th Street in the Five Points neighborhood.

The second system is a typical East/West layout, with directional indicators. First Avenue is adjacent to Ellsworth Avenue in Central Denver; the series extends to 168th Avenue in unincorporated Adams County. Exceptions include Colfax Avenue, which takes the place of 15th Avenue, and Martin Luther King Jr. Boulevard, which generally takes the place of East 32nd Avenue. The designations East and North are generally not used unless needed. Building numbers on cross-streets reflect the street numbering; for example, 1800 Colorado Boulevard would be at the corner of 18th Avenue. (1800 South Colorado Boulevard is outside the area of numbered streets.)

==== Detroit ====
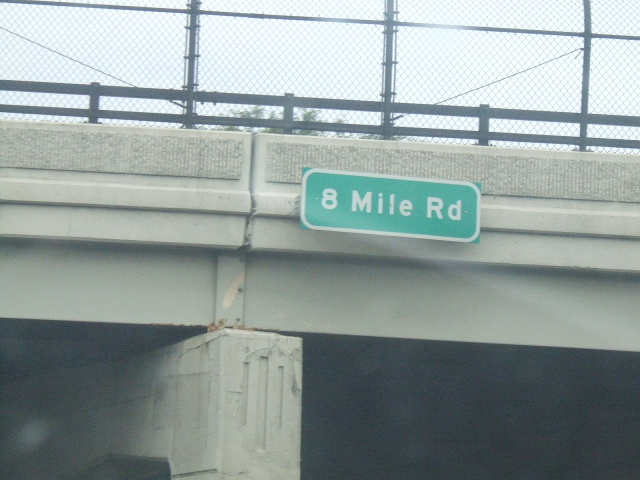
8 Mile Road overpass

In the northern suburbs of Detroit, "___ Mile Road" runs east–west, a stated number of miles from the center of Detroit. Some of these roads are also known by other names. The lowest numbered road is 5 Mile Road, while the city limits end at 8 Mile Road, which at one time was called "Baseline Road". The highest such numbered road is 38 Mile Road, which is mostly in Almont.

The city of Detroit also has some conventional numbered streets within the city limits.

==== Los Angeles ====
In the city of Los Angeles, all numbered streets begin from the historic corner of First and Main and are numbered according to the distance from there in their respective quadrants.

==== Greater Miami ====
In Greater Miami, numbered streets go into the three digits, with varying, overlapping sets of numbered streets. The area has roads that are named as a number followed by "Street" that runs west–east, and a number followed by "Avenue" that runs north–south. All these streets start their names with NW, NE, SW, or SE, depending on where they are in relation to the center of Miami.

In the Miami suburbs, some numbered streets and avenues are paired with a parallel "Court", "Drive", "Place" or "Terrace"; while in the same area, other sets of numbered streets and avenues exist with lower numbers, such as in Hialeah, where W 68th St is also designated NW 122 St . This is known to lead to confusion among some, especially non-locals.

Similar numbering systems are used throughout the state of Florida, such as in Gainesville, Ocala, Panama City, and Jacksonville.

==== New York City ====
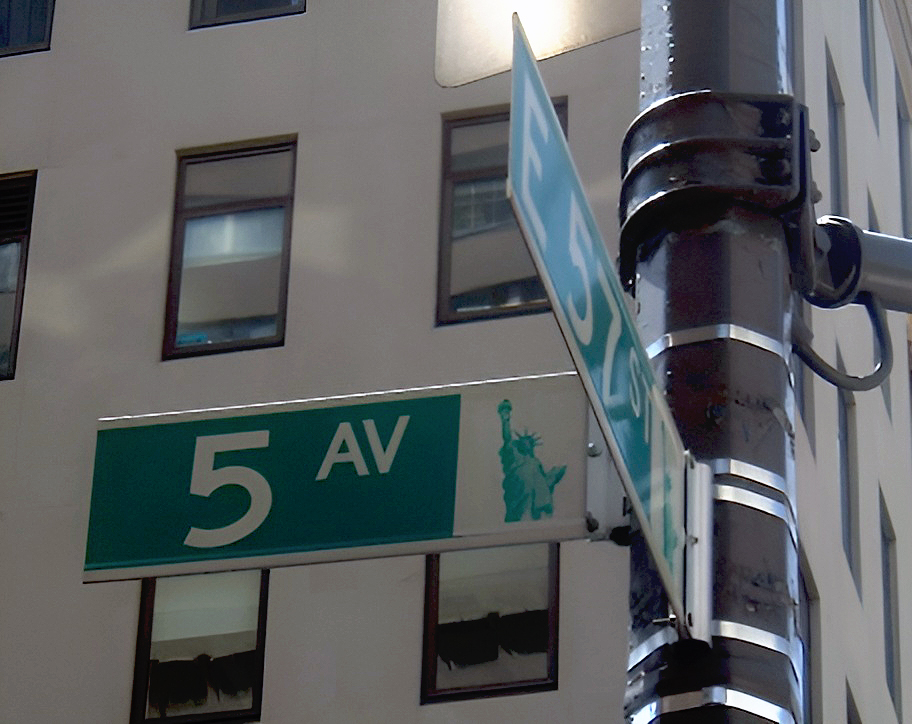
Fifth Avenue and E. 57th Street in Manhattan

The Commissioners' Plan of 1811 laid out the grid that covers most of Manhattan today. Most east–west streets (which actually run southeast–northwest) are named "___th Street", and a few major north–south streets (which actually run northeast–southwest, roughly parallel to the island's long axis) are named "___th Avenue".

The highest-numbered street on Manhattan Island is 220th Street, and the highest-numbered street in the Borough of Manhattan is 228th Street.

The Manhattan numbered street grid continues north in The Bronx, where the highest numbered street is West 263rd Street on the border of Yonkers. The only numbered avenue in The Bronx is a continuation of Manhattan's Third Avenue.

In Queens, the melding of various grids from pre-consolidation villages resulted in repeat numbers, for example, 31st Street, 31st Place, 31st Lane, and their perpendicular counterparts 31st Avenue, 31st Road, and 31st Drive. Streets, Places and Lanes run north to south, while Avenues, Roads, and Drives run east to west. Avenues run from 2nd Avenue in Whitestone to 165th Avenue in Howard Beach. Streets run from 1st Street in Astoria to 271st Street in Glen Oaks.

In Brooklyn, there are ten sets of numbered streets (unprefixed numbered streets as well as North, South, East, West, Bay, Brighton, Paerdegat, Plumb, and Flatlands numbered streets), along with numbered avenues up to 28th Avenue and letter avenues up to Avenue Z. Manhattan's Alphabet City consists of Avenues A through D.

The Rockaways section of Queens has streets prefixed with the word Beach. However, street signs in this area typically identify this prefix using only the letter B (e.g. "B 116 St"). The neighborhood of Broad Channel also has its own network of numbered roads, prefixed with East or West, relative to Cross Bay Boulevard.

The closest cross street to a given building number in Manhattan can be estimated using the Manhattan address algorithm.

The highest-numbered street in all of New York City is 271st Street, in Glen Oaks, Queens. 704th Street in Orangeburg, New York is the highest-numbered street in the Greater New York City area, and at one point was the highest-numbered street in the United States. The highest-numbered Avenue in Manhattan is the obscure Thirteenth Avenue, on Gansevoort Peninsula in the Hudson River just north of Gansevoort Street. Currently, only one unmarked block remains, currently used as a garbage truck access behind the Bloomfield Street Sanitation Depot. The street was once longer, but much of the land it was built on was removed to provide longer piers for berthing larger ships, such as RMS Lusitania and RMS Titanic, without protruding further into the Hudson River. Twelfth Avenue is the highest numbered avenue that is signed by the city and accessible to the public. Higher-numbered avenues exist in other boroughs.

Sixth and a Half Avenue is the only numbered avenue in Manhattan involving fractions.

==== Philadelphia ====
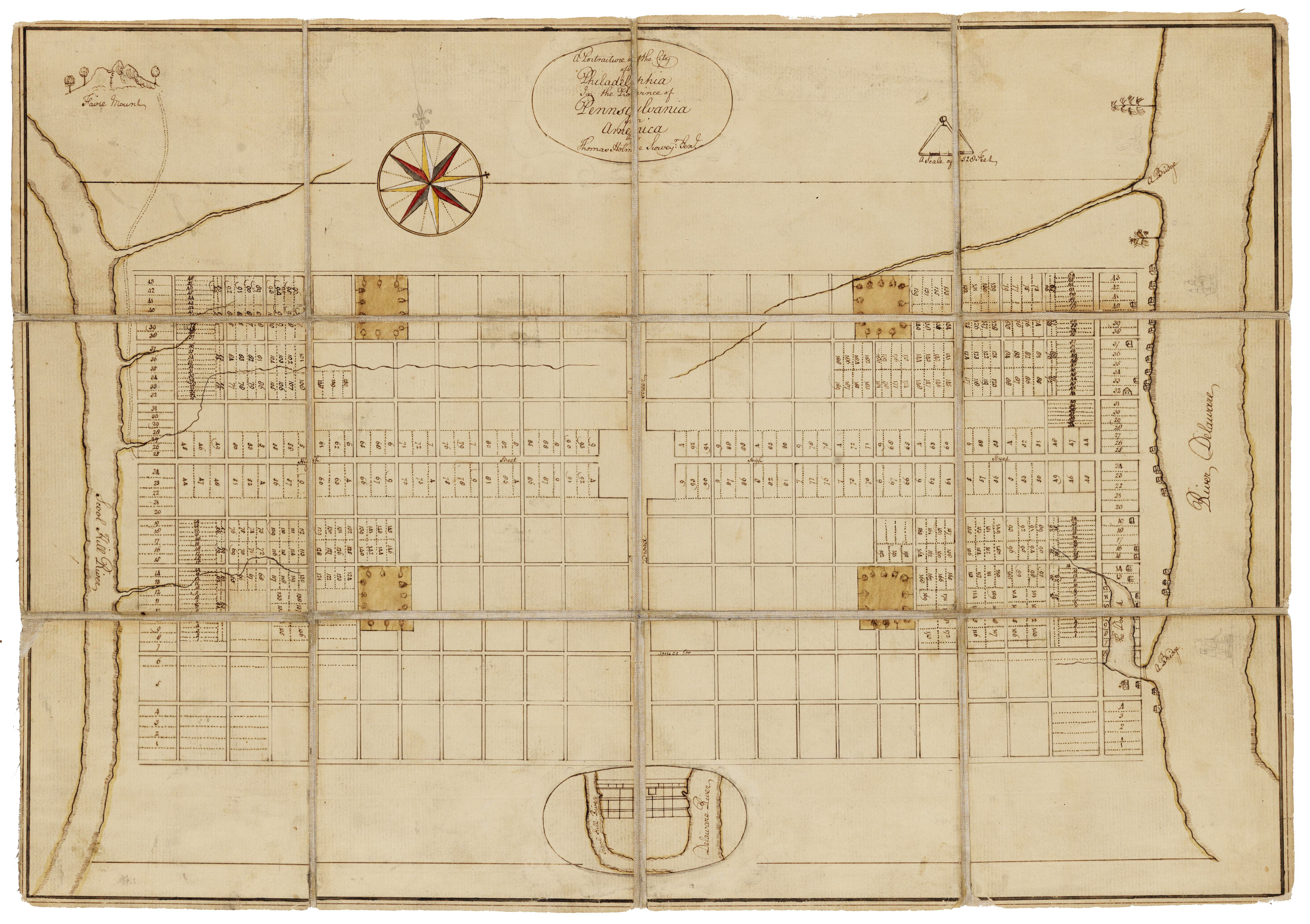
Original street plan of Center City Philadelphia

Central Philadelphia was laid out by Thomas Holme in 1683 and was the first city to use numbered streets systematically. While the original plan had two sets of north–south numbered streets, one parallel to the Delaware River and one to the Schuylkill; all are now numbered from the Delaware, with numbers increasing westward and continuing across the Schuylkill through West Philadelphia to the edge of the city. There are two main exceptions to this pattern: Holme's plan included Front Street in place of First and Broad Street in place of Fourteenth; "Schuylkill Front Street" became 22nd when the streets west of Broad were renumbered. The highest numbered street is 90th Street. In Southwest Philadelphia, the grid is oblique, with numbered streets running from northwest to southeast and meeting their West Philadelphia equivalents at Baltimore Avenue. In general, numbered streets northwest of the Schuylkill are not aligned with their counterparts across the river in South Philadelphia.

The Kensington area has streets lettered "A" through "O". The East Oak Lane and West Oak Lane sections of the city contains east–west streets numbered from 64th Avenue to 80th Avenue, with the numbers correspondent with the block numbers north from Market Street.

In the early 20th century, many of Chestnut Hill's previously numbered streets were renamed for Native American tribes.

==== Phoenix ====
In Phoenix, Arizona, the north-south streets used a numbered system, with the center street being Central Avenue. Streets west of Central Avenue are named "avenue", thus, for example, 33rd Avenue is the thirty-third street west of Central Avenue. Streets east of Central Avenue are named "street", thus, for example, 27th Street is the twenty-seventh street east of Central Avenue. These streets and avenues are further divided into, for example, "North 9th Street" and "South 9th Street", with the dividing line being a line extending from Washington Street. East-west streets are not named using a numbered system. Adjacent municipalities, such as Glendale and Peoria, continue this grid system, although there are exceptional streets that do not follow the numbered street convention.

==== Pittsburgh ====
In the city of Pittsburgh, the numbered streets were originally named streets that were perpendicular to the Allegheny River. Sixth Street, for example, was originally named St. Clair Street. The numbered streets were created by an ordinance passed in 1868.

==== San Francisco ====
San Francisco has two numbered series: streets, which run generally east–west, and avenues, which are north–south. The two series do not meet, nor are house numbers coordinated with cross streets' numbers.

The numbered streets begin with 1st Street in SoMa and end with 30th Street in Noe Valley. Some of these streets are only nominally east–west, which causes anomalies such as 3rd Street meeting 26th Street in the Dogpatch.

The numbered avenues are in the Richmond and Sunset Districts beginning with 2nd Avenue and continuing westward to 48th Avenue, which runs parallel to the Pacific Ocean shore.

==== St. Louis ====
Number streets of St. Louis, Missouri, start at the Mississippi River and increase as they go west. Over time, the various municipalities took over and renamed most of the numbered streets with names. However, a few numbered streets remained.

==== Washington, D.C. ====
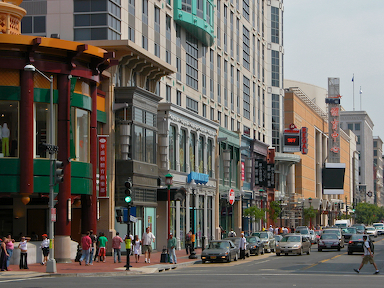
7th St and H Street, N.W, in Washington, D.C.

Pierre L'Enfant's plan for Washington, D.C. includes both radial avenues and grid system consisting of both numbered and lettered streets. North–south streets are named with numbers, such as "7th Street," and west–east streets are named with letters, such as "H Street." The name is then followed with a directional suffix (NW, NE, SW, or SE), specifying a quadrant of the city (e.g. B Street Southwest). The quadrants meet at the U.S. Capitol building.

Within the city, the quadrants are divided by three streets known as North, East, and South Capitol Streets, and by the National Mall, which takes the place of the non-existent West Capitol Street. Numbers start counting upward on either side of North and South Capitol Streets, and letters start counting upward on either side of East Capitol Street and the National Mall.

==== Statewide systems ====
- North Dakota
  - Burkle addressing system
- Utah

=== Canada ===
==== Calgary ====
The city of Calgary uses a quadrant system with a grid set. The east–west demarcation line separating the north and south is the Bow River west of Nose Creek, Centre Avenue directly east of Nose Creek, and Memorial Drive east of 36th Street. The north–south line is Centre Street north of Glenmore Trail and Macleod Trail south of Glenmore Trail. Streets run north–south and avenues run east–west; both are numbered beginning at the demarcation lines. Many older areas also have "A" and "B" streets interspersed between the numbered streets; for instance, in most older neighbourhoods the street directly west of Centre Street is 1st Street, but a Centre A Street runs for short distances in certain areas. Suburban neighbourhoods built since approximately 1971 tend to have named streets except in cases where numbered streets extend into the district. A typical (if fictional) street address in an older district would be "4214-19A Street SW". As a result, addresses of buildings on numbered streets are worthless unless the quadrant (SW, NW, NE, SE) is indicated.

The grid is based on the Dominion Land Survey, with many of the main roads in the older areas of town (such as Crowchild Trail SW and 17th Avenue SE) following the lines that separate one DLS section from another ("section lines").

Avenues in the Municipal District of Foothills No. 31 south of Calgary are numbered as they would be if they were in the city (with quadrant omitted). However, the basis for numbered streets in the Municipal District of Foothills (the "zero" street) is the Fifth Meridian (114° west), approximately 3 kilometres (1.9 mi) east of Calgary's Centre Street. Streets are then numbered east and west with 16 streets for each one-mile grid road – or one street number per 100 m. This leads to situations at the south city limit where the street number changes (e.g. 85 Street SW changes to 144 Street W). The impetus for this came originally from emergency response groups, such as fire departments and police.

Rocky View County, which surrounds Calgary to the east, west and north, uses a different system of road numbers based on the Alberta Township System for land surveys. In Rocky View, range roads run north–south and are numbered in 1-mile (1.6 km) (the boundary of one survey section) increments west from the nearest survey range line (e.g. Range Road 51 is 1 mile west of the east edge of Range 5 west of the 5th Meridian). Township roads are east–west roads numbered in similar increments north of survey township lines (e.g. Township Road 264 is 4 miles north of the south edge of Township 26). Addressing is based on the distance west or north from the nearest crossroad (e.g. 264054 Range Road 51 would be north of Township Road 264). Roads ending in 0 are on their respective range or township lines. Suffixed roads (e.g. ending with an "A", "B", etc...) are between section lines (e.g. along "quarter" lines which split the 640-acre sections into smaller quarter-sections).

==== Edmonton ====
The city of Edmonton's grid system is similar in nature to Calgary's, except that the two roads designated at the "center" of Edmonton were numbered 101st (Jasper) Avenue and 101st (Main) Street. This was done to eliminate the possibility that the city would have quadrants as Calgary does. The gradual expansion of the city now extends it east and south of what is 1st (Meridian) Street and 1st (Quadrant) Avenue. As a result, most of the city is officially in the northwest quadrant, but common practice is to not refer to the quadrant unless the address being mentioned is not in the northwest quadrant. The city limits do not yet extend into where the southeast quadrant would be located, meaning addresses will be post-fixed with either NW, SW, or NE.

==== Metro Vancouver ====
A grid system of numbered streets and avenues is used south of the Fraser River, in the municipalities of Delta, Surrey and Langley. Avenues run east–west and are numbered starting with 0 ("Zero") avenue next to the Canada–US border and going north, with the numbers incrementing each 1/8 mile (200 m). Streets run north–south and are numbered starting with zero lying in the Strait of Georgia and going east, with the numbers incrementing each 1/8 mile, just like the avenues. Minor streets named with a number followed by a letter (136A Street, 136B street) are situated between the numbers.

The city of Vancouver proper uses its own road numbering system, numbering east–west avenues from first at False Creek and incrementing south. Avenues are further classified with an "East" or "West" prefix (e.g. E 41st Ave). Ontario Street (two blocks west of Main Street) demarcates the boundary for this prefix. The highest numbered street in the city is W 77th Avenue, in an industrial area of the Marpole neighbourhood.

Similarly, the city of New Westminster has its own numbering system with avenues northeast–southwest and streets northwest–southeast. This numbered grid continues into southeastern parts of neighbouring Burnaby.

==== Other Canadian cities and towns ====
Many small towns and cities in Western Canada use numbered streets. Some begin numbering at Centre or Main (0) as Calgary does, but others follow Edmonton's example and begin numbering at 1, 50, or 100. Examples include Brandon, Manitoba, where streets, running north–south, are numbered; and Red Deer, Alberta, where numbered streets run east–west, and numbered avenues run north–south. In Saskatoon, Saskatchewan only the streets, running east–west, are numbered (aside from avenues downtown, which is numbered from 1st to 10th); there are lettered avenues to the west of Idylwyld Drive, which was formerly known as Avenue A (a stub of Avenue A does remain south of 20th Street though). Streets in the Sutherland district in Saskatoon have numbered 101 St to 117 St. This was done when the town of Sutherland amalgamated with Saskatoon, to avoid confusion with Saskatoon's numbered streets, which run from 1 to 71.

Numerous street numbering schemes were proposed for the various municipalities originally making up Greater Winnipeg, but most were quickly rescinded, as the city is not built on a uniform grid and numbering was considered unwieldy. Only one roadway (Fifth Avenue in St. Vital) retains its "number", but the street name is legally the word "Fifth" and not the number. Numbered roadways are also found within Canadian Forces Base Winnipeg, but the street names within the base were chosen by the Department of National Defence and not by the city itself.

Numbered streets are less common in Eastern Canada, with some notable exceptions. Owen Sound, Ontario, is one of the few cities that primarily use numbered streets and avenues. Saint-Georges, Quebec has a numbered system of streets/rues and avenues that extends into the surrounding Chaudière-Appalaches region. Many urban enclaves were established with numbered streets or avenues as part of their distinct character. Ottawa has several numbered roads, notably in The Glebe, with avenues numbered First to Fifth. New Toronto has numbered streets, running westward off of Lake Shore Boulevard, starting at 1st Street (just west of Royal York Road), to 43rd Street, excluding Eighteenth Street and Thirty-Fourth Street, as Kipling Avenue and the Long Branch Avenue replace them, respectively. The city of St. John's, Newfoundland and Labrador has a single numbered street called 18th Street, in the Waterford Valley area; it is unclear how this name originated or whether this street was meant to form part of a larger grid system.

== Latin America ==
=== Argentina ===
Cities built on a grid plan in the interior of Argentina tend to use numbers for their streets, in the familiar even versus odd configuration, with the notable exception of La Plata, where the numbering is consecutive.

=== Brazil ===
Some cities (such as Goiânia and Rio Claro) use numbered streets, though main streets might receive different names.

=== Colombia ===
All 1,119 municipalities of Colombia have numbered streets divided into a grid, with numbered calles intersecting numbered carreras, and the government of Colombia has a complete nomenclature to classify the streets. Occasionally main streets receive names, like El Dorado Avenue in the capital Bogotá.

=== Cuba ===
Havana has even-numbered streets running north–south, and odd-numbered streets running east–west on the west side of the city, with lettered streets from A through P running north–south beginning on the east side of Paseo Avenue. Some streets are named with a number followed by a letter (23 B Street).

== Europe ==
=== Austria ===
Kematen an der Ybbs, a Marktgemeinde with 2,700 inhabitants (in 2026) in Lower Austria has numbered its streets in 1966. After the suggestion of a member of the municipal council, who had been to New York City. 1. Straße is the through road. 6. Straße has sideways 6. a to 6. c and after a bend is named 6. d Straße. Numbers reach 33.

Graz has only one: 3. Südgürtel (Third South Belt). But there are some street names after numbered old military units, e.g. Dreierschützengasse (3).

=== Germany ===
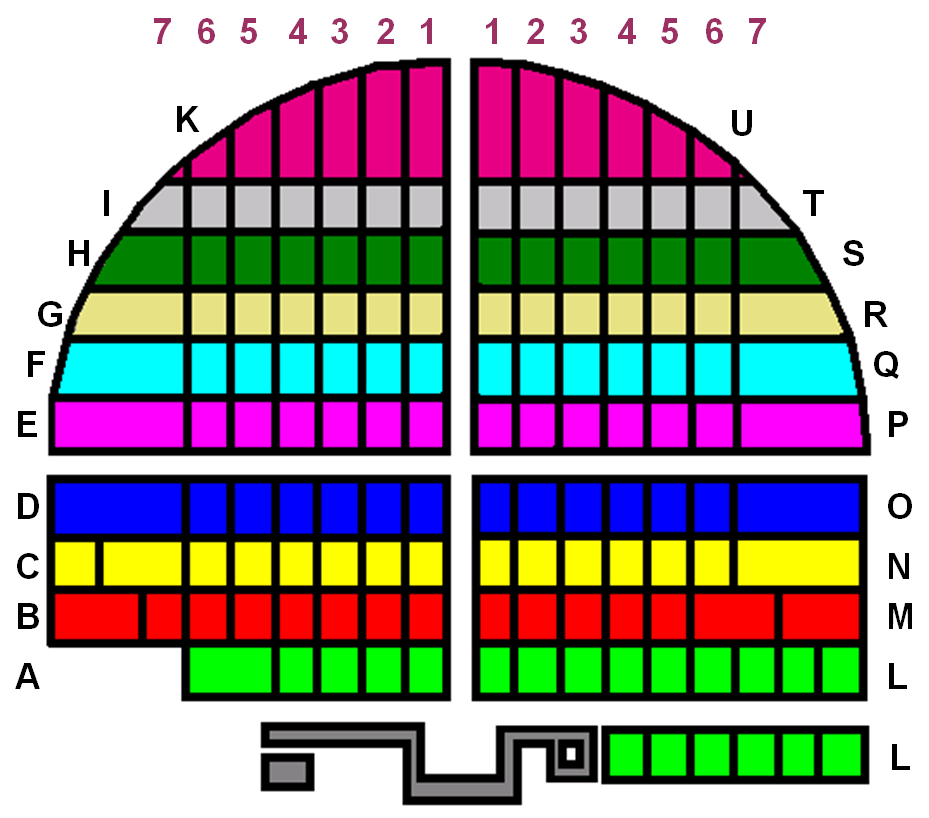
Map of Mannheim's city center

A notable European example is the city center of Mannheim, where blocks are numbered in a grid-like system since 1811, and streets actually do not have names anymore—for example the houses in "street" B7 are those in the block in grid B7. The houses on the other side of the street belong to other blocks and therefore have another street name.

=== Hungary ===
In the capital city Budapest, there are some outer districts which have areas with numbered streets (and in one case, a numbered square), like Akadémiaújtelep. These areas are planned communities built in the 1950s.

=== Netherlands ===
In Lelystad, some streets have a combination of names and numbers. The streets with the same name (but different number) are in the same area. In Botter the names are Botter and Tjalk, in Galjoen the names are Galjoen and Jol, in Schouw the names are Schouw and Gondel, although there are "normal" names there, etc. There are also other cities with similar numbering like Wijchen and Nijmegen.

=== Portugal ===
A notable example of a citywide numbered streets system in Portugal, is the city of Espinho. Espinho, in the district of Aveiro, was mainly built in the late 19th century in a grid pattern, with its streets being numbered instead of being named. Streets running north–south are numbered with even numbers and streets running west–east are numbered with odd numbers.

Numbered streets are also occasionally used in other Portuguese cities, but only in specific areas within them and not as a citywide system. This happens mainly in newly built neighborhoods, especially those planned in a grid pattern.

=== United Kingdom ===
With the notable exception of Milton Keynes, numbered streets are uncommon in the United Kingdom because cities and towns are generally not laid out in grids. However, the Village, a small area of Trafford Park is laid out in a grid pattern. It has north–south streets numbered from First Avenue in the east to Fifth Avenue in the west, and west–east streets numbered from Fifth Street in the south to Eleventh Street in the north. Birmingham has First to Fourth Avenues, but these are not part of a logical sequence, and Fifth Avenue is in another part of the city. The former mining town of Newtongrange in Midlothian, Scotland has residential streets numbered from First Street to Tenth Street. Another former mining settlement, the village of Horden in County Durham, has a series of numbered streets which were built to house workers at the local colliery, but today suffer from extreme poverty and high levels of crime.

== Asia ==
=== Hong Kong ===
In Hong Kong, in the Sai Ying Pun neighbourhood, there are a series of streets named with numbers. They are part of a planned layout of the early development of Hong Kong. See First Street, Second Street and Third Street. In the Fairview Park development in the northwestern New Territories many streets are numbered, with sections named by alphabets. A similar system is used in Hong Lok Yuen to the north of Tai Po New Town in northeastern New Territories.

=== Iran ===
In Tehran there are multiple sets of numbered streets running from west to east in various sections of the north side of town. In many such sections, the street numbers count upward by two, with even-numbered streets on one side of a neighborhood, and odd-numbered streets on the other. The highest numbered street is 304th Street. The city also has other series of streets with a name combining with a number.

=== United Arab Emirates ===
In the United Arab Emirates, most streets and roads are numbered. Most commonly in smaller cities, they are identified with a 4-digit number followed by "way". Abu Dhabi has even-numbered streets running west–east, and odd-numbered streets running north–south. Dubai has numbered streets that simply have the number followed by "street" (e.g. 41st Street), as well as streets named with a number followed by a letter (23 B Street).

== See also ==
- House numbering, which often forms an integrated system with numbered streets
- Street name
- Road number
