= 6½ Avenue =

Pedestrian path in Manhattan, New York

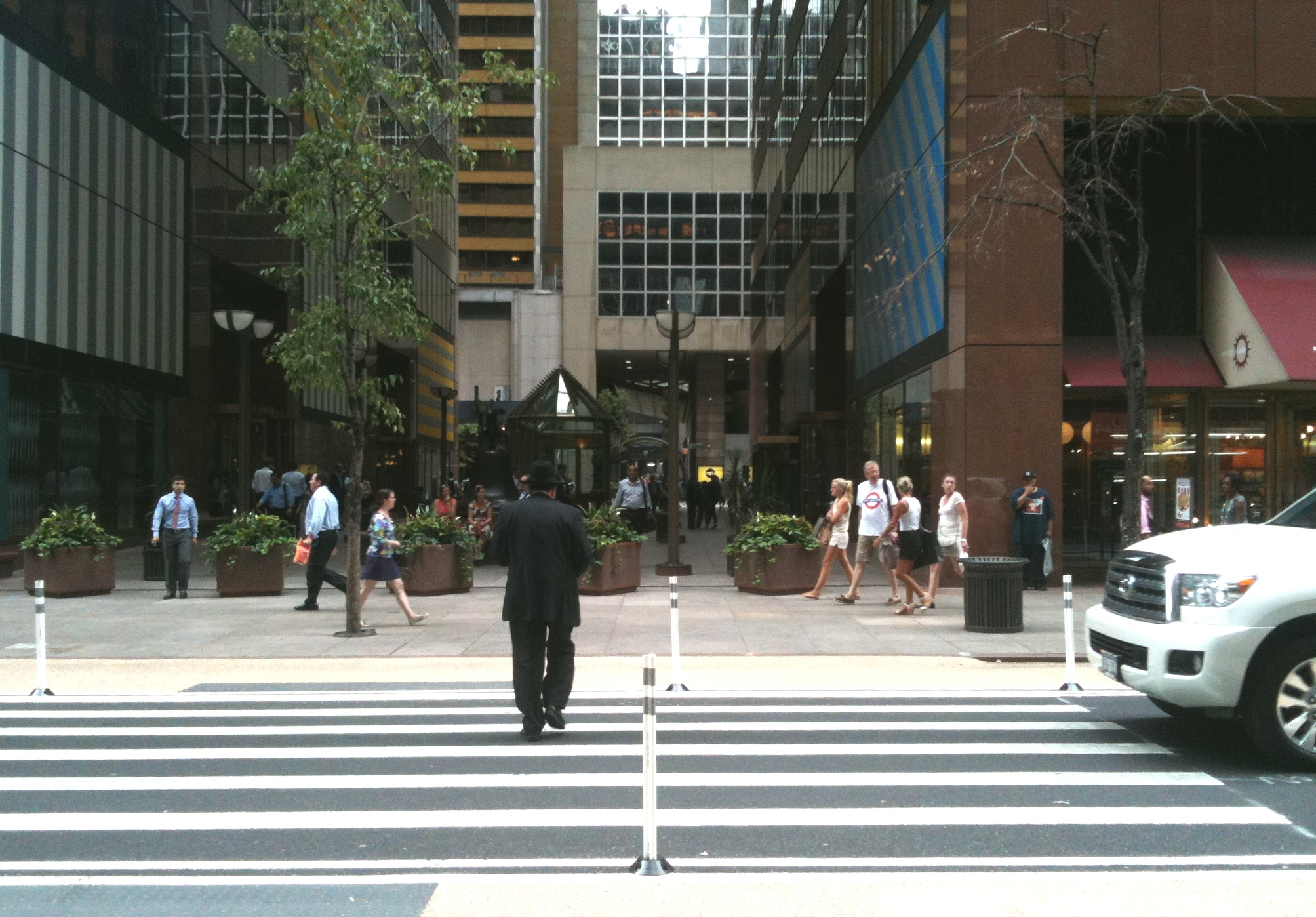
6 1/2 Avenue looking north from 51st Street

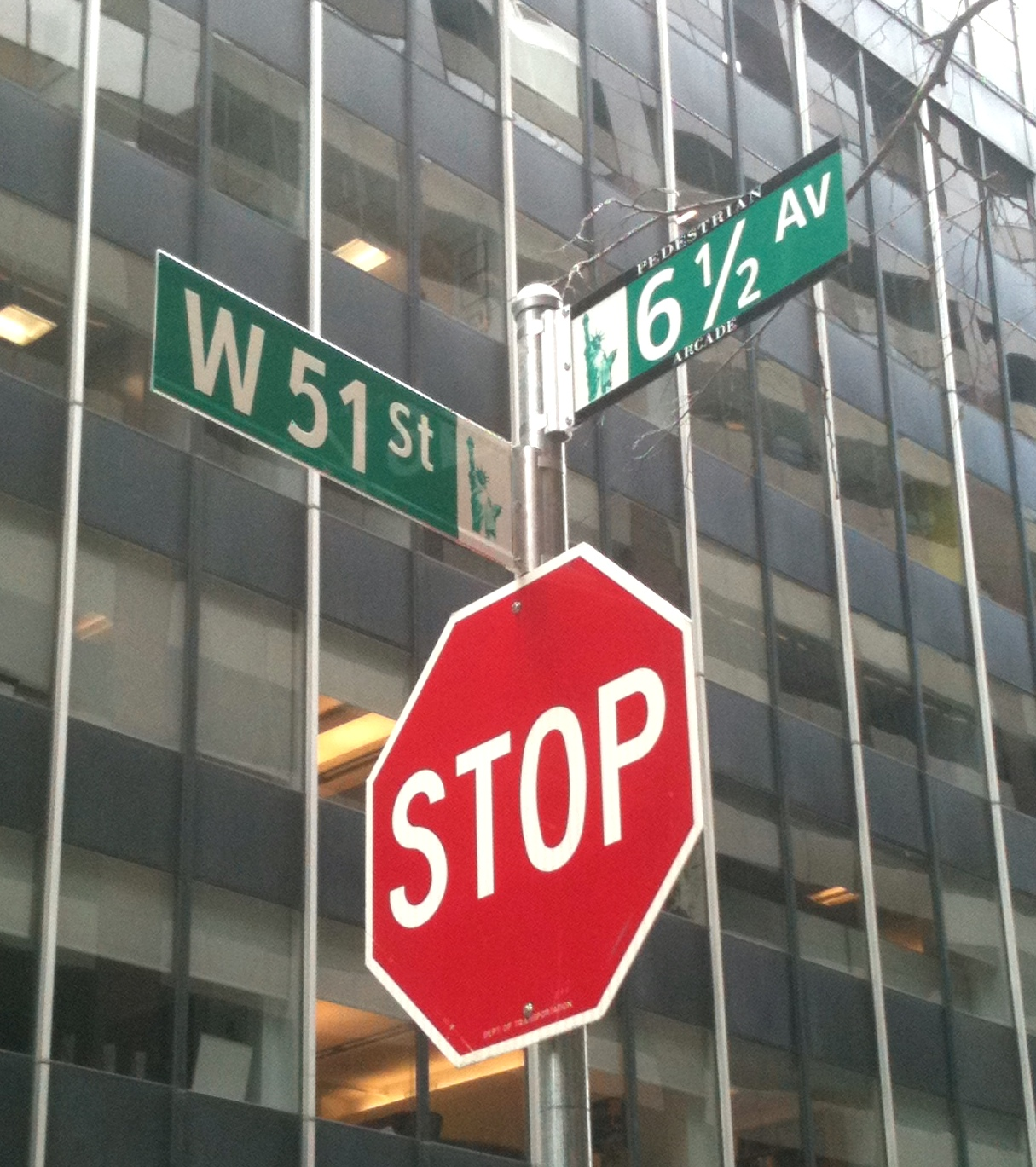
6 1/2 Avenue and West 51st Street in Manhattan

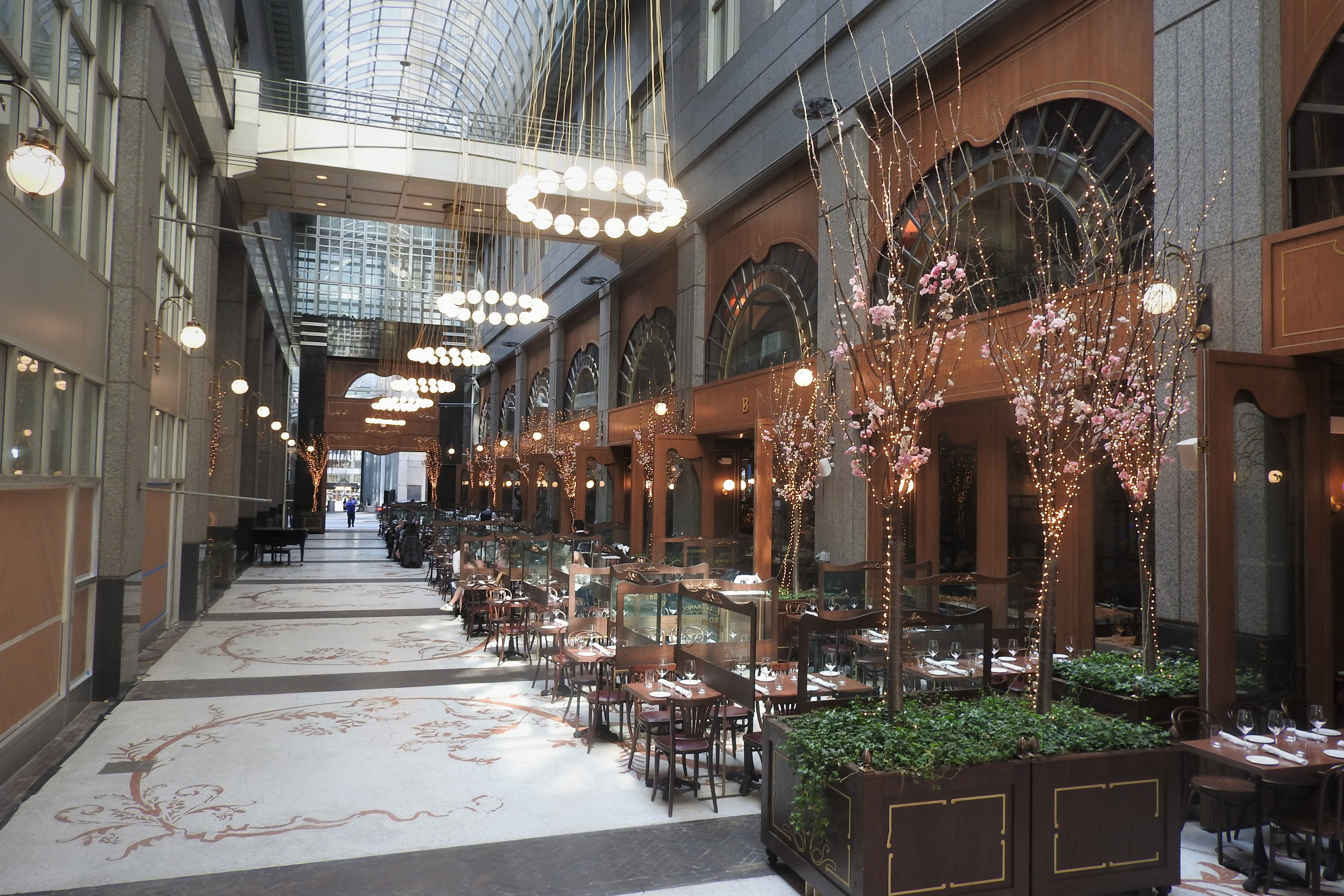
Restaurant using the west half of the avenue

6½ Avenue is a north-south pedestrian passageway in Midtown Manhattan, New York City, running from West 51st to West 57th Streets between Sixth and Seventh Avenues.

The pedestrian-only avenue is a one-quarter mile (400 m) corridor of privately owned public spaces, such as open-access lobbies and canopied space, which are open during the day. There are stop signs and stop ahead signs at six crossings between 51st and 56th Streets. The mid-block crossing at 57th Street is equipped with a traffic light. At the crosswalk areas, there are sidewalk pedestrian ramps with textured surface and flexible delineators to prevent vehicles parking in the areas.

Each intersection along the thoroughfare has a street name sign that reads "6 1/2 AV" and the name of the cross street to officially mark the street name. The mid-block stop signs are unusual for Manhattan, and the fractional avenue name is a new idea for the numbered street system of New York City.

== History ==
In 2011, the Friends of Privately Owned Public Spaces proposed the creation of a six-block pathway from 51st to 57th Streets that would be mid-block between Sixth and Seventh Avenues to ease pedestrian traffic. The proposal called for connecting public spaces in the area, that were not known to most pedestrians, into a pedestrian corridor and naming it Holly Whyte Way. The idea was presented to the Community Board 5 Transportation Committee and the full Community Board 5, then the board sent a formal request to the New York City Department of Transportation (NYCDOT) in May 2011.

In March 2012, NYCDOT announced the plan, with a list of improvements, to construct a new pedestrian-only avenue. The Community Board 5 Transportation Committee unanimously voted in favor of a resolution to support the project as presented by NYCDOT on March 26, 2012. The $60,000 project was completed in July 2012. Initially after the opening of the 6½ Avenue, drivers often failed to obey the avenue's stop signs, which presented a public safety issue at the time.
