= Manhattan address algorithm =

Algorithm for estimating cross-street number

The Manhattan address algorithm is a series of formulas used to estimate the closest east–west cross street for building numbers on north–south avenues in the New York City borough of Manhattan.

== Algorithm ==
To find the approximate number of the closest cross street, divide the building number by a divisor (generally 20) and add (or subtract) the "tricky number" from the table below:

Street/Avenue	Building No.	Divisor	Tricky No.	(unrounded result)
Avenue A	All	$\div 20$	$+3$	
Avenue B	All	$\div 20$	$+3$	
Avenue C	All	$\div 20$	$+3$	
Avenue D	All	$\div 20$	$+3$	
1st Avenue	All	$\div 20$	$+3$	
2nd Avenue	All	$\div 20$	$+3$	
3rd Avenue	All	$\div 20$	$+10$	
4th Avenue	All	$\div 20$	$+8$	
5th Avenue	63–108	$\div 20$	$+11$	14.15–16.4
5th Avenue	109–199	$\div 20$	$+13$	18.45–23
5th Avenue	200–399	$\div 20$	$+16$	26.05–36
5th Avenue	400–599	$\div 20$	$+18$	38.05–48
5th Avenue	600–774	$\div 20$	$+20$	50.05–58.75
5th Avenue	775–1286	$\div 10$	$-18$	59.6–110.6
5th Avenue	1287–1499	$\div 20$	$+45$	110–120
5th Avenue	Above 1500	$\div 20$	$+24$	124+
6th Avenue / Avenue of the Americas	All	$\div 20$	$-12$	
7th Avenue	1–1800	$\div 20$	$+12$	12.05–102
7th Avenue	Above 1800	$\div 20$	$+20$	110+
8th Avenue	All	$\div 20$	$+9$	
9th Avenue	All	$\div 20$	$+13$	
10th Avenue	All	$\div 20$	$+14$	
11th Avenue	All	$\div 20$	$+15$	
Amsterdam Avenue	All	$\div 20$	$+59$	
Audubon Avenue	All	$\div 20$	$+165$	
Columbus Avenue	All	$\div 20$	$+60$	
Broadway	1–754	(few numbered streets south of 8th)		
Broadway	756–846	$\div 20$	$-29$	8.8–13.3
Broadway	847–953	$\div 20$	$-25$	17.35–22.65
Broadway	Above 953	$\div 20$	$-31$	16.65+
Central Park West	All	$\div 10$	$+60$	
Convent Avenue	All	$\div 20$	$+127$	
East End Avenue	All	$\div 20$	$+79$	
Edgecombe Avenue	All	$\div 20$	$+134$	
Ft. Washington Avenue	All	$\div 20$	$+158$	
Lenox Avenue	All	$\div 20$	$+110$	
Lexington Avenue	All	$\div 20$	$+22$	
Madison Avenue	All	$\div 20$	$+27$	
Manhattan Avenue	All	$\div 20$	$+100$	
Park Avenue	All	$\div 20$	$+34$	
Park Avenue South	All	$\div 20$	$+8$	
Pleasant Avenue	All	$\div 20$	$+101$	
Riverside Drive	1–567	$\div 10$	$+72$	72.1–128.7
Riverside Drive	Above 567	$\div 10$	$+78$	134.7+
St. Nicholas Avenue	All	$\div 20$	$+110$	
Vanderbilt Avenue	All	$\div 20$	$+42$	
Wadsworth Avenue	All	$\div 20$	$+173$	
West End Avenue	All	$\div 20$	$+59$	
York Avenue	All	$\div 20$	$+4$	

For the north–south avenues, there are typically 20 address numbers between consecutive east–west streets (10 on either side of the avenue). A standard land lot on each avenue was originally 20 feet (6.1 m) wide, and there is about 200 feet (61 m) between each pair of east–west streets, for ten land lots between each pair of streets. The exceptions are Riverside Drive, as well as Fifth Avenue and Central Park West between 59th and 110th streets, which use a divisor of 10. These avenues all have buildings only on one side of the street, with a park on the other side.

The algorithm as portrayed in a plastic wallet card put out by a bank, which uses the term "key number"

The "tricky number" often corresponds to a street near the southern end of the avenue. There are some notable exceptions:

- York Avenue address numbers are continuations of Avenue A address numbers, since the avenue was originally called Avenue A.
- East End Avenue address numbers are continuations of Avenue B address numbers, since the avenue was originally called Avenue B.
- Sixth Avenue and Broadway start south of Houston Street, the southern boundary of the Manhattan street numbering system.
- Although Park Avenue's southern terminus is at 32nd Street, a homeowner at 34th Street wanted the address "1 Park Avenue" (this was later changed).

=== Examples ===
For example, if you are at 62 Avenue B, $62 \div 20 \approx 3$, then add the "tricky number" $3$ to give $6$. The nearest cross street to 62 Avenue B is East 6th Street.

If you are at 78 Riverside Drive, $78 \div 10 \approx 8$, then add the "tricky number" $72$ to give $80$. The nearest cross street to 78 Riverside Drive is West 80th Street.

If you are at 501 5th Avenue, $501 \div 20 \approx 25$, then add the "tricky number" $18$ to give $43$. The nearest cross street to 501 5th Avenue is actually 42nd Street, not 43rd Street, as the Manhattan address algorithm only gives approximate answers.

== See also ==
- List of numbered streets in Manhattan
- Numbered street
