= List of lettered Brooklyn avenues =

The flat south central portion of the New York City borough of Brooklyn has a set of lettered avenues. Improved public transport brought urban sprawl to this area in the late 19th and early 20th centuries, after the hilly areas to its west and north had already been developed. The avenues are oriented east to west and unless specified have two traffic lanes, carrying two-way traffic. Route descriptions are given west to east.

Much of Brooklyn has only named streets, but in this portion of Brooklyn, lettered avenues (like Avenue M) east of Dahill Road run east and west, forming a perpendicular grid with numbered streets that have the prefix "East". South of Avenue O, related perpendicular numbered streets west of Dahill Road use the "West" designation. This set of numbered streets ranges from West 37th Street to East 108th Street, and the avenues range from A to Z with names substituted for some of them in some neighborhoods, notably Albemarle Road, Beverley Road, Cortelyou Road, Clarendon Road, Dorchester Road, Ditmas Avenue, Foster Avenue, Farragut Road, Glenwood Road and Quentin Road.

== Details ==
=== Avenues A and B ===
These are less than a mile long, in northern Canarsie. In 1897, at the request of developers, the City of Brooklyn renamed several streets in what is now known as Prospect Park South. Among these are Avenues A and B, and five numbered streets which cross them. Avenue A was renamed Albemarle Road, and a portion of Avenue B between Coney Island Avenue and Flatbush Avenue was renamed Beverley Road. Albemarle Road runs from Church Avenue to Nostrand Avenue, with a short disalignment break at Flatbush Avenue.

After Brooklyn was annexed into the City of Greater New York, three more segments of Avenue B, namely between Church Avenue and Coney Island Avenue, between Flatbush Avenue and Brooklyn Avenue, and between Schenectady Avenue and Ralph Avenue, were renamed with an Americanized spelling: Beverly Road. This explains the spelling discrepancy between the two subway stations along what was once known as Avenue B: the Beverley Road station on the BMT Brighton Line, and the Beverly Road station on the IRT Nostrand Avenue line.

The portion of Avenue B east of Ralph Avenue was not given the name in order to complement an Avenue A which is distinct from what is now known as Albemarle Road (though starts at roughly the same latitude, running from Ralph to the corner of East 96th Street and Linden Boulevard). Avenue B runs to East 98th Street, which Avenue A once did as well before Linden Boulevard was extended and the remaining block, cut off, was absorbed into Brookdale University Hospital and Medical Center.

=== Avenue C ===
Avenue C is located in Kensington and is less than a mile long. Cortelyou Road, which is one block south, can be easily confused with Avenue C, since Cortelyou starts with the letter "C". Clarendon Road, which begins one block further south from Cortelyou at Flatbush Avenue and also starts with the letter, is the most likely successor as it begins at roughly the same latitude. Clarendon runs to a short block east of Ralph Avenue where it meets Avenue D, which in turn re-assumes the name Ditmas Avenue.

=== Avenue D ===
Over a mile in length, Avenue D is located in East Flatbush. Ditmas Avenue and Dorchester Road are sometimes associated with Avenue D, since Ditmas and Dorchester start with the letter "D". However, Cortelyou Road is actually the successor to a portion of Avenue D between Dahill Road and Coney Island Avenue. Ditmas Avenue does intersect the western terminus of Avenue D and Flatbush Avenue, at a 135-degree angle. There is some evidence that the current Avenue D was originally named Ditmas Avenue, and renamed to fit the letter grid; the portion that angled off remained Ditmas.

=== Avenue E ===
There is no longer any Avenue E. Late 19th and early 20th century maps depict an Avenue E, which was later renamed Ditmas Avenue (the segment between Dahill Road and Coney Island Avenue) and Foster Avenue (the segments from Foster Avenue to Bank Street, including a small realignment at Kings Highway).

=== Avenue F ===
Located in the southern part of Kensington, Avenue F is less than a mile long. It is commonly associated with nearby Foster Avenue and Farragut Road, since Foster and Farragut begin with the letter "F". However, Foster Avenue predates Avenue F and is possibly the successor to Avenue E.

Although Avenue F currently terminates west of Ocean Parkway, it originally continued a few blocks further east, until East 8th Street at 18th Avenue. Farragut Road is in close alignment with the remnant Avenue F, and may have originally been called Avenue F.

=== Avenue G ===
There is no longer any Avenue G. It was renamed Glenwood Road in the early 20th century.

=== Avenues H and I ===
The Bay Ridge Branch lies between these avenues for most of their length.

Avenue H begins in the west at Ocean Parkway, is interrupted by the BMT Brighton Line at East 16th Street, and again by the Brooklyn College Campus between Campus Road and Nostrand Avenue. It resumes its run through the East 30's, 40's and 50's before its eastern terminus at Paedergat Avenue South just past East 58th Street.

Avenue I begins at Dahill Road in the west, It is interrupted by the BMT Brighton line past East 16th Street, and terminates in the East at Flatlands Avenue and East 58th Street.

=== Avenue J ===
Avenue J travels through the neighborhoods of Midwood and Flatlands. It begins at Dahill Road and runs to Ralph Avenue in Georgetown, just short of Paerdegat Basin. It resumes across the water in Canarsie and runs from East 80th Street to East 108th Street. The house numbers increase from west to east. The road carries 2 lanes of traffic and has a commercial strip between Coney Island Avenue and East 16th Street. The avenue carries the B6 bus in some places. It is also notoriously home for the famous street gang, The J Boys, which existed from roughly 1979 to 1988.

=== Avenue K ===
Avenue K starts off at Ocean Parkway in Midwood. It gets interrupted with a brief concurrency along Flatbush Avenue. It then runs to Bergen Avenue in Bergen Beach, where it is interrupted by Paerdegat Basin. It resumes across the water in Canarsie and runs from East 80th Street to East 108th Street. The house numbers increase from west to east.

=== Avenues L and M ===
Avenue L starts off at its western terminus at East 4th Street in Midwood and continues to Flatbush Avenue in Flatlands. It resumes at East 41st Street and Troy Avenue and continues as a one-way street going from west to east to Ralph Avenue, where it becomes a two-way street again until its eastern terminus at Bergen Avenue in Bergen Beach. Across the Paerdegat Basin, it resumes at East 80th Street in Canarsie and runs to its terminus at East 108th Street. The house numbers increase from west to east. Avenue M starts at Dahill Road in Mapleton. It gets interrupted at Flatlands Avenue, resumes at Flatbush Avenue and is juxtaposed to the south at Ralph Avenue, from which it runs as a two-way street to Bergen Avenue along Paedergat Basin. Across the water, it resumes at East 80th Street in Canarsie and runs to its terminus at East 108th Street. The house numbers increase from west to east. Avenue M is a one-way street westbound from Ralph Avenue to Flatbush Avenue.

=== Avenue N ===
Avenue N begins its western terminus at McDonald Avenue. It continues to Ocean Parkway and becomes a one way street with traffic flowing from west to east. It becomes interrupted when intersecting East 35th Street in Marine Park. Avenue N starts up again from an intersection at Flatbush Avenue, continuing east towards Bergen Beach. In this neighborhood, Avenue N branches off Veterans Avenue, traveling northeast. Avenue N ends at Royce Street in Bergen Beach, continuing as Cove Lane, until intersecting Bergen Avenue, along Paedergat Basin. Across the water in Canarsie, Avenue N resumes at East 80th Street and runs to its terminus at East 108th Street and the East Mill Basin.

=== Avenue O ===
Avenue O has its western terminus at Bay Parkway near West 11th St. in Bensonhurst. It gets interrupted when intersecting 65th Street. It then picks up again at Dahill Road in Mapleton. It becomes a one way street with traffic flowing from east to west, between Coney Island Avenue and Kings Highway (its eastern terminus).

=== Avenue P ===
Avenue P is four lanes wide, with its western terminus at Bay Parkway in Gravesend and its eastern terminus at Flatbush Avenue in Marine Park. It gets interrupted at Kings Highway and again with a short concurrency along Nostrand Avenue.

=== Avenue Q (Quentin Road) ===
The entire Avenue Q was renamed Quentin Road after World War II, in honor of Theodore Roosevelt's youngest son Quentin, who was killed in aerial combat over France in 1918 during the first World War. It stretches from Stillwell Avenue in Gravesend, to the west, to Flatbush Avenue in Marine Park. The street is interrupted by the BMT Sea Beach Line subway tracks at West 8th and West 7th Streets in Gravesend and again by Kings Highway in Midwood from East 13th Street to East 16th Street, then continues perpendicular to the railroad tracks for the BMT Brighton Line tracks. In Marine Park the street has a short concurrency along Nostrand Avenue. It then continues towards its eastern terminus at Flatbush Avenue and East 45th Street. The musical Avenue Q takes place on a rundown street, said to be located in an "outer-outer borough" of New York City; but the creators have stated that their Avenue Q is fictional, and not based on Quentin Road or any other actual street.

=== Avenue R ===
Avenue R begins its western terminus at Kings Highway and East 5th Street in Gravesend. In Gravesend, Avenue R has a median, between East 7th Street and Coney Island Avenue. In Marine Park, the street has a brief concurrency along Gerritsen Avenue. It then continues towards its eastern terminus at Flatbush Avenue and Avenue O in Marine Park.

Avenue R formerly had a segment further west, despite the interruption of Kings Highway at its current western end. That portion, from Stillwell Avenue on the west to West 3rd on the east, was renamed Highlawn Avenue at the request of an early 20th century developer.

=== Avenues S and T ===
These avenues begin their western terminus at Stillwell Avenue in Gravesend and continue past McDonald Avenue, Ocean Parkway, Coney Island Ave, Kelly Park on E 14th Street and Avenue S, Ocean Avenue and Nostrand Avenue until an intersection with Stuart Street in Marine Park. They get interrupted by Marine Park, and then Avenue S continues from East 32nd Street until and Avenue T continues from East 33rd Street. Avenue S has its eastern terminus at Avenue T in the Marine Park section near Kings Plaza Mall. From here, Avenue T resumes until its eastern terminus at Bergen Avenue in Bergen Beach.

=== Avenue U ===
Avenue U is a main thoroughfare throughout its length. Avenue U begins at Stillwell Avenue in Gravesend and ends at Bergen Avenue in Bergen Beach, while serving the other Brooklyn neighborhoods of Homecrest, Sheepshead Bay, Marine Park, and Mill Basin along its route. The B3 bus runs along the entire length of the avenue, except for the one block stretch between Stillwell Avenue and 86th Street.

=== Avenue V ===
Avenue V exists in five segments. The first segment runs from Stillwell Avenue to West 8th Street, where its route is blocked by the BMT Sea Beach Line tracks. It resumes its path opposite the tracks at a dead end west of West 7th Street and runs to Van Sicklen Street. The third segment takes Avenue V from Gravesend Neck Road east of East 1st Street to Burnett Street at Marine Park. Over the course of the third segment, the traffic pattern of Avenue V changes four times.

From Gravesend Neck Road to Ocean Avenue the avenue serves two-way traffic on two lanes; after Ocean Avenue, traffic travels one way westbound on two lanes until Gravesend Neck Road. East of Gravesend Neck Road, traffic travels one way eastbound on two lanes until Nostrand Avenue, where traffic once again resumes its regular pattern, ending at Burnett Street. The fourth segment of Avenue V begins on the other side of Marine Park at East 38th Street and runs until Flatbush Avenue. The final segment begins some distance away in Bergen Beach, just east of a dead end at Mill Basin and terminates at Bergen Avenue.

=== Avenue W ===
Avenue W exists in four segments. The first segment runs from Stillwell Avenue to West 11th Street, where its path is impeded by the Marlboro housing projects. Its second segment runs from West 7th Street to its intersection with Sheepshead Bay Road and Gravesend Neck Road. During the second segment, traffic patterns on the road change four times. From West 7th Street one block east to 86th Street, traffic travels one way on one lane westbound. On the block between 86th Street and West 6th Street traffic travels two ways on two lanes. On the block between West 6th Street and Van Sicklen Street, traffic travels one way on one lane eastbound. Finally, from Van Sicklen Street to the end of its second segment, traffic on Avenue W travels two ways on two lanes. The third segment runs from East 16th Street to Gerritsen Avenue. The fourth segment begins some distance away in Bergen Beach, across several creeks and two neighborhoods. This last stretch runs from a dead end just east of Mill Basin to Bergen Avenue.

Prior to 2001, there was a dead-end piece of Avenue W on E. 15th Street whose three homes were demolished in favor of a multi-family residence.

=== Avenue X ===
Avenue X exists in four segments. The westernmost segment runs from Stillwell Avenue to West 8th Street, where its path is interrupted by the Coney Island Yards. The second segment begins at a dead end at Boynton Place just east of the yards, and is served by a Culver Line station. It continues to another dead end just east of East 15th Street at the BMT Brighton Beach Line. Avenue X once again resumes its course opposite the train tracks at East 16th Street and ends at Knapp Street. The easternmost segment begins some distance away in Bergen Beach, across several creeks and two neighborhoods, at East 69th Street, to Bergen Avenue.

=== Avenue Y ===
Avenue Y exists in three segments. The first segment is a very short segment between Bay 50th Street and West 16th Street in Gravesend. The second segment runs from Shell Road to Knapp Street. The third segment begins some distance away in Bergen Beach, across several creeks and two neighborhoods. This last stretch runs from a dead end just east of Mill Basin to Bergen Avenue.

=== Avenue Z ===
Avenue Z exists in two segments. The first segment runs from Cropsey Avenue to West 13th Street, blocked by the Coney Island Yards. The second segment runs from Shell Road to Coyle Street.

== See also ==
- List of numbered Brooklyn streets
- List of Brooklyn thoroughfares
