= List of memorials to Anthony Wayne =

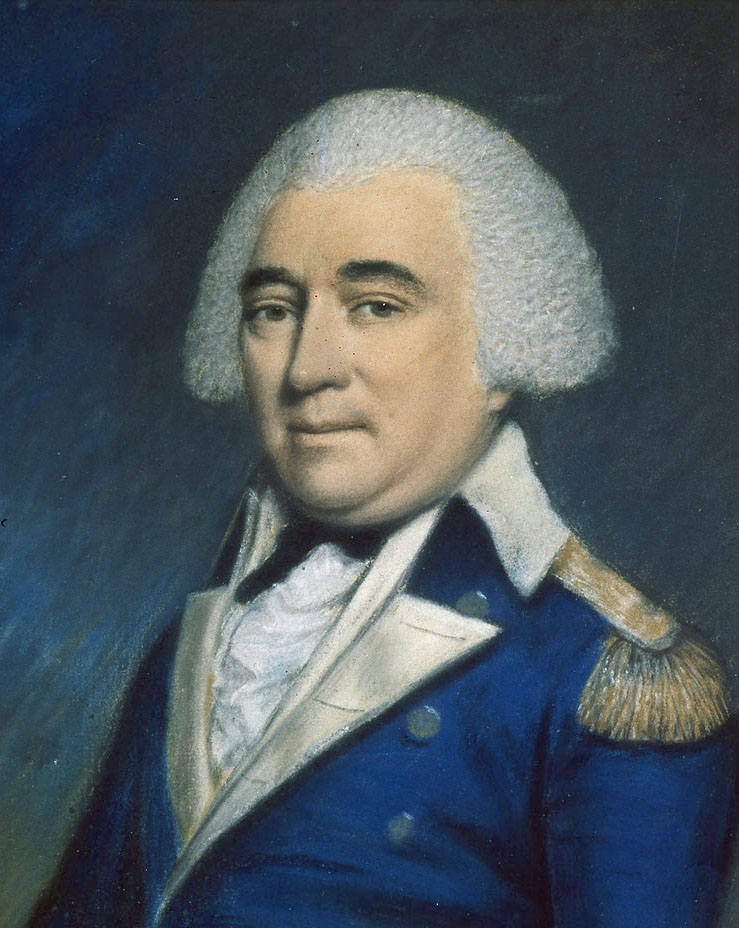
Major-General Anthony Wayne (Pastel by James Sharples, Sr ca. 1795)

This is a list of places and things named for Anthony Wayne, a general in the U.S. Army and a Founding Father of the United States.

== Boroughs ==
- Waynesboro, Pennsylvania
- Waynesburg, Pennsylvania

== Cities ==
- Fort Wayne, Indiana
- Wayne, Michigan
- Wayne, Nebraska
- Waynesboro, Georgia
- Waynesboro, Mississippi
- Waynesboro, Tennessee
- Waynesboro, Virginia
- Waynesville, Missouri

== Communities ==
- Wayne, Pennsylvania
- Waynedale, Fort Wayne, Indiana
- Waynewood, Alexandria, Virginia

== Counties ==
- Wayne County, Georgia
- Wayne County, Illinois
- Wayne County, Indiana
- Wayne County, Iowa
- Wayne County, Kentucky
- Wayne County, Michigan
- Wayne County, Mississippi
- Wayne County, Missouri
- Wayne County, Nebraska
- Wayne County, New York
- Wayne County, North Carolina
- Wayne County, Ohio
- Wayne County, Pennsylvania
- Wayne County, Tennessee
- Wayne County, West Virginia
- Wayne County, Utah

== Forests and parks ==
- Wayne National Forest in Ohio
- Anthony Wayne Recreation Area, part of Harriman State Park, in New York State
- Wayne Square, in Tallahassee, Florida – present location of City Hall and one of 5 public squares established in the city's original plan
- Wayne Park in Beaver, Pennsylvania
- General Wayne Park Merion, Pennsylvania

== Towns ==
- Wayne, Maine
- Wayne, New Jersey
- Wayne, New York
- Waynesville, North Carolina
- Wayne, Oklahoma
- Wayne, Pennsylvania
- Wayne, West Virginia
- South Wayne, Wisconsin
- Waynesville, Georgia

== Townships ==
- Wayne Township, Ohio
- Wayne Township, Illinois
- Wayne Township, Allen County, Indiana
- Wayne Township, Marion County, Indiana
- The former Wayne Township, Montgomery County, Ohio (now the city of Huber Heights)
- Wayne Township, New Jersey
- Wayne Township, Lawrence County, Pennsylvania
- the former Mad River Township and Mad River Township Local School District (now Riverside, Ohio)

== Villages ==
- Wayne, Illinois
- Wayne, Ohio
- Waynesburg, Ohio
- Waynesfield, Ohio
- Waynesville, Illinois
- Waynesville, Ohio
- Wayne City, Illinois
- Waynesburg, Ohio

== Schools and Colleges ==
- Anthony Wayne School in Philadelphia, Pennsylvania
- Anthony Wayne Elementary School in Defiance, Ohio
- Anthony Wayne Elementary School in Franklin, Ohio
- Wayne Trace High School in Paulding, Ohio
- Anthony Wayne Middle School in Wayne, New Jersey
- Anthony Wayne High School in Whitehouse, Ohio
- Anthony Wayne Local School District, Ohio, whose sports teams are known as the "Fighting Generals"
- General Wayne Elementary School, in Malvern, Pennsylvania
- Wayne Central High School in Ontario, New York
- Wayne County High School, in Monticello, Kentucky
- Wayne Community School District in Corydon, Iowa
- Wayne County Community College in Detroit, Michigan
- Wayne Elementary School in Erie, Pennsylvania
- Wayne High School in Huber Heights, Ohio
- Wayne High School in, Fort Wayne, Indiana
- Wayne State College in Wayne, Nebraska
- Wayne State University in, Detroit
- Waynesboro Area Senior High School in, Waynesboro, Pennsylvania
- Waynesboro High School in Waynesboro, Virginia
- Waynesburg University in Waynesburg, Pennsylvania
- Waynesfield-Goshen Schools in, Waynesfield, Ohio
- Anthony Wayne Elementary School in Detroit, Michigan
- Wayne Trail Elementary School in Maumee, Ohio
- Anthony Wayne High School in Whitehouse, Ohio
- Anthony Wayne Elementary School in Ambridge, Pennsylvania
- Wayne County High School (Waynesboro, Mississippi)
- Wayne Memorial High School, Wayne, Michigan
- Wayne High School, Wayne, West Virginia
- Wayne Middle School, Wayne, West Virginia
- Wayne Elementary School, Wayne, West Virginia

== Streets and highways ==
- Anthony Street, Celina, Ohio
- Anthony Boulevard, Fort Wayne, Indiana
- Anthony Wayne Avenue, Cincinnati, Ohio
- Anthony Wayne Drive, Detroit, Michigan
- Anthony Wayne Drive, Baden, Pennsylvania
- Anthony Wayne Drive, Chesterbrook, Pennsylvania
- Anthony Wayne Drive, Warminster, Pennsylvania
- Anthony Wayne Trail, Toledo, Ohio
- Anthwyn Road, Merion, Pennsylvania (across from the inn)
- Mad Anthony Street, Cincinnati, Ohio
- Mad Anthony Street, Millersburg, Ohio
- Mad River Road, Hillsboro, Ohio
- North Wayne Avenue, Lockland, Ohio
- North Wayne Street, West Chester, Pennsylvania
- South Wayne Avenue, Fort Wayne, Indiana
- South Wayne Avenue, Lockland, Ohio
- South Wayne Avenue, Waynesboro, Virginia
- South Wayne Street, West Chester, Pennsylvania
- Southwest Anthony Wayne Drive, Fort Wayne, Indiana
- Wayne Avenue, Ticonderoga, New York
- Wayne Avenue, Bronx, New York
- Wayne Avenue, Chambersburg, Pennsylvania
- Wayne Avenue, Collingdale, Pennsylvania
- Wayne Avenue, Chicago, Illinois
- Wayne Avenue, Dayton, Ohio
- Wayne Avenue (Rte 112), Stony Point, New York
- Wayne Avenue, Philadelphia, Pennsylvania
- Wayne Avenue, Greenville, Ohio
- Wayne Road, running through (from north to south) the municipalities of; Livonia, Westland, Wayne, and Romulus, Michigan
- Wayne Street, Celina, Ohio
- Wayne Street, Fort Recovery, Ohio
- Wayne Street, Fort Wayne, Indiana
- Wayne Street, Toledo, Ohio
- Wayne Street, Erie, Pennsylvania
- Wayne Street North, South Bend, Indiana
- Wayne Street South, South Bend, Indiana
- Wayne Trace, Fort Wayne, Indiana
- Wayne Trace Road, running from Eaton in Preble County, Ohio, to just outside of Seven Mile in Butler County, Ohio

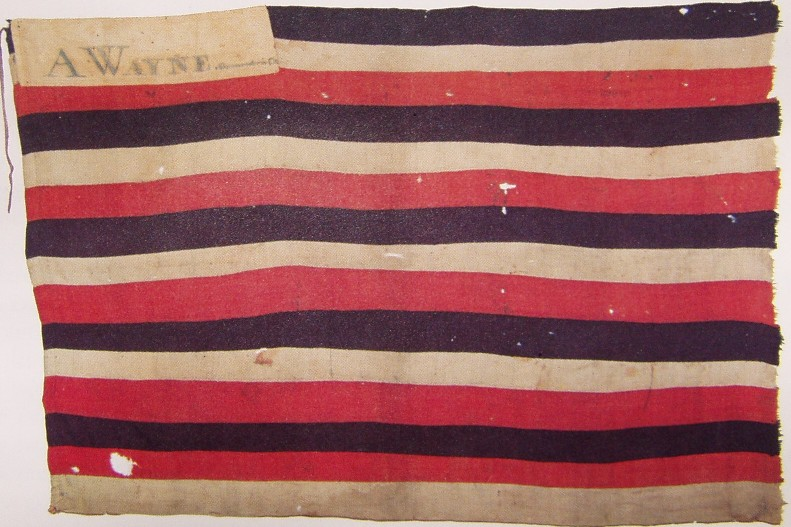
This flag, presented to Miami chief She-Moc-E-Nish at the Treaty of Greenville, is signed "A.Wayne commander in chief". It is currently owned by the State of Indiana.

== Structures and businesses ==
- The former Anthony Wayne Bank in Fort Wayne
- Former Anthony Wayne Drive-In Movie, Wayne Township, New Jersey
- Anthony Wayne Barber Shop in Maumee, Ohio
- Anthony Wayne, a campsite at Woodland Trails Scout Reservation in Camden, Ohio
- The Anthony Wayne Movie Theater in Wayne, Pennsylvania
- Anthony Wayne Recreation Area in Harriman State Park, New York
- AWS, formerly Anthony Wayne Rehabilitation Center for the Handicapped and Blind, Inc. in Fort Wayne, Indiana
- Anthony Wayne Suspension Bridge near downtown Toledo, Ohio
- Anthony Wayne Terrace Housing Association Baden, Pennsylvania
- Mad Anthony Brewing Company, in Fort Wayne, Indiana
- Fort Wayne in Fort Wayne, Indiana
- Fort Wayne in Detroit, Michigan
- The Fort Wayne Mad Ants basketball team of the NBA G League
- General Wayne Inn in Merion, Pennsylvania
- "Mad Anthony's", a local pub in Waterville, Ohio
- Wayne Corporation, defunct school bus manufacturer, originally Wayne Agricultural Works, then Wayne Works
- Wayne Hospital in Greenville, Ohio
- Anthony Wayne Hotel in Akron, Ohio, demolished in 1996
- Anthony Wayne Motel in Yellow Springs, Ohio on US Route 68
- General Wayne Inn, Honey Brook, Pennsylvania on US Route 322
- Anthony Wayne Hotel in downtown Hamilton, Ohio renovated into the Anthony Wayne Apartments
- Hotel Wayne and restaurant in Honesdale, Pennsylvania
- Mad Anthony's Bottle Shop & Beer Garden in Waynesville, NC
- Wayne Oil Inc. in Fort Recovery, Ohio
- Wayne Hose Company No. 1 of the Stony Point, New York fire department

== In transportation ==
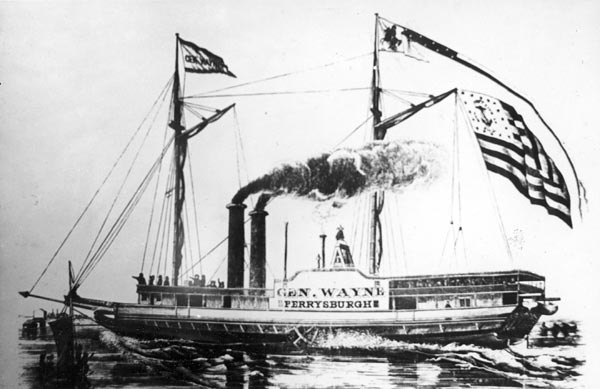
The Anthony Wayne side-wheel passenger and cargo steamship

- The Gen. "Mad" Anthony Wayne, a side-wheel steamboat, sank in April 1850 in Lake Erie while en route from the Toledo, Ohio, area to Buffalo, New York. Out of 93 passengers and crew on board, 38 died. On June 21, 2007, it was announced that the wreck had been discovered by Thomas Kowalczk, an amateur shipwreck hunter.
- Major General Anthony Wayne, U.S. Army tugboat based at Southampton, UK.

== In literature and publications ==
- Wayne is mentioned in Donald Barthelme's novel, The King.
- Contrary to the popular belief that Bruce Wayne (the real name of the superhero character Batman) was named after John Wayne, comic book writer Bill Finger named Batman's alter ego after Robert the Bruce and Anthony Wayne. In DC Comics, Bruce Wayne is depicted as General Anthony Wayne's direct descendant, and on one occasion Bruce Wayne, as Batman, traveled back in time and met Anthony Wayne. Furthermore, the property on which Wayne Manor is built was given to General Wayne for his service during the Revolution. Rumors that Bruce's middle name is "Anthony" have yet to be confirmed by DC Comics.
- In F. Scott Fitzgerald's Tender Is the Night (1934), Dick Diver mentions his descent from Mad Anthony Wayne.
- Anthony Wayne is one of the main characters in Ann Rinaldi's historical novel, A Ride into Morning.
- Mad Anthony Wayne is a character in Diana Gabaldon's Outlander series. He features in An Echo in the Bone and Written in My Own Heart's Blood.

== In products ==
- Mad Anthony Ale (Mad Anthony's APA), an American Pale Ale (APA) brewed by the Erie Brewing Company in Erie, Pennsylvania.

== Onscreen ==
- Actor Marion Morrison was initially given the stage name of Anthony Wayne, after the general, by Fox Studio head Winfield Sheenan and Raoul Walsh, who directed The Big Trail (1930), but Fox Studios changed it to John Wayne instead, saying "Anthony" sounded "too Italian".
- In "Guy Walks Into a Psychiatrist's Office...", the Season Two premiere of The Sopranos, the character Dr. Jennifer Melfi is shown seeing patients at the "Anthony Wayne Motel" in Wayne, New Jersey, while on the lam, in fear for her life.
- The 1971 made-for-TV movie Assault on the Wayne, starring Leonard Nimoy, takes place on board the submarine U.S.S. Anthony Wayne.
- In Boardwalk Empire, S3E09, antagonist Gyp Rosetti admires a glass encased colonial hat from, as he says, "Mad Anthony Wayne". Rosetti later steals this hat at the end of the episode and wears it as he watches over his illegal alcohol business.

== In sculpture ==
- General Anthony Wayne relief, by James Edward Kelly in Tryon, North Carolina, 1896
- The Wayne County Building in Detroit, Michigan, features a pediment by Edward Wagner that depicts an equestrian Wayne, c. 1900
- Equestrian statue by Henry Kirke Bush-Brown at Valley Forge, 1908
- Anthony Wayne Monument by George Etienne Ganiere, Fort Wayne, Indiana, 1918
- Battle of Fallen Timbers Monument also known as the Anthony Wayne Monument, by Bruce Saville, Maumee, Ohio, 1929
- Equestrian statue by John Gregory, Philadelphia, Pennsylvania, 1937
