= List of numbered Brooklyn streets =

This article covers the non-directionally labeled numbered east–west streets in the New York City borough of Brooklyn between and including 1st Street and 101st Street. Most are offset by about 40 degrees from true east–west, that is they run southeast–northwest, but by local convention they are called east–west.

With avenues numbered from 1 to 28, they form a street grid. While similar to Manhattan's grid, this Brooklyn grid does not have strict rules of traffic direction based on whether a street number is odd or even. This grid starts with 1st Street in Park Slope south of Garfield Place and ends with 101st Street just north of Shore Road and the Belt Parkway in Bay Ridge.

A separate grid of "West" and "East" streets (West 1st through West 37th Streets, and East 1st through East 108th Streets) lies on both sides of Dahill Road and run approximately north–south. A third grid on Bath Beach neighborhood specifies "Bay Streets" (facing Gravesend Bay), numbered from Bay 7th to Bay 50th Streets, with the first three streets having been taken over by Dyker Beach Park, and alternating with the numbered avenues from Bensonhurst and New Utrecht. A fourth grid of "North and "South" streets lie north and south of Grand Street, Williamsburg, running approximately east-west.

== Streets ==
=== Main grid (Carroll Gardens to Bay Ridge) ===
| Street | West | East | Length | # of lanes | Traffic direction | Additional notes | Image |
|---|---|---|---|---|---|---|---|
| 1st Street | Hoyt Street | Prospect Park West | | 1 | East | Exists in two segments, cut off by the Gowanus Canal. | |
| 2nd Street | Smith Street | Prospect Park West | | 1 | West | Exists in two segments, cut off by the Gowanus Canal. | |
| 3rd Street | Smith Street | Prospect Park West | | 1-2 | Varies | Runs two-way from Smith Street to 4th Avenue and one-way eastbound to end. | |
| 4th Street | Smith Street | Prospect Park West | | 1 | West | Exists in two segments, cut off by the Gowanus Canal. | |
| 5th Street | Smith Street | Prospect Park West | | 1 | East | Exists in two segments, cut off by the Gowanus Canal. | |
| 6th Street | 2nd Avenue | Prospect Park West | | 1 | West | | |
| 7th Street | 2nd Avenue | Prospect Park West | | 1 | East | | |
| 8th Street | 2nd Avenue | Prospect Park West | | 1 | West | | |
| 9th Street | Smith Street | Prospect Park West | | 2 | Bidirectional | 4th Avenue/9th Street and other IND Culver Line stations in Park Slope. | |
| 10th Street | Dead-end at 2nd Avenue | Prospect Park West | | 1 | East | | |
| 11th Street | 2nd Avenue | Prospect Park West | | 1 | West | | |
| 12th Street | Dead-end at Hamilton Place | Prospect Park West | | 1 | East | | |
| 13th Street | Hamilton Place | Prospect Park West | | 1 | West | | |
| 14th Street | Hamilton Place | Prospect Park West | | 1 | East | | |
| 15th Street | Hamilton Avenue | Bartel Pritchard Square at Prospect Park West | | 1 | West | | |
| 16th Street | Hamilton Avenue | Prospect Park Southwest | | 1 | Varies | West of 4th Avenue, traffic flows west; east of 4th Avenue, traffic flows east. | |
| 17th Street | Sunset Industrial Park | Terrace Place | | 1 | East | Cut-off, half a block northwest of 6th Avenue, by the Prospect Expressway. | |
| 18th Street | Sunset Industrial Park | Vanderbilt Street | | 1 | West | Interrupted by the Prospect Expressway between 6th and 7th Avenues. | |
| 19th Street | Sunset Industrial Park | Vanderbilt Street | | 1 | East | | |
| 20th Street | Sunset Industrial Park | Vanderbilt Street | | 1-2 | Varies | Bi-directional between Sunset Industrial Park and 3rd Avenue. Protected bike lane between 4th and 10th Avenues. | |
| 21st Street | Dead-end at 3rd Avenue | 7th Avenue | | 1 | East | | |
| 22nd Street | Dead-end at 3rd Avenue | 7th Avenue | | 1 | West | | |
| 23rd Street | Dead-end at 3rd Avenue | 7th Avenue | | 1 | East | | |
| 24th Street | 3rd Avenue | 6th Avenue | | 1 | West | | |
| 25th Street | Dead-end at 3rd Avenue | 5th Avenue | | 1 | East | The 25th Street Station is located on 4th Avenue. | |
| 26th Street | Dead-end at 3rd Avenue | 5th Avenue | | 1 | West | | |
| 27th Street | Dead-end at 3rd Avenue | 5th Avenue | | 1 | East | | |
| 28th Street | 3rd Avenue | 5th Avenue | | 1 | West | | |
| 29th Street | 2nd Avenue | 5th Avenue | | 1 | East | Street closed indefinitely between 2nd and 3rd Avenues for use by the Metropolitan Detention Center. | |
| 30th Street | 2nd Avenue | 5th Avenue | | 1 | West | Street is closed indefinitely between 2nd and 3rd Avenues for use by the Metropolitan Detention Center. | |
| 31st Street | 2nd Avenue | 5th Avenue | | 1 | East | The street is closed between 2nd and 3rd Avenues. | |
| 32nd Street | 2nd Avenue | 5th Avenue | | 1 | West | | |
| 33rd Street | 2nd Street | 5th Avenue | | 1 | East | | |
| 34th Street | 2nd Avenue | 5th Avenue | | 1 | West | | |
| 35th Street | 2nd Avenue | Dahill Road | | 1 | East | Cut-off from 4th Avenue until Church Avenue because of Green-Wood Cemetery. | |
| 36th Street | 2nd Avenue | 15th Avenue | | 1-2 | Varies | Westbound from 2nd Avenue to 5th Avenue becoming two-way to 7th Avenue. Cut-off by cemetery, resumes westbound at Fort Hamilton Parkway. 36th Street Station is on 4th Avenue. | |
| 37th Street | 2nd Avenue | Dahill Road | | 1-2 | Varies | One-way eastbound from 2nd Avenue to 5th Avenue, cut-off by the Jackie Gleason Bus Depot, resumes path at 7th Avenue becoming two-way until Fort Hamilton Parkway where it reverts to an eastbound one way. | |
| 38th Street | 3rd Avenue | Dahill Road | | 1 | Varies | Eastbound from 3rd to 5th Avenues. Westbound from 10th Avenue on. | |
| 39th Street | Dead-end at 1st Avenue | Dahill Road | | 2 | Bidirectional | Important thoroughfare and truck route. The B35 bus route runs along the street from 1st to 14th Avenues and the B70 bus route from 1st to 3rd Avenues and from 4th to 8th Avenues. | |
| 40th Street | 1st Avenue | Dahill Road | | 1 | East | Cut-off between 1st and 2nd Avenues. | |
| 41st Street | 1st Avenue | Dahill Road | | 1 | West | | |
| 42nd Street | Dead-end at 1st Avenue | Dahill Road | | 1 | East | Cut-off by Sunset Park between 5th and 7th Avenues. | |
| 43rd Street | Dead-end at 1st Avenue | Dahill Road | | 1 | West | Cut-off by Sunset Park between 5th and 7th Avenues. | |
| 44th Street | 1st Avenue | Dahill Road | | 1 | East | | |
| 45th Street | 2nd Avenue | 18th Avenue | | 1 | West | The 45th Street Station is located on 4th Avenue. | |
| 46th Street | 2nd Avenue | 18th Avenue | | 1 | East | | |
| 47th Street | 1st Avenue | McDonald Avenue | | 1 | West | | |
| 48th Street | 1st Avenue | 19th Avenue | | 1 | East | | |
| 49th Street/ Sunset Terrace | 2nd Avenue | Dead-end at 18th Avenue | | 1 | West | Carries a portion of the westbound B11 bus route between 4th and 18th Avenues. | |
| 50th Street | 1st Avenue | Dahill Road | | 1 | East | Carries a portion of the eastbound B11 bus route between 4th and 20th Avenues. The 50th Street subway station is located on New Utrecht Avenue. | |
| 51st Street | Dead-end at 1st Avenue | Dahill Road | | 1 | West | Cut-off between 18th and 19th Avenues by the Bay Ridge Branch of the Long Island Rail Road. | |
| 52nd Street | Dead-end at 1st Avenue | Dahill Road | | 1 | East | Carries a portion of the eastbound B11 bus route between 2nd and 4th Avenues. | |
| 53rd Street | 1st Avenue | Dahill Road & 21st Avenue | | 1 | West | The 53rd Street Station is located on 4th Avenue. | |
| 54th Street | 1st Avenue | 20th Avenue | | 1 | East | Cut-off by the Bay Ridge Branch of the Long Island Rail Road between 17th and 18th Avenues. | |
| 55th Street | 1st Avenue | 19th Avenue | 2 miles | 1 | West | Cut-off by the Bay Ridge Branch of the Long Island Rail Road between 17th and 18th Avenues. Carries a portion of the westbound B11 bus route between 1st and 4th Avenues. | |
| 56th Street | 1st Avenue | 18th Avenue | | 1 | East | | |
| 57th Street | 1st Avenue | Dead-end at 21st Avenue | | 1 | West | Cut-off by the Bay Ridge Branch of the Long Island Rail Road between 16th and 17th Avenues and Gravesend Park and Washington Cemetery between 18th and 20th Avenues. | |
| 58th Street | Dead-end at 1st Avenue | Dead-end at 21st Avenue | | 1 | East | Cut-off by the Bay Ridge Branch of the LIRR between 16th and 17th Avenues and by FDR High School between 19th and 20th Avenues. Carries a portion of the eastbound B11 bus route from 1st to 2nd Avenues. | |
| 59th Street | 2nd Avenue | Dahill Road | 3.12 miles | 1 | West | The 59th Street Station is located on 4th Avenue. | |
| 60th Street | 2nd Avenue | McDonald Avenue & 24th Avenue | 3.27 miles | 2 | Bidirectional | Important thoroughfare and truck route. The B9 bus route runs along the street from 4th to McDonald Avenues. | |
| 61st Street | 2nd Avenue | Dahill Road | | 1 | West | | |
| 62nd Street | 2nd Avenue | Dahill Road | | 1 | East | Cut-off between 7th and 8th Avenues by the BMT Sea Beach Line of the New York City Subway and the LIRR's Bay Ridge Branch. The New Utrecht Avenue/62nd Street subway station complex is located at New Utrecht Avenue. | |
| 63rd Street | 2nd Avenue | Dahill Road | | 1 | West | Cut-off between 6th and 8th Avenues by the BMT Sea Beach Line and LIRR Bay Ridge Branch. | |
| 64th Street | 2nd Avenue | Dahill Road | | 1 | East | Cut-off between 6th and 7th Avenues by the BMT Sea Beach Line and LIRR Bay Ridge Branch. | |
| 65th Street | 2nd Avenue | McDonald Avenue at Avenue P | | 1-4 | Varies | Runs westbound, one-way on a single lane between 2nd and 3rd Avenues and eastbound, one-way on a single lane between 5th and 6th Avenues and becomes a two-way, four-lane street from 6th Avenue to its terminus. | |
| 66th Street | 4th Avenue | Bay Parkway | | 1 | West | Cut-off between 6th and 7th Avenues by the Gowanus Expressway. | |
| 67th Street | Colonial Road | Bay Parkway | | 1-2 | Varies | Westbound, one-way on a single lane between Colonial Road and 4th Avenue. Eastbound, one-way on a single lane from 4th to 5th Avenues where the street then runs two-way on two lanes from 5th to 7th Avenues where it is cut-off by the Gowanus Expressway. Beyond the expressway, 67th Street again runs eastbound, one-way on a single lane to its terminus. | |
| 68th Street | Shore Road | Bay Parkway | | 1 | West | Cut-off at 7th Avenue by the Gowanus Expressway. | |
| 69th Street/ Bay Ridge Avenue | Shore Road | Bay Parkway | | 1-2 | Varies | Two-way on two lanes from Shore Road to 6th Avenue, running eastbound, one-way on one lane from 6th Avenue to 7th Avenue where it is cut-off by the Gowanus Expressway. Resumes two-way configuration on the other side of 7th Avenue to 13th Avenue where it reverts to an eastbound, one-way configuration until its terminus. | |
| 70th Street | Dead-end at Narrows Avenue | Bay Parkway | | 1 | Varies | Runs westbound from Narrows Avenue to 7th Avenue where it is interrupted by the Gowanus Expressway. Runs eastbound from other side of 7th Avenue to terminus. | |
| 71st Street | Shore Road | Bay Parkway | | 1 | Varies | Runs westbound from Shore Road to 3rd Avenue where it is interrupted until 6th Avenue where it runs eastbound one block to 7th Avenue where it is again interrupted, this time by the Gowanus Expressway. Runs eastbound from other side of 7th Avenue to terminus. | |
| 86th Street | Shore Road | McDonald Avenue | | 2-4 | Bidirectional | BMT West End Line runs above it from 18th to 25th Avenues. BMT Sea Beach Line has a station near West Eighth Street. BMT Fourth Avenue Line has a station at Fourth Avenue. Buses: B1 from Fourth to McDonald Avenues, B4 from Stillwell to McDonald Avenues, B16 from Shore Road to Seventh Avenue, and X28/38 from Seventh to 14th Avenues. | |
| 87th Street | Shore Road | 5th Avenue | | 1 | West | | |
| 88th Street | Shore Road | 7th Avenue | | 1 | East | | |
| 89th Street | Narrows Avenue | 5th Avenue | | 1 | West | Path interrupted between Gaitling Place and Dahlgren Place by the Gowanus Expressway. | |
| 90th Street | Ridge Boulevard | 7th Avenue | | 1 | West | Path interrupted between Gaitling Place and Dahlgren Place by the Gowanus Expressway. | |
| 91st Street | Shore Road | 5th Avenue | | 1 | East | | |
| 92nd Street | Shore Road | 7th Avenue | | 1-2 | Varies | Runs westbound, one-way on one lane from Shore Road to 4th Avenue where it becomes two-way to its terminus. | |
| 93rd Street | Shore Road | 4th Avenue | | 1 | Varies | Runs westbound from Shore Road to Marine Avenue and eastbound from Marine Avenue to 4th Avenue. | |
| 94th Street | Shore Road | Fort Hamilton Parkway | | 1 | Varies | Runs eastbound from Shore Road to Marine Avenue and westbound from Marine Avenue to Fort Hamilton Parkway. | |
| 95th Street | Shore Road | Fort Hamilton Parkway | | 1 | East | | |
| 96th Street | Shore Road | 4th Avenue | | 1 | West | | |
| 97th Street | Shore Road | Fort Hamilton Parkway | | 1 | Varies | Runs eastbound from Shore Road to 3rd Avenue and westbound from 4th Avenue to Fort Hamilton Parkway. | |
| 98th Street | Dead-end at Marine Avenue | Marine Avenue | | 1 | Two-way | | |
| 99th Street | Shore Road | Fort Hamilton Parkway | | 1 | Varies | Runs eastbound from Shore Road to 3rd Avenue and westbound from 3rd Avenue to terminus. | |
| 100th Street | 3rd Avenue | Fort Hamilton Parkway | | 1 | East | | |
| 101st Street | 3rd Avenue | Fort Hamilton Parkway | | 1 | West | | |

== See also ==
- List of Brooklyn thoroughfares
- List of lettered Brooklyn avenues
