= Saginaw, Texas =

- City
- City of Saginaw
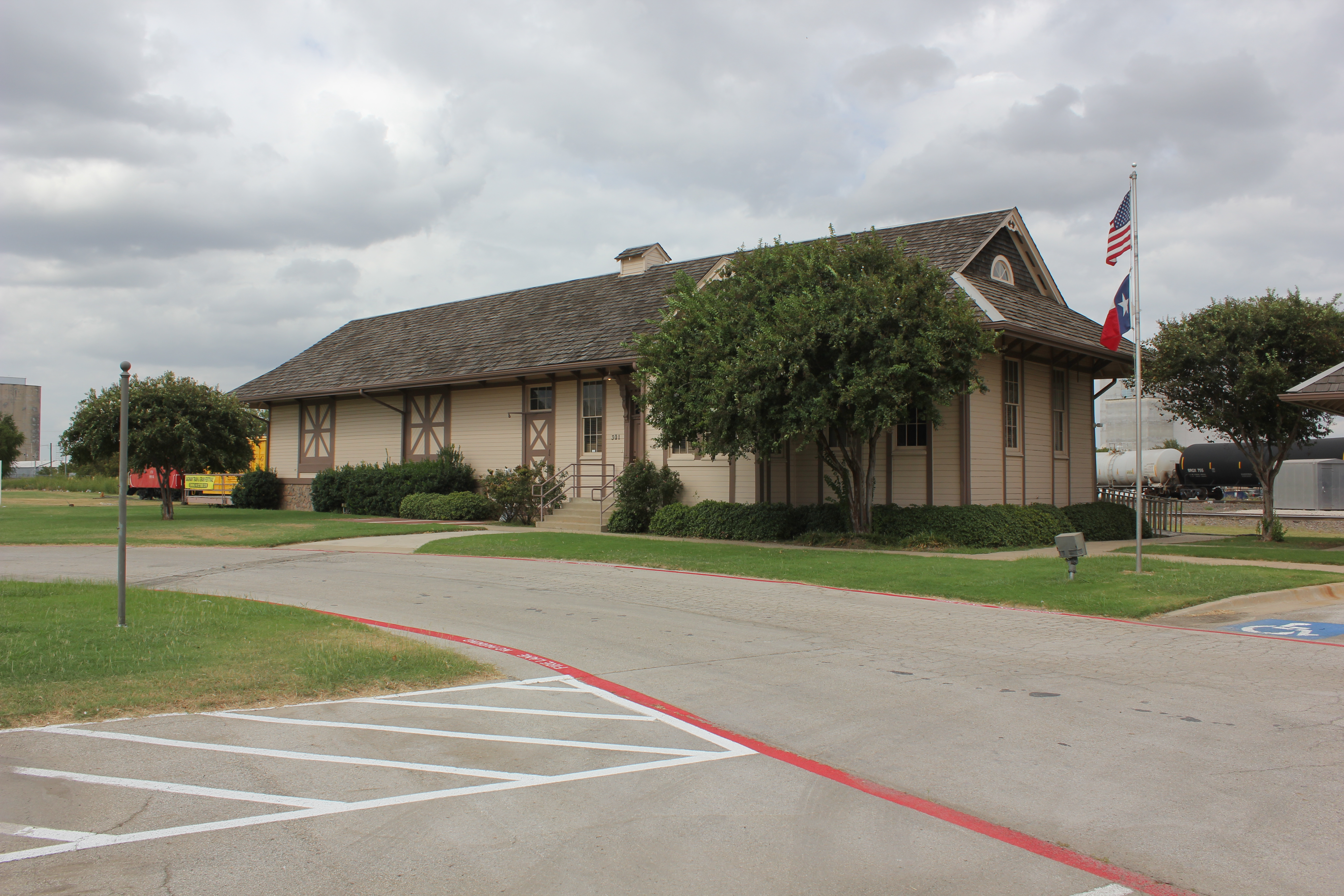
- The Saginaw Chamber of Commerce in a former train station
- Motto(s): Train and Grain
- Location of Saginaw in Tarrant County, Texas
- Coordinates: 32°51′42″N 97°22′00″W
- Country: United States
- State: Texas
- County: Tarrant

Government
  - Type: Council-Manager

Area
  - Total: 7.65 sq mi (19.82 km^{2})
  - Land: 7.65 sq mi (19.82 km^{2})
  - Water: 0.0039 sq mi (0.01 km^{2})
- Elevation: 732 ft (223 m)

Population (2020)
  - Total: 23,890
  - Density: 3,122/sq mi (1,205/km^{2})
- Time zone: UTC-6 (CST)
  - Summer (DST): UTC-5 (CDT)
- ZIP codes: 76131, 76179
- Area code(s): 817, 682
- FIPS code: 48-64112
- GNIS feature ID: 2411754
- Website: City of Saginaw, Texas

Saginaw is a small city in Tarrant County, Texas, United States, and an inner suburb of Fort Worth. Its population was 23,890 in 2020 census. Saginaw is a home rule municipality.

== History ==
The town was renamed Saginaw in 1882 by Jarvis J. Green (after his first choice of "Pontiac" was rejected by the United States Postal Service), who had lived and worked on Saginaw Street in Pontiac, Michigan. The name Saginaw comes from the Ojibwe language and means "to flow out". It is also the name of a river, a bay, and a city in Michigan.

On March 18, 1989, Evergreen International Airlines Flight 17 crashed near Saginaw, killing both pilots (the aircraft's only occupants) on board.

== Geography ==
According to the United States Census Bureau, the city has a total area of 7.5 square miles (19.4 km^{2}), all land.

== Demographics ==
Historical population
Census	Pop.	Note	%±
1950	561		—
1960	1,001		78.4%
1970	2,382		138.0%
1980	5,736		140.8%
1990	8,551		49.1%
2000	12,374		44.7%
2010	19,806		60.1%
2020	23,890		20.6%
U.S. Decennial Census

=== 2020 census ===
As of the 2020 census, Saginaw had a population of 23,890. The median age was 35.9 years. 26.3% of residents were under the age of 18 and 11.6% of residents were 65 years of age or older. For every 100 females there were 97.0 males, and for every 100 females age 18 and over there were 94.3 males age 18 and over.

100.0% of residents lived in urban areas, while 0.0% lived in rural areas.

There were 8,078 households in Saginaw, of which 41.3% had children under the age of 18 living in them. Of all households, 58.1% were married-couple households, 14.1% were households with a male householder and no spouse or partner present, and 21.6% were households with a female householder and no spouse or partner present. About 16.9% of all households were made up of individuals and 6.9% had someone living alone who was 65 years of age or older.

There were 8,292 housing units, of which 2.6% were vacant. The homeowner vacancy rate was 1.0% and the rental vacancy rate was 4.2%.

Racial composition as of the 2020 census
Race	Number	Percent
White	14,963	62.6%
Black or African American	1,749	7.3%
American Indian and Alaska Native	192	0.8%
Asian	843	3.5%
Native Hawaiian and Other Pacific Islander	23	0.1%
Some other race	2,414	10.1%
Two or more races	3,706	15.5%
Hispanic or Latino (of any race)	7,152	29.9%

== Economy ==
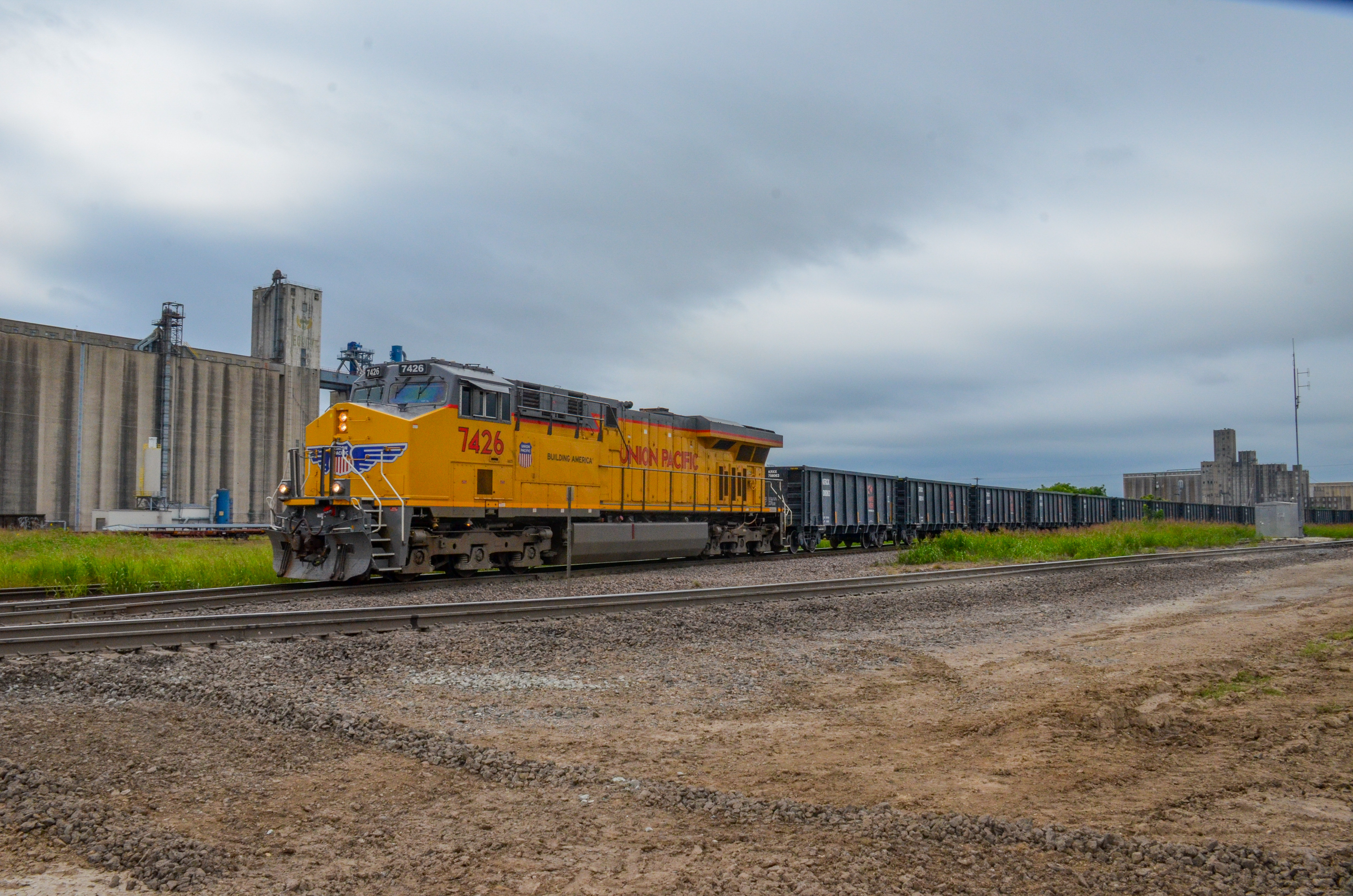
Freight train in Saginaw

=== Top employers ===
Saginaw has two major railroad lines (one operated by Union Pacific and another by BNSF) running through the middle of the city; rail-served heavy industry is located along these lines. Saginaw has a prominent heavy-industrial base when compared to other suburban cities of the same size. Saginaw is known for its "train and grain" heritage, due to the presence of the railroads and two large flour mills located within the city limits. Large grain elevators (visible from miles away) are a prominent feature in the center of the city. According to Saginaw's 2018 Comprehensive Annual Financial Report, the top employers in the city are:

#	Employer	Number of employees	Percentage of total
1	Eagle Mountain-Saginaw ISD	2,541	30%
2	CTI Beanmaker and Chefco Foods	440	5%
3	Ventura Foods	398	5%
4	Walmart Supercenter #5316	393	5%
5	Trinity North American Freight Car	370	4%
6	Anchor Fabrication Corp.	320	4%
7	BANA Incorporated	247	3%
8	Texas Army National Guard	245	3%
9	Ranger Fire Inc.	200	2%
10	Russo Corporation	200	2%

== Education ==
No colleges or universities are present in this small community, but it is served by the nearby Northwest Campus of the Tarrant County College system. The city lies within driving distance to Fort Worth and the rest of the Dallas/Fort Worth metropolitan area, which contains a large number of colleges and universities, including the other Tarrant County College campuses.

Saginaw is served by the Eagle Mountain-Saginaw Independent School District. The five high schools in the district are Boswell High School, Saginaw High School, Chisholm Trail High School, Eagle Mountain High School, and Watson High School/Alternative Discipline Center (the last of which is targeted to at-risk students.)

== Notable people ==
- Brec Bassinger, actress
- Janet Gunn, actress
- Brad Hawpe, former MLB player
- Angela Stanford, LPGA golfer
- Kirk Watson, politician
