= 2024 Austin mayoral election =

- November 5, 2024
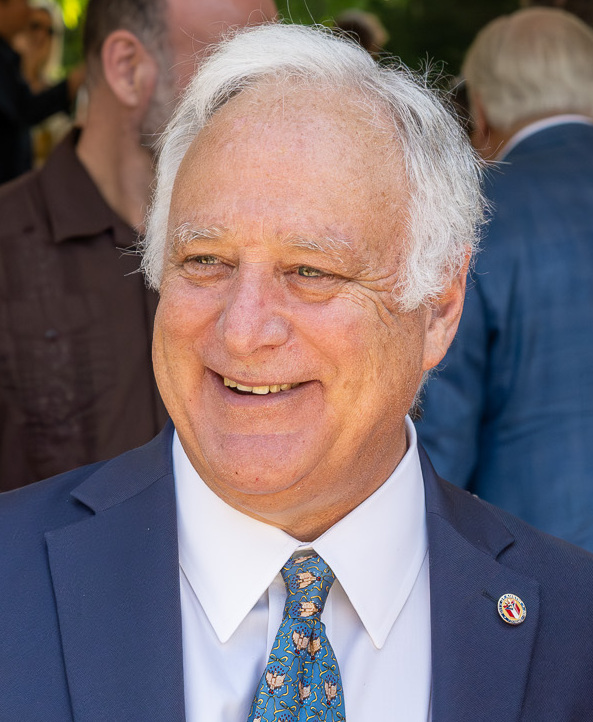

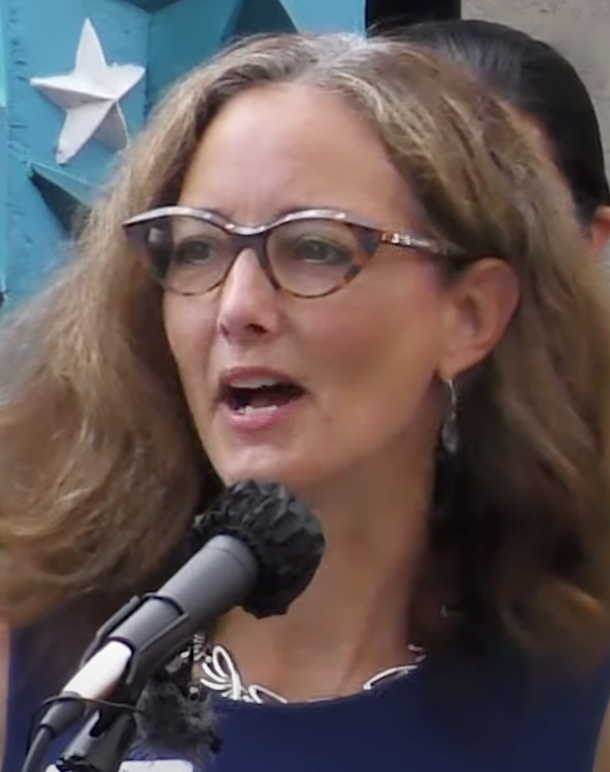

Candidate	Kirk Watson	Carmen Llanes Pulido
Popular vote	175,096	70,540
Percentage	50.0041%	20.14%
Candidate	Kathie Tovo	Jeffrey Bowen
Popular vote	58,280	29,383
Percentage	16.64%	8.39%
- Precinct results Watson: 30–40% 40–50% 50–60% 60–70% 70-80% 100% Pulido: 30–40% 40–50% Tie No votes
Mayor before election
Kirk Watson
Elected mayor
Kirk Watson

The 2024 Austin mayoral election was held on November 5, 2024, to elect the next mayor of Austin, Texas. The election was nonpartisan; the candidates' party affiliations did not appear on the ballot. Incumbent mayor Kirk Watson was running for re-election, after returning to the position of mayor following the 2022 election. On November 15, over a week after election day, Watson was declared the apparent winner of the race after securing 50.0041% of the vote. In the final tally, Watson was a mere 13 votes over the cutoff to avoid a runoff with Carmen Llanes Pulido.

Due to the passage of Prop D in 2021, this is the first Austin mayoral election to coincide with a presidential election.

== Candidates ==
=== Declared ===
- Jeffery Bowen, member of the Austin Board of Adjustment
- Doug Greco, nonprofit executive and author of To Find a Killer (party affiliation: Democratic)
- Carmen Llanes Pulido, former Austin Planning Commission member (party affiliation: Democratic)
- Kathie Tovo, former city councilor from the 9th district (2011–2023) (party affiliation: Democratic)
- Kirk Watson, incumbent mayor (party affiliation: Democratic)

== Debates ==
2024 Austin mayoral election debates
No.	Date	Host	Moderator	Link	Nonpartisan	Nonpartisan	Nonpartisan	Nonpartisan	Nonpartisan
Key: P Participant A Absent N Not invited I Invited W Withdrawn									
Key: P Participant A Absent N Not invited I Invited W Withdrawn					Jeffery Bowen	Doug Greco	Carmen Pulido	Kathie Tovo	Kirk Watson
1	Sep. 25, 2022	Lyndon B. Johnson School of Public Affairs; KLRU; KUT; The Daily Texan; Univision Austin	Francheska Castillo; Luz Moreno-Lozano	KLRU	P	P	P	P	P
2	Oct. 17, 2022	KXAN-TV	Tom Miller; Jennifer Sanders	YouTube	P	P	P	P	P

== Results ==
Following election day, unofficial results from Travis, Williamson and Hays County, with 100% of the precincts reporting, showed incumbent mayor Kirk Watson with 50.01% of the vote and 31 raw votes over the 50% plus one threshold to avoid a runoff with Pulido. At the time, there remained some outstanding ballots yet to be processed, including overseas and military ballots, provisional ballots, and mail-in ballots received the day after election day. On November 13, over a week after election day, the election had still not been called, with an estimated 3,200 provisional ballots yet to be reviewed.

On November 15, KXAN declared Watson the apparent winner of the race after the uncertified final tally showed him with 50.0041% of the vote and 14 raw votes over the threshold to avoid a runoff. Subsequently, Watson declared victory in the race, while Pulido refused to concede saying the race remained too close to call. Travis County and Williamson County did a canvas on November 15 and November 19, respectively, while Hays County's results were official by November 15. On November 18, a final batch of 20 provisional ballots were added from Travis County, with Watson 13 votes above the threshold. The deadline, according to the Texas Secretary of State, for the posts to be finalized was November 19.

On November 21, Pulido requested a recount of 11 specific precincts in Williamson County, but her request was refused because state law demands the recount to be of the entire jurisdiction rather than select parts. On November 22, Pulido conceded the race and said she would not be pursuing a recount or any further actions challenging the outcome.

November 5 general election results
Candidate	Votes	%
Kirk Watson	175,096	50.0041%
Carmen Llanes Pulido	70,550	20.14%
Kathie Tovo	58,280	16.64%
Jeffrey Bowen	29,383	8.39%
Doug Greco	16,865	4.82%
