= 2013 Texas elections =

- November 5, 2013

Elections were held in Texas on November 5, 2013. This included nine legislatively-referred ballot measures to amend the Constitution of Texas, along with special elections for the 50th district of the State House and the 6th district of the State Senate.

== State ==
=== Ballot measures ===
Nine proposed amendments to the Constitution of Texas appeared on the November 5, 2013 general election ballot. All nine amendments were successfully passed.

==== Proposition 1 ====
Proposition 1 provided for an exemption from ad valorem taxation on all or part of the market value of the residence of a surviving spouse of a United States Armed Forces member killed in action.

Yes The measure passed.

Texas Proposition 1
Choice	Votes	%
For	999,724	86.98
Against	149,613	13.02
Total	1,149,337	100.00

==== Proposition 2 ====
Proposition 2 repealed a constitutional provision that required the formation of a State Medical Education Board and a State Medical Education Fund.

Yes The measure passed.

Texas Proposition 2
Choice	Votes	%
For	950,046	84.70
Against	171,666	15.30
Total	1,121,712	100.00

==== Proposition 3 ====
Proposition 3 increased the number of days that aircraft parts held in the state could be exempt from ad valorem taxation.

Yes The measure passed.

Texas Proposition 3
Choice	Votes	%
For	626,602	57.73
Against	458,767	42.27
Total	1,085,369	100.00

==== Proposition 4 ====
Proposition 4 provided for an exemption from ad valorem taxation on part of the market value of a residence if it was the home of a partially disabled veteran or the surviving spouse of a partially disabled veteran, and had been donated to the disabled veteran by a charitable organization.

Yes The measure passed.

Texas Proposition 4
Choice	Votes	%
For	965,377	85.14
Against	168,435	14.86
Total	1,133,812	100.00

==== Proposition 5 ====
Proposition 5 authorized the making of a reverse mortgage loan for the purchase of homestead property, and amended other regulations surrounding reverse mortgage loans.

Yes The measure passed.

Texas Proposition 5
Choice	Votes	%
For	683,402	62.61
Against	408,197	37.39
Total	1,091,599	100.00

==== Proposition 6 ====
Proposition 6 provided for the creation of the State Water Implementation Fund for Texas (SWIFT) and the State Water Implementation Revenue Fund for Texas (SWIRFT) to assist in the financing of projects in the state water plan.

Yes The measure passed.

Texas Proposition 6
Choice	Votes	%
For	839,369	73.35
Against	304,981	26.65
Total	1,144,350	100.00

==== Proposition 7 ====
Proposition 7 authorized a home-rule municipality to detail in its charter the procedure on filling a vacancy on its governing body in which the unexpired term is 12 months or less.

Yes The measure passed.

Texas Proposition 7
Choice	Votes	%
For	809,844	74.38
Against	278,878	25.62
Total	1,088,722	100.00

==== Proposition 8 ====
Proposition 8 repealed the constitutional provision for the creation of a hospital district in Hidalgo County.

Yes The measure passed.

Texas Proposition 8
Choice	Votes	%
For	743,510	72.37
Against	283,933	27.63
Total	1,027,443	100.00

==== Proposition 9 ====
Proposition 9 expanded the types of sanctions against a judge or justice following disciplinary proceedings instituted by the State Commission on Judicial Conduct.

Yes The measure passed.

Texas Proposition 9
Choice	Votes	%
For	925,509	84.65
Against	167,825	15.35
Total	1,093,334	100.00

== Special elections ==
=== Texas's 50th House of Representatives district special election ===
2013 Texas's 50th House of Representatives district special election (runoff)
- January 28, 2014
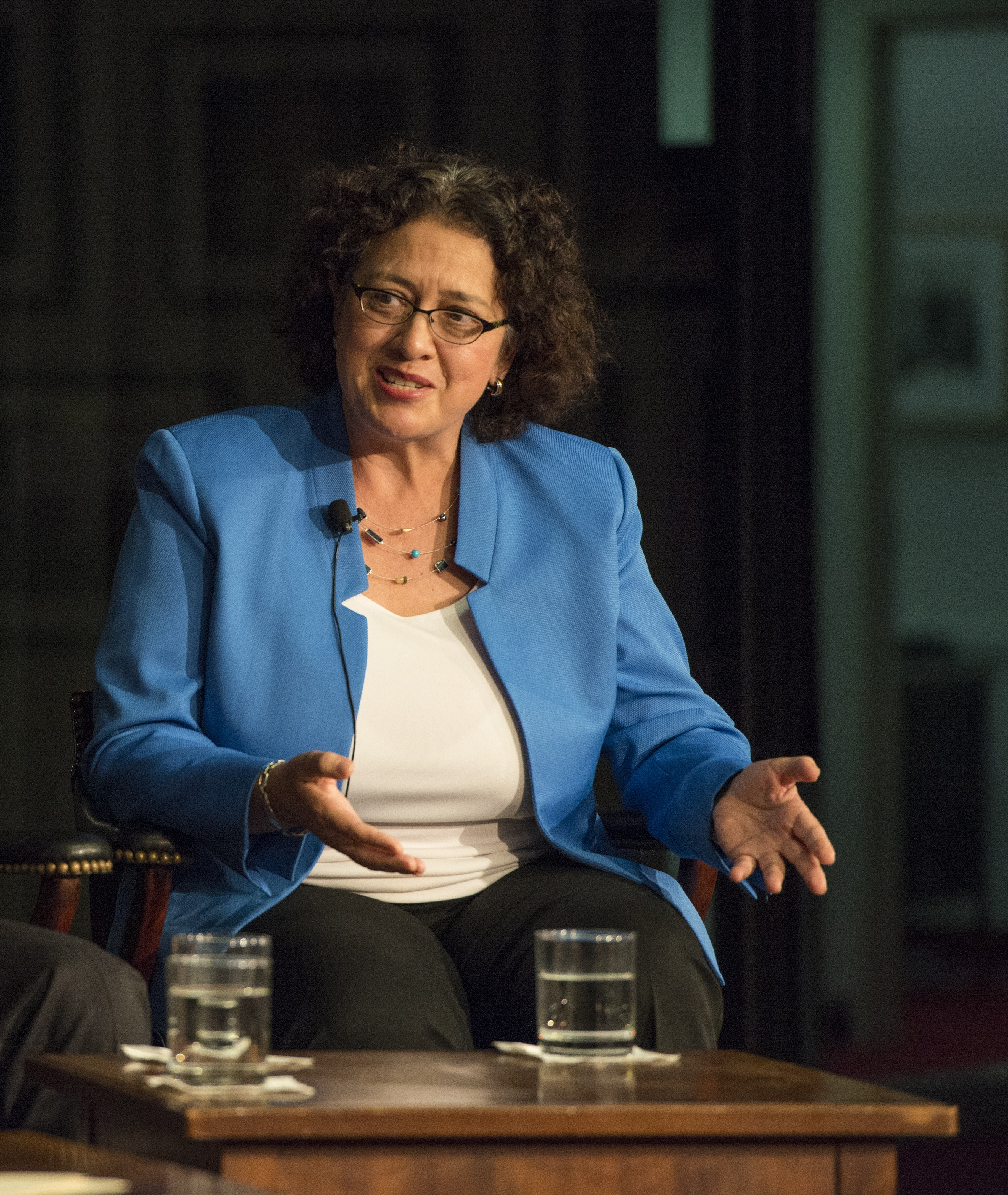

Nominee	Celia Israel	Mike VanDeWalle
Party	Democratic	Republican
Popular vote	6,275	4,245
Percentage	59.65%	40.35%
Representative before election
Mark Strama
Democratic
Elected Representative
Celia Israel
Democratic

A special election took place in Texas's 50th House of Representatives district after the resignation of Democratic Representative Mark Strama, who left politics to lead Google Fiber's operations in Austin. As no candidate reached 50% of the vote in the November 5, 2013 election, a runoff election took place on January 28, 2014. The runoff was won by Democratic candidate Celia Israel, who defeated Republican Mike VanDeWalle.

==== November 5, 2013 ====
===== Candidates =====
- Jade Chang Sheppard (Democratic), owner of Gideon Contracting
- Celia Israel (Democratic), realtor and community activist
- Rico Reyes (Democratic), attorney and former Marine
- Mike VanDeWalle (Republican), chiropractor

===== Endorsements =====
Celia Israel (D)

State representatives

- Eddie Rodriguez, 51st district (2003−present)

Political parties

- Austin Environmental Democrats
- University Democrats
- Stonewall Democrats of Austin

Organizations

- Equality Texas
Mike VanDeWalle (R)

Individuals

- Michael Cargill, guns rights activist

Political parties

- Travis County Republican Party

===== Results =====
2013 Texas House of Representatives 50th district special election
Party	Candidate	Votes	%
Republican	Mike VanDeWalle	5,853	39.19%
Democratic	Celia Israel	4,755	31.84%
Democratic	Jade Chang Sheppard	2,335	15.63%
Democratic	Rico Reyes	1,993	13.34%
Total votes		14,936	100.00%

==== January 28, 2014 (runoff) ====
===== Results =====
2013 Texas House of Representatives 50th district special runoff election
Party	Candidate	Votes	%
Democratic	Celia Israel	6,275	59.65%
Republican	Mike VanDeWalle	4,245	40.35%
Total votes		10,520	100.00%
Democratic hold			

=== Texas's 6th Senate district special election ===
2013 Texas's 6th Senate district special election (runoff)
- March 2, 2013
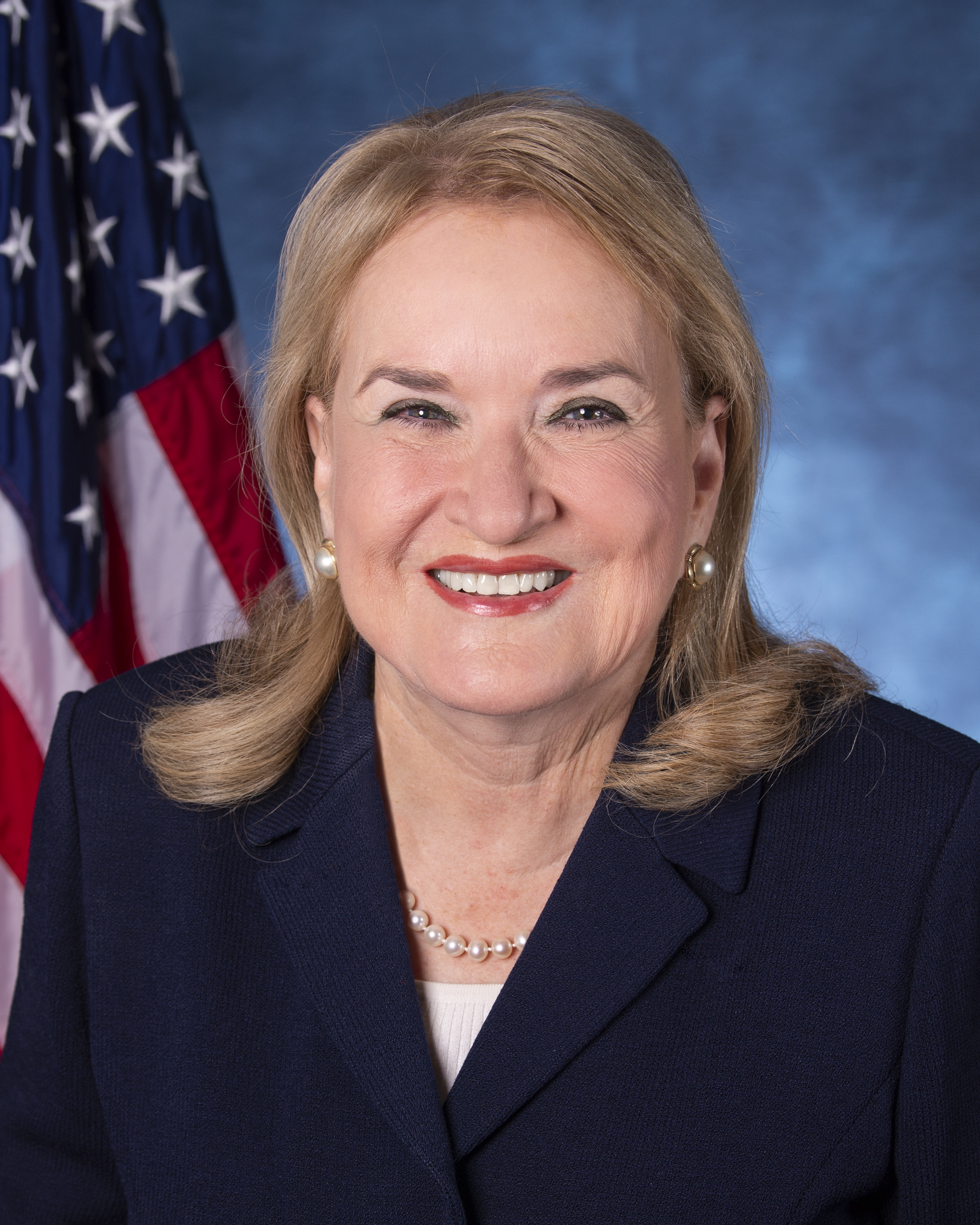

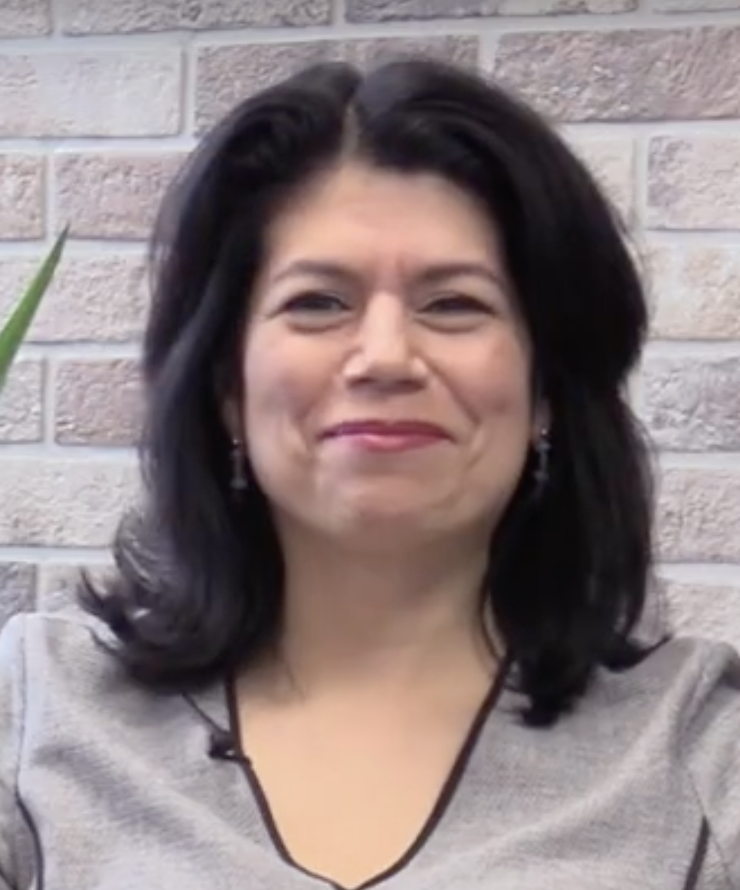
Nominee	Sylvia Garcia	Carol Alvarado
Party	Democratic	Democratic
Popular vote	9,595	8,546
Percentage	52.89%	47.11%
Senator before election
Mario Gallegos Jr.
Democratic
Elected Senator
Sylvia Garcia
Democratic

On October 16, 2012 State Senator Mario Gallegos Jr. of the 6th district died from complications associated with his liver transplant. However, during the 2012 general election, Gallegos' name remained on the ballot and he was re-elected. As a result, a special election was called for January 26, 2013. As no candidates reached at least 50% of the vote in the special election, a runoff took place on March 2. There, Democrat Sylvia Garcia defeated fellow Democrat Carol Alvarado to win the seat.

==== January 26, 2013 ====
===== Candidates =====
- Carol Alvarado (Democratic), State Representative from the 145th district
- R.W. Bray (Republican), 2012 election candidate
- Susan Delgado (Democratic), real estate broker
- Sylvia Garcia (Democratic), former Harris County Commissioner and City of Houston Controller
- Joaquin Martinez (Democratic), community leader
- Dorothy Olmos (Republican), educator and State Board of Education candidate
- Rodolfo Reyes (Democratic), business consultant and former League City Council member
- Maria Selva (Green), community organizer

===== Results =====
2013 Texas Senate 6th district special election
Party	Candidate	Votes	%
Democratic	Sylvia Garcia	7,424	45.35%
Democratic	Carol Alvarado	6,813	41.62%
Republican	R.W. Bray	1,015	6.20%
Republican	Dorothy Olmos	461	2.82%
Democratic	Joaquin Martinez	405	2.47%
Democratic	Rodolfo Reyes	125	0.76%
Green	Maria Selva	73	0.45%
Democratic	Susan Delgado	53	0.32%
Total votes		16,369	100.00%

==== March 2, 2013 (runoff) ====
===== Results =====
2013 Texas Senate 6th district special runoff election
Party	Candidate	Votes	%
Democratic	Sylvia Garcia	9,595	52.89%
Democratic	Carol Alvarado	8,546	47.11%
Total votes		18,141	100.00%
Democratic hold			

== Local elections ==
- Arlington: Incumbent mayor Robert Cluck was re-elected for a sixth term.
- El Paso: Oscar Leeser was elected to his first term as mayor, as incumbent John Cook was unable to seek a third term due to term limits.
- Houston: Incumbent mayor Annise Parker was re-elected to a third term.
- San Antonio: Incumbent mayor Julian Castro was re-elected to a third term.

== See also ==
- 2013 United States elections
