= Encore! (TV series) =

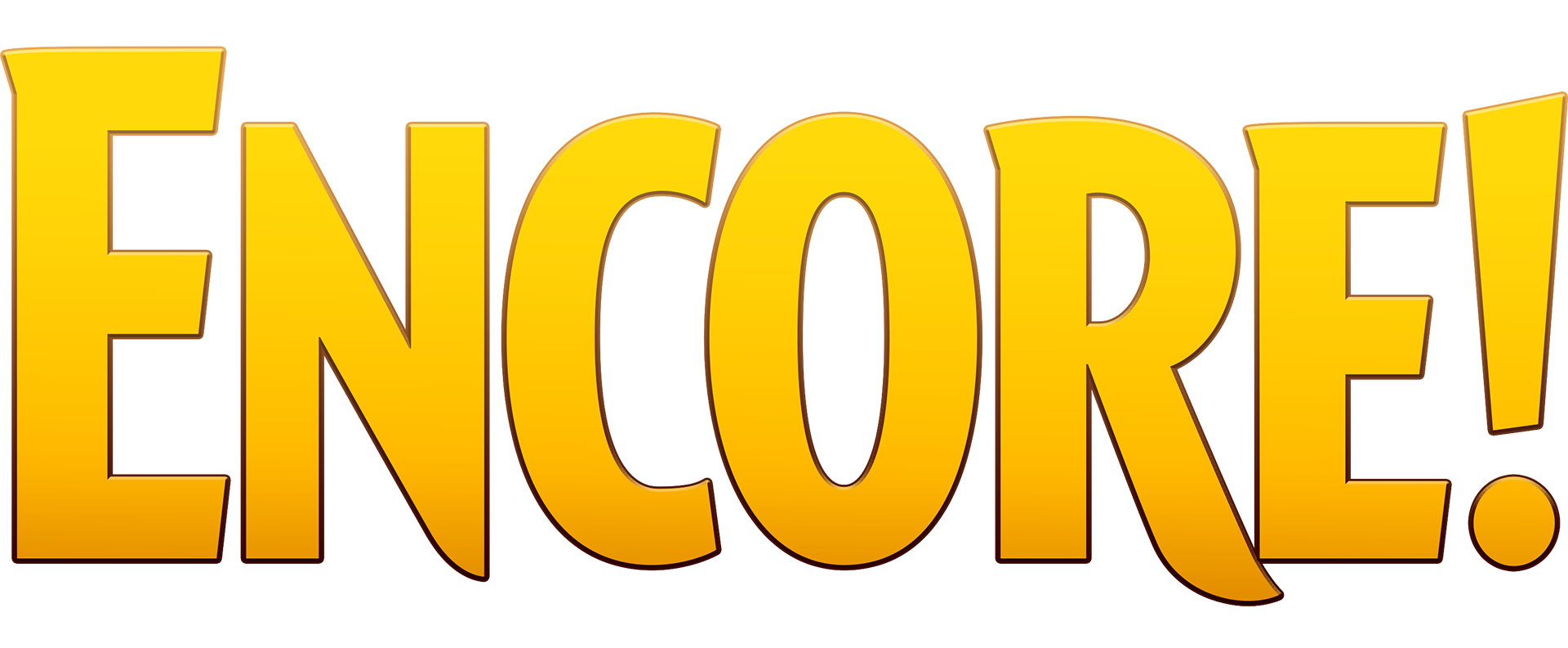
- Genre: Reality; Docuseries
- Developed by: Jason Cohen
- Presented by: Kristen Bell
- Country of origin: United States
- Original language: English
- No. of seasons: 1
- No. of episodes: 12

Production
- Executive producers: Jason Cohen; Kristen Bell; Alycia Rossiter; Will Gluck; Richard Schwartz; Jim Roush; Chris Wagner
- Production companies: Olive Bridge Entertainment; Leading Laidy; Jason Cohen Productions; Primate Pictures; The Roush Wagner Company

Original release
- Network: Disney+
- Release: November 12, 2019 – January 24, 2020

Encore! is an American reality television series hosted and executive produced by Kristen Bell and Will Gluck. Based on a pilot special aired on ABC on December 10, 2017, the series premiered on Disney+ on November 12, 2019. The series was removed from Disney+ on May 26, 2023.

== Premise ==
Encore! reunites the cast members of high school musicals to recreate their performance years after they originally performed.

== Production ==
=== Development ===
A television special, also titled Encore! and hosted by Bell, aired on ABC on December 10, 2017. It reunited the cast of a 1997 South Hills High School production of Into the Woods to recreate their original performance.

In April 2019, Disney+ ordered a series based on the special, to be hosted and executive produced by Kristen Bell.

When asked during the COVID-19 pandemic about the future of the series, creator Jason Cohen said, "Obviously, things right now are a little bit funky, with the coronavirus, and things have been thrown into flux a bit. But we are hoping we can do more."

== Episodes ==
Season	Episodes	Originally released		
Season	Episodes	First released	Last released	Network
Special		December 10, 2017		ABC
1	12	November 12, 2019	January 24, 2020	Disney+

=== Special (2017) ===
No.	Title	Musical	High school	Original release date
–	"Special"	Into the Woods	South Hills High School	December 10, 2017

=== Season 1 (2019–20) ===
No.	Title	Musical	High school	Original release date
1	"Annie • 1996 • Santee, CA"	Annie	Santana High School	November 12, 2019
2	"Beauty and the Beast • 2007 • Saginaw, TX"	Beauty and the Beast	Saginaw High School	November 15, 2019
3	"The Sound of Music • 1992 • Flint, MI"	The Sound of Music	Flint Central High School (Note: Since the school has since closed, the production was staged at Swartz Creek Performing Arts Center.)	November 22, 2019
4	"Grease • 1990 • Hackensack, NJ"	Grease	Hackensack High School	November 29, 2019
5	"Annie Get Your Gun • 1998 • Satellite Beach, FL"	Annie Get Your Gun	Satellite High School	December 6, 2019
6	"Oklahoma • 1991 • Snellville, GA"	Oklahoma!	Brookwood High School	December 13, 2019
7	"Godspell • 1998 • Houston, TX"	Godspell	Eisenhower High School	December 20, 2019
8	"Fiddler on the Roof • 2001 • Anaheim, CA"	Fiddler on the Roof	Katella High School	December 27, 2019
9	"Pippin • 1984 • Louisville, KY"	Pippin	Youth Performing Arts School	January 3, 2020
10	"High School Musical • 2007 • Fish Creek, WI"	High School Musical	Gibraltar High School	January 10, 2020
11	"Anything Goes • 1975 • Los Angeles, CA"	Anything Goes	Los Angeles High School	January 17, 2020
12	"Ragtime • 2008 • Santa Monica, CA"	Ragtime	Pacific Christian High School	January 24, 2020

== Release ==
Encore! debuted on November 12, 2019, on the streaming service Disney+ in 4K HDR. Episodes were released weekly rather than all at once.

The series was removed from Disney+ on May 26, 2023.

=== Marketing ===
A first trailer of the show was released on August 23, 2019, at the Disney+ Panel at D23 Expo 2019.

== Reception ==
=== Critical reception ===
The review aggregator website Rotten Tomatoes reported a 70% approval rating for the first season with an average rating of 6.50/10, based on 20 reviews. The website's critical consensus reads, "While it often feels more like a dress rehearsal, Encore! has just enough charm to keep theater lovers in their seats–though everyone else may duck out at intermission". Metacritic, which uses a weighted average, assigned a score of 63 out of 100 based on 12 critics, indicating "generally favorable reviews".

Lorraine Ali of Los Angeles Times praised the concept of Encore! and called it original, found the series humorous across the goofs and the dialogues of the performers, and claimed that the stories and emotions provided by the cast members manage to add depth to the show. Joyce Slaton of Common Sense Media rated the series 4 out of 5 stars, praised the depiction of positives messages, such as perseverance and teamwork, while complimenting the presence of role models, citing their honesty and emotional take with their stories. Gretchen Smail of IGN gave a 6 out of 10 rating, stated that the series provides a feeling of nostalgia through the performers reconnecting with their past, but found that the format of the show does not allow the cast members to come with a story sufficiently developed about themselves.

=== Accolades ===
Year	Award	Category	Nominee(s)	Result	Ref.
2020	Directors Guild of America Awards	Outstanding Directing – Reality Programs	Jason Cohen (for "Annie")	Won	
2020	TCA Awards	Outstanding Achievement in Reality Programming	Encore!	Nominated	
