= Eagle Mountain, Texas =

- Neighborhood of Saginaw, Texas; Former Census-designated place
- Location within the state of Texas
- Coordinates: 32°53′15″N 97°27′3″W
- Country: United States
- State: Texas
- County: Tarrant

Area
  - Total: 22.4 sq mi (57.9 km^{2})
  - Land: 22.3 sq mi (57.8 km^{2})
  - Water: 0.039 sq mi (0.1 km^{2})
- Elevation: 669 ft (204 m)

Population (2000)
  - Total: 6,599
  - Density: 296/sq mi (114.1/km^{2})
- Time zone: UTC-6 (Central (CST))
  - Summer (DST): UTC-5 (CDT)
- FIPS code: 48-21856
- GNIS feature ID: 1867548

Eagle Mountain is a former census-designated place (CDP) in Tarrant County, Texas, United States. The population was 6,599 at the 2000 census. It is now a part of the city of Saginaw.

== Geography ==
Eagle Mountain is located at 32°53′15″N 97°27′03″W (32.887545, -97.450735).

According to the United States Census Bureau, the CDP has a total area of 22.4 square miles (57.9 km^{2}), of which 22.3 square miles (57.8 km^{2}) is land and 0.04 square mile (0.1 km^{2}) (0.18%) is water.

Eagle Mountain Lake is located to the east of the community.

== Demographics ==
Historical population
Census	Pop.	Note	%±
1990	5,847		—
2000	6,599		12.9%
U.S. Decennial Census; 1850–1900 1910; 1920 1930 1940; 1950 1960 1970; 1980 1990 2000; 2010

Eagle Mountain first appeared as a census designated place in 1990 U.S. census. It was absorbed by the city of Saginaw prior to the 2010 U.S. census.

As of the census of 2000, there were 6,599 people, 2,596 households, and 2,004 families residing in the CDP. The population density was 295.6 inhabitants per square mile (114.1/km^{2}). There were 2,819 housing units at an average density of 126.3 per square mile (48.8/km^{2}). The racial makeup of the CDP was 94.67% White, 0.92% African American, 0.53% Native American, 0.71% Asian, 0.03% Pacific Islander, 1.27% from other races, and 1.86% from two or more races. Hispanic or Latino of any race were 3.99% of the population.

There were 2,596 households, out of which 32.1% had children under the age of 18 living with them, 69.0% were married couples living together, 5.7% had a female householder with no husband present, and 22.8% were non-families. 19.9% of all households were made up of individuals, and 4.9% had someone living alone who was 65 years of age or older. The average household size was 2.54 and the average family size was 2.93.

In the CDP, the population was spread out, with 24.0% under the age of 18, 5.9% from 18 to 24, 26.6% from 25 to 44, 33.4% from 45 to 64, and 10.1% who were 65 years of age or older. The median age was 42 years. For every 100 females, there were 101.1 males. For every 100 females age 18 and over, there were 98.8 males.

The median income for a household in the CDP was $76,100, and the median income for a family was $85,420. Males had a median income of $54,306 versus $34,515 for females. The per capita income for the CDP was $33,934. About 2.1% of families and 3.8% of the population were below the poverty line, including 4.4% of those under age 18 and 4.7% of those age 65 or over.

== Education ==
Eagle Mountain is served by the Eagle Mountain-Saginaw Independent School District.
