= Kirk Watson =

American politician

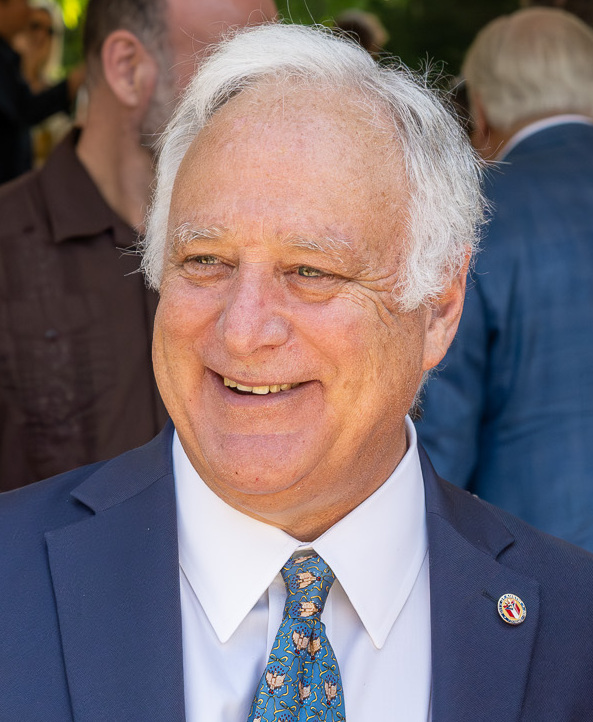
- Watson in 2023

54th and 59th Mayor of Austin
- Incumbent
- Assumed office January 6, 2023
- Preceded by: Steve Adler
- In office June 15, 1997 – November 9, 2001
- Preceded by: Bruce Todd
- Succeeded by: Gus Garcia

President pro tempore of the Texas Senate
- In office January 8, 2019 – May 27, 2019
- Preceded by: Robert Nichols
- Succeeded by: Joan Huffman

Member of the Texas Senate from the 14th district
- In office January 9, 2007 – April 30, 2020
- Preceded by: Gonzalo Barrientos
- Succeeded by: Sarah Eckhardt

Personal details
- Born: Kirk Preston Watson; March 18, 1958 (age 68) Oklahoma City, Oklahoma, U.S.
- Party: Democratic
- Spouse: Liz McDaniel
- Children: 2
- Education: Baylor University (BA, JD)

Kirk Preston Watson (born March 18, 1958) is an American attorney and politician who has served as the 59th mayor of Austin since 2023, previously holding the office as the 54th mayor from 1997 to 2001. A member of the Democratic Party, he ran unsuccessfully for Texas attorney general in the 2002 election, where he was defeated by Republican Greg Abbott, later governor of Texas. In 2006, Watson was elected to the Texas Senate from District 14.

In 2011, Watson was chosen by his Democratic colleagues to chair the Senate Democratic Caucus and served until 2015. On the first day of the 86th Texas Legislature, he was chosen by his colleagues—Democrats and Republicans—to serve as president pro tempore. The position typically goes to the most senior member, regardless of party, who has not yet served as president pro tem, and is second in line of succession to the Governor.

It was announced by the Austin American-Statesman that Watson had planned to resign from the Texas Senate to become the first dean of the University of Houston's Hobby School of Public Affairs. His resignation was effective April 30, 2020. With incumbent Mayor Steve Adler not seeking another term, Watson entered the race to become Austin mayor for a second time. He was elected for his second stint as mayor in the 2022 Austin mayoral election runoff with 50.4% of the vote. Watson was reelected in 2024, earning 175,090 votes, about 13 votes over the threshold needed to avoid a runoff. The next closest candidate earned 70,535 votes.

== Early life and education ==
Watson was born in Oklahoma City and raised in Saginaw, Texas, a suburb of Fort Worth, where he attended Boswell High School. He received a bachelor's degree in political science in 1980 and a Juris Doctor in 1981 from Baylor University in Waco, Texas. At Baylor Law School, Watson was editor-in-chief of the Baylor Law Review and graduated first in his class. He subsequently clerked for the U.S. Court of Appeals for the Fifth Circuit.

== Early political career ==
Watson was elected president of the Texas Young Lawyers Association in 1990 and served on the executive committee of the State Bar of Texas. Watson was an active Democrat throughout the 1990s and served as the chairman of the Travis County Democratic Party.

In 1991, Watson was appointed by Governor Ann Richards to serve as chairman of the Texas Air Control Board, the state agency that was charged with protecting air quality in Texas. During his tenure, he worked to merge the agency with the Texas Air Control Board and the Texas Water Commission to form the Texas Natural Resources Conservation Commission, and oversaw implementation of the 1991 amendments to the federal Clean Air Act. In 1992, as chair of the Board, Watson worked with members of the East Austin community to remove a petroleum storage tank farm located inside their residential neighborhood. The tank farm was a byproduct of decades of redlining, allowing industrial facilities to form next to communities of color.

In 1994, he was named the Outstanding Young Lawyer of Texas. In 1997, Watson co-founded the Austin law firm of Watson Bishop London & Galow, creating a broad law practice that represented families, doctors, small businesses, and some of the state's major universities.

== First term as Mayor of Austin (1997–2001) ==
In 1997, after Watson moved from Rollingwood to Austin, he was elected as the 54th mayor of Austin, a nonpartisan position. He ran on a pledge to build consensus in a city that was then dominated by political battles between environmentalists and developers. He campaigned to raise more than $78 million for land preservation and $300 million for transportation improvements. Watson's signature accomplishments as mayor included the transformation of Downtown Austin into a "24-hour downtown" by encouraging development of housing and retail in place of vacant warehouses and parking lots, partially through tax incentives and the city's Smart Growth initiatives.

In 1999, Watson spearheaded a redevelopment project along several blocks of waterfront property in Downtown Austin, in an effort to create a new public-private "digital district" in place of dilapidated warehouses and businesses including the former Liberty Lunch, which were demolished. Watson, along with architect Larry Speck, courted the Computer Sciences Corporation (CSC) by offering a $10.4 million tax incentive to anchor two office buildings on the site in lieu of building their planned campus in a watershed, and under the condition that CSC foot the bill for a new city hall building. The first two buildings were constructed and are now part of the Second Street District, while CSC vacated the premises before following through with the construction of the present-day Austin City Hall.

In 2000, Watson spearheaded a $15.1 million tax incentive for Intel to build a new headquarters in Downtown Austin; Intel stopped construction and the unfinished building was demolished in 2007 and replaced by the Austin United States Courthouse.

In 2000, Watson was reelected with 84% of the vote – the highest percentage a mayoral candidate has ever received in Austin. In November 2001, he stepped down to run unsuccessfully for Texas attorney general in the 2002 election, losing 41% to 57% to now-Governor Greg Abbott. In 2005, he served as chairman of the Greater Austin Chamber of Commerce.

== Texas Senate (2007–2020) ==
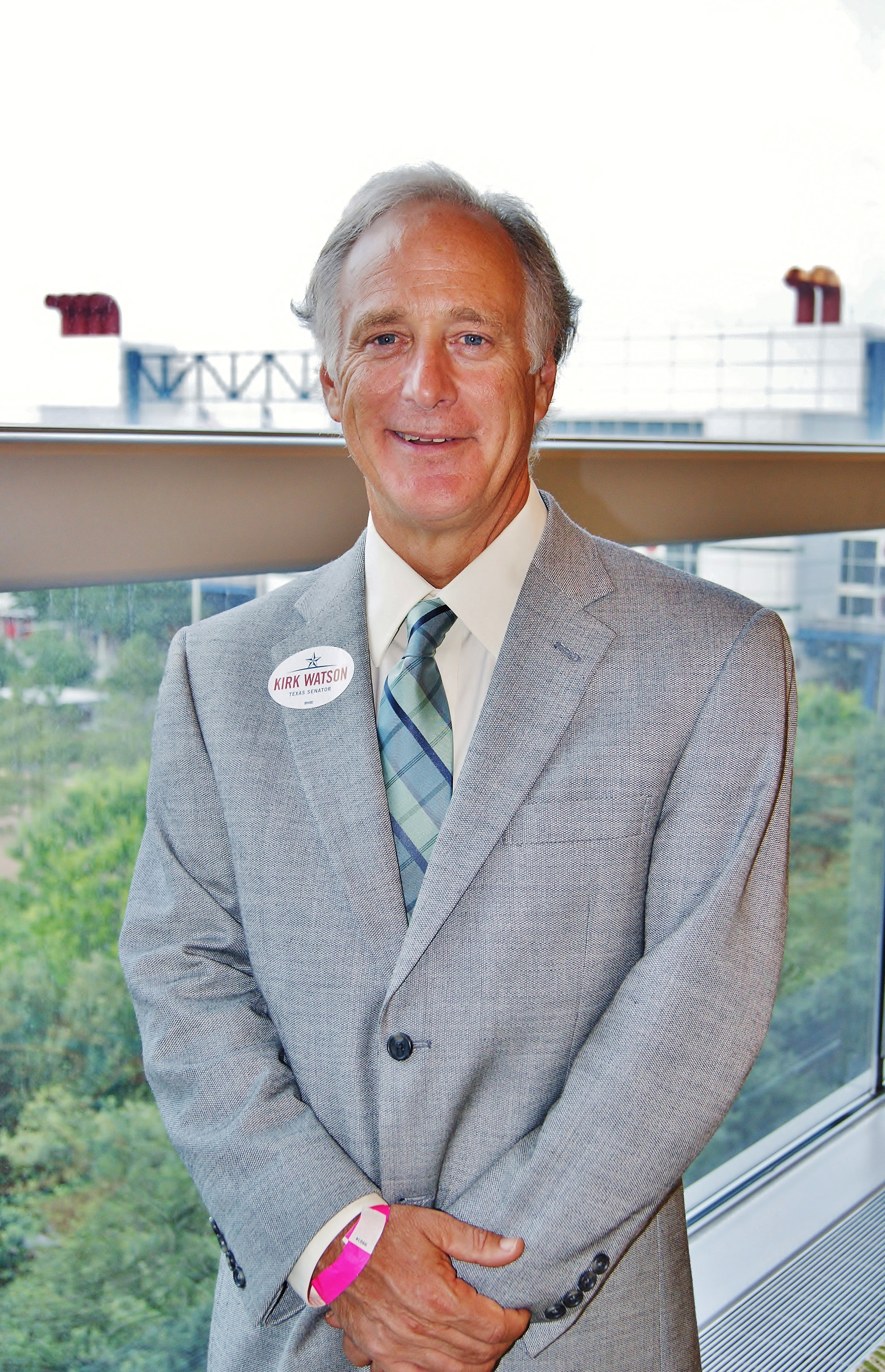
Watson in 2012

Watson was elected to the Texas Senate in November 2006, succeeding Senator Gonzalo Barrientos. He received more than 80% of the vote. Watson was unopposed in the March 2006 Democratic Primary.

He took office in January 2007. Watson served as vice-chairman of the Senate Transportation and Homeland Security committee, as well as on the Senate Business and Commerce, Economic Development, Jurisprudence, and Nominations committees. In 2008, he was appointed as one of two senators to the state Business Tax Advisory Committee.

Watson has become a prominent voice on transportation, clean energy, and higher education issues, and he has campaigned to widen transparency in the state's finances and increase health coverage for Texans, particularly children. In 2009, he led the fight against a budget rider that would have effectively banned embryonic stem cell research at Texas universities. The rider ultimately was not adopted.

Watson served on many committees including the Capital Area Metropolitan Planning Organization (CAMPO), of which he is the former Transportation Policy Board Chairman. CAMPO is federally designated as the primary transportation planning organization in Central Texas.

The July 2007 Texas Monthly magazine recognized Watson as "Rookie of the Year" for the 2007 session of the Texas Legislature. In 2009, the magazine named him one of the state's 10 Best Legislators and referred to him as "the Galápagos penguin of the Texas Legislature." He also was given the Price Daniel Award for Distinguished Public Service by the Baylor Alumni Association, and the Excellence in Leadership Award by Concordia University Texas.

Watson endorsed Senator Barack Obama in the 2008 Democratic party presidential primaries. Following Obama's victory in the 2008 Wisconsin Democratic primary election on February 19, 2008, Watson appeared via live feed on MSNBC's election night coverage as a supporter of Senator Obama. He was asked by Chris Matthews to name one of Senator Obama's legislative accomplishments. Watson was soon after excused, and Matthews commented, "He [Watson] is here to defend Barack Obama and he had nothing to say; that's a problem."

Watson considered running in the 2010 gubernatorial election, but decided in August 2009 to instead seek re-election to the Texas Senate.

In June 2013, Watson moved to overturn a ruling designed to end the filibuster of Senator Wendy Davis. Together, their efforts averted the passage of SB5, a bill that its opponents claimed would enact severe abortion restrictions in Texas. Instead, in a second special session the same bill was passed (96 to 49) by the Texas House, and then (19 to 11) by the Texas Senate, and then signed into law by Gov. Perry less than a month later. State representative Charles "Doc" Anderson of Waco (Texas HD 56) told reporters following the Davis filibuster that the additional special session might "cost taxpayers more than $800,000." Another news organization estimated special-session costs at roughly $30,000 per day.

In the general election on November 6, 2018, Watson easily won reelection, 274,122 (74.1%) to 96,355 (25.3%) for his Republican opponent, George W. Hindman. A Libertarian Party candidate, Micah M. Verlander, held another 10,838 votes (2.8%).

In 2019, Watson proposed a series of money-raising maneuvers to fund the lane expansion project along I-35 through Austin, including doubling the state gas tax, raising vehicle registration fees in Travis County, enacting a special sales tax, and issuing bonds. He was again recognized as one of Texas Monthly's "Best Legislators" in 2019 for his role in blocking the confirmation of David Whitley as Texas Secretary of State.

Watson resigned from the Texas State Senate on April 30, 2020, to become the first dean of the University of Houston's Hobby School of Public Affairs. Watson resigned from the University of Houston after less than 1 year to become a candidate for mayor of Austin.

=== Texas highways ===
Much of Watson's first year in office was spent mediating a long, very bitter dispute on the CAMPO board over highway improvements in the Austin area. While many of the improvements had been in transportation plans for years, they had never been constructed. A lack of transportation funding, affecting projects across Texas, had led previous boards to support plans that would toll the additional capacity as well as nearly completed projects, sparking intense opposition throughout the region.

Upon being elected chairman by the rest of the board in January 2007, Watson led the effort to keep the controversial projects in the region's transportation plan. He then spearheaded a public effort to create a process that would allow policy makers and the public to analyze the need for transportation projects, mechanisms to pay for them, and potential public benefits from them.

On October 8, 2007, the CAMPO board overwhelmingly approved a plan to add new toll lanes to several existing highways (U.S. Highway 290, U.S. Highway 183, and State Highway 71). Most of the improvements were approved on a 15–4 vote, and none were opposed by more than five board members.

== Second term as Mayor of Austin (2023–present) ==
=== Elections ===
Watson declared his candidacy for the 2022 mayoral election. In the November 8 general election, he advanced to a runoff election against Celia Israel. On December 13, 2022, Watson won the runoff election with 57,346 votes (50.39%) to his opponent Israel's 56,460 votes (49.61%). An proposition adopted the year prior changed the election of mayor to coincide with the presidential election and as such the 2022 election was for a shortened term of two years. Watson ran for reelection for a full four-year term in 2024 and won in the first round, narrowly avoiding a runoff by 13 votes.

=== Tenure ===
Watson was sworn in a second time as mayor of Austin on January 6, 2023. Shortly after beginning his second term as mayor of Austin, Watson led an effort to terminate city manager Spencer Cronk, who was fired in a 10–1 vote by City Council. The decision came following the city's handling of communications and response to the winter storm, which resulted in long-term power outages for thousands of city residents lasting up to 12 days, and the City Manager's decision to announce a four-year contract with the Austin Police Association — against the wishes of City Council to vote on a one-year contract amid negotiations and a May election over police oversight.

The council appointed Jesús Garza — a previous city manager during Watson's previous tenure as mayor, and manager of the Stand Together Austin political action committee that supported Watson's mayoral campaign. As interim city manager, Garza focused on improving basic city operations and replaced the General Manager of Austin Energy, the CEO of Austin's airport, the head of emergency operations, and the assistant city manager overseeing public safety.

=== Public safety ===
In March 2023, amid staffing shortages, 911 response delays at the Austin Police Department, and a viral spree of street racing incidents in which cop cars were harassed with live fireworks, Watson reached an agreement with Governor Greg Abbott and Lt. Governor Dan Patrick to deploy the Texas Department of Public Safety troopers to patrol Austin, drawing scrutiny from some city council members who were left out of conversations prior to the announcement.

Under Watson's tenure, response times at Austin's 911 call center improved, with operators answering 93.28% of calls within 15 seconds in November 2023 compared to July 2023 when only 69.18% of calls in 15 seconds or less.

On October 23, 2024, Austin City Council voted to approve a five-year contract with the Austin Police Association by a vote of 10–1 with Council Member Zo Qadri casting the lone no vote. Previously, the Austin Police Association had been operating without a long-term agreement since September 2022, which had impacted their recruiting and retention efforts and had left the police department with over 300 vacancies.

=== Homelessness ===
In July 2023, Watson helped secure almost $65 million from the state of Texas for local community groups to expand emergency shelters and provide more resources for people experiencing homelessness. In addition, Watson also led the effort to add hundreds of shelter beds to Austin's homeless response system through the opening of the Marshalling Yard, the reopening of the Salvation Army shelter, and the expansion of the city's Northbridge and Southbridge shelters.

In August 2023, Integral Care, Travis County's largest mental health provider, announced it was planning to eliminate several staff positions due to budget issues. Following the news, Watson immediately began to work with Integral Care and Central Health to find a stop-gap funding solution. On September 6, 2023, Central Health, voted to approve its 2024 budget with last-minute emergency funding to Integral Care.

In part, due to the Integral Care funding situation, Watson signaled the need for an independent third party review of homelessness services across the City of Austin, Travis County, Central Health and Integral Care. In his newsletter, Watson argued that "part of our problem is that we’ve developed a bad habit of seeking funding for programs without establishing how we’ll ultimately judge success. We’re too often measuring progress simply by how much we’re spending, not by the actual results of that spending. Focusing on the money may create the appearance of great effort, but it’s not helping us to get ahead of the challenge."

The effort was thwarted by the Travis County Commissioner's Court in February 2024. The Commissioner's Court took issue with the selection of the consulting firm Mckinsey & Company to conduct the audit as well as a belief that the money for an audit could be used in better ways.

=== Housing ===
For decades, efforts to reform Austin's land use planning policies faced strong opposition from some homeowners and established neighborhood associations, who feared reforms would upset their own neighborhood character— forcing unwelcome changes in the makeup. The last time Austin had a significant change in the code was in 1984.

The movement to reform land use policies in Austin gained traction in recent years because of the city's dramatic population growth and rise in housing prices, coupled with a comparatively low housing stock, and the elections of several pro-housing candidates to the Austin City Council in 2022.

In an interview with the Texas Tribune in 2023, Watson signaled that the new Austin City Council would approach land use reform differently than previous ones: "We've got a supply and demand problem, and we're going to have to come up with unique and different ways than we've thought of in the past to solve it."

On December 7, 2023, Austin City Council took the first steps to reform housing policies by passing several new code amendments— including giving homeowners more freedom and the ability to build an additional unit on their lot. In the spring of 2024, Austin City Council will consider more reforms including encouraging more transit-oriented developments, reducing the 5,750-square-foot minimum lot size in residential areas, and loosening compatibility rules.

Watson faced criticism from some property owners who strongly opposed any changes in the land development code that would allow for more density, citing concerns about neighborhood character and worries about increased gentrification. Reform advocates argue that under the current land development code, gentrification and displacement have already accelerated.

Research by NYU's Furman Center suggest that policies which constrained the housing supply may have unintended consequences for communities including environmental costs from a dependency on automobiles, growing suburban and rural sprawl, and increasing inequality.

=== Project Connect ===
In November 2020, Austin voters overwhelmingly approved dedicating a portion of the city's property tax rate to fund Project Connect, Austin's multibillion-dollar improvement and expansion plan. This voter-approved funding included light rail, an expansion of rapid bus routes, and anti-displacement funds.

In the 88th Texas legislative session, Republican legislators Representative Ellen Troxclair and Senator Paul Bettencourt filed several pieces of legislation specifically targeting Austin's voter-approved propositions, including the effort to kill Project Connect. Watson worked with lawmakers in the Texas House to keep Project Connect alive from a last-minute senate amendment by Bettencourt that would have killed its financing.

In November 2023, a small group of residents including former state senator Gonzalo Barrientos, Travis County commissioner Margaret Gómez, former Austin Council member Ora Houston, former city council candidate Susana Almanza, and hamburger restaurant Dirty Martin's filed a lawsuit to halt the Project Connect's funding mechanism. The plaintiffs found support in Texas Attorney General Ken Paxton, who issued a court filing challenging the validity of Project Connect's funding mechanism.

In response to the plaintiff's lawsuit, Austin Transit Partnership, the local government corporation tasked with implementing Project Connect filed a bond validation petition in the Travis County District Court. The petition expedites a determination from an impartial court to affirm ATP's bond program. The bond validation trial was set for May 28, 2024.

On September 24, 2024, it was announced that Project Connect would tentatively be going forward with a $193 million budget that would hopefully break ground in 2027. The project also includes two bus lanes that will begin operating in 2025. The exact budget was $172 million in funding from taxpayers, with the remaining $21 million in investments and other income. The Austin Transit Partnership has estimated it will spend $116 million towards "professional services and administrative costs" with the rest going towards new construction. Of that, $8 million is set aside for the two bus routes, while the remaining cost will go towards environmental impact reviews, as well as overall design.

=== Comments on the 2023–present Israel-Gaza conflict ===
On October 8, 2023, Watson released a statement after the events of October 7 in Israel. In the statement, Watson wrote, "My heart breaks for the people of Israel. I stand with them, and I condemn the terrorist acts." The next day he attended a pro-Israel event, titled "We Stand with Israel" hosted by Shalom Austin and the Israeli-American Council, along with congressman Lloyd Doggett and Texas governor Greg Abbott. Watson spoke at the event, held at the Dell Jewish Community Campus, wearing a yarmulke. A coalition of several religious groups, University of Texas at Austin student groups, and the Palestinian Assembly for Liberation and the Jewish Voice for Peace have asked Watson to issue a statement supporting a ceasefire and the Palestinian people. In a statement responding to the stabbing of Zacharia Doar at a pro-Palestine rally in February 2024, Watson supported the Austin Police Department's determination that it was a hate crime. In the same statement, he pivoted to comment on a proposed resolution by the Austin City Council supporting a ceasefire in Gaza, saying in part of a statement, "The proposed resolution of the Austin City Council will not realistically end the violence on the other side of the globe. Nor will it stop federal taxes from being used to implement U.S. foreign policy. That is not in our power. The resolution, however, has the power to divide Austin — and will."

== Electoral history ==
=== 2024 ===
2024 Austin mayoral election
| Candidate | Votes | % |
|---|---|---|
| Kirk Watson | 175,096 | 50.0041% |
| Carmen Llanes Pulido | 70,550 | 20.14% |
| Kathie Tovo | 58,280 | 16.64% |
| Jeffrey Bowen | 29,383 | 8.39% |
| Doug Greco | 16,865 | 4.82% |

=== 2022 ===
2022 Austin mayoral run-off
| Party | Candidate | Votes | % |
|---|---|---|---|
| Nonpartisan | Kirk Watson | 57,346 | 50.39 |
| Nonpartisan | Celia Israel | 56,460 | 49.61 |
| Total votes | | 113,806 | 100 |

2022 Austin mayoral election
| Party | Candidate | Votes | % |
|---|---|---|---|
| Nonpartisan | Celia Israel | 121,862 | 39.99 |
| Nonpartisan | Kirk Watson | 106,508 | 34.95 |
| Nonpartisan | Jennifer Virden | 56,189 | 18.44 |
| Nonpartisan | Phil Campero Brual | 7,295 | 2.39 |
| Nonpartisan | Anthony Bradshaw | 7,102 | 2.33 |
| Nonpartisan | Gary Spellman | 5,781 | 1.90 |
| Total votes | | 304,737 | 100 |

=== 2018 ===
Texas general election, 2018: Senate District 14
| Party | Candidate | Votes | % | ±% |
|---|---|---|---|---|
| Democratic | Kirk Watson | 276,052 | 71.93 | −8.05 |
| Republican | George W. Hindman | 96,834 | 25.23 | +25.23 |
| Libertarian | Micah M. Verlander | 10,889 | 2.84 | −17.18 |
| Majority | | 179,218 | 54.75 | −5.21 |
| Turnout | | 383,775 | 46.61 | n/a |
| Democratic hold | | | | |

=== 2014 ===
Texas general election, 2014: Senate District 14
| Party | Candidate | Votes | % | ±% |
|---|---|---|---|---|
| Democratic | Kirk Watson | 154,391 | 79.98 | −0.31 |
| Libertarian | James Arthur Strohm | 38,648 | 20.02 | +0.31 |
| Majority | | 115,743 | 59.96 | −0.62 |
| Turnout | | 193,039 | n/a | n/a |
| Democratic hold | | | | |

=== 2012 ===
Texas general election, 2012: Senate District 14
| Party | Candidate | Votes | % | ±% |
|---|---|---|---|---|
| Democratic | Kirk Watson | 212,527 | 80.29 | +19.56 |
| Libertarian | Ryan M. Dixon | 52,187 | 19.71 | +16.10 |
| Majority | | 164,578 | 60.58 | +35.52 |
| Turnout | | 264,714 | n/a | n/a |
| Democratic hold | | | | |

=== 2010 ===
Texas general election, 2010: Senate District 14
| Party | Candidate | Votes | % | ±% |
|---|---|---|---|---|
| Democratic | Kirk Watson | 115,949 | 60.73 | −19.59 |
| Republican | Mary Lou Serafine | 68,100 | 35.67 | +35.67 |
| Libertarian | Kent Phillips | 6,884 | 3.61 | −16.07 |
| Majority | | 47,949 | 25.06 | −35.57 |
| Turnout | | 190,933 | n/a | n/a |
| Democratic hold | | | | |

=== 2006 ===
Texas general election, 2006: Senate District 14
| Party | Candidate | Votes | % | ±% |
|---|---|---|---|---|
| Democratic | Kirk Watson | 127,223 | 80.32 | +27.61 |
| Libertarian | Robert "Rock" Howard | 31,180 | 19.68 | +15.51 |
| Majority | | 96,043 | 60.63 | +51.05 |
| Turnout | | 158,403 | | −12.29 |
| Democratic hold | | | | |

=== 2002 ===
Texas general election, 2002: Texas Attorney General
| Party | Candidate | Votes | % | ±% |
|---|---|---|---|---|
| Republican | Greg Abbott | 2,542,184 | 56.72 | +2.46 |
| Democratic | Kirk Watson | 1,841,359 | 41.08 | −3.1 |
| Libertarian | Jon Roland | 56,880 | 1.26 | −0.3 |
| Green | David Keith Cobb | 41,560 | 0.92 | +0.92 |
| Majority | | 700,825 | 15.63 | |
| Turnout | | 4,481,983 | | |
| Republican hold | | | | |

=== 2000 ===
2000 Austin mayoral election
| Party | Candidate | Votes | % |
|---|---|---|---|
| Nonpartisan | Kirk Watson | 29,777 | 84.03 |
| Nonpartisan | A. Leslie Cochran | 2,755 | 7.77 |
| Nonpartisan | Dale A. Reed | 1,662 | 4.69 |
| Nonpartisan | Jennifer L. Gale | 1,244 | 3.51 |
| Total votes | | 38,166 | 100 |

=== 1997 ===
1997 Austin mayoral election
| Party | Candidate | Votes | % |
|---|---|---|---|
| Nonpartisan | Kirk Watson | 30,278 | 48.47 |
| Nonpartisan | Ronney Reynolds | 24,915 | 39.89 |
| Nonpartisan | Michael "Max" Nofziger | 5,966 | 9.55 |
| Nonpartisan | Jennifer L. Gale | 420 | 0.67 |
| Nonpartisan | Kirk Becker | 361 | 0.57 |
| Nonpartisan | Ray Blanchette | 197 | 0.31 |
| Nonpartisan | Ted Kircher | 165 | 0.26 |
| Nonpartisan | John Johnson | 154 | 0.24 |
| Total votes | | 62,840 | 100 |

A majority is usually required to win a mayoral election in Austin, and if no candidate receives more than 50% in the general election, a winner is usually determined in a runoff election. However, on May 5, 1997, two days after the general election, candidate Ronney Reynolds, a two-term council member, withdrew from the runoff resulting in Watson's election as mayor.

== Personal life ==
Watson is married to Elizabeth Ann "Liz" McDaniel and is the father of two sons.

== Notes ==
Political offices
| Preceded by Bruce Todd | Mayor of Austin; 1997–2001 | Succeeded by Gus Garcia |
| Preceded by Steve Adler | Mayor of Austin; 2023–present | Incumbent |
Party political offices
| Preceded by Jim Mattox | Democratic nominee for Attorney General of Texas; 2002 | Succeeded by David Van Os |
Texas Senate
| Preceded by Robert Nichols | President pro tempore of the Texas Senate; 2019 | Succeeded by Joan Huffman |
