= Blue Mound, Texas =

City of Blue Mound, Texas
- City
- Interactive map of City of Blue Mound, Texas
- Coordinates: 32°51′15″N 97°20′18″W
- Country: United States
- State: Texas
- County: Tarrant

Government
  - Type: Council-Manager

Area
  - Total: 0.51 sq mi (1.31 km^{2})
  - Land: 0.51 sq mi (1.31 km^{2})
  - Water: 0 sq mi (0.00 km^{2})
- Elevation: 666 ft (203 m)

Population (2020)
  - Total: 2,393
  - Density: 4,730/sq mi (1,830/km^{2})
- Time zone: UTC-6 (CST)
  - Summer (DST): UTC-5 (CDT)
- ZIP code: 76131
- Area code: 817
- FIPS code: 48-08860
- GNIS feature ID: 2409869
- Website: https://www.bluemoundtexas.gov/

Blue Mound is a city in Tarrant County, Texas, United States. The population was 2,393 as of the 2020 census.

== History ==
The community's history dates back to the 1920s, when Scottish immigrant John Kennedy established Globe Laboratories, Inc. to produce serum to immunize cattle against blackleg, a disease that affected calves under two years of age. About ten years later, he sold the company to his partner. Kennedy later purchased 400 acres (1.6 km^{2}) of land in an area bordered by East McLeroy Boulevard on the north and FM 156 (Blue Mound Road) to the east. His interest in aircraft led him to create the Globe Aircraft Company. As his operation grew, more and more people began to settle near his plant. The settlement was initially known as Saginaw Park, but later took the name Blue Mound after a nearby hill. During the 1950s, Bell Helicopter used Kennedy's facility to develop its new helicopters, but the company left the facility in 1960. Blue Mound incorporated in 1957 and had a population of 1,253 by the 1960 census. That figure had risen to 1,283 by 1970 and 2,169 in 1980 as the city became a bedroom community for those employed in Fort Worth and the surrounding area. The 1990 census showed a slight decline in population, to 2,133. By 2000, the number of inhabitants had risen to 2,388.

== Geography ==
Blue Mound is located along FM 156 (Blue Mound Road), approximately 8 miles (13 km) north of Fort Worth in north central Tarrant County.

According to the United States Census Bureau, the city has a total area of 0.5 square miles (1.3 km^{2}), all land.

=== Climate ===
The climate in this area is characterized by hot, humid summers and generally mild to cool winters. According to the Köppen Climate Classification system, Blue Mound has a humid subtropical climate, abbreviated "Cfa" on climate maps.

== Demographics ==
Historical population
Census	Pop.	Note	%±
1960	1,253		—
1970	1,283		2.4%
1980	2,169		69.1%
1990	2,133		−1.7%
2000	2,388		12.0%
2010	2,394		0.3%
2020	2,393		0.0%
U.S. Decennial Census; 2020 Census

=== 2020 census ===
As of the 2020 census, Blue Mound had a population of 2,393. The median age was 35.3 years. 27.2% of residents were under the age of 18 and 11.2% of residents were 65 years of age or older. For every 100 females there were 102.6 males, and for every 100 females age 18 and over there were 100.9 males age 18 and over.

100.0% of residents lived in urban areas, while 0% lived in rural areas.

There were 765 households in Blue Mound, of which 43.8% had children under the age of 18 living in them. Of all households, 53.7% were married-couple households, 16.3% were households with a male householder and no spouse or partner present, and 21.4% were households with a female householder and no spouse or partner present. About 16.6% of all households were made up of individuals and 6.4% had someone living alone who was 65 years of age or older.

There were 788 housing units, of which 2.9% were vacant. Among occupied housing units, 73.7% were owner-occupied and 26.3% were renter-occupied. The homeowner vacancy rate was 0.7% and the rental vacancy rate was 4.7%.

Racial composition as of the 2020 census
Race	Percent
White	43.7%
Black or African American	2.8%
American Indian and Alaska Native	1.5%
Asian	0.9%
Native Hawaiian and Other Pacific Islander	0.5%
Some other race	26.6%
Two or more races	24.2%
Hispanic or Latino (of any race)	61.3%

=== 2000 census ===
As of the census of 2000, there were 2,388 people, 779 households, and 614 families residing in the city. The population density was 4,445.8 inhabitants per square mile (1,716.5/km^{2}). There were 790 housing units at an average density of 1,470.8 units per square mile (567.9 units/km^{2}). The racial makeup of the city was 76.72% White, 1.34% African American, 0.88% Native American, 0.42% Asian, 0.38% Pacific Islander, 17.09% from other races, and 3.18% from two or more races. Hispanic or Latino of any race were 30.36% of the population.

There were 779 households, out of which 40.4% had children under the age of 18 living with them, 61.5% were married couples living together, 11.7% had a female householder with no husband present, and 21.1% were non-families. 17.8% of all households were made up of individuals, and 6.0% had someone living alone who was 65 years of age or older. The average household size was 3.07 and the average family size was 3.44.

In the city, the population was spread out, with 31.0% under the age of 18, 9.8% from 18 to 24, 31.2% from 25 to 44, 20.9% from 45 to 64, and 7.2% who were 65 years of age or older. The median age was 32 years. For every 100 females, there were 100.2 males. For every 100 females age 18 and over, there were 94.7 males.

The median income for a household in the city was $45,250, and the median income for a family was $47,011. Males had a median income of $31,898 versus $22,989 for females. The per capita income for the city was $16,553. About 5.9% of families and 7.2% of the population were below the poverty line, including 5.8% of those under age 18 and 15.6% of those age 65 or over.

== Education ==
Public education in the city of Blue Mound is provided by the Eagle Mountain-Saginaw Independent School District. Zoned campuses include Gilliland Elementary School (grades PK–5), which is located in the city of Blue Mound, Highland Middle School (grades 6–8), and Saginaw High School (grades 9–12), which are in the city of Saginaw.
