= Boswell High School =

Coordinates: 32°52′48″N 97°24′48″W

W.E. Boswell High School

Location
- 5805 W Bailey Boswell Road; Fort Worth, Texas 76179; United States

Information
- Type: Public secondary school
- Established: 1962
- School district: Eagle Mountain-Saginaw Independent School District
- Principal: Ryan Wilson
- Teaching staff: 146.05 (FTE)
- Grades: 9–12
- Age range: 14-18
- Enrollment: 2,683 (2023–2024)
- Student to teacher ratio: 18.37
- Colors: Blue, gold, and white
- Mascot: Pioneer
- Website: bhs.emsisd.com

Boswell High School is a public secondary school in Fort Worth, Texas, United States. It is part of the Eagle Mountain-Saginaw Independent School District, and serves students in grades nine through twelve.

== Fine Arts ==
Boswell High School has the following fine arts programs:

- Art
- Band
- Choir
- Dance
- Photography
- Theater

== Athletics ==
Boswell High School has the following athletic programs; they also have athletic trainers:

- Baseball
- Basketball
- Bowling
- Cheer
- Cross country
- Football
- Golf
- Gymnastics
- Powerlifting
- Soccer
- Softball
- Swimming
- Tennis
- Track & Field
- Volleyball
- Wrestling

=== State Titles ===
- Baseball 1997(4A)
- Girls Basketball 2025(6A/D1)

== Notable alumni ==
- Brad Hawpe - Former MLB first baseman
- Angela Stanford - LPGA golfer
- Kirk Watson - State Senator and current Austin mayor
