= Saginaw High School (Texas) =

Coordinates: 32.869036°N 97.344189°W

- Saginaw, Tarrant County, Texas 76131; United States

Information
- Opened: 2005
- School district: Eagle Mountain-Saginaw Independent School District
- Superintendent: Jerry Hollingsworth
- Principal: Ray Blanco
- Teaching staff: 143.89 (on an FTE basis)
- Grades: 9-12
- Enrollment: 2,194 (2022–23)
- Average class size: 25
- Student to teacher ratio: 15.24
- Hours in school day: 8
- Colors: Cardinal and gold
- Sports: Football, baseball, softball, volleyball, basketball, golf, gymnastics, wrestling, swimming, tennis, dance, cheer, cross country and track & field
- Mascot: Rowdy the Rough Rider
- Team name: Rough Riders
- Accreditation: Texas Education Agency
- Website: shs.emsisd.com

Saginaw High School opened in 2005 as the second high school serving the Eagle Mountain-Saginaw Independent School District (EMS-ISD). It is a 5-A school located in Saginaw, Texas, United States. The mascot is the Rough Rider, and the school colors are cardinal red and Vegas gold. Enrollment is approximately 1,800 students.

== Athletics ==
Saginaw High Rough Riders enjoy opportunities to participate in a number of sports, including football, baseball, softball, volleyball, basketball, golf, wrestling, gymnastics, tennis, swimming, cross country, and track & field.

=== Men's gymnastics ===
The men's gymnastics team won the 2012, 2013, 2018 and 2019 State Championships. The 2020 State championships were cancelled because of the COVID-19 pandemic, with Saginaw ranked first in each combined event, and as a team.

== Fine arts ==
=== Spirit of Saginaw Band ===
The Spirit of Saginaw Band was founded in 2005. It began its first marching season with 80 members and participated at the Plano East Marching Festival, earning a Division II at UIL Region. In 2006 the band grew to 130 members and participated in Bands of America, the Plano East Marching Festival and earned a Division I at UIL region. In 2007 the band had 160 members and won its first marching competition of the year, the Golden Triangle Marching Classic, and received its second top-three placement. The color guard and percussion participated in the Crowley Guard & Drumline Competition. The guard placed 1st, with Best Weapon Line and Best Color Guard. Percussion placed second. They tied for first (with the Azle marching band) in the UIL Area A marching competition and received 14th place at the UIL State Marching Championships in San Antonio. In 2008 the band placed 2nd at the Aledo Unleash the Sound Competition (eventually winning this contest in later years), received a Division I at UIL Region and placed 3rd at the USSBA State Championships, including 1st Place Color Guard and 1st Place Percussion. The Guard & Percussion participated again at Crowley, where the guard placed 2nd, 3rd overall and Percussion won a caption for best snare line. Percussion attended PASIC (Percussive Arts Society International Convention) November 5–8 and placed 6th out of 10 bands in their division. The Saginaw Band also received the UIL Sweepstakes Award five consecutive years, beginning in 2008.

Originally a 4A program, the Spirit of Saginaw band was reclassified to 5A as of the 2010–2011 school year.

=== Saginaw High School Theater ===
The school's theatre program was featured in the first season of Encore! on Disney+, where they recreated their 2007 performance of Beauty and the Beast.

=== Starsteppers dance team ===
The award-winning Starsteppers dance team perform at SHS varsity football games, pep rallies, basketball games, community events, competitions and camps.

=== Cheerleader controversy ===
The Fort-Worth Star Telegram reported on April 8, 2010 that a group of cheerleaders from the school were disciplined after spiking their teammates' soda cans with urine. The incident happened during the previous winter when at least one of the cheerleaders urinated into a cup and then mixed its contents with soda bought at a nearby restaurant. At least two girls were given in-school suspensions and others received lesser punishments, according to the Star-Telegram. The girls were barred from cheerleading events for the rest of the school year, but were allowed to return the following year.
