= To Find a Killer =

2023 book by Doug Greco

- Author: Doug Greco
- Language: English
- Subject: Murder of Norma and Maria Hurtado, American LGBT movement
- Genre: True crime, LGBTQ studies, non-fiction
- Publisher: Gaudium Publishing, an imprint of Histria Books
- Publication date: June 6, 2023
- Pages: 136
- ISBN: 9781592112982 (Paperback)

To Find a Killer: The Homophobic Murders of Norma and Maria Hurtado and the LGBT Rights Movement is a 2023 book by Doug Greco. In 2011, Norma and Maria Hurtado, a lesbian woman and her mother, were shot and killed by Jose Aviles in a homophobic hate crime. Greco was a high school teacher to Norma Hurtado in Austin, Texas ten years prior to the killing, and applies his experience as an organizer with groups including Equality California to explore the crime and its context.

The book received generally positive reviews from critics, distinguishing it from much of the true crime genre for its detailed history of LGBT movements in the United States.
