= 2022 Austin mayoral election =

- November 8, 2022 (first round); December 13, 2022 (runoff)
- Turnout: 52.33% ▲ (first round)
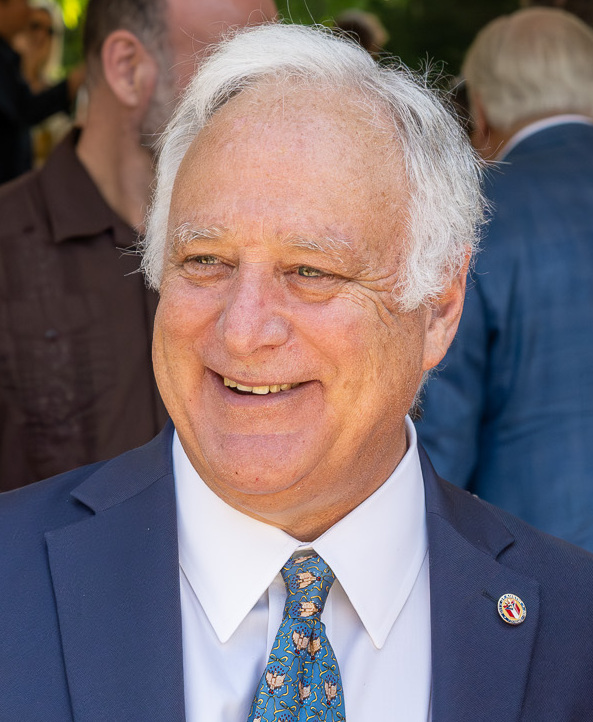

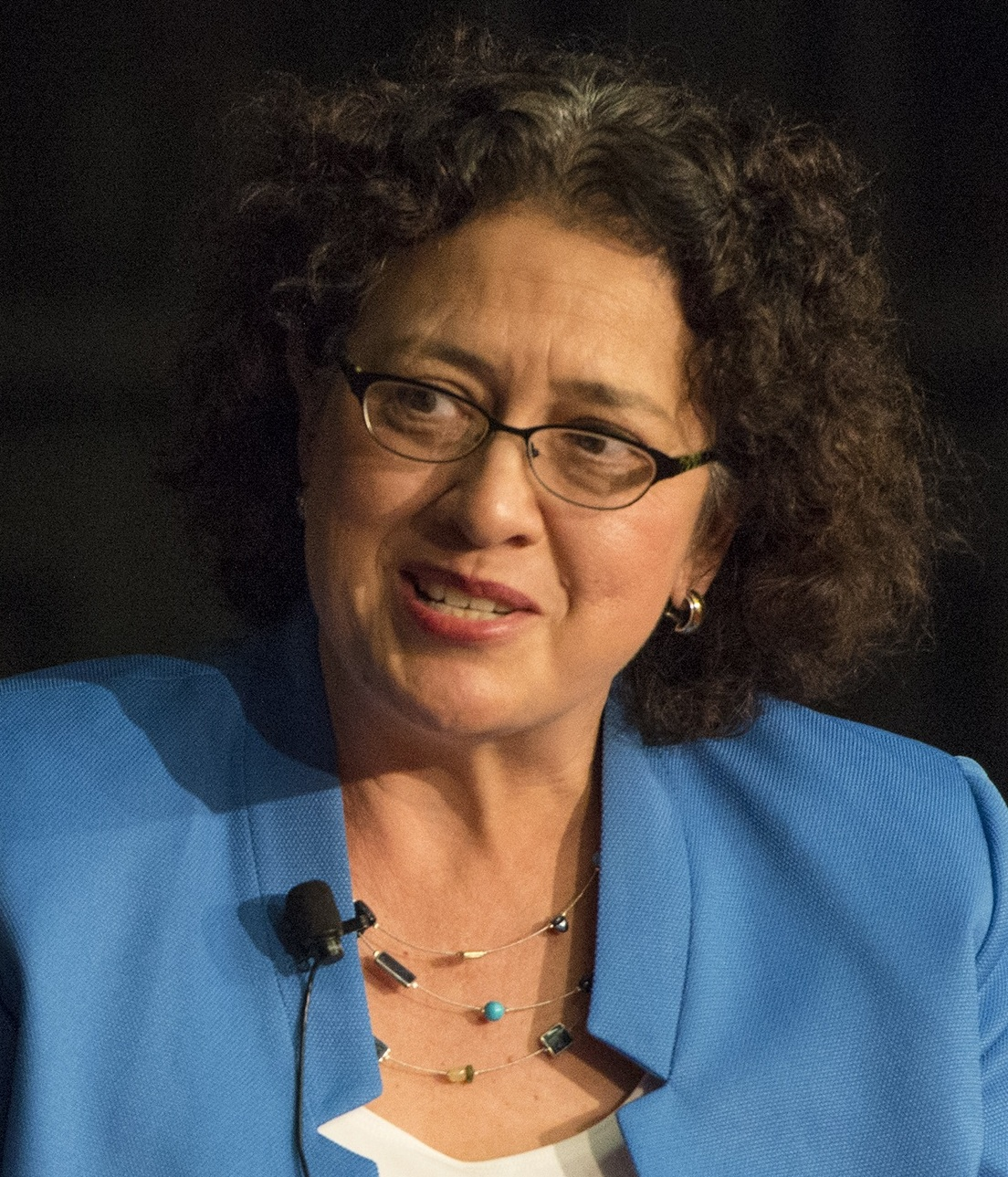

Candidate	Kirk Watson	Celia Israel	Jennifer Virden
First round	106,508; 35.0%	121,862; 40.0%	56,189; 18.4%
Runoff	57,565; 50.4%	56,623; 49.6%	Eliminated
- Precinct results Watson: 30–40% 40–50% 50–60% 60–70% 70–80% 80-90% >90% Israel: 30–40% 40–50% 50–60% 60–70% 70–80% 80-90% >90% No votes Virden: 30–40% 40–50% 50–60% >90% No votes
Mayor before election
Steve Adler
Elected mayor
Kirk Watson

The 2022 Austin mayoral election was held on November 8, 2022, to elect the next mayor of Austin, Texas. The election was nonpartisan; candidates' party affiliations did not appear on the ballot. Incumbent mayor Steve Adler was term-limited and could not run for re-election. In the general election, state representative Celia Israel and former mayor Kirk Watson took the first two spots, leading realtor Jennifer Virden and several other candidates. Because no candidate received more than 50% of the vote, the race proceeded to a runoff election between Israel and Watson on December 13, which Watson won by 924 votes.

Due to the passage of Proposition D in 2021, which scheduled mayoral elections in Austin to coincide with presidential elections, the winner of this election served a shortened two-year term.

The election occurred concurrently with district city council races.

== Background ==
Though the election was officially nonpartisan, the runoff candidates, Celia Israel and Kirk Watson, were both affiliated with the Democratic Party. Jennifer Virden, who was third place, had a reputation of being conservative.

Steven Pedigo, director of UT's LBJ Urban Lab, indicated that Watson's support was centralized with longtime residences of Austin in areas like the Northwest, and Israel's support was with younger demographics in growing and gentrifying areas of South and East Austin. According to Axios, Watson likely benefitted by the absence of Beto O'Rourke, who drew out younger and more progressive voters, from appearing on the runoff ballot. Furthermore, voters who supported more conservative Virden were more inclined to opt for Watson in the runoff.

== Candidates ==
=== Declared ===
- Craig Blanchard, business owner (party affiliation: Democratic)
- Anthony Bradshaw, security guard
- Phil Campero Brual, Legislative intern and University of Texas at Austin government student
- Celia Israel, state representative from the 50th district (party affiliation: Democratic)
- Gary Spellman, business owner
- Jennifer Virden, business owner and realtor
- Kirk Watson, former president pro tempore of the Texas Senate from the 14th district and former mayor (party affiliation: Democratic)

=== Withdrew ===
- Erica Nix, fitness instructor, performance artist, and LGBT activist (endorsed Israel)

=== Declined ===
- Greg Casar, city councilor (ran for U.S. House)
- Adam Loewy, attorney
- Kathie Tovo, city councilor

== Endorsements ==
Celia Israel

U.S. Representatives

- Joaquin Castro, U.S. Representative from TX-20

State legislators

- Vikki Goodwin, state representative from the 47th district
- Donna Howard, state representative from the 48th district
- John Bucy, state representative from the 136th district
- Lulu Flores, state representative-elect from the 51st district

Local officials

- Dana Debeauvoir, former Travis County Clerk
- Delia Garza, Travis County Attorney
- Natasha Harper-Madison Austin City Councillor, District 1
- Vanessa Fuentes, Austin City Councillor, District 2
- José "Chito" Vela, Austin City Councillor, District 4
- Jimmy Flannigan, former Austin City Councillor, District 6
- Chris Riley, former Austin City Councillor, At-Large

Organizations

- AURA: An Austin for Everyone
- Circle C Democrats
- EMILY's List
- Jolt Action
- Latino Victory Fund
- LGBTQ Victory Fund
- LPAC
- Northeast Travis County Democrats
- Stonewall Democrats of Austin
- Texas College Democrats
- University Democrats
- Williamson County Democrats

Newspapers

- Austin-American Statesman
- The Austin Chronicle
- Hyde Parker Magazine
Kirk Watson

State legislators

- Sheryl Cole, state Representative from the 46th district
- Wendy Davis, former state Senator from the 10th district and 2014 Democratic nominee for Governor of Texas

Local officials

- Andy Brown, Travis County Judge
- Jeff Travillion, Travis County Commissioner
- Brigid Shea, Travis County Commissioner
- Ann Howard, Travis County Commissioner
- Sally Hernandez, Travis County Sheriff
- Pio Renteria, Austin City Councillor, District 3
- Ann Kitchen, Austin City Councillor, District 5
- Leslie Pool, Austin City Councillor, District 7
- Alison Alter, Austin City Councillor, District 10

Labor Unions

- AFSCME, Local 1624
- Austin Central Labor Council
- Austin EMS Association
- Austin Firefighter's Association
- Workers Defense Action Fund

Organizations

- Austin Board of Realtors
- Black Austin Democrats
- Central Austin Democrats
- Real Estate Council of Austin (RECA)
Jennifer Virden

Municipal officials

- Lee Leffingwell, former mayor of Austin (2009–2015)
- Ron Mullen, former mayor of Austin (1983–1985)
Declined to endorse
- Steve Adler, mayor of Austin

=== Debates ===
==== First round ====
A candidate forum was held on October 28 in the Lyndon Baines Johnson Presidential Library.

No.	Date	Host	Moderator	Link	Nonpartisan	Nonpartisan	Nonpartisan	Nonpartisan	Nonpartisan	Nonpartisan
Key: P Participant A Absent N Not invited I Invited W Withdrawn										
Key: P Participant A Absent N Not invited I Invited W Withdrawn					Anthony Bradshaw	Phil Brual	Celia Israel	Gary Spellman	Jennifer Virden	Kirk Watson
1	Oct. 5, 2022	Austin Monitor; KUT		YouTube	P	P	P	P	P	P
2	Oct. 12, 2022	Austin PBS	Sonta Henderson	YouTube	A	P	P	A	A	P
3	Oct. 18, 2022	Austin American-Statesman; KVUE	Ashley Goudeau; Ryan Autullo	YouTube	P	P	P	P	P	P

==== Runoff ====
No.	Date	Host	Moderator	Link	Nonpartisan	Nonpartisan
Key: P Participant A Absent N Not invited I Invited W Withdrawn						
Key: P Participant A Absent N Not invited I Invited W Withdrawn					Celia Israel	Kirk Watson
1	Dec. 1, 2022	KXAN-TV	Daniel Marin; Britt Moreno	YouTube	P	P
2	Dec. 5, 2022	KVUE	Ashley Goudeau	KVUE	P	P

== Results ==
2022 Austin mayoral general election
Candidate	Votes	%
Celia Israel	121,862	39.99%
Kirk Watson	106,508	34.95%
Jennifer Virden	56,189	18.44%
Phil Campero Brual	7,295	2.39%
Anthony Bradshaw	7,102	2.33%
Gary Spellman	5,781	1.90%
Turnout		%

2022 Austin mayoral runoff
Candidate	Votes	%
Kirk Watson	57,565	50.4%
Celia Israel	56,623	49.6%
Turnout		%
