= Jason Cohen =

American lawyer

- Born: Jason Cohen; New Jersey, United States
- Education: Brandeis University; Rutgers School of Law
- Occupation: General Counsel
- Employer: Dallas Cowboys
- Board member of: Baylor Scott & White Charles A. Sammons Cancer Center

Jason Cohen is an American lawyer and sports executive, he currently serves as General Counsel for the Dallas Cowboys in the National Football League and Jerry Jones Family Office. He previously held in-house legal positions with the Oakland Raiders and Minnesota Vikings, and also worked for NASCAR and Women’s Professional Soccer (WPS).

== Early life and education ==
Cohen was born and raised in New Jersey. After graduating from Brandeis University with a double major in history and American studies, he volunteered for a United Nations programme, Right to Play. It used used sports to teach life skills to children globally, with Cohen living in Zambia for 6 months as part of the refugee effort.

When he returned to the United States, he studied at Rutgers School of Law, graduating with his Juris Doctor.

== Career ==
Cohen began his career in the legal profession with an internship at the Oakland Raiders. After the Wilf family purchased the Minnesota Vikings, Cohen pursued a role with the team. Both he and the Wilfs are originally from the same hometown in New Jersey. After spending time in business and legal positions with the Vikings, Cohen relocated to San Francisco and took up a similar role with Women’s Professional Soccer, helping launch the league.

In 2013, Cohen was headhunted by the Dallas Cowboys to serve as General Counsel. He became a major part of the franchise over the next few years, working on the AT&T sponsorship deal for the Dallas stadium in Arlington. In doing so, it became one of the most valuable sports stadium sponsorship deals at the time. Cohen also handles security and compliance for the organization.

Shortly after Cohen joined the Cowboys, the team broke ground on The Star in Frisco, a $1.5 billion sports and entertainment complex where one of his primary responsibilities was overseeing the project’s legal requirements. In 2022, in response to the Colleyville hostage situation, Cohen and Brad Sham launched an educational programming on antisemitism as part of the team’s diversity and inclusion efforts. In 2024, the NFL announced Jeffrey Pash would be retiring from his role of General Counsel. Bloomberg reported Cohen was among the candidates considered for the NFL’s general counsel position.

In 2026, the Cowboys extended their lease at Arlington, keeping the Cowboys in the city until at least 2055. Cohen was a major broker for the Cowboys in the deal.

Cohen is also a currently Chairman of the Board at Baylor Scott & White Charles A. Sammons Cancer Center in Texas. He also serves as an adjuct law professor at Southern Methodist University’s Dedman School of Law.
