= Mark Strama =

American politician

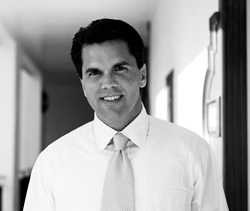

Member of the Texas House of Representatives from the 50th district
- In office January 11, 2005 – June 25, 2013
- Preceded by: Jack Stick
- Succeeded by: Celia Israel

Personal details
- Born: September 10, 1967 (age 59) Dallas, Texas, U.S.
- Party: Democratic
- Spouse: Crystal Cotti
- Education: Brown University (BA)
- Profession: Businessman

Thomas Mark Strama (born September 10, 1967) is an American businessman and politician who is the Director of the Annette Strauss Institute and a professor in the Moody College of Communication at the University of Texas at Austin. A member of the Democratic Party, Strama represented the 50th district in the Texas House of Representatives from 2005 to 2013.

He served as chairman of the House Committee on Technology, Economic Development & Workforce and on the House Committee on Energy Resources. Regarded by many as a rising star in the Democratic Party, he stunned the political world when he resigned from his seat in the Texas House to become the head of Google Fiber in Austin. Strama was also a major factor in the success of the world's only major public election ever held on the internet, the 2000 Arizona Democratic Primary.

== Early life, education, and career ==
Strama was born in Dallas, Texas, to Thomas and Brenda Victoria Trabulsi. He has one brother, Richard Keith Strama. He graduated in 1986 from Memorial High School in Hedwig Village near Houston. He earned an undergraduate degree in 1990 in both political science and philosophy from Brown University in Providence, Rhode Island.

== Early political efforts ==
After his graduation from Brown, Strama worked for the Ann Richards 1990 gubernatorial campaign against Clayton W. Williams Jr. He then worked as chief of staff to State Senator Rodney Ellis. During Strama's tenure, the magazine Texas Monthly named Senator Ellis one of the state's ten best legislators. In 1995, Strama began work on Rock the Vote which is credited with helping over one million people register to vote.

== Private sector ==
Strama returned to Austin to found NewVoter.com, the first company to register voters online. Working to bring the economy, efficiency, and convenience of new technology to the democratic process, Strama's company was acquired by New York-based Election.com in 2000, and helped over 700,000 Americans register to vote online in the 2000 election cycle. Strama was also considered a major factor in the success of the Arizona Democratic Party conducting their 2000 Presidential Primary over the internet He currently holds the franchise rights to the Sylvan Learning Centers in the Austin area.

== Campaign Academy Program ==
In 2004, Strama created a program to involve college students in politics. The Campaign Academy allows them to work for his campaign and in turn, Strama invites speakers to give their insights on politics to the participants. In 2008, the Campaign Academy was opened up to people of all ages, including a 10-year-old and a 50-year-old, among many high school and college students. Speakers at the Campaign Academy have included former Democratic National Chairman Howard Dean, Christine Pelosi, Admiral Bob Inman, Garry Mauro, and U.S. Representative Lloyd Doggett.

== Google ==
By 2013 there was some speculation that Strama might run for the United States Senate or Mayor of Austin. However, he unexpectedly announced that he was leaving politics to join Google. Mark spent ten years at Google working to upgrade internet quality in the United States.

== University of Texas ==
Mark Strama is Director of the Annette Strauss Institute for Civic Life, and a Professor of Practice in the Department of Communication and Media Studies in the Moody College of Communication at the University of Texas. He also co-teaches Pathways to Civic Engagement in UT’s Plan II Honors program, alongside Professor Lee Walker.

== Personal life ==
Strama speaks Spanish fluently. He married Austin television reporter Crystal Cotti soon after his 2004 election to office. Their first child, Victoria Rose Strama, was born in January 2007. They have since had two more daughters. He is also Chairman of the Board for United Way of Greater Austin.

== Texas Ten Best Legislators ==
During his five in the Texas state legislature, Texas Monthly magazine named Strama to its list of Texas's ten best legislators three times. He was widely respected.
