= Celia Israel =

American politician (born 1964)

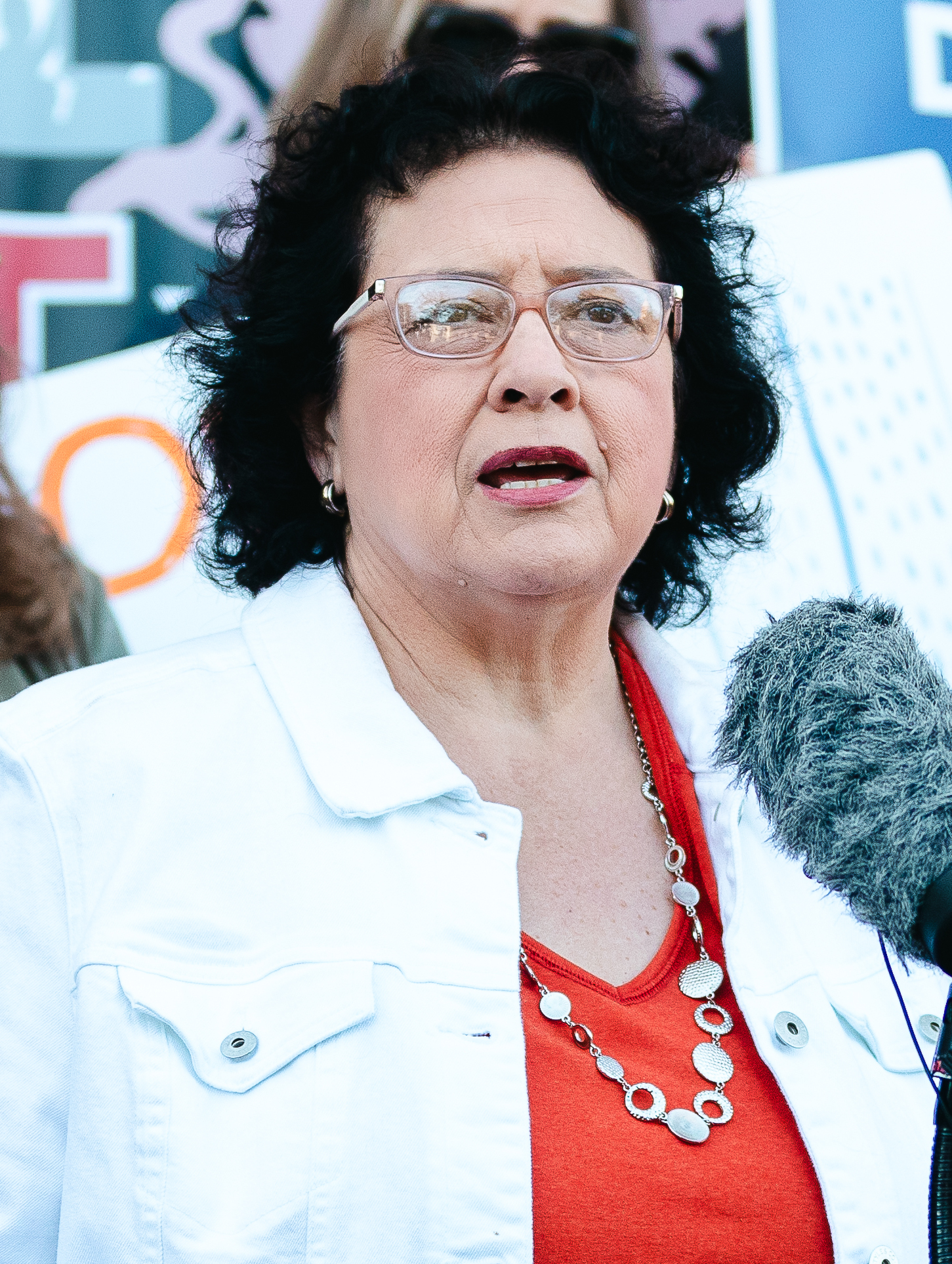
- Israel in 2024

Travis County Tax Assessor-Collector
- Incumbent
- Assumed office January 3, 2025
- Preceded by: Bruce Elfant

Member of the Texas House of Representatives from the 50th district
- In office February 12, 2014 – January 10, 2023
- Preceded by: Mark Strama
- Succeeded by: James Talarico

Personal details
- Born: July 15, 1964 (age 62)
- Party: Democratic
- Education: University of Texas, Austin (BA)
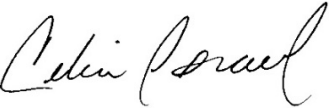
- Signature

Celia Marie Israel (born July 15, 1964) is an American politician serving as Travis County's Tax Assessor-Collector since 2025. A member of the Democratic Party, she served in the Texas House of Representatives from 2014 to 2023.

== Early life and career ==
Israel was raised in El Paso, Texas. She moved to the Austin area in 1982 to attend the University of Texas at Austin. After graduating with a degree in government, she served in Governor Ann Richards' administration. Israel is a licensed Texas realtor.

== Political career ==
Israel won a special election on January 28, 2014, to represent the 50th district in the Texas House of Representatives to succeed Mark Strama.

Israel was a member of the Legislative Study Group, the Women's Health Caucus, the Mexican American Legislative Caucus, and was a founding member of the Texas House LGBTQ Caucus. She previously served as Vice Chair of the Texas House Democratic Caucus, overseeing the Steering and Policy Committee. She proposed legislation to introduce online voter registration in Texas. In September 2019, she was chosen to lead the Texas House Democratic Campaign Committee, a political action committee tasked with electing more Democrats to the Texas House.

Israel served on numerous boards and committees focused on multimodal transportation, food scarcity, and empowering the next generation of female leaders. During her first term in the legislature, she was named Freshman of the Year by the Legislative Study Group, a Champion of Equality by Equality Texas, and a Progressive Champion by Progress Texas. In 2018, Israel was inducted into the Austin Women's Hall of Fame.

In January 2022, Israel announced that she would run for mayor of Austin in the 2022 Austin mayoral election. In the November 8 general election, she advanced to a runoff election against Kirk Watson and subsequently lost by a narrow margin.

In June 2023, Israel announced a campaign for Travis County Tax Assessor-Collector, following the retirement of longtime incumbent Bruce Elfant. She drew no opponents in either the primary or general elections, and assumed office on January 3, 2025.

== Personal life ==
Israel lives with her wife, Celinda Garza, and their dogs, Pippa and Libby, in northeastern Travis County.
