= Texas Commission on Environmental Quality =

Environmental agency of the state of Texas

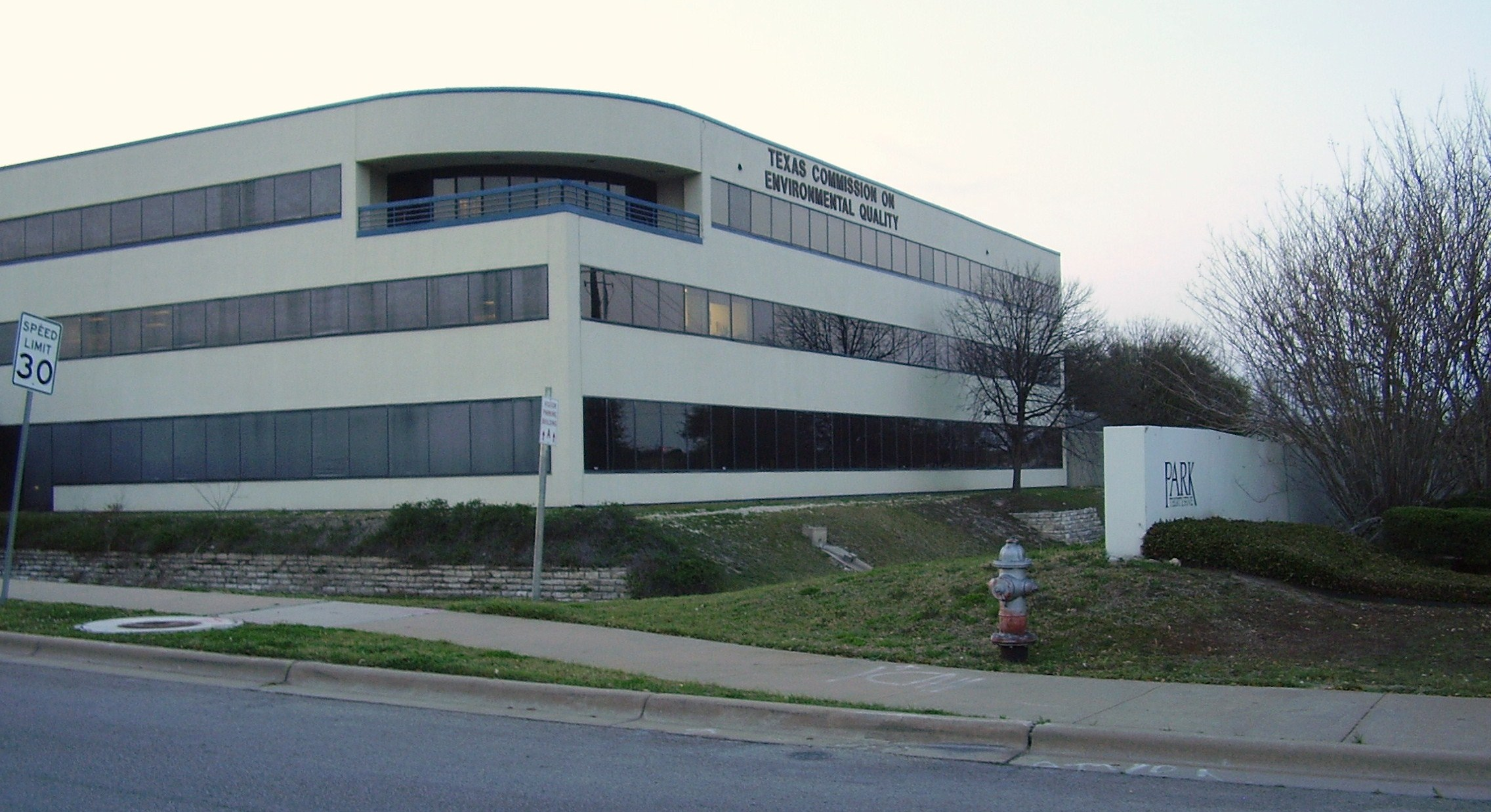
- Headquarters in Austin, Texas

Commission overview
- Formed: 1991; 35 years ago
- Jurisdiction: State of Texas
- Headquarters: Austin, Texas
- Employees: 2,780
- Annual budget: $420 million USD (2016)
- Website: Official website

The Texas Commission on Environmental Quality (TCEQ) is the environmental agency for the state of Texas. The commission's headquarters are located at 12100 Park 35 Circle in Austin. The fourth-largest environmental agency in the United States (and the third-largest state environmental agency, behind the US Environmental Protection Agency, the California EPA, and the New York DEC), it employs about 2,780 employees, has 16 regional offices, and has a $420 million operating budget for the 2016 fiscal year.

== History ==
=== Creation ===
The history of natural resource protection by the State of Texas is one of gradual evolution from protecting the right of access to natural resources (principally surface water) to a broader role in protecting public health and conserving natural resources for future generations of Texans.

At the start of the 20th century, Texas created natural resource programs to address concerns about water management and water rights. By the mid-20th century, these efforts expanded to include the protection of air and water quality, and later, the regulation of hazardous and nonhazardous waste.

During the 1990s, the Texas Legislature moved to make natural-resource protection more efficient by consolidating programs. In 1991, it combined the Texas Water Commission and the Texas Air Control Board to create the first version of the TCEQ, known as the Texas Natural Resource Conservation Commission until fall 1993. Sunset legislation passed by the Texas Legislature in 2001 changed the agency's name to the Texas Commission on Environmental Quality and continued the agency until 2013. During the special session of the 81st Legislature (2009), legislation was adopted amending the 2013 date to 2011, when the agency was continued for an additional 12 years and subject to review in 2023.

=== Probe into Hurricane Harvey air monitoring ===
In 2017, the TCEQ had around 500 people assisting in the response to Hurricane Harvey. During and long after the event, the agency kept the public informed by posting air-monitoring data in near real time, status of public water systems, and other information on its Hurricane Harvey webpage. In March 2019, the Los Angeles Times reported that TCEQ and the Environmental Protection Agency (EPA) had refused NASA's offer to collect air-pollution data in Harvey's aftermath, wherein NASA would have flown a DC-8 over Houston to identify up to 450 chemical compounds. Michael Honeycutt of the TCEQ and EPA responded to the press that the TCEQ's ground-level analysis, "which found few problem areas," was the best approach. The TCEQ argued that the NASA data would have been too high in the air to be relevant to people on the ground, and would have overlapped with their own data and been "confusing" or conflicting. The decision resulted in controversy, with opponents arguing the extra data would have been a boon for research and assessing public threats. On March 7, 2019, Congressional Democrats launched a probe into the refusal. The TCEQ posted a letter it received from the U.S. House Committee on Science, Space, and Technology, and its response, on its Harvey webpage.

=== Ethylene oxide ===
After the Environmental Protection Agency released a report in 2016 on the dangers of ethylene oxide, the TCEQ conducted its own review of the EPA report and concluded that people could safely inhale ethylene oxide at concentrations thousands of times higher than the EPA had concluded. The TCEQ disputed that there was sufficient evidence linking ethylene oxide to breast cancer. Scientists criticized the TCEQ conclusion, saying that the TCEQ omitted studies that linked the chemical to breast cancer and that they used a flawed analysis on the EPA report to draw erroneous conclusions.

Texas is the top ethylene oxide polluter in the United States. Its home to 26 facilities that emit the chemical.

=== Water pollution ===
According to a 2022 report by the nonprofit Environment America, Texas ranked first among American states in toxic discharges into streams, rivers and lakes. The nonprofit attributed this to the lax regulatory environment in Texas. TCEQ defended its track record, saying it worked "to ensure safe and effective management of pollutants that may enter Texas surface waters."

=== "Upset" events ===
Under federal law, companies may have "unintentional and temporary noncompliance" with pollution standards if it is "because of factors beyond the reasonable control of the Industrial User." These instances have been described as "upset" events. It falls to state regulators to scrutinize reported upset emissions. A 2023 report by the Environmental Integrity Project found that there are thousands of reports of "upset" event incidents in Texas, but that the TCEQ only took some enforcement action in one half of one percent of cases.

== Commissioners ==
The TCEQ has three full-time commissioners, who are appointed by the governor, to establish overall agency direction and policy, and to make final determinations on contested permitting and enforcement matters. The commissioners are appointed for six-year terms with the advice and consent of the Texas Senate. A commissioner may not serve more than two six-year terms, and the terms are staggered so that a different member's term expires every two years. The governor also names the chairman of the commission. The current commissioners of the TCEQ are Brooke Paup (chairwoman), Catarina Gonzales, and Tonya Miller.

== Mission statement ==
"The Texas Commission on Environmental Quality strives to protect our state's public health and natural resources consistent with sustainable economic development. Our goal is clean air, clean water, and the safe management of waste."

== Divisions and programs ==
=== Office of Air ===
The Office of Air oversees all air-permitting activities. The office also implements plans to protect and restore air quality in cooperation with local, regional, state, and federal stakeholders. It tracks progress toward environmental goals, adapting plans as necessary.

The Air Quality Division works to protect and restore air quality through four programs: Air Implementation Grants, Air Industrial Emissions Assessment, Air Modeling and Data Analysis, and Air Quality Planning. The Air Permits Division processes air permits and authorizations for facilities that, when operational, would emit contaminants into the atmosphere. The division does this through two major air-permitting programs, New Source Review permits and Title V federal operating permits.

=== Office of Water ===
The Office of Water oversees all aspects of planning, permitting, and monitoring to protect the state's water resources. The Office of Water is responsible for the implementation of major programs such as public drinking water, groundwater protection, and surface water quality monitoring.

=== Office of Waste ===
The office implements federal and state laws related to the regulation of aboveground and underground petroleum storage tanks, generation, treatment, storage, and disposal of municipal, industrial, low-level radioactive, and hazardous wastes, and the recovery and processing of uranium and disposal of byproduct. It also oversees state cleanup of contaminated sites.

In the summer of 2016, Texas State Representative John Lujan called upon the commission to clean up a large used-tire dump located in his San Antonio House district. The abandoned tires often contain mosquitoes, flies, snakes, and small animals, and is difficult to spray with insecticides. Lujan first visited the site years earlier when he was a firefighter; he concluded that conditions have worsened and that the site is a fire hazard, and he implored action by the state.

=== Office of Compliance and Enforcement ===
The Office of Compliance and Enforcement enforces compliance with the state's environmental laws, responds to emergencies and natural disasters that threaten human health and the environment, oversees dam safety, and monitors air quality within Texas. In addition, the office oversees the operations of 16 regional offices and one special-project office across the state.

Air samples are collected statewide and sent for analysis to TCEQ's Air Laboratory in Austin. Additionally, the agency has deployed Mobile Monitoring Vans with weather monitoring equipment and other instrumentation for emergencies as well as routine data gathering.

=== Take Care of Texas ===
TCEQ spearheads Take Care of Texas, a personal-responsibility campaign to help Texans decrease their impact on the environment. In 2018, country recording artist Cody Johnson teamed up with the agency to produce a public service announcement that encourages protection of the state's natural resources.

== See also ==
- Climate change in Texas
