= Chisholm Trail High School =

Coordinates: 32.8377°N 97.3936°W

Location
- 3100 NW College Drive; Fort Worth, Texas 76179; United States

Information
- School type: Public high school
- Motto: "Rangers Ride!"
- Established: 2012
- School district: Eagle Mountain-Saginaw Independent School District
- Principal: Mrs. Jennifer Stark
- Staff: 153.83 (FTE)
- Grades: 9-12
- Enrollment: 2,493 (2022–2023)
- Student to teacher ratio: 16.21
- Colors: Purple and gold
- Athletics: Trail Athletics
- Athletics conference: UIL Class 5A
- Mascot: Ranger
- Website: Chisholm Trail High School

Chisholm Trail High School is a public high school in Fort Worth, Texas. It is administered by the Eagle Mountain-Saginaw Independent School District and classified as a 5A school (as of the 2024-2025 school year) by the UIL. The school opened in August 2012 with 938 freshmen and sophomores, and expanded to grades nine through twelve by the 2014–15 school year.

The school takes its name from the historic Chisholm Trail cattle drive route, which passed through Fort Worth.

== Athletics ==
The school won its first football homecoming game on August 26, 2021 with a score of 46-0 and ended the season with a record of 4-6

Chisholm Trail had its first winning season in school history during the 2024-2025 season under Coach Ricklan Holmes. Adding on its first playoff appearance as well, finishing the season 7-4.

== Feeder Schools ==
The students that feed into Chisholm Trail isn't entirely based on the middle schools they attended, but rather the zone they occupy. In general (As of March 2026), all students from Ed Willkie Middle School, and most students from Marine Creek Middle School.
