= Eagle Mountain High School =

Location
- 3451 W. Bonds Ranch Road; Fort Worth, Texas 76179; United States; 32.92193°N 97.43562°W

Information
- School type: State school, High school
- Opened: August 2024
- School district: Eagle Mountain-Saginaw Independent School District
- Grades: 9–12
- Colors: Black and old gold
- Athletics conference: UIL Class 5A
- Mascot: Knights
- Website: emhs.emsisd.com

Eagle Mountain High School is a public high school in the Eagle Mountain-Saginaw Independent School District. The school is located in Fort Worth, Texas and opened in August 2024. In 2025, their volleyball team won the state championship.

== History ==
Eagle Mountain High School (EMHS) was funded by a 2017 US$524,700,000 bond measure and cost the district US$271,000,000. The funding for EMHS was nearly a third less than what it cost and replaced the district's plans to replace Wayside Middle School. The district said the increased cost was due to inflation during the COVID-19 pandemic. The ground breaking ceremony took place in April 2022. It was compared to a college campus when it opened in August 2024. In its inaugural year, it opened to grades 9–11 and 850 students, adding grade 12 in the 2025–2026 school year.

== Campus ==
The campus runs on geothermal energy and a 37,000,000 U.S. gallons (140,000,000 L) pond is used for landscape irrigation. It features a skybridge. Designed by VLK Architects, the campus includes 630,000 square feet (59,000 m^{2}) of learning environment.

== Athletics ==
Eagle Mountain won the UIL Class 4A Division II state volleyball championship in 2025. They were the first school in the Fort Worth area to play in a state championship since 1977.
