= Brad Hawpe =

American baseball player (born 1979)

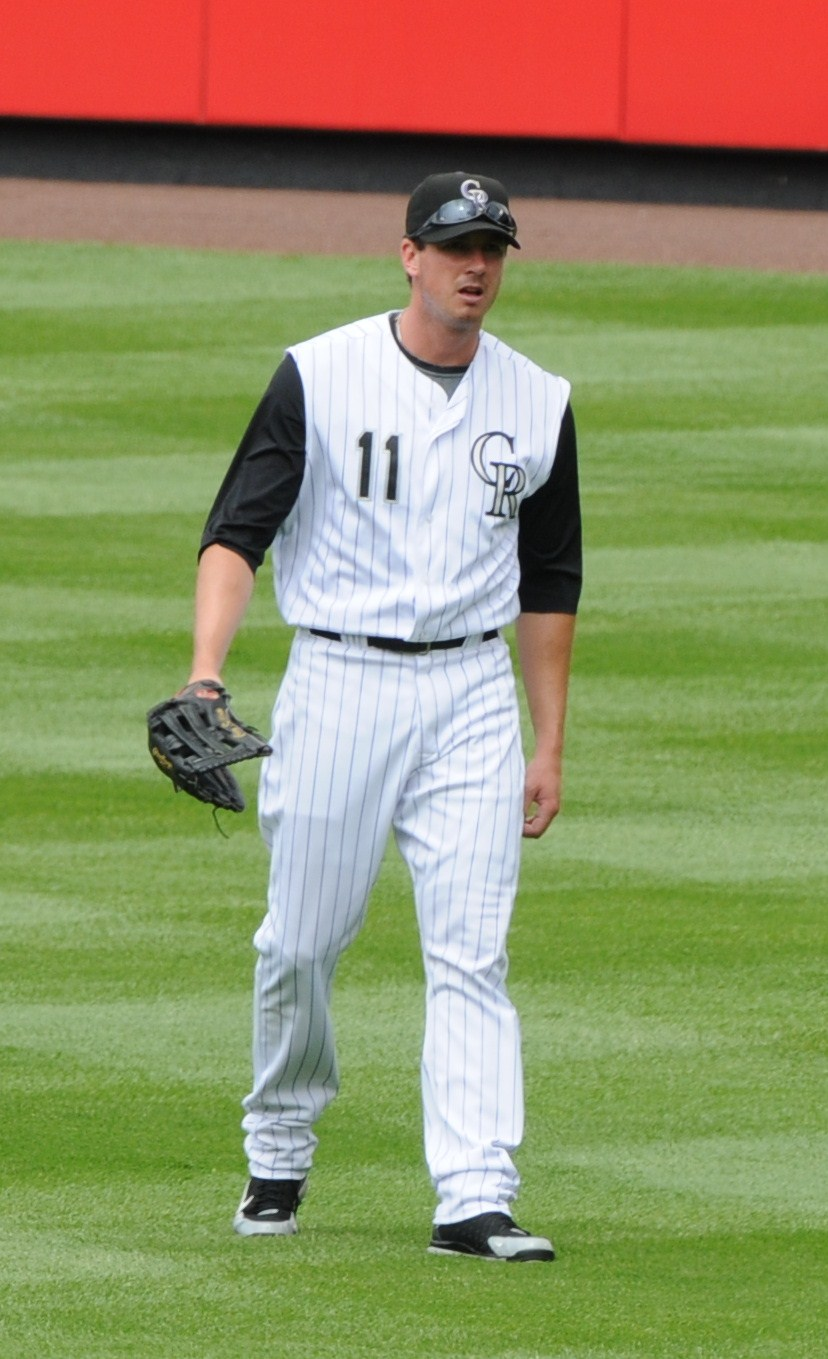
- Hawpe with the Colorado Rockies
- Right fielder
- Born: June 22, 1979 (age 46); Fort Worth, Texas, U.S.
- Batted: Left Threw: Left

MLB debut
- May 1, 2004, for the Colorado Rockies

Last MLB appearance
- July 22, 2013, for the Los Angeles Angels of Anaheim

MLB statistics
- Batting average: .275
- Home Runs: 124
- Runs batted in: 492
- Stats at Baseball Reference

Teams
- Colorado Rockies (2004–2010); Tampa Bay Rays (2010); San Diego Padres (2011); Los Angeles Angels of Anaheim (2013)

Career highlights and awards
- All-Star (2009)

Bradley Bonte Hawpe (born June 22, 1979) is an American former professional baseball outfielder. Hawpe played in Major League Baseball (MLB) for the Colorado Rockies, Tampa Bay Rays, San Diego Padres and Los Angeles Angels of Anaheim. Before he became a professional, Hawpe attended Louisiana State University (LSU), where he played college baseball for the LSU Tigers.

== High school and college ==
Hawpe went to Boswell High School in Fort Worth, Texas, where he played first base and pitched under head coach David Hatcher. He also won a Texas 4A State Championship.

Hawpe attended Louisiana State University in Baton Rouge, Louisiana. He was a member of the LSU Tigers baseball team that won the 2000 College World Series. In 1999, he played collegiate summer baseball in the Cape Cod Baseball League for the Yarmouth-Dennis Red Sox.

== Professional career ==
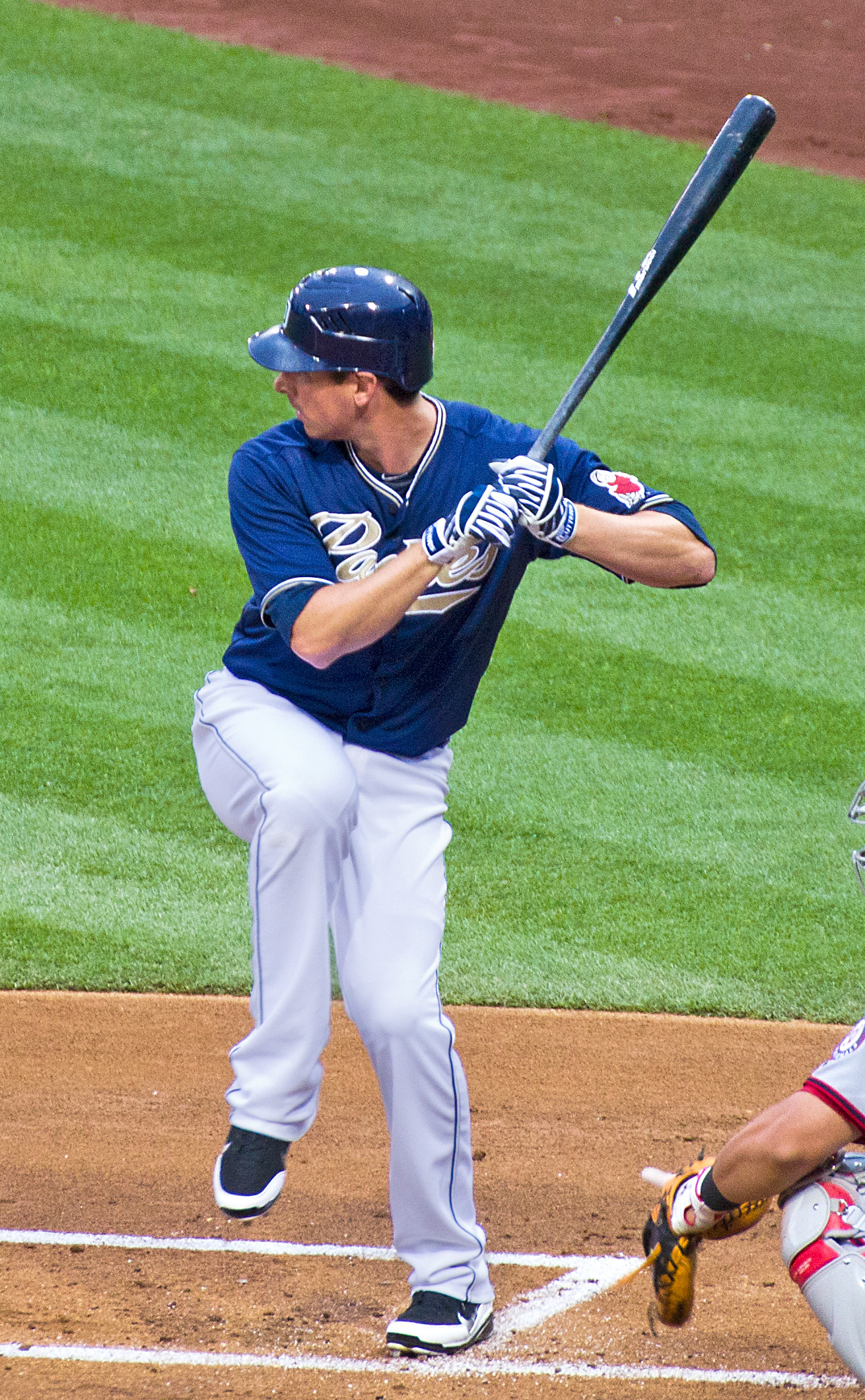
Hawpe with the San Diego Padres in 2011

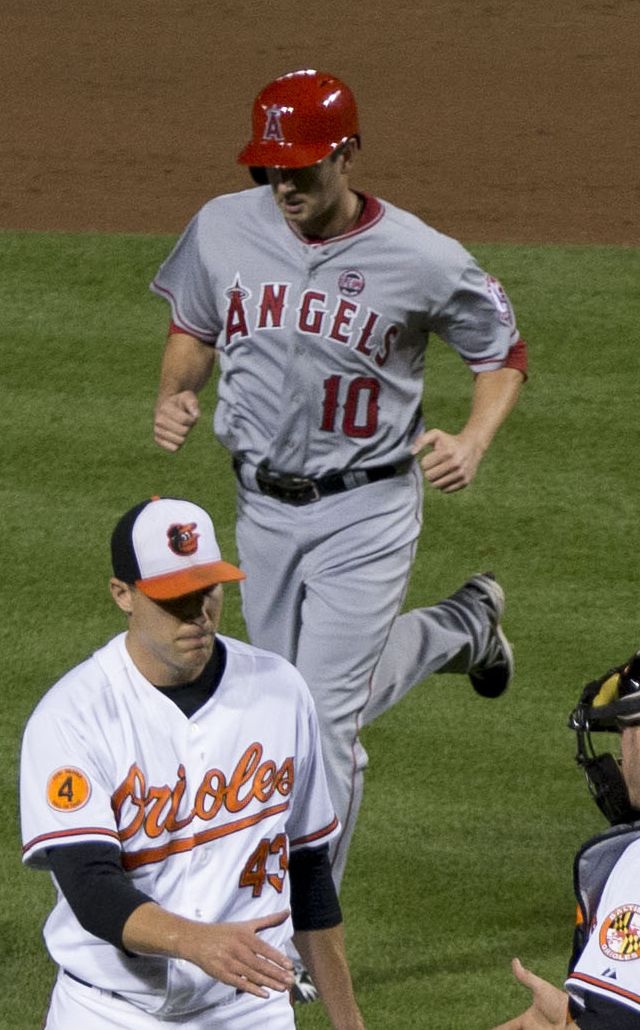
Hawpe with the Los Angeles Angels of Anaheim

Hawpe was drafted by the Toronto Blue Jays in the 46th round of the 1997 Major League Baseball draft; however, he did not sign. Hawpe re-entered the MLB draft in 2000, where he was drafted by the Colorado Rockies in the 11th round; he subsequently signed with the team in June of that year.

In the minor leagues, Hawpe was named to All-Star teams in 2000 while playing in the Northwest League and in 2003 while playing in the Texas League. He was the 2002 Carolina League Most Valuable Player.

Hawpe played first base in the Rockies' minor league system, but moved to right field upon his promotion to the major leagues, as the Rockies had Todd Helton at first base. Hawpe made his major league debut on May 1, 2004. He played in 42 games during the 2004 season.

After getting a chance to become a regular in 2005, playing 101 games, Hawpe had a .262 batting average with 9 home runs and 47 RBIs. In 2006, Hawpe hit .293 with 22 home runs and 84 RBIs. He also led all MLB right fielders in assists (16) and all National League right fielders in fielding percentage (.987). In 2007, he hit .291 with 29 home runs and 116 RBIs. Defensively, though, he had the lowest range factor (1.83) of all NL right fielders.

He missed time in 2008 with a hamstring injury, but still managed to hit .283 with 25 home runs and 85 RBIs. Defensively, however, Hawpe had the lowest fielding percentage (.956) and range factor (1.50), and most errors (9), of all major league right fielders.

Hawpe was named to the 2009 MLB All-Star Game. Hawpe went 0-for-2 with a strikeout in the game. He was robbed of a potential go-ahead home run in the seventh inning by Tampa Bay Rays outfielder Carl Crawford, who was awarded the All-Star Game MVP award for the catch.

The Rockies placed Hawpe on waivers on August 16, 2010. He was given his release on August 18, though he was on waivers until August 26. On August 27, Hawpe signed a minor league contract with the Tampa Bay Rays, reporting to the Class A Charlotte Stone Crabs.

Following the 2010 season, Hawpe signed a one-year, $3 million contract with the San Diego Padres. With the Padres, he returned to playing first base. Hawpe played in 62 games for Padres in 2011 before going on the disabled list in late June and then undergoing season-ending Tommy John surgery on August 5.

Hawpe signed a minor league contract with the Texas Rangers on January 20, 2012 with an invitation to spring training. On March 29, 2012, Hawpe was released by the Rangers.

On January 17, 2013, the Pittsburgh Pirates signed Hawpe to a minor league contract with an invitation to spring training. He was released on March 23.

On April 10, 2013, Hawpe signed a minor league contract with the Los Angeles Angels of Anaheim. He played for the Triple-A Salt Lake Bees until his contract was purchased by the Angels on June 8. Prior to having his contract purchased, Hawpe had wondered if his time in the big leagues was over. "I was OK with it," Hawpe said. "I've had a bunch of good memories in this game. I've been very fortunate and blessed. It doesn't mean I wouldn't like to make some more memories, but I've been very blessed, and if that was the end of it, I was OK with it."

On July 29, the Angels designated Hawpe for assignment. On August 4, the team released him.
