= Eagle Mountain-Saginaw Independent School District =

School district in Texas

Coordinates: 32.8775°N 97.3908°W

Location
- Tarrant County, Texas United States

District information
- Type: Public, Independent school district
- Superintendent: Jerry D. Hollingsworth
- School board: Marilyn Tolbert; Page Ring; T. Craig Morgan; William Boaz; Steven G. Newcom; Ron Franklin; Blake Mabry
- Governing agency: Texas Education Agency

Other information
- Website: http://www.emsisd.com/

The Eagle Mountain-Saginaw Independent School District is located in the northwest corner of Tarrant County and includes 73 square miles (190 km^{2}) of land in Saginaw, Blue Mound and formerly Eagle Mountain, and several housing additions in the City of Fort Worth, near Eagle Mountain Lake. Serving more than 18,000 students (a 17% increase over last year), the district consists of 16 elementary schools, six middle schools, five high schools, and a career training center extension campus for high school students.

All campuses in the district are accredited by the Southern Association of Colleges and Schools and the Texas Education Agency. From kindergarten to high school, diverse special programs are available to support the regular curriculum and to accommodate disabilities. The district also offers an alternative education to at-risk students through Watson High School's Alternative Discipline Center.

== History ==
Bell v. Eagle Mountain Saginaw Independent School District was a 2022 United States Court of Appeals for the Fifth Circuit decision involving copyright infringement laws. In 2020, a sports psychologist and motivational speaker sued the school district after two sports teams at Chisholm Trail High School posted in 2017 a motivational quote from his book Winning Isn't Normal on the social media website Twitter (now X). The school removed the posts upon a request made by Bell. The Court determined that Bell was a serial litigant, and ordered him to pay the district's legal fees. The court also opined that the tweets were fair use.

In 2025, the Chadwell Administration Building and Discovery Lab Learning Center was among six selected by the Texas Association of School Administrators and Texas Association of School Boards to win the William Wayne Caudill Award in the annual Exhibit of School Architecture. The same year, the district faced a US$10,000,000 budget deficit, 10% of which was due to staffing costs at Eagle Mountain High School (EMHS), which was opened in 2024. Superintendent Jerry Hollingsworth called reports of the deficit a "manufactured crisis just for politics." To cover the deficit, the district moved its fiscal year termination from September 1 to July 1, and planned to staff EMHS with faculty from their other high schools, which it said was overstaffed. The district also said they planned to lower student-to-teacher ratios, which improve learning outcomes.

== Schools ==
=== High Schools (Grades 9-12) ===
- Boswell High School
- Chisholm Trail High School
- Eagle Mountain High School
- Saginaw High School
- Watson High School

=== Middle Schools (Grades 6-8) ===
- Creekview Middle School
- Ed Willkie Middle School
- Highland Middle School
- Marine Creek Middle School
- Prairie Vista Middle School
- Wayside Middle School

=== Elementary Schools (Grades K-5) ===
- Bryson Elementary School
- Chisholm Ridge Elementary School
- Comanche Springs Elementary School
- Copper Creek Elementary School
- Dozier Elementary School
- Eagle Mountain Elementary School
- Elkins Elementary School
- Gililland Elementary School
- Greenfield Elementary School
- Hatley Elementary School
- High Country Elementary School
- Lake Country Elementary School
- Lake Point Elementary School
- Northbrook Elementary School
- Parkview Elementary School
- Remington Elementary School
- Saginaw Elementary School
- Willow Creek Elementary School

=== Specialty Campuses ===
- Alternative Discipline Center
- Hafley Development Center
- Sarah Hollenstein Career and Technology Center
