= Wooldridge =

Wooldridge may refer to the following:

== People ==
- Wooldridge (surname)

== Place names ==
- Wooldridge, Eastern Cape, South Africa
- Wooldridge, Missouri
- Wooldridge, Tennessee
- Wooldridge Park (in Austin, Texas)

== See also ==
- Woolridge
