= Woolridge (disambiguation) =

Woolridge is a village in Gloucestershire, England.

Woolridge may also refer to:

- Andre Woolridge, American basketball player
- Edward Woolridge, American Negro league baseball player
- Elizabeth Woolridge Grant, American musician professionally known as Lana Del Rey
- Orlando Woolridge, American basketball player
- Randolph Woolridge, cricket player

== See also ==
- Wooldridge (disambiguation)
