= List of elections in 1847 =

The following elections occurred in the year 1847.

== Africa ==
=== Liberia ===
- 1847 Liberian general election
- 1847 Liberian constitutional referendum

== North America ==
=== Central America ===
- 1847 Costa Rican Head of State election

=== United States ===
- 1847 New York state election

==== United States Senate ====
- 1846 and 1847 United States Senate elections

==== United States House of Representatives ====
- 1846 and 1847 United States House of Representatives elections

==== United States lieutenant gubernatorial ====
- 1847 Connecticut lieutenant gubernatorial election
- 1847 Texas lieutenant gubernatorial election

==== United States gubernatorial ====
- 1847 Alabama gubernatorial election
- 1847 Connecticut gubernatorial election
- 1847 Georgia gubernatorial election
- 1847 Maine gubernatorial election
- 1847 Maryland gubernatorial election
- 1847 Massachusetts gubernatorial election
- 1847 Michigan gubernatorial election
- 1847 Mississippi gubernatorial election
- 1847 New Hampshire gubernatorial election
- 1847 New Jersey gubernatorial election
- 1847 Pennsylvania gubernatorial election
- 1847 Rhode Island gubernatorial election
- 1847 Tennessee gubernatorial election
- 1847 Texas gubernatorial election
- 1847 Vermont gubernatorial election

==== United States mayoral elections ====
- 1847 Boston mayoral election
- 1847 Chicago mayoral election
- 1847 Manchester, New Hampshire mayoral election
- 1847 Philadelphia mayoral election

== Europe ==
=== United Kingdom ===
- 1847 United Kingdom general election

== See also ==
- Category:1847 elections
