= 1847 Texas lieutenant gubernatorial election =

- November 1, 1847
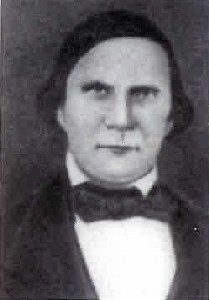

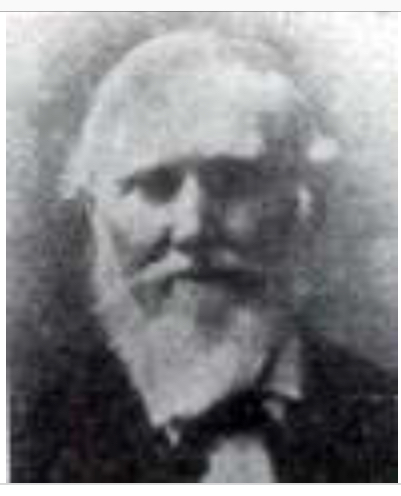

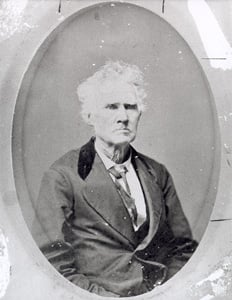

| Nominee | John Alexander Greer | Edward H. Tarrant |
| Party | Democratic | Independent |
| Popular vote | 4,890 | 3,587 |
| Percentage | 41.5% | 30.4% |
| Nominee | Edwin Waller | Samuel G. Haynie |
| Party | Independent | Independent |
| Popular vote | 2,979 | 327 |
| Percentage | 25.3% | 2.8% |
Lieutenant Governor before election
Albert C. Horton
Democratic
Elected Lieutenant Governor
John Alexander Greer
Democratic

The 1847 Texas lieutenant gubernatorial election was held on November 1, 1847, in order to elect the lieutenant governor of Texas. Democratic candidate John Alexander Greer was elected as the second lieutenant governor of Texas defeating candidates Edward H. Tarrant and Edwin Waller.

== General election ==
The incumbent lieutenant governor, Albert Clinton Horton did not run for reelection. There had not been a strong partisan during the Republic period of Texas and while political parties, such as the Democrats, did exist and were popular within the state, not all members of the political class had aligned themselves to the new party. Even if they did identify with a political party, candidates often ran independent campaigns.

=== Candidates ===
- John Alexander Greer, former Texas Secretary of the Treasury, President pro tempore of the Senate in the Congress of the Republic of Texas
- Edward H. Tarrant, chief justice of Red River County, militia leader, former Representative in the Congress of the Republic of Texas
- Edwin Leonard Waller, Chief Justice of Austin County, first Mayor of Austin, Texas Postmaster General, Delegate at the Convention of 1836 and drafter of the Constitution of the Republic of Texas, Delegate at the Consultation and signer of the Texas Declaration of Independence
- Samuel G. Haynie, doctor, postmaster of Austin, former representative in the Congress of the Republic of Texas

=== Results ===
Texas lieutenant gubernatorial election, 1847
| Party | Candidate | Votes | % |
|---|---|---|---|
| Democratic | John Alexander Greer | 4,890 | 41.50 |
| Independent | Edward H. Tarrant | 3,587 | 30.44 |
| Independent | Edwin Waller | 2,979 | 25.28 |
| Independent | Samuel G. Haynie | 327 | 2.78 |
| Total votes | | 11,783 | 100.00 |
| Democratic hold | | | |
