= John Treviño Jr. =

American politician (1938–2017)

Acting Mayor of Austin
- In office February 1983 – May 1983
- Preceded by: Carole Keeton Strayhorn
- Succeeded by: Ron Mullen

Member of the Austin City Council
- In office 1975–1988

Personal details
- Born: October 18, 1938 Austin, Texas, U.S.
- Died: April 4, 2017 (aged 78) Austin, Texas, U.S.
- Spouse: Connie Loya (m. 1955; div. 1980)
- Children: 8

Military service
- Allegiance: United States
- Branch/service: United States Army

John Treviño Jr. (October 18, 1938 – April 4, 2017) was an American politician who served as the acting mayor of Austin from February to May 1983. He was the first Mexican-American to serve on the Austin City Council, serving from 1975 to 1988. Treviño was part of a coalition that ended the exclusive grip of Anglo power in the city of Austin.

== Early life and service ==
Treviño was born in Austin, and at age 8 volunteered to become a Catholic altar boy. He did odd jobs such as laundry service and made deliveries for a local blueprint company. His family was described to have a modest income. After he volunteered for a Catholic service group, the St. Vincent de Paul Society, his eyes were opened to the poverty around him. At age 17, Treviño volunteered for the army and trained as a paratrooper in the 82nd Airborne Division. He became a paid anti-poverty worker, the first at the East First Neighborhood Center, when he was 27. In the Austin community of Montopolis, Treviño partnered with a local Catholic priest, Father Underwood, to operate a VISTA (Volunteers in Service to America) program that had been newly created as part of the War on Poverty initiative.

== Austin City Council ==
In the early 1970s, Treviño, Gus Garcia, Richard Moya and Gonzalo Barrientos were known by journalists as the "Young Turks" or the "Brown Machine". These Hispanic leaders, along with a coalition that included labor activists, African-Americans, and young voters, overturned the traditional Anglo businessmen based power structure of Austin.

In 1973, Treviño sought a seat on the Austin City Council but lost the election. But in 1975, he won the election and served for 13 years. He contributed a number of improvements while on the City Council, such as construction of clinics across the city to provide access to health care for the poor. He created the Department of Small and Minority Business Resources which supported women and minorities as part of city commissions and boards. He established a review of hiring practices to provide fair access to city jobs for minorities and women. Several conflicts with the vendors at the Renaissance Market on Guadalupe Street were also resolved in his time. In 1978, he became the mayor pro tem. In 1983, he served as acting mayor for three months when then-mayor Carole Keeton was appointed to the State Board of Insurance. In 1983, Treviño received 59,905 votes for his re-election, which is the most votes ever received by an Austin City Council candidate.

== Later life ==
The University of Texas at Austin School of Social Work nominated Treviño to attend an International Conference on Social Welfare in Helsinki, Finland. He was one of 13 Americans invited. After scandals at the Capital Metro board of directors, Trevino was elected to help clean it up. He served on the board from 1997 to 2009. He was a member of the board of directors of the Greater Austin Hispanic Chamber of Commerce and he served on the International Board of the U.S./Mexico Sister Cities Association.

In 2006, the City of Austin designated a park in his honor, the John John Treviño Jr. Metropolitan Park at Morrison Ranch. Treviño died at his Austin home in April 2017, aged 78.
