= 1998 Texas Comptroller of Public Accounts election =

- November 3, 1998
- Turnout: 31.9%
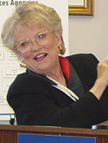

Nominee	Carole Keeton Rylander	Paul Hobby
Party	Republican	Democratic
Popular vote	1,821,231	1,801,008
Percentage	49.55%	49.00%
- County results Rylander: 40–50% 50–60% 60–70% 70–80% Hobby: 40–50% 50–60% 60–70% 70–80% 80–90%
Comptroller before election
John Sharp
Democratic
Elected Comptroller
Carole Keeton Rylander
Republican

The 1998 Texas Comptroller of Public Accounts election took place on November 3, 1998, to elect the comptroller of Public Accounts of Texas. Incumbent Democratic comptroller John Sharp chose to run for lieutenant governor instead of seeking another term. In the Democratic primary, businessman Paul Hobby, son of former Lieutenant Governor Bill Hobby, won the nomination unopposed. In the Republican primary, incumbent Railroad Commissioner Carole Keeton Rylander won the nomination unopposed. In the general election, Republican candidates swept all of the statewide offices. Rylander's win was the narrowest margin as she defeated Hobby by just 0.55% of the vote, becoming the first Republican comptroller of Texas since Reconstruction. Republicans won every Texas comptroller election from 1998 until 2026.

This was the first election since the office of Texas State Treasurer was abolished and its responsibilities transferred to the Comproller's office.

== Republican primary ==
=== Candidates ===
- Carole Keeton Rylander, Texas railroad commissioner

=== Results ===
Republican primary results
Party	Candidate	Votes	%
Republican	Carole Keeton Rylander	432,558	100.00
Total votes		432,558	100.0

== Democratic primary ==
=== Candidates ===
- Paul Hobby, businessman

Democratic primary results
Party	Candidate	Votes	%
Democratic	Paul Hobby	472,027	100.0%
Total votes		472,027	100.0%

== General election ==
Following George W. Bush's victory over incumbent governor Ann Richards in 1994, and Republicans' takeover of the state senate in 1996, Texas Democrats were clearly on the back foot heading into the 1998 election campaign. Nonetheless, the Comptroller's race was viewed by many political observers as one of the most winnable statewide races for Democrats due to Paul Hobby's conservative history. Despite the progressive streak of Hobby's father, former Lieutenant Governor Bill Hobby, Paul Hobby was more "business oriented," and had even rejected an offer from Lieutenant Governor Bob Bullock to be the Chair of the Texas Democratic Party.

Late in the campaign, when Hobby appeared to be on track to a narrow victory, Rylander received a $950,000 loan from conservative Christian activist James Leininger, which allowed her campaign to dominate the television airwaves. Many political observers viewed this as the turning point in the campaign.

Rylander defeated Hobby by a mere 20,223 votes, or 0.55% of the vote. Rylander's best performance came from the Texas Hill Country, the Dallas and Houston suburbs, and the Texas Panhandle. Hobby's best performance came from the traditionally Democratic areas of South Texas, as well as east Texas, an area with higher proportions of black voters. Rylander's victory made her the first Republican Comptroller since Reconstruction and the first female Comptroller.

=== Candidates ===
- Paul Hobby, businessman (D)
- Alex Monchak (L)
- Carole Keeton Rylander, Texas railroad commissioner (R)

=== Results ===
1998 election for Comptroller of Public Accounts
Party	Candidate	Votes	%	±%
Republican	Carole Keeton Rylander	1,821,231	49.55	
Democratic	Paul Hobby	1,801,008	49.00	
Libertarian	Alex Monchak	53,536	1.46	
Majority		20,223	0.55	
Total votes		3,675,775	100.00	
Republican gain from Democratic				

== See also ==
- Texas Comptroller of Public Accounts
