= Jeffrey Friedman =

Jeffrey Friedman may refer to:

- Jeffrey Friedman (filmmaker) (born 1951), American film director and producer
- Jeffrey Friedman (political scientist) (1959–2022), American political scientist and editor
- Jeffrey Friedman (politician) (1945–2007), American politician serving as mayor of Austin, Texas in the 1970s
- Jeffrey M. Friedman (born 1954), molecular geneticist
