= Roy Butler =

Roy Butler may refer to:

- Roy Butler (American politician) (1926–2009), mayor of Austin, Texas
- Roy Butler (Australian politician), member of the New South Wales Legislative Assembly
