= Wooldridge (surname) =

Wooldridge is a surname, and may refer to:

- Adrian Wooldridge, Washington bureau chief of the Economist
- Alexander Penn Wooldridge (1847–1930), mayor of Austin, Texas
- Ben Wooldridge (born 1999), American football player
- Billy Wooldridge (1878–1945), English footballer who spent his career with Wolverhampton Wanderers
- Charles Thomas Wooldridge (1866–1896), immortalised in The Ballad of Reading Gaol
- Charlie Wooldridge (1897–1982), American baseball player
- Dean Wooldridge (1913–2006), prominent engineer in the aerospace industry
- Doug Wooldridge (born 1985), Canadian rugby union player
- Floyd Wooldridge (1928–2008), American baseball player
- George B. Wooldridge, the business manager of the first blackface minstrel troupe
- Harry Ellis Wooldridge (1845–1917), English musical antiquary and Slade Professor of Fine Art
- Hugh Wooldridge, director, producer
- Ian Wooldridge (1932–2007), British sports journalist
- Jeffrey Wooldridge (born 1960), American econometrician
- Jeremy Wooldridge, American politician
- Jim Wooldridge (born 1955), American basketball coach and athletics administrator
- Joel Wooldridge (born 1979), American bridge player
- John Wooldridge (1919–1958), British film composer
- Keith Wooldridge (born 1943), British tennis player
- Leonard Charles Wooldridge (1857–1889), English physician and physiologist
- Lovell Wooldridge (1901–1983), English cricketer
- Margaret Wooldridge, American combustion engineer
- Mark Wooldridge (born 1962), American tennis player
- Mary Wooldridge (born 1967), Australian politician of the Liberal Party
- Michael Wooldridge (politician) (born 1956), Australian doctor and politician
- Mike Wooldridge (broadcaster), British journalist; world affairs correspondent for BBC News
- Michael Wooldridge (computer scientist) (born 1966), professor at the University of Oxford
- Sherri L. Wooldridge, American politician
- Sidney William Wooldridge (1900–1963), English geologist and physical geographer
- Stephen Wooldridge (1977–2017), Australian racing cyclist
- Steve Wooldridge (born 1950), English footballer
- Sue Ellen Wooldridge (born 1961), American attorney and former political appointee
- Susan Wooldridge (born 1952), British actress
- William O. Wooldridge (1922–2012), first Sergeant Major of the United States Army
