= Gustavo L. Garcia =

American politician

Gustavo García

55th Mayor of Austin
- In office November 9, 2001 – June 16, 2003
- Preceded by: Kirk Watson
- Succeeded by: Will Wynn

Personal details
- Born: January 23, 1934 Zapata, Texas, U.S.
- Died: December 17, 2018 (aged 84) Austin, Texas, U.S.
- Education: University of Texas at Austin (BBA)

Gustavo L. "Gus" García (January 23, 1934 – December 17, 2018) was an American politician who served as the 55th mayor of Austin from 2001 to 2003. He was the first Hispanic to hold the office.

== Early life ==
García was born in 1934 in Zapata, Texas, a poor border town, where his father ran a small grocery store. When he was 10, he moved to Laredo with his mother and siblings, where he enrolled in 7th grade.

García enlisted in the United States Army in 1954. When García returned to Laredo, he married Marina Gonzalez in 1957. Shortly thereafter, they moved to Austin, where he enrolled at the University of Texas at Austin. He soon encountered discrimination, and was barred from fraternities.

García earned a bachelor's degree in business administration in 1959. García opened his own company, and for years, García was the only Hispanic accountant in town.

== Public service ==
=== Human Rights Commission ===
In 1967 Garcia was selected as the only Hispanic for the 21-member Human Relations Commission, (later renamed Human Rights Commission).

The commission's work included housing and employment discrimination, as well as education, police-community relations, ambulance service, and the Economy Furniture strike. Garcia investigated and helped expose discrimination at the Austin Housing Authority.

Building upon this work he helped write a Fair Housing Ordinance, which was passed in 1968 by the City Council, however the Austin Board of Realtors (ABOR) soon lead a petition drive and the ordinance was repealed in a citywide vote.

Garcia served two years on the Commission and left when his term expired in 1969.

=== Austin School Board ===
After leaving the commission, García continued to be involved in politics and the ongoing civil rights struggle. He turned his attention to the Austin school board. In 1971 the first African-American school board member, Wilhelmina R. Delco, led a failed effort to appoint García to the board to fill an unexpired term. He ran for an open seat in 1972 and won.

The practice of desegregation busing had begun, but the Austin school district resisted, fighting a federal discrimination order in court. The school district had been found in violation of the 1964.

García, who had three children enrolled in Austin schools, supported court-ordered busing. However a majority of the board fought the busing decree in court, including Carole Keeton Strayhorn, who was the school board president. García consistently voted against the school district's appeals of the discrimination lawsuit.

In 1975 García won a second term to the board and fellow board members chose him as president of the board. At the end of his second term in 1978 he left office. He ran for the State Board of Education in 1978 and 1982, losing both times to Will Davis. After his attempts to win statewide office, García turned his focus to his accounting business.

=== City Council ===
García first ran for Austin City Council in 1991. On May 4, he won a majority of the votes and advanced to a run-off. On May 18, 1991 he beat Gilbert Martinez to secure a seat on the council. He was reelected in 1994 to Place 5 and again in 1997, to Place 2.

Once on the council, García closed his CPA business and focused himself on his council work, beginning with youth and housing programs. For example, he successfully helped start an anti-graffiti program that also provides family counseling to counter poverty and patterns of alienation. His efforts yielded numerous East Austin facilities, like the Cepeda Branch Library, the Zavala recreation center, Plaza Saltillo, the Mexican American Cultural Center and Tillery Square, an affordable housing development. Austin–Bergstrom International Airport was completed during his tenure on the council. When deregulation proponents proposed the city sell its public electric utility, García was key in keeping what is now Austin Energy in the public's hands. García supported the successful acquisition of significant acreage for nature preserves and parks.

After being put on the ballot by a petition, Austin voters overwhelmingly passed the SOS (Save Our Springs) ordinance on August 8, 1992. In December 1994, a jury in Hays County overturned SOS and the city council was evenly divided over whether to appeal the decision. Mayor Bruce Todd, Ronnie Reynolds and Charles Urdy, opposed the appeal. Max Nofziger, Jackie Goodman and Brigid Shea were in favor. García's vote was the deciding factor. He voted in favor and the city appealed and won. The court reinstated the SOS ordinance in 1996.

=== Mayor ===
García was elected mayor of Austin on November 6, 2001. Mayor Kirk Watson had stepped down to run for state office and García ran in a special election. He won 59% of the vote in a field of eight candidates.

García faced many challenges, including tough budget conditions and a development agreement with Stratus Properties. He overcame opposition to institute Austin's smoking ban. García served nine years as a city council member and 19 months as mayor.

He did not seek reelection in the 2003 Austin mayoral election.

== Personal life ==
García married Marina González in 1957, and they remained married until his death. The couple had three sons and five grandchildren. García died in Austin, Texas on December 17, 2018, at the age of 84.

Political offices
| Preceded by Kirk Watson | Mayor of Austin, Texas; 2001–2003 | Succeeded by Will Wynn |
