= Will Wynn =

American businessman and politician

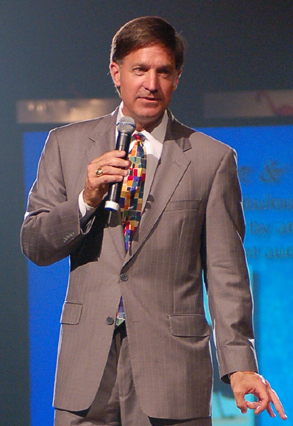

56th Mayor of Austin
- In office June 16, 2003 – June 22, 2009
- Preceded by: Gus Garcia
- Succeeded by: Lee Leffingwell

Personal details
- Born: William Patrick Wynn; September 10, 1961 (age 65) Beaumont, Texas, U.S.
- Party: Democratic
- Children: 2
- Education: Texas A&M University

William Patrick Wynn (born September 10, 1961) is an American businessman and politician who served as the 56th mayor of Austin from 2003 to 2009.

== Family ==
Born and raised in Beaumont, Texas, Wynn was the sixth of seven children. He attended Texas A&M University, where he graduated cum laude with a degree in Environmental Design in 1984. Although Wynn was born in East Texas, he has deep familial roots in Austin and Central Texas; two of his great-great-great-grandparents, James and Julia Olive, settled in southern Williamson County in 1843.

His great-grandfather, Daniel LeMaster of McDade, was the state representative for Bastrop County in the 1920s. Will's great-uncle, Ridley Ott, built and managed the Checker Front General Store, now FreshPlus, at 43rd and Duval in Hyde Park during the 1930s and 1940s.

Some of his family's history in Central Texas can be seen in several books by J. Frank Dobie, including "Cow People" and "The Longhorns"; "The Ladder of Rivers" by Harry Chrisman; "Black Cowboys of Texas" by Sara Massey, "Four on a Limb" and "I'll Die Before I'll Run" by C.L. Sonnichsen; and "The Shooters" by Leon Metz.

He first moved to Austin in 1981 and is the father of two daughters.

== Early career ==
Wynn has over 20 years of experience in the commercial real estate industry, with projects large and small, including the $40 million redevelopment of the Frost Bank Plaza on Congress Avenue in Downtown Austin. In 1997, Will founded CIVITAS Investments, Inc. to focus on historic restoration projects. He is a member of the Urban Land Institute and believes that only through dramatically better land use practices can Austin and the surrounding region appropriately deal with challenges like traffic, air quality, housing affordability and environmental protection. In 2001, he was one of the founding members of, what became, Envision Central Texas. Will has also worked over the years to build support for numerous local causes and organizations.

Prior to being elected to the Austin City Council in 2000, Wynn served as chair of the Downtown Austin Alliance, in addition to acting as director of the Children's Museum and Heritage Society of Austin. He has long been a leading advocate for transforming downtown Austin into the most vibrant urban core in the country.

== Mayor of Austin ==
Austin voters elected Wynn to be Austin's fiftieth mayor on May 3, 2003, replacing Gus Garcia. He was re-elected three years later on May 15, 2006, with over 78 percent of the vote. The front-runner from the start, Wynn garnered most of the endorsements and raised much more money than his two competitors, Council Member Danny Thomas, and Jennifer Gale. He also received a boost from the strong leadership credited to him when Hurricane Katrina evacuees came to Austin in 2005.

As mayor, Wynn served as chairman of the board of directors for Austin Energy, the ninth-largest public power utility in the United States. As such, Mayor Wynn presided over the nation's most successful utility-sponsored green power program (for the fourth consecutive year according to the U. S. Department of Energy), an award-winning energy efficiency program that has eliminated the need for a 500-megawatt, coal-burning power plant near Austin, and a green-building program that was the first of its kind in the world and served as the genesis for the U. S. Green Building Council (USGBC) and the national green-building movement. Austin Energy has assets of over $3.5 billion, annual revenues of $1.2 billion, almost 1,500 employees, and generates up to 3,000 megawatts of electricity. Its fuel mix is 35% natural gas, 29% coal, 23% nuclear and 11% renewable energy, mostly from wind.

Wynn was succeeded as mayor by Lee Leffingwell, who was sworn in on June 22, 2009.

=== Awards ===
Will was named Austinite of the Year by Austin Under Forty; was awarded Scenic Austin's first annual Scenic Hero Award, was named Energy Executive of the Year by the Association of Energy Engineers, and is a distinguished alumnus of Texas A & M's College of Architecture. He also received the Alliance to Save Energy's prestigious Charles H. Percy Public Service Award and, following Austin's response to Hurricane Katrina, the National Association of Social Workers named him Local Public Official of the Year.

=== Affiliations ===
He is a member of the Mayors Against Illegal Guns Coalition, a bipartisan anti-gun group with a stated goal of "making the public safer by getting illegal guns off the streets." The Coalition was co-founded by the late former Boston Mayor Thomas Menino and former New York City Mayor Michael Bloomberg.

=== Toll roads ===
Mayor Wynn voted in favor of a Capital Area Metropolitan Planning Organization (CAMPO) toll road plan on July 12, 2004, prompting the Texas People for Efficient Transportation PAC to start a movement seek a recall election of the mayor. The committee volunteers gathered over 36,000 signatures but fell short of the 40,000 needed to place the recall on the May 7, 2005 ballot.

== Controversies and conviction ==
Mayor Will Wynn apologized after he physically ejected a man who had crashed a party at Wynn's downtown condo building on March 17, 2006. The man claimed that after being told to leave by Wynn, the mayor followed him outside and proceeded to choke him.

On November 11, 2007, Wynn also became involved in an incident involving him yelling at a truck that had blocked morning rush-hour traffic on downtown Austin's 5th Street. The Mayor apologized and said he "spewed a fog of profanity".

On March 5, 2008, Travis County prosecutors charged Wynn with a Class C misdemeanor for an assault. At his sentencing, the judge ordered Wynn to seek anger management therapy.

Political offices
Preceded by Gus Garcia	Mayor of Austin, Texas; 2003–2009	Succeeded by Lee Leffingwell
