= Bruce Todd =

American politician and businessman

- Todd in 2019

53rd Mayor of Austin
- In office June 15, 1991 – June 15, 1997
- Preceded by: Lee Cooke
- Succeeded by: Kirk Watson

Member of the Travis County Commissioners Court
- In office 1987–1991
- In office 2013–2014

Personal details
- Born: Bruce Todd; December 17, 1949 Breckenridge, Texas, U.S.
- Died: December 25, 2021 (aged 72)
- Party: Democratic
- Education: University of Texas at Austin (BBA)

Bruce Todd (December 17, 1949 – December 25, 2021) was an American politician who served as the 53rd mayor of Austin from 1991 to 1997. A member of the Democratic Party, Todd oversaw significant infrastructure and economic projects that shaped the city's modern landscape. He was a member of the Travis County Commissioners Court from 1987 to 1991 and from 2013 to 2014.

== Early life and education ==
Bruce Todd was born on December 17, 1949, in Breckenridge, Texas. He graduated from The University of Texas at Austin with a business administration degree. Before entering mayoral politics, he was a member of the Travis County Commissioners Court from 1987 to 1991.

== Political career ==
After Mayor Lee Cooke decided not to run for reelection 1991, Todd announced his mayoral campaign. He ultimately defeated Austin City Council Member Robert Barnstone by a narrow margin of less than four percent. In 1994, Todd ran for reelection against political editor Daryl Slusher. The race coincided with a contentious ballot initiative over domestic partner benefits for city employees, which substantially drove up the voter turnout. Todd once again won the election narrowly, this time by a margin of less than two percent.

During his tenure, he successfully negotiated the federal transfer of the decommissioned Bergstrom Air Force Base and campaigned for a $600 million bond to establish Austin–Bergstrom International Airport. Todd also partnered with Council Member Gustavo L. Garcia to pass Austin's landmark no-smoking law, oversaw the transfer of Brackenridge Hospital to Seton Healthcare Family, and championed local wilderness preservation. He also recruited major employers such as Samsung austin semiconductor, AMD, and Applied Materials.

In December 2005, Todd was involved in a bicycle accident on an organized ride south of Lockhart on Highway 183. He sustained injuries to his facial bones, ribs, nose and scapula. Todd was transported to Brackenridge Hospital by Caldwell County EMS. Todd's condition later improved, with doctors noting that wearing a bicycle helmet—a cause he championed during his tenure—saved his life. Instead of flowers or cards, his family requested helmet donations for needy children.

Todd later founded Bruce Todd Public Affairs and Rail Relo NOW. He served on the Travis County Commissioners Court again from 2013 to 2014 after Sarah Eckhardt resigned to run for County Judge.

Todd passed away on December 25, 2021, at the age of 72, due to complications of Lewy Body disease.
