= Asa Brigham =

American politician

4th Mayor of Austin
- In office 1842–1843
- Preceded by: Moses Johnson
- Succeeded by: Joseph W. Robertson

1st & 3rd Treasurer of the Republic of Texas
- In office December 1836 – April 1840
- Preceded by: Office established
- Succeeded by: James Wright Simmons
- In office December 1841 – 3 July 1844
- Preceded by: James Wright Simmons
- Succeeded by: Moses Johnson

Personal details
- Born: 31 August 1788 Marlborough, Massachusetts
- Died: 3 July 1844 (aged 55) Washington, Texas
- Citizenship: American
- Spouses: Elizabeth Swift Babcock (m. 1810) Ann Johnson Mather (m. 1839)
- Children: John Brigham; Benjamin Brigham
- Parent(s): Lewis Brigham and Mary (Rice) Brigham
- Occupation: tailor, merchant, Texas politician
- Known for: signer of Texas Declaration of Independence; Treasurer of Texas

Asa Brigham (31 August 1788 – 3 July 1844) was an American politician and businessman who served as the first and third treasurer of the Republic of Texas from 1836 to 1840 and from 1841 to 1844 and as the fourth mayor of Austin from 1842 to 1843. He was also a signer of the Texas Declaration of Independence in 1836.

== Biography ==
Asa Brigham was born in Marlborough, Massachusetts, on 31 August 1788 to Lewis Brigham and Mary Rice Brigham. Marriage banns for Brigham and Elizabeth Swift Babcock were published 9 Dec 1810 at Watertown, Massachusetts. He resided at Lunenburg, Massachusetts, from 1810 to 1816 and was employed as a tailor. He immigrated in 1816 to Alexandria, Louisiana, after suffering a fire and loss of his business. By the time he arrived in Texas from Louisiana in April 1830, he was married and had two sons, Samuel and Benjamin, and a married daughter, Adeliza Lewis Brigham. In December of the same year he was elected as síndico procurador in the precinct of Victoria and a year later elected comisario for the same precinct. Also in 1831, Brigham was appointed to the Brazoria district Board of Health.

At the time, there was increasing discontent in Texas with the policies of the Mexican government, particularly the ban on slavery and the disarmament/expulsion of American immigrants. On June 20, 1832, Brigham joined a number of Texan politicians in signing a convention which indicated their willingness to engage in military actions to ensure the independence of Texas. On October 6 of the same year, he was elected treasurer of the Brazoria district.

After 1832 he kept a ferry at Brazoria, and, in partnership with his son-in-law, ran a mercantile business. He became a stockholder in the San Saba Colonization Company and was a receiver of stock for the Brazos and Galveston Railroad. He bought land at Hall's Bayou in Brazoria County and in the counties of Galveston and Bastrop, where he grew sugar, cotton and corn in addition to raising cattle. At this time, Brigham owned a number of slaves, but later in his life, he was to sign numerous petitions against slavery.

By 1833, his wife, son-in-law and one of his daughters had died. In 1835 he was elected Brazoria alcalde and was one of the four representatives of Brazoria who attended the convention at Washington-on-the-Brazos in 1836, where he signed the Texas Declaration of Independence.

Since Brigham had been influential in the founding of a Masonic Lodge in Brazoria, he served as a charter member of the Masonic Grand Lodge of Texas in Houston on December 20, 1837. He was appointed auditor of the Republic of Texas by David G. Burnet and named Texas's first treasurer by President Sam Houston in December 1836. He was re-appointed as treasurer by Mirabeau B. Lamar in January 1839 but left the treasury in April the next year. He was charged with using state funds for private purposes during his time as treasurer but later cleared. He was re-appointed treasurer again in December 1841, and in 1842 became the fourth mayor of Austin.

He married his second wife, Ann Johnson Mather, on July 8, 1839. Brigham died July 3, 1844, in Washington, Texas, and was buried there. Texas built a monument to him there in 1936, and his remains were later moved to Washington-on-the-Brazos State Historical Park.

== Genealogy ==
Asa Brigham was a descendant of Edmund Rice, an English immigrant to the Massachusetts Bay Colony, as follows:

- Asa Brigham, son of
  - Mary Rice (8 Apr 1767 – 15 Jun 1797), daughter of
  - Benjamin Rice (4 Jan 1740 – 23 Apr 1811), son of
  - Deacon Andrew Rice (18 Jan 1703 – 15 Jan 1775), son of

  - Joshua Rice (19 Apr 1661 – 23 Jun 1734), son of
  - Samuel Rice (12 Nov 1634 – 25 Feb 1684), son of

      - Edmund Rice (1594 – 3 May 1663)
