= 2003 Austin mayoral election =

- May 3, 2003
- Turnout: 14.63%
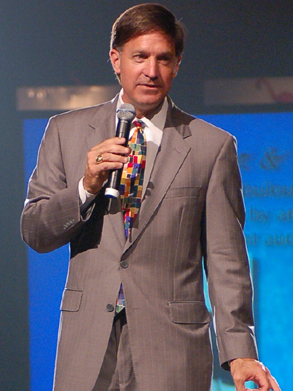

Candidate	Will Wynn	Michael Nofziger
Popular vote	34,211	9,377
Percentage	58.26%	15.97%
Candidate	Marc Katz	Brad Meltzer
Popular vote	7,730	4,851
Percentage	13.16%	8.26%
Mayor before election
Gustavo L. Garcia
Elected mayor
Will Wynn

The 2003 Austin mayoral election was held on May 3, 2003, to elect the mayor of Austin, Texas, USA. Will Wynn was elected.

Incumbent mayor Gustavo L. Garcia did not seek reelection.

== Election results ==
Results
Party	Candidate	Votes	%
Nonpartisan	Will Wynn	34,211	58.26
Nonpartisan	Michael "Max" Nofziger	9,377	15.97
Nonpartisan	Marc Katz	7,730	13.16
Nonpartisan	Brad Meltzer	4,851	8.26
Nonpartisan	Leslie Cochran	1,113	1.90
Nonpartisan	Jennifer Gale	1,077	1.83
Nonpartisan	Christopher N. Keating	240	0.41
Nonpartisan	Herman Luckett	114	0.19
Nonpartisan	Joaquin Jack Fox	4	0.01
Turnout		58,717	
