= Wooldridge Park =

Historic urban park in Austin, Texas

- U.S. National Register of Historic Places
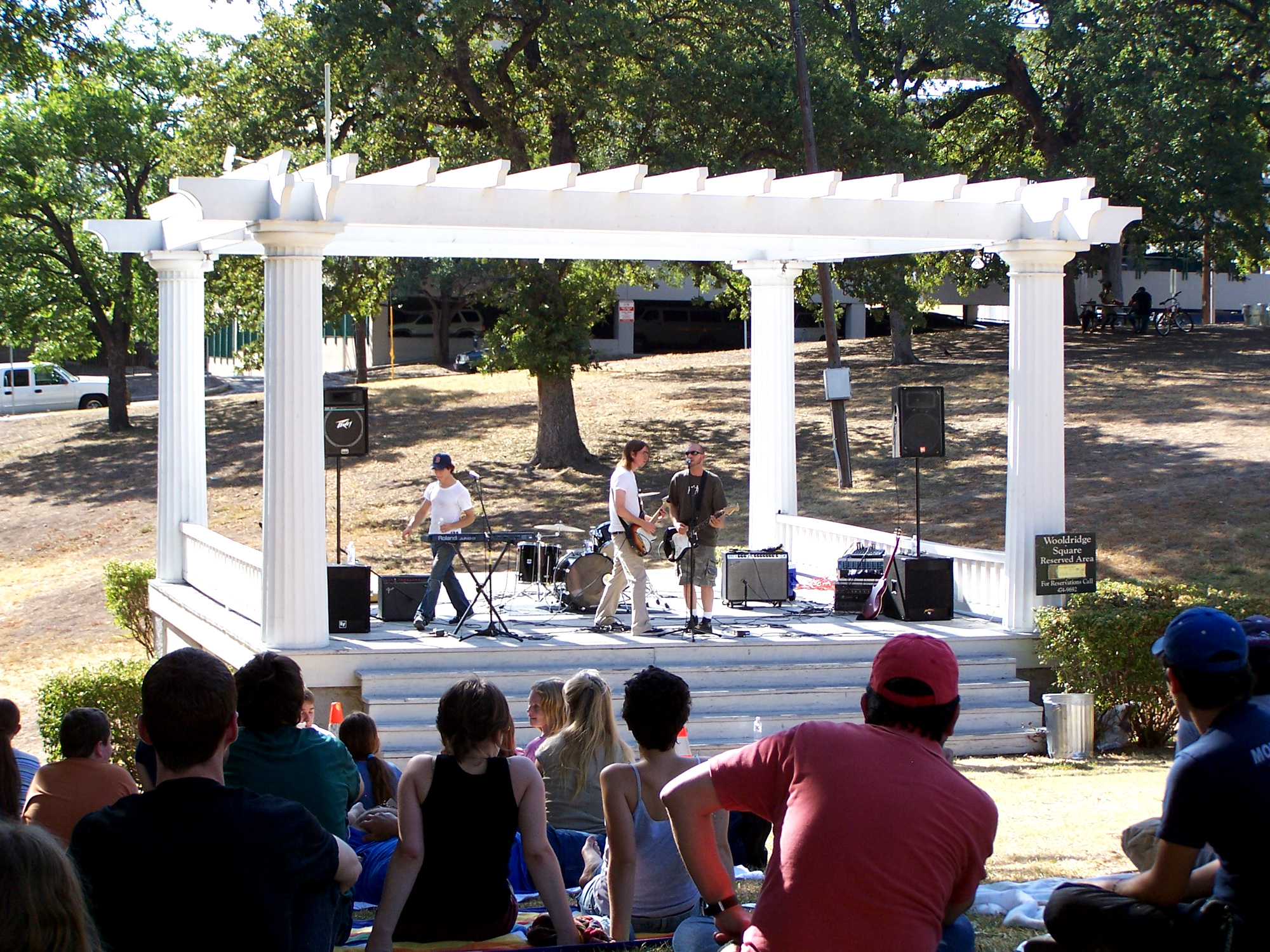
- The gazebo in Wooldridge Park is a popular spot for outdoor concerts and weddings among other engagements.
- Location: Austin, Texas; United States
- Coordinates: 30°16′20″N 97°44′43″W
- Area: 1.8 acres (0.73 ha)
- Built: June 18, 1909
- Architect: Page & Page
- Architectural style: Classical Revival
- NRHP reference No.: 79003018
- Added to NRHP: 1 August 1979

Wooldridge Park, also known as Wooldridge Square, is an urban park in downtown Austin, Texas. The park consists of a city block containing a natural basin whose sides slope inward to form an amphitheater with a bandstand at its center. The park was added to the National Register of Historic Places in 1979.

== History ==
Wooldridge Park is one of four original public squares designated in downtown Austin in the 1839 Waller Plan for the city drawn up by Edwin Waller, but it lay vacant for seventy years. In an era of civic pride in 1909, however, Austin Mayor Alexander Penn Wooldridge sponsored the cleaning of the square and the construction of a classical revival-style gazebo for public engagements, which officially opened the same year. The park was dedicated on June 18, 1909 to considerable aplomb with dedicatory address being made by the Mayor.

Wooldridge Park is the only one of the original public squares to have retained its original function; the other three underwent various uses over time, hosting parking lots, a fire station, a church, a museum, and businesses.

The view of the Texas State Capitol from Wooldridge Park is one of the Capitol View Corridors protected under state and local law from obstruction by tall buildings since 1983.
