= Robert Thomas Miller =

American politician

Robert Thomas Miller (September 21, 1893 – April 30, 1962) was an American politician who served as the 39th and 43rd mayor of Austin from 1933 to 1949 and from 1955 to 1961. The Tom Miller Dam is named after him.
