= 2006 Austin mayoral election =

- May 13, 2006
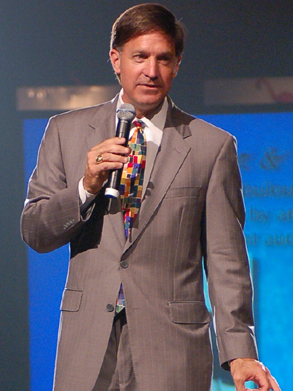

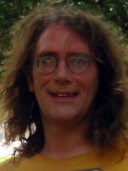
Candidate	Will Wynn	Danny Thomas	Jennifer Gale
Popular vote	41,498	8,093	3,560
Percentage	78.08%	15.23%	6.70%
Mayor before election
Will Wynn
Elected mayor
Will Wynn

The 2006 Austin mayoral election was held on May 13, 2006, to elect the mayor of Austin, Texas. It saw the reelection of incumbent mayor Will Wynn.

== Election results ==
Results
Party	Candidate	Votes	%
Nonpartisan	Will Wynn (incumbent)	41,498	78.08
Nonpartisan	Danny Thomas	8,093	15.23
Nonpartisan	Jennifer Gale	3,560	6.70
Turnout		53,151	
