= Jacob M. Harrell =

Former mayor of Austin, Texas, USA

7th Mayor of Austin
- In office 1847–1849
- Preceded by: James M. Long
- Succeeded by: Samuel G. Haynie

Personal details
- Born: 1804 Tennessee
- Died: 1853 (aged 48–49) Round Rock, Texas
- Spouse: Mary McCutcheon
- Children: 4
- Occupation: Politician; blacksmith

Jacob M. Harrell was a politician and blacksmith who served as the 7th mayor of Austin. He was an early settler to the Austin area and a key figure in the early development of Round Rock, Texas.

== Early life ==
Harrell was born in Tennessee in 1804 and migrated to Texas with Robertson's Nashville colony in 1833 along with his wife and four children. In 1838, Harrell and his family became some of the first settlers to the Waterloo colony in present-day Austin.

== Career ==
Harrell held several political offices during his first few years in Austin including as alderman in 1840 and as county commissioner from 1845 to 1846. He was later elected mayor of Austin in 1847 and served for a year, after which he moved again to a new plot of land to the north located along Brushy Creek.

Harrell Cemetery in Round Rock, Texas

Between 1848 and 1853, he sold of portions of his property in one acre plots upon which the homes and businesses of old town Round Rock were built. Among these was a log cabin that would serve as the area's first school. On his remaining property, he built a log cabin, a blacksmith shop, and other services for travelers to the area.

== Personal life ==
Jacob Harrell married Mary McCutcheon and the couple had four children.

== Death and Legacy ==
Harrell died at his home in Round Rock, Texas in 1853. He was buried in his family cemetery plot, Harrell Cemetery, which remains today alongside the graves of other members of the Harrell family. In 1999, a historical marker was erected at the location of the cemetery.
