= Night Hawk (restaurant) =

Restaurant information
- Established: 1932
- Closed: 2018
- Food type: Hamburgers and steaks

Night Hawk was a restaurant chain founded by Harry Akin in 1932 in Austin, Texas. Its last location closed in 2018.

== History ==
=== Early history ===
The first Night Hawk restaurant, located at the site of a former fruit stand on Congress Avenue and Riverside Drive, was opened by Harry Akin in 1932. Akin had been unable to find work during the Great Depression and decided to open a hamburger restaurant to earn a living. The original location had two booths and eight barstools at its lunch counter.

Akin named the restaurant the Night Hawk because he wanted to cater to customers who were awake late into the night, considering himself to be a "night bird". The chain became known for offering free coffee to customers between midnight and 6 a.m. It developed a reputation for quality, and for a period of time Akin raised and butchered his own cattle for beef. In 1935, the first location was destroyed by flooding, but was extensively repaired.

=== Expansion ===
In 1933, Akin bought an old cafe at 1907 Guadalupe St. for $100 and opened the second Night Hawk location there. It became popular with students at the nearby University of Texas at Austin.

In 1953, he opened a Night Hawk restaurant on Koenig Lane and Burnet Road. The restaurant was named "The Frisco Shop".

Over the time, the restaurant developed from a relaxed, hamburger restaurant into a more upscale chain that served steaks. The chain was known for its high standards for employee training, and many of its employees went on to become notable restaurateurs. At its height, the chain had seven restaurants, including steakhouses in San Antonio and Houston. Akin began selling frozen charbroiled steaks to restaurants and later established a line of frozen dinners in 1964.

Singer Toni Price worked at the chain during her early career.

=== Civil rights policies ===
Akin enforced progressive policies at his restaurants,providing equal opportunity employment to Black and female employees and allowing them to hold management positions. He also promoted equal customer service. The chain were the first restaurants in Austin to serve African-American customers. Akin was reportedly influenced by Johnson to begin serving Black customers.

Akin persuaded many other restaurant owners and executives to end discrimination in their establishments. In June 1963, Akin was one of several restaurateurs who visited the White House to convince John F. Kennedy to work on desegregating the service industry. That year, the Texas Observer reported that Akin led a group of restaurateurs that desegregated 27 Austin restaurants. The restaurant was patronized by celebrities including US President Lyndon B. Johnson, André the Giant, Donna Douglas, and James Arness. Johnson reportedly sent his personal cooks to train at the Night Hawk so that they could prepare Frisco hamburgers the same way.

=== Death of Akin and decline ===
Akin died in 1976, and his widow Lela Jane Akin Tinstman took over the chain. As of 1980, five of the chain's seven location had closed. Changing tastes and dining patterns were attributed to the chain's loss of popularity.

The original location was destroyed again in 1985 by a grease fire that got out of control. The restaurant was rebuilt and reopened two years later, but was unable to find a steady clientele because the renovated space was unfamiliar and the city had received an influx of new arrivals who did not have an attachment to the restaurant. The frozen food brand was sold to Charles Hill in 1989, and was moved from its original location in Austin to a larger plant in Buda, Texas in 1993.

=== Frisco restaurant ===
In 1994, the Frisco location was purchased by Akin's nephew R. Harry Akin, who owned the restaurant with his wife Julia. The restaurant was renovated three times to accommodate extra seating for customers, and moved to a new location in 2008. It was the longest-running Night Hawk location and the last one left operating, before its closure in 2018.

== Description ==
The restaurant served hamburgers and steaks. The trimmings left from butchering the steaks were used to make the chain's famous "Top Chop't" steak patties. The Frisco Burger was served with sweet relish and Russian dressing. It also serves various sides, Tex-Mex food, and pies. Its menu also included breakfast dishes like "eggs blindfolded", which was described as a cross between a poached egg and a fried egg, and "decorated eggs" which were covered with chili and beans.

== In popular culture ==
In 2007, Texan singer and columnist Kinky Friedman wrote that "if Texas were ever destroyed in a terrorist nuclear attack, three things would be sure to survive. In San Antonio, there'd be the Alamo. In Dallas, there'd be Tom Landry's hat. In Austin, there'd be the Night Hawk on Burnet Road."
