= Frank C. Cooksey =

American public servant (1933–2025)

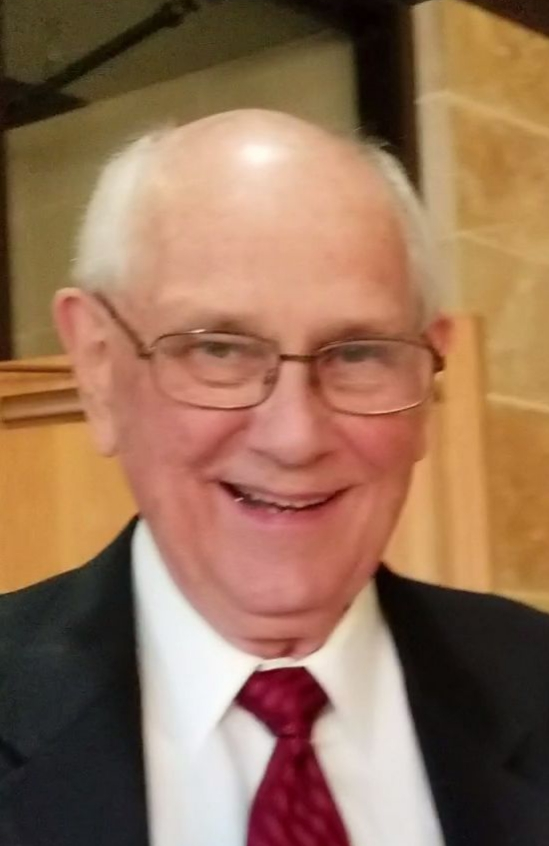
- Cooksey in 2019

51st Mayor of Austin
- In office 1985–1988
- Preceded by: Ron Mullen
- Succeeded by: Lee Cooke

Personal details
- Born: Frank Cloud Cooksey; June 3, 1933
- Died: December 15, 2025 (aged 92)
- Party: Democratic
- Spouse: Lynn Cooksey
- Profession: Attorney

Frank Cloud Cooksey (June 3, 1933 – December 15, 2025) was an American lawyer and Democratic politician who served as the 51st mayor of Austin from 1985 to 1988.

After attending the University of Texas, where he was student body president, Cooksey worked as an attorney in the Civil Rights division of the U.S. Attorney's office, the Texas Attorney General's office (under John Hill) and in private practice. He served as mayor of Austin, Texas from 1985 to 1988. He was also an environmental activist, and was known for his progressive stance during his term as mayor.

Cooksey died on 15 December 2025 at the age of 92 from complications of a fall in which he sustained a head injury.
