= Austin Convention Center =

Multi-purpose convention center

Coordinates: 30°15′45.10″N 97°44′24.43″W

Neal Kocurek Memorial Austin Convention Center
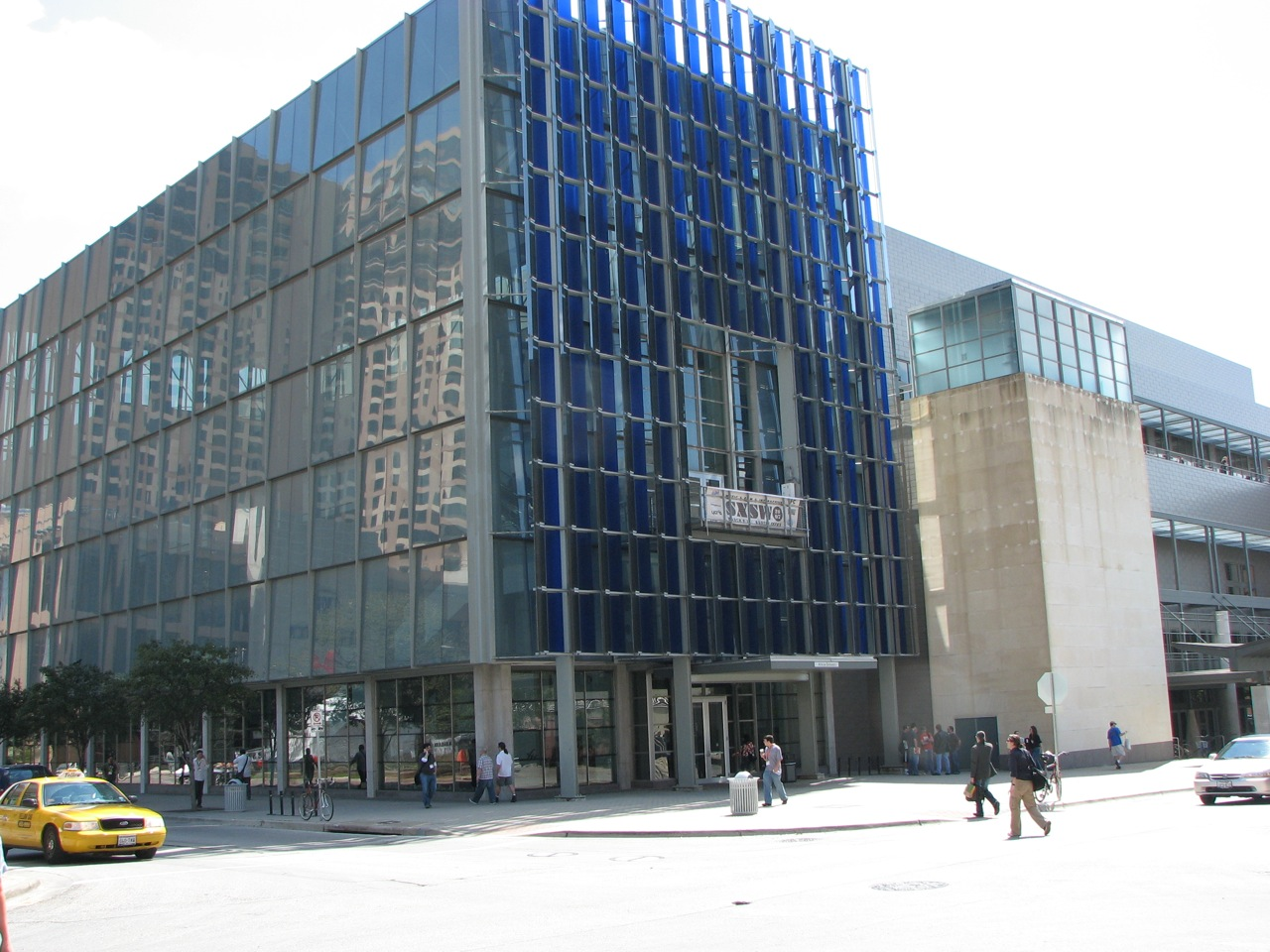
- Convention center seen from northwest corner
- Interactive map of Neal Kocurek Memorial Austin Convention Center
- Former names: Austin Convention Center (1992–2004)
- Address: 500 E Cesar Chavez St; Austin, Texas 78701
- Owner: City of Austin

Construction
- Built: 1989–1992
- Opened: July 4, 1992
- Renovated: 1999, 2002, 2010, 2011
- Cost: $35 million

Website
- Venue Website

The Neal Kocurek Memorial Austin Convention Center was a multi-purpose convention center located in Austin, Texas, United States. The building was the home of the Texas Rollergirls, and was also home to the Austin Toros basketball team, until their move to the Cedar Park Center in nearby Cedar Park in 2010. The facility was also the primary "home base" for the internationally renowned South by Southwest technology, music and film conference/festival, held annually in March.

The old Austin Convention Center was demolished from April 2025 to October 2025 to facilitate the construction of a significantly larger replacement facility. This $1.6 billion project aims to double the convention center's size, with an anticipated completion and opening in 2029. Funding for the project will be derived from the convention center's existing revenue streams and a 2% increase in the hotel occupancy tax approved in 2019.

Just prior to its demolition Austin's convention center was the 60th largest in the United States despite Austin, Texas being the eleventh largest city in the United States. The convention center's capacity limitations had hindered Austin's ability to host major events, such as the Democratic National Convention, due to the absence of suitably sized venues. While the expansion is intended to address this issue, it remains uncertain whether the new facility will ultimately provide sufficient capacity for events of that scale.

Construction and operating costs over three decades are expected to be $5.6 billion, while the revenue directly generated by the new convention center, over that same time period, is expected to be $1.6 billion. Assuming those estimates are correct then that means that 80% of the hotel occupancy tax will be tied up through 2058.

In October 2025, Austin United, a political action committee whose largest donor is the Save Our Springs Alliance, submitted a petition with 20,000+ signatures, to force the City of Austin to halt construction on the new convention center until such time that it can be put on the ballot and voted on by Austin residents. After the City of Austin was unable to verify a random sampling of 25% of the petitions signatures, the petition was denied. In December 2025, two months after the demolition had concluded, Austin United filed suit alleging that signatures were incorrectly disqualified and in February 2026 the Travis County District Court ruled against the plaintiffs.

== History ==
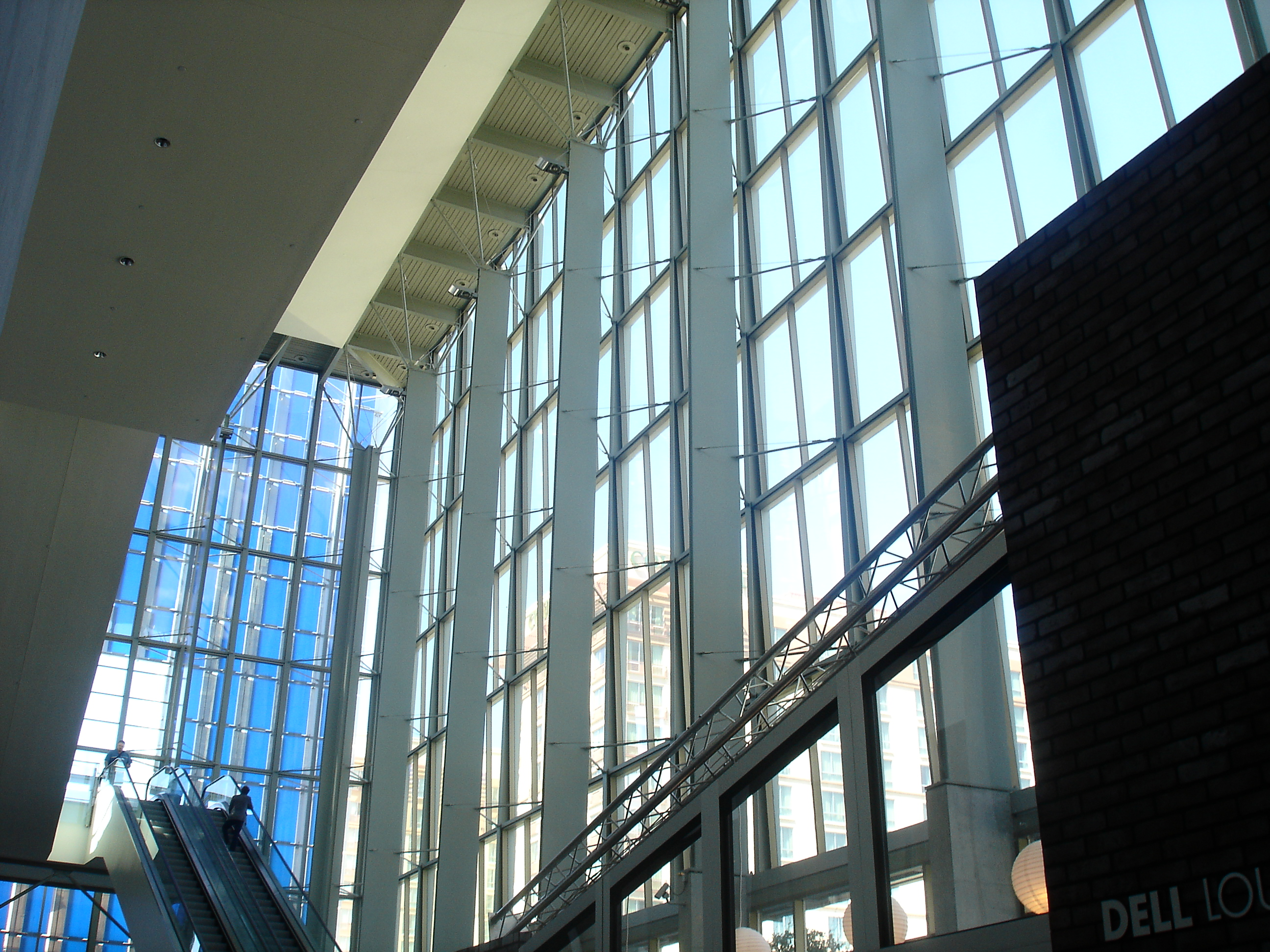
The Austin Convention Center interior

In the early 1980s civic leaders became concerned that Austin was being passed over as a site for major conventions because the city's main event facility, Palmer Auditorium, was too small. In 1983 the city council unveiled a concept for a $35 million convention center as part of a $350 million complex of hotels and parkland on the south shore of Town Lake (now Lady Bird Lake). Resistance to this plan by neighborhood groups near the proposed site and downtown business leaders caused the city to consider several other sites, finally choosing a downtown site near Waller Creek for construction. Financing was provided for by a US$69 million bond sale, approved by referendum on July 29, 1989. The grand opening ceremony took place on July 4, 1992.

On September 1, 1999, construction began on an expansion aimed at nearly doubling the size of the facility from 441,000 square feet (41,000 m^{2}) to 881,400 square feet (81,880 m^{2}). The grand reopening took place on May 18, 2002. The enlarged Convention Center's five exhibit halls have a combined 247,052 square feet (22,951.9 m^{2}) of column-free space. There are 54 meeting rooms and two ballrooms, including one of the largest ballrooms in Texas with 40,510 square feet (3,764 m^{2}).

The Austin City Council changed the name of the Austin Convention Center on July 29, 2004, to honor civic leader Dr. W. Neal Kocurek (1936–2004), who helped rally community support for construction of a convention center for Austin. Kocurek died after suffering a stroke on March 29, 2004. The formal dedication took place on December 2, 2004.

On February 22, 2007, former NBA player and Naismith Memorial Basketball Hall of Fame member Dennis Johnson suffered a heart attack outside the convention center after a practice by the Austin Toros basketball team. Johnson, who was the Toros' head coach, died later that day.
