= Barton Springs Bridge =

Bridge in Austin, Texas, U.S.

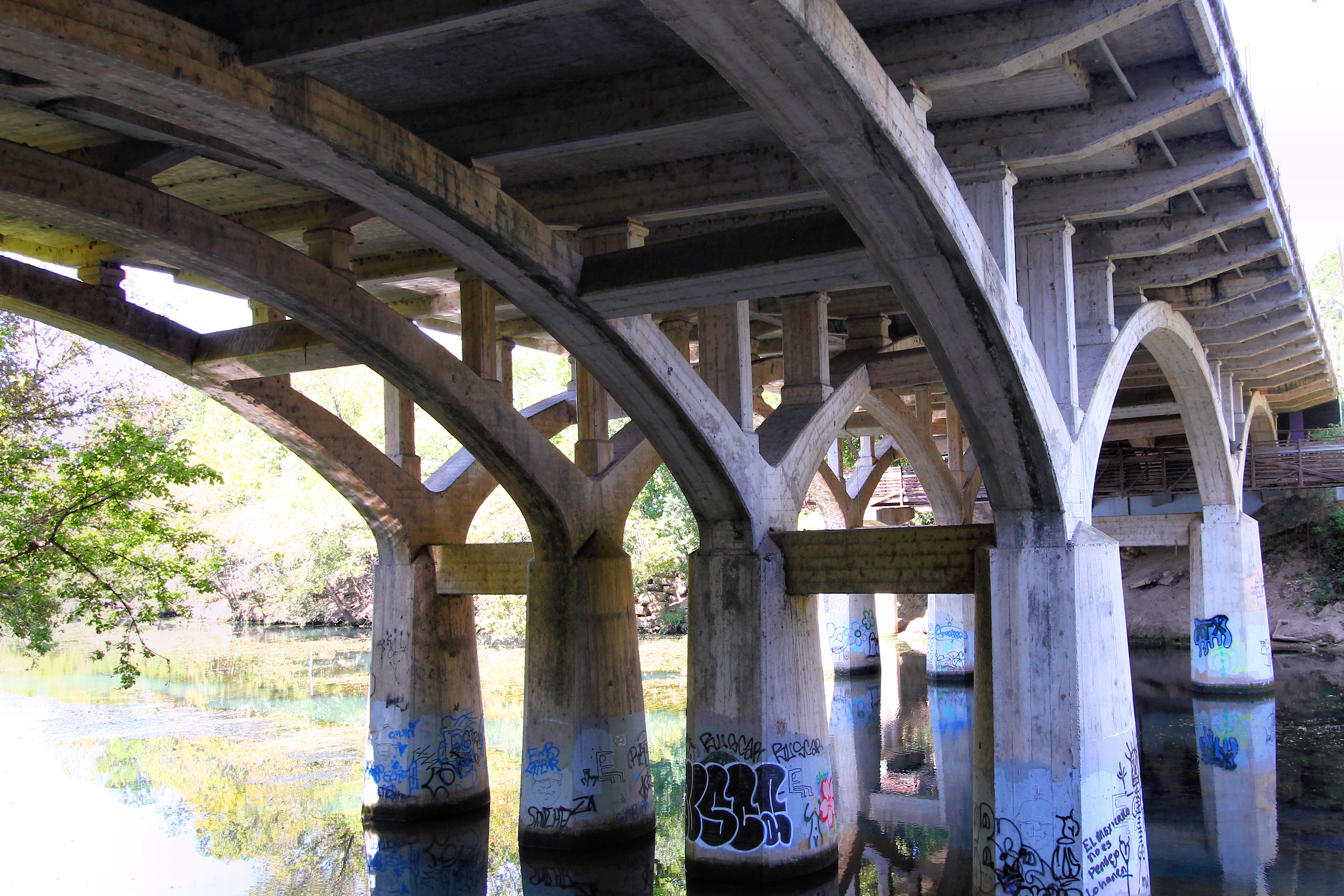
- Barton Springs Bridge substructure
- Coordinates: 30°15′54″N 97°45′55″W
- Crosses: Barton Creek
- Locale: Austin, Texas, United States

History
- Construction start: 1926
- Opened: 1926

Statistics
- Daily traffic: ~20,000

Location
- Interactive map of Barton Springs Bridge

Barton Springs Bridge is a bridge in Austin, Texas, United States that crosses Barton Creek just before its confluence with the Colorado River. The western end of the bride connects to Zilker Park.

Built in 1926 as a two lane bridge at a cost of $31,500, Barton Springs Bridge replaced an earlier wooden bridge. From 1945 to 1946 the bridge was expanded to four lanes at a cost of $70,850.

On December 14, 2023, amid concrete degradation and non-compliance with the standards established in the Americans with Disabilities Act of 1990 the Austin City Council voted to begin design work on a replacement bridge.

In October 2024, the United States Department of Transportation's Federal Highway Administration awarded a $32 million grant for the Barton Springs Bridge replacement project. The 2025 U.S. federal government grant pause left the grant in an uncertain status until a protective order was issued. On April 24, 2025, Austin City Council voted to accept the federal grant funds.

In June 2026 the Save Our Springs Alliance began to organize a petition to "save" the bridge.
