= Joseph W. Robertson =

Former mayor of Austin, Texas, USA

5th Mayor of Austin
- In office 1843–1845
- Preceded by: Asa Brigham
- Succeeded by: James M. Long

Member of the Congress of the Republic of Texas from Bastrop
- In office 1839–1840

Personal details
- Born: Joseph William Robertson; 9 February 1809 South Carolina, US
- Died: 15 August 1870 (aged 61) Austin, Texas, US
- Spouses: Ann Philips; Lydia Lee (m. 1842)
- Children: 2
- Occupation: Doctor; politician; Texas Ranger

Joseph W. Robertson was an American medical doctor and politician who served in the Congress of the Republic of Texas from 1839 to 1840 and as the fifth mayor of Austin from 1843 to 1845.

== Early life ==
Joseph W. Robertson was born in South Carolina on February 9, 1809. He studied at Transylvania University in Lexington, Kentucky.

== Career ==
Following his university studies, Robertson moved to Alabama where he established a medical practice. In 1839, he moved to Bastrop County, Texas where he briefly served in the Texas Rangers and represented Bastrop in the House of Representatives of the Fourth Congress of the Republic of Texas. Following the end of his term, Robertson and his family moved to Austin.

In Austin, Robertson established a pharmaceutical practice on Congress Avenue where he marketed an original formulation of medical bitters as a panacea for various diseases and disabilities. In 1842, he volunteered as an Army surgeon and in 1843 he was elected as the fourth mayor of Austin for which he served one year.

== Personal life ==
Robertson married Ann Philips and the couple had two children. Following the death of his wife and daughter in 1841, he married Lydia Lee. While living in Austin, he purchased the French Legation building and 21 acres of property that formerly belonged to Alphonse Dubois de Saligny.

== Death and legacy ==
Robertson died on August 15, 1870. His grave is located at Oakwood Cemetery in Austin, Texas.
