= Roy Butler (American politician) =

American mayor and businessman

47th Mayor of Austin
- In office 1971–1975
- Preceded by: Travis LaRue
- Succeeded by: Jeff Friedman

Personal details
- Born: March 31, 1926 Greenville, Texas, U.S.
- Died: November 13, 2009 (aged 83) Austin, Texas, U.S.
- Party: Republican
- Profession: Businessman and politician

Military service
- Allegiance: United States
- Branch/service: United States Navy
- Battles/wars: World War II

Roy Anderson Butler, Sr. (March 31, 1926 – November 13, 2009), was an American politician and businessman who served as the 47th mayor of Austin from 1971 to 1975.

Butler was the first Austin mayor directly elected by city voters. Prior to his 1971 election, Austin mayors had been appointed by the Austin City Council.

== Personal life ==
Roy Butler was a native of Greenville, Texas. He was the only child of his mother, a homemaker, and his father, an officer in the United States Army.

Butler served in the United States Navy during World War II. Following his departure from the Navy, Butler earned his bachelor's degree in economics from the University of Texas at Austin in 1951. He attended the University of Texas School of Law for three years but left before earning his law degree. Instead, he entered the automobile business.

He met his future wife, Ann Showers, on a blind date while at the University of Texas. The couple married six months later.

Butler was described as a close friend of former U. S. President Lyndon B. Johnson.

== Business career ==
Outside of city politics, Butler owned and operated several prolific Austin area businesses. He opened his first car dealership at 45th and Lamar in Austin. The business grew to become the Roy Butler Lincoln-Mercury dealership. Butler owned the dealership from 1960 until 1976, during which Butler Lincoln-Mercury became the largest Lincoln dealership in Texas and Oklahoma.

Butler won the rights to the Coors Beer franchise in Central Texas in 1976, beating out approximately 2,200 other applicants. His Coors beer distributor franchise, now called Capitol Beverage, currently distributes more than forty beer brands throughout four Texas counties, as of 2009 in Caldwell, Hays, Travis, and Williamson counties.

Butler co-founded the local branch of Cellular One, which is now known as AT&T Wireless. Cellular One was the first cell phone provider in Austin. He also owned two Austin area radio stations, KVET and KASE-FM. Under Butler, KVET and KASE-FM expanded into a multi-state radio group, which Butler sold in 1999.

Former Austin Mayor Bruce Todd credited Butler as one of the real estate developers most responsible for transforming Downtown Austin. Butler established some of the first, and most important commercial developments in the neighborhood, which eventually attracted new residents and businesses to the area. Butler was responsible for leasing a building he owned at the corner of Sixth and Lamar to both Whole Foods Markets and the GSD&M Idea City ad agency, both of which are headquartered in Austin. With the addition of another tenant, Book People, Butler's property became an important site which attracted people to downtown Austin.

== Political career ==
Butler served as a member of the Austin independent school District board for nine years prior to being elected to his first term as mayor in 1971.

Butler unseated Mayor Travis LaRue 65.3 to 15 percent. He was handily re-elected for a second two-year term as mayor in 1973, when he received almost 44,000 votes. This total from 1973 still holds the record for most votes ever cast for any Austin mayoral candidate in history, as of 2019.

Butler expanded and modernized the Austin Police Department. He also spearheaded efforts to build a nuclear power plant in South Texas and construct the Texas State Highway Loop 1 (MoPac Boulevard) on the west side of Austin. The two proposals brought Butler into political conflict with Austin's environmentalists, who had emerged as a force in the city during the 1960s and 1970s.

During his tenure as mayor, Butler was able to recruit former United States First Lady Lady Bird Johnson to team up with his wife, Ann Butler, to establish the Town Lake Beautification Committee. Before Ann Butler and First Lady Johnson began their work the lake, located in Austin, was in a state of neglect and polluted with trash and overgrown weeds. KTBC described Town Lake before Butler's efforts as an "eyesore". Efforts by Johnson and Butler transformed Town Lake and the adjoining Town Lake Hike and Bike Trail, into one of the most important recreation areas in Austin. Town Lake was renamed Lady Bird Lake in 2007, and the Hike and Bike Trail was renamed Butler Trail in 2012.

Contrary to some belief, Austin's Butler Park is not named for Roy Butler, but rather for Michael Butler, the founder of the Elgin-Butler Brick Company.

== Later life ==
Butler was a strong advocate of law enforcement. On August 28, 2009, the Austin City Council and the Austin Crime Commission renamed a police academy to the Roy Butler Police Training Academy in honor of Butler and his work in support of the police.

Roy Butler suffered two broken vertebrae in a fall in early November 2009. He was taken to the University Medical Center Brackenridge and listed in critical condition. Butler died from complications of his injuries approximately one week later on November 13, 2009, at the age of 83.

He was survived by his wife of 61 years, Ann; three children, Roy Butler Jr., Edward Butler, and Beth Granger; and his grandchildren: Sheridan Butler, Grant Butler, Charles Granger, Louis Granger, and Roy Granger.

Butler's memorial service was held at the Lyndon Baines Johnson Library in Austin on November 19, 2009.

Mayor Travis LaRue, whom Butler unseated in 1971, died on Saturday, November 14, 2009, just one day after Butler's passing.

== In memoriam ==
On November 3, 2011, the Austin City Council, in recognition of Roy Butler's civil service and contributions to the community and City of Austin, including the revitalization and improvement of Lady Bird Lake (formerly Town Lake), approved a resolution naming the "hike and bike trail" surrounding Lady Bird Lake in downtown Austin as the "Ann and Roy Butler Hike and Bike Trail."
