= Harry Akin =

American politician and restaurateur (1903–1976)

45th Mayor of Austin
- In office 1967–1969
- Appointed by: Austin City Council
- Preceded by: Lester E. Palmer
- Succeeded by: Travis LaRue

Personal details
- Born: Robert Harry Akin Jr. September 3, 1903 Taylor, Texas, U.S.
- Died: April 16, 1976 (aged 72)
- Spouse: Bonnie Mae Wheat (before 1944) Josephine Dunlop (m. 1944; died 1966) Lela Jane Schueler Sumner (m. 1967)
- Occupation: Founder of the Night Hawk restaurant chain

Robert Harry Akin Jr. (September 3, 1903 – April 16, 1976) was an American restaurateur and politician who served as the 45th mayor of Austin from 1967 to 1969. He founded the Night Hawk restaurant chain, and was a leading advocate for racial integration and equal opportunity hiring practices in the restaurant industry.

== Early life ==
Robert Harry Akin Jr. was born in Taylor, Texas on September 3, 1903. His parents were Robert Harry Akin Sr. and Ollie S. Akin. While studying medicine at the University of Texas, he joined the Curtain Club and later left university to be part of a travelling tent show. The tent show travelled to California in the hopes of breaking into the film industry. However, by the time they arrived, the popularity of tent shows had been eclipsed by sound films. Akin picked up small acting roles in Hollywood while also working at hamburger restaurants as a cook and waiter.

== Night Hawk restaurants ==
After abandoning his acting career during the Great Depression, Akin returned to Texas in 1932. Unable to find a job, he converted an abandoned fruit stand into a hamburger counter and opened the first Night Hawk restaurant in Austin. It grew into a successful hamburger restaurant chain, with seven locations at its height. He purchased a cattle ranch to supply his own beef, which meant the chain was less affected by beef shortages during World War II.

Several celebrities were known to patronize the restaurant, including André the Giant, Donna Douglas, and James Arness. Lyndon B. Johnson reportedly sent his personal cooks to the restaurant and asked Akin to train them so that they could prepare the restaurant's "Frisco Burgers".

In 1964, Akin established the Night Hawk frozen food chain, which sold the restaurant's "Top Chop't steaks" in grocery stores.

Akin served in several civic organizations. He was president of the Austin Rotary Club from 1950 to 1951, before serving as president of the National Restaurant Association, vice president of the International Association of Hotel, Restaurant and Cafe Owners, and founder of the Austin Restaurant Association.

=== Desegregation and equal employment ===
Akin was known for implementing hiring policies that were inclusive of African Americans and women. He hired women and minorities as early as 1935, making him one of the first restaurant owners in Austin to do so. Akin began serving Black customers at his restaurants in 1958 and helped lead efforts to desegregate Austin restaurants in the 1960s.

He was a close friend and early supporter of future US President Lyndon B. Johnson. According to Neal Spelce, Johnson encouraged Akin to integrate his restaurants by serving Black customers, saying "You've got to lead on this, Harry. We've got to serve Negroes."

In 1963, President John F. Kennedy approached Akin and asked him to use his influence as president of the National Restaurant Association to lead desegregation. Kennedy sought to end the segregation of public spaces and decrease racial tensions. In response, Akin desegregated the Night Hawk location near the University of Texas at Austin, allowing Black students from the university to eat there. Other Austin restaurateurs followed Akin's example by desegregating. By the end of 1963, Akin led a consortium of 55 restaurants that had desegregated. Together, those restaurants accounted for about 70% of all restaurant meals served in Austin.

Over the course of 1963 and 1964, Akin met with Kennedy, Johnson, and Attorney General Robert F. Kennedy to discuss voluntary desegregation.

== Mayor of Austin ==
Akin ran for a seat on the Austin City Council in 1965 but was unsuccessful. He ran again and won in 1967, and was appointed Mayor of Austin. At the time, the mayor was appointed by the City Council. He served as mayor from 1967 until 1969.

After the assassination of Martin Luther King Jr. on April 4, 1968, Akin personally visited Black-owned businesses in Austin to speak with residents.

Akin was a major prominent of fair policies, seeking to end housing discrimination against Austin racial minorities. He was opposed by the Board of Realtors. On May 17, 1968, the Austin City Council passed an ordinance to ensure fair housing. A petition signed by 26,000 residents who opposed it triggered a referendum to vote on the ordinance. Akin supported the ordinance but it was voted down amidst low voter turnout. Akin blamed the result and low turnout on the fact that the vote occurred on October 19, 1968, the same day as a major football game between the Texas Longhorns and Arkansas Razorbacks. Akin's fair housing policies were mainly defeated, and he was pushed out of local politics.

After losing the 1969 Austin City Council elections, Akin retired from politics.

== Personal life ==
Akin was married three times. His first marriage to Bonnie Mae Wheat ended sometime before 1944, when he married Josephine Dunlop. Josephine died in 1966. He married Lela Jane Schueler Sumner in 1967.

== Death ==
Akin died on April 16, 1976. After his death, the Night Hawk chain was owned by his widow Lela Jane. The chain went into decline and most locations closed in the following years. The last Night Hawk restaurant location, owned by his nephew R. Harry Akin, closed in 2018.
