= Moses Johnson =

Former mayor of Austin, Texas, USA

4th Treasurer of the Republic of Texas
- In office December 14, 1844 – February 19, 1846
- Preceded by: Asa Brigham
- Succeeded by: Office abolished

3rd Mayor of Austin
- In office 1841–1842
- Preceded by: Thomas W. Ward
- Succeeded by: Asa Brigham

Personal details
- Born: 1808 Virginia, U.S.
- Died: October 22, 1853 (aged 44–45) Port Lavaca, Texas, U.S.
- Spouse: Olivia Huggins
- Children: 4
- Occupation: Doctor; public servant; politician

Moses Johnson was an American doctor and politician who served as the third mayor of Austin from 1841 to 1842 and as the fourth treasurer of the Republic of Texas from 1844 to 1846.

== Early life ==
Moses Johnson was born in Virginia in 1808. He enlisted as an ensign in the Thirty-first Regiment of Infantry in New York in 1832 and served until his discharge on April 8, 1833. After leaving the military, Johnson studied medicine in Woodstock, New York.

== Career ==
After finishing his studies, Johnson moved to Knoxville, Illinois where he established a medical practice. Several years later, in the late 1830s, he emigrated with his family to the Republic of Texas where he was given permission by Ashbel Smith to practice medicine and surgery in Harrisburg and Liberty counties. Within a few years, he moved again to the city of Austin.

Shortly after relocating, Johnson was elected to be the third mayor of Austin and appointed Justice of the Peace, positions for which he served from 1841 until 1842. Following his term as mayor he was made grand marshal of the Grand Lodge of Texas and appointed treasurer of the Republic of Texas by Texas president Anson Jones. Later, he was appointed inspector and collector of revenue for the port of Lavaca.

== Personal life ==
Moses Johnson married Olivia Huggins in the mid-1830s. They had four children. In 1845, Johnson's Austin home was destroyed in a fire.

== Death and Legacy ==
Moses Johnson died of yellow fever on October 2, 1853. In 1975, a historical marker was erected in his honor near his grave in Port Lavaca. Today, a collection of his personal documents and professional correspondence are held in the Dolph Briscoe Center for American History on the University of Texas campus.
