= Samuel G. Haynie =

8th & 18th Mayor of Austin
- In office 1850–1852
- Preceded by: Jacob M. Harrell
- Succeeded by: George J. Durham
- In office 1863–1865
- Preceded by: James W. Smith
- Succeeded by: Thomas W. Ward

Member of the Texas House of Representatives
- In office December 13, 1847 – November 5, 1849

Member of the Congress of the Republic of Texas from Travis County
- In office 1840–1842

Personal details
- Born: Samuel Garner Haynie; April 23, 1806 Knoxville, Tennessee
- Died: May 20, 1877 (aged 71) Travis County, Texas
- Spouse: Hannah Maria Evans
- Children: 8
- Occupation: Politician; doctor

Samuel G. Haynie was an American politician and medical doctor who served as the 8th and 18th mayor of Austin from 1850 to 1852 and from 1863 to 1865. He also served in both the Republic of Texas and State of Texas legislatures.

== Early life ==
Haynie was born to Reverend John Haynie and Elizabeth Brooks in Knoxville, Tennessee, on April 23, 1806. He lived for many years in Tuscumbia, Alabama emigrating to Texas in 1837.

== Career ==
Haynie held numerous public positions while living in Texas. He represented Travis County in the Republic of Texas Fifth Congress from 1840–42. He was postmaster of Austin from 1846 to 1852. He then represented Travis County again in the Second Texas Legislature in 1847. Most notably, he was elected four times as mayor of Austin in two non-consecutive stints from 1850-52 and 1863-65. Outside of government, he also became director of the Sons of Temperance in 1850.

Haynie had numerous business and financial interests including a pharmacy and a large mercantile company named Samuel G. Haynie & Co. Following his political career, Haynie graduated from the Medical Department of Soule University at Galveston in 1871, and practiced medicine until his death.

== Personal life ==
Samuel Haynie married Hannah Maria Evans and the couple had eight children - three sons and five daughters. He was a close friend and personal physician to Samuel Houston.

In 1852, Haynie commissioned esteemed local architect Abner Cook to build a large two-story home in downtown Austin. However, he was forced to sell the house shortly after he was completed due to personal financial difficulties. The site of the house, known today as the Haynie-Cook House, is designated by a historical marker that was erected in 2010.

== Death and Legacy ==
Samuel Haynie died on May 20, 1877 in Travis County, Texas. He is buried at the Oakwood Cemetery in Travis County. In 2010, a historical marker was erected at the site of the Haynie-Cook House in downtown Austin.
