= Travis LaRue =

American politician

46th Mayor of Austin
- In office 1969–1971
- Preceded by: Harry Akin
- Succeeded by: Roy Butler

Personal details
- Born: January 6, 1913
- Died: November 14, 2009 (aged 96)
- Profession: Politician

Military service
- Allegiance: United States
- Branch/service: United States Army
- Battles/wars: World War II

Travis Leldon LaRue (January 6, 1913 – November 14, 2009) was an American politician who served as the 46th mayor of Austin from 1969 to 1971. LaRue was the last Mayor of Austin to be elected by Austin City Council rather than a direct election by city voters.

LaRue was elected Mayor by the Austin City Council in 1969, becoming the last mayor to be chosen by the city council. In 1971, LaRue ran for a second term in Austin's first direct mayoral election. However, LaRue was soundly defeated by challenger Roy Butler in a landslide election. Butler received 65% of the voter, while incumbent Mayor LaRue garnered just 15%.

LaRue died on November 14, 2009, at the age of 96. A private memorial service was held at the Weed-Corley-Fish funeral home in Austin. In a statement, Mayor Lee Leffingwell expressed condolences on LaRue's death, "Mayor LaRue served during a period when the City Council chose one of their own to serve as mayor. As a public servant, Mayor Larue dedicated much of his time and energy to ensuring the welfare of our community. Our deepest condolences go out to the family of Mayor Travis Larue."

LaRue died just one day after the death of his successor as Mayor of Austin, Roy Butler. Butler died of complications from a fall on November 13, 2009, at the age of 83.
