= Lee Cooke =

American politician and businessman

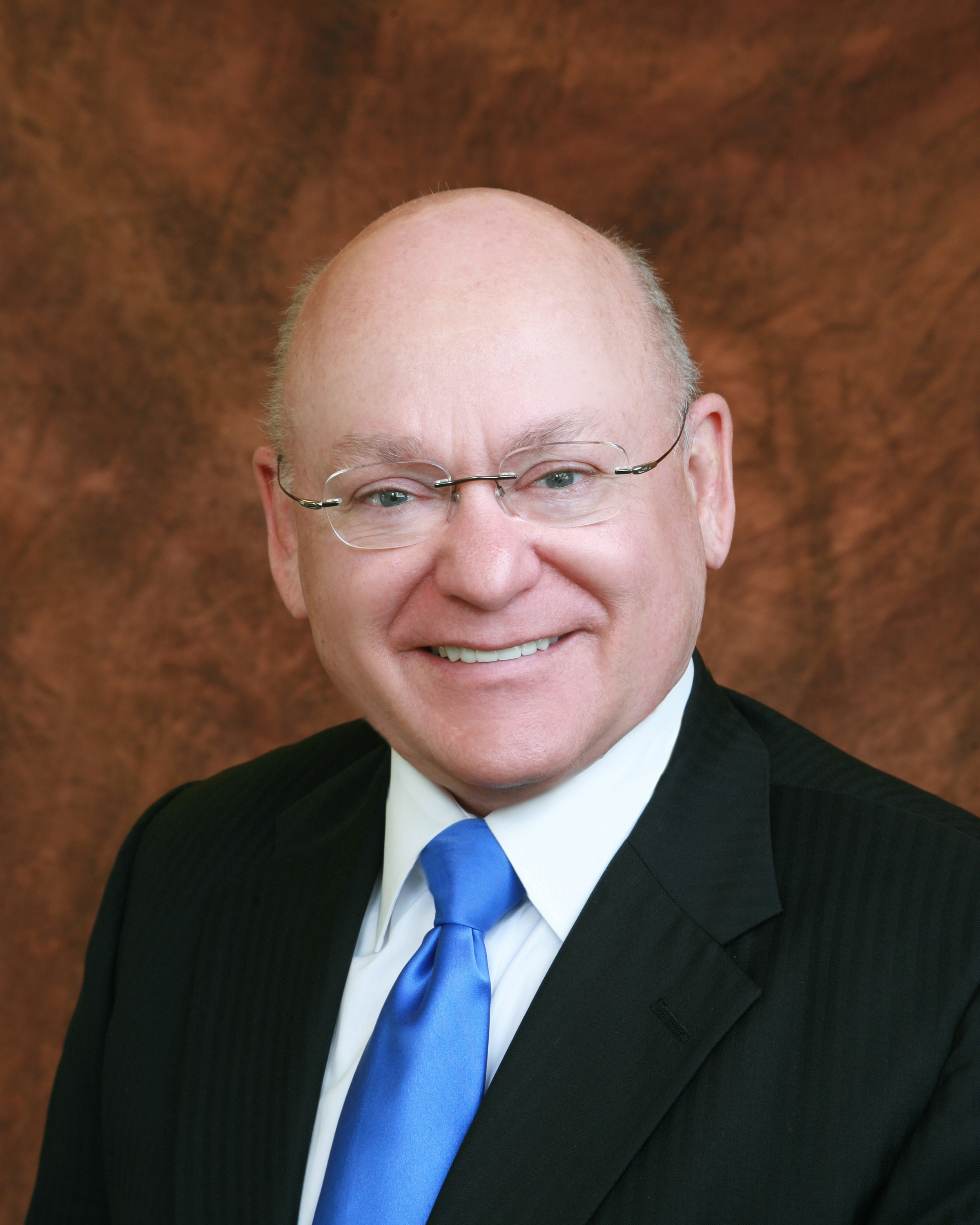

52nd Mayor of Austin
- In office June 15, 1988 – June 15, 1991
- Preceded by: Frank C. Cooksey
- Succeeded by: Bruce Todd

Member of the Austin City Council
- In office 1977–1981

Personal details
- Born: Carlton Lee Cooke; 1944 (age 81–82) Marion, Alabama, U.S.
- Party: Republican
- Children: 1
- Education: Louisiana Tech University (BA)

Military service
- Branch/service: United States Air Force
- Rank: Captain
- War: Vietnam War
- Awards: Bronze Star Medal

Carlton Lee Cooke (born 1944) is an American politician and businessman who served as the 52nd mayor of Austin from 1988 to 1991. A member of the Republican Party, Cooke was described by The Austin Chronicle as a "business-booster". As of 2025, Cooke is the last Republican mayor of Austin.

== Education and career ==
After initially attending the University of Hawaii, Cooke received a BA from Louisiana Tech University in 1966.

Cooke served as an Air Force intelligence officer during the Vietnam War and received the Bronze Star Medal. He is a former employee of the Texas Instruments from 1972 to 1983. Cooke served on Austin City Council for two terms from 1977 until 1981 leading the modern plan which revitalized downtown. Describing himself as a "conservative businessman", Cooke's highlights included a new convention center, expansion by Motorola (NXP), IBM and AMD, the approval of 44 miles of freeway, refocus location of the airport to the closing Bergstrom AFB site and creation of the Austin Technology Incubator during his tenure as mayor.

He was President/CEO of the Greater Austin Chamber of Commerce from 1983 to 1987. During his tenure, a new strategy for a more diverse economy with emphasis on technology research, software development, music-film-conventions in addition to government, education and services was adopted.
