= Ron Mullen =

American politician

50th Mayor of Austin
- In office 1983–1985
- Preceded by: John Treviño Jr. (acting)
- Succeeded by: Frank C. Cooksey

Member of the Austin City Council
- In office 1977–1983

Personal details
- Born: 1939 (age 86–87) Arlington, Texas, U.S.
- Spouse(s): Caroline Elizabeth King (m. 1959; died 2019) Lynnda Carter (m. 2021)
- Profession: Financial Advisor/CLU, ChFC, CWS

Ron Mullen (born 1939) is an American politician who served as the 50th mayor of Austin from 1983 to 1985. He also served on Austin City Council from 1977 to 1983. He is an insurance broker. Mullen was married to Caroline Elizabeth King from December 29, 1959 until her death in November 19, 2019. Mullen remarried to Lynnda Carter on July 25, 2021.
