= Mayor of Austin =

Head of the Austin, Texas municipal government

- Flag of the City of Austin

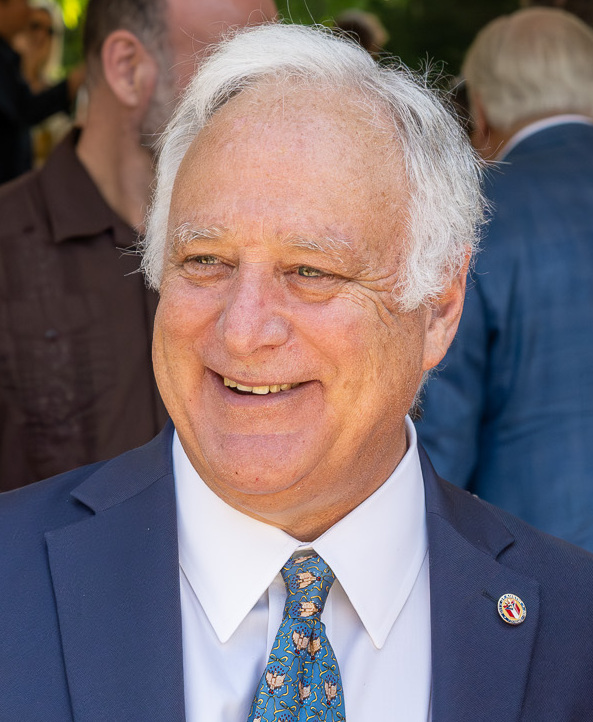
- Incumbent; Kirk Watson since January 6, 2023
- Residence: Private residence
- Term length: Four years renewable once
- Inaugural holder: Edwin Waller
- Formation: 1840
- Salary: $134,191
- Website: austintexas.gov/mayor

The mayor of Austin is the official head of the city of Austin in the U.S. state of Texas. The office was established in 1840 after Austin incorporated as a city in 1839. The mayor of Austin is elected to a four-year term and limited to serving no more than two terms.

Kirk Watson took office as mayor on January 6, 2023, for a third term and was re-elected to a fourth term in 2024, having served as mayor from 1997 to 2001.

== Duties and powers ==
Austin has a council–manager form of government which means day-to-day operations of the city are run by the city manager. The mayor is the head of city government ceremonially. The mayor is technically a member of the city council and is required to preside at all meetings. The mayor is also allowed to vote on all matters that come before the city council, but has no veto powers.

As of fiscal year 2022–2023, the salary for the mayor is set at $134,191.

== Election ==
The mayor is elected in a citywide election. Currently, elections occur every four years during even-numbered years. Elections are non-partisan and by majority, but if no candidate receives a majority a run-off election is called between the top two candidates who received the most votes.

== Succession ==
Per city code of ordinances, if the mayor is absent or disabled, the Mayor Pro Tem is to act as mayor until the mayor returns or an election is held to fill the vacancy.

The mayor is subject to recall by registered voters if a petition is signed and filed that contains the signatures of 10 percent of the qualified voters. If the petition is verified, a recall election is called at the earliest convenient available date. If the recall passes, the mayor immediately vacates office. There are two limitations to the recall process. First, no recall petition can be filed until the mayor has been in office for at least six months. Second, the mayor will not be subject to more than one recall.

== List of mayors of Austin ==
No.	Mayor	Took office	Left office	Tenure	Party	Election
1	Edwin Waller (1800–1881)	January 1840	August 1840	6–7 months	Unknown	TBA
2	Thomas W. Ward (1807–1872); 1st time	August 1840	1841	3–4 months	Unknown	TBA
3	Moses Johnson (1808–1853)	1841	1842	1 year	Unknown	TBA
4	Asa Brigham (1788–1844)	1842	1843	1 year	Unknown	TBA
5	Joseph W. Robertson (1809–1870)	1843	1845	2 years	Unknown	TBA
6	James M. Long (TBA–TBA)	1845	1847	2 years	Unknown	TBA
7	Jacob M. Harrell (1804–1853)	1847	1849	2 years	Unknown	TBA
8	Samuel G. Haynie (1806–1877); 1st time	1850	1852	2 years	Unknown	TBA
9	George J. Durham (TBA–TBA)	1852	1853	1 year	Unknown	TBA
10	Thomas W. Ward (1807–1872); 2nd time	1853	1853 (Note: Ward resigned to accept an appointment by President Franklin Pierce as United States consul to Panama.)	>1 year	Unknown	TBA
11	William P. DeNormandie (TBA–TBA)	1853	1854	1 year	Unknown	TBA
12	John Salmon Ford (1815–1897)	1854	1855	1 year	Unknown	TBA
13	John Treadwell Cleveland (TBA–TBA)	1855	1856	1 year	Unknown	TBA
14	Edward R. Peck (TBA–TBA)	1856	1857	1 year	Unknown	TBA
15	Thomas F. Sneed (TBA–TBA)	1857	1858	1 year	Unknown	TBA
16	Ben F. Carter (1831–1863)	1858	1860	2 years	Unknown	TBA
17	James W. Smith (TBA–TBA)	1860	1863	3 years	Unknown	TBA
18	Samuel G. Haynie (1806–1877); 2nd time	1863	1865	2 years	Unknown	TBA
19	Thomas W. Ward (1807–1872); 3rd time	1865	1866	1 year	Unknown	TBA
20	William H. Carr (TBA–TBA)	1866	1867	1 year	Unknown	TBA
21	Leander Brown (TBA–TBA)	1867	1871	4 years	Unknown	TBA
22	John W. Glenn (TBA–TBA)	1871	1872	1 year	Unknown	TBA
23	Thomas Benton Wheeler (1840–1913)	1872	1877	5 years	Democratic	TBA
24	Jacob Carl DeGress (TBA–TBA)	1877	1879	2 years	Unknown	TBA
25	William A. Saylor (1843–1887); 1st time	1879	1881	2 years	Unknown	TBA
26	L. M. Crooker (TBA–TBA)	1881	1883	2 years	Unknown	TBA
27	William A. Saylor (1843–1887); 2nd time	1883	1884	1 year	Unknown	TBA
28	John W. Robertson (TBA–TBA)	1884	1887	3 years	Unknown	TBA
29	Joseph Nalle (TBA–TBA)	1887	1890	3 years	Unknown	TBA
30	John McDonald (TBA–TBA)	1890	1895	5 years	Unknown	TBA
31	Louis Hancock (TBA–TBA)	1896	1897	1 year	Unknown	TBA
32	John Dodd McCall (TBA–TBA)	1897	1901	4 years	Unknown	TBA
33	Robert E. White (TBA–TBA)	1901	1905	4 years	Unknown	TBA
34	William D. Shelley (TBA–TBA)	1905	1907	2 years	Unknown	TBA
35	Frank M. Maddox (TBA–TBA)	1907	1909	2 years	Unknown	TBA
36	Alexander Penn Wooldridge (1847–1930)	1909	1919	10 years	Unknown	TBA
37	William D. Yett (TBA–TBA)	1919	1926	7 years	Unknown	TBA
38	Paul W. McFadden (TBA–TBA)	1926	1933	7 years	Unknown	TBA
39	Robert Thomas Miller (1893–1962); 1st time	1933	1949	16 years	Unknown	TBA
40	Taylor Glass (TBA–TBA)	1949	1951	2 years	Unknown	TBA
41	William S. Drake Jr. (1909–1967)	1951	1953	2 years	Unknown	TBA
42	Charles A. McAden (1902–1958)	1953	1955	2 years	Unknown	TBA
43	Robert Thomas Miller (1893–1962); 2nd time	1955	1961	6 years	Unknown	TBA
44	Lester E. Palmer (1908–2003)	1961	1967	6 years	Unknown	TBA
45	Harry Akin (1903–1976)	1967	1969	2 years	Unknown	TBA
46	Travis LaRue (1913–2009)	1969	1971	2 years	Unknown	TBA
47	Roy Butler (1926–2009)	1971	1975	4 years	Republican	TBA
48	Jeffrey Friedman (1945–2007)	May 15, 1975	May 15, 1977	2 years, 0 days	Democratic	TBA
49	Carole McClellan (1939–2025)	May 15, 1977	February 25, 1983	5 years, 286 days	Democratic	TBA
–	John Treviño Jr. (1938–2017); Acting	February 1983	May 1983	3 months	Unknown	–
50	Ron Mullen (born 1939)	May 1983	1985	1–2 years	Unknown (Note: In 1994, Mullen contributed $250 to the campaign of Jo Baylor, a Republican congressional candidate.)	TBA
51	Frank C. Cooksey (1933–2025)	1985	June 15, 1988	2–3 years	Democratic	TBA
52	Lee Cooke (born 1944)	June 15, 1988	June 15, 1991	3 years, 0 days	Republican	TBA
53	Bruce Todd (1949–2021)	June 15, 1991	June 15, 1997	6 years, 0 days	Democratic	TBA
54	Kirk Watson (born 1958); 1st time	June 15, 1997	November 9, 2001	4 years, 147 days	Democratic	TBA
55	Gustavo L. Garcia (1934–2018)	November 9, 2001	June 16, 2003	1 year, 219 days	Democratic	2001 special
56	Will Wynn (born 1961)	June 16, 2003	June 22, 2009	6 years, 6 days	Democratic	2003
56	Will Wynn (born 1961)	June 16, 2003	June 22, 2009	6 years, 6 days	Democratic	2006
57	Lee Leffingwell (born 1939)	June 22, 2009	January 6, 2015	5 years, 198 days	Democratic	2009
57	Lee Leffingwell (born 1939)	June 22, 2009	January 6, 2015	5 years, 198 days	Democratic	2012
58	Steve Adler (born 1956)	January 6, 2015	January 6, 2023	8 years, 0 days	Democratic	2014
58	Steve Adler (born 1956)	January 6, 2015	January 6, 2023	8 years, 0 days	Democratic	2018
59	Kirk Watson (born 1958); 2nd time	January 6, 2023	Incumbent	3 years, 315 days	Democratic	2022
59	Kirk Watson (born 1958); 2nd time	January 6, 2023	Incumbent	3 years, 315 days	Democratic	2024

== See also ==
- Austin City Council
- Austin City Hall (Austin, Texas)
