= 1847 Connecticut lieutenant gubernatorial election =

- April 7, 1847
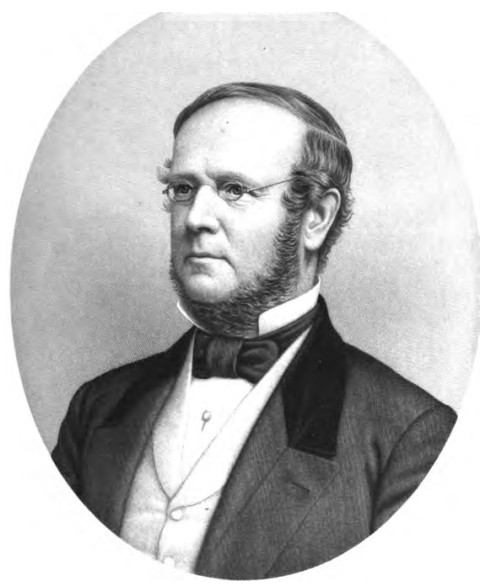

Nominee	Charles J. McCurdy	George S. Catlin
Party	Whig	Democratic
Popular vote	29,609	27,135
Percentage	49.70%	45.50%
Lieutenant Governor before election
Noyes Billings
Democratic
Elected Lieutenant Governor
Charles J. McCurdy
Whig

The 1847 Connecticut lieutenant gubernatorial election was held on April 7, 1847, to elect the lieutenant governor of Connecticut. Whig nominee and former Speaker of the Connecticut House of Representatives Charles J. McCurdy received a plurality of the votes against Democratic nominee and former member of the U.S. House of Representatives from Connecticut's 3rd district George S. Catlin. However, since no candidate received a majority in the popular vote, Charles J. McCurdy was elected by the Connecticut General Assembly per the Connecticut Charter of 1662.

== General election ==
On election day, April 7, 1847, Whig nominee Charles J. McCurdy won a plurality of the vote by a margin of 2,474 votes against his foremost opponent Democratic nominee George S. Catlin. However, as no candidate received a majority of the vote, the election was forwarded to the Connecticut General Assembly, who elected Charles J. McCurdy, thereby gaining Whig control over the office of lieutenant governor. McCurdy was sworn in as the 40th lieutenant governor of Connecticut on May 5, 1847.

=== Results ===
Connecticut lieutenant gubernatorial election, 1847
Party	Candidate	Votes	%
Whig	Charles J. McCurdy	29,609	49.70
Democratic	George S. Catlin	27,135	45.50
	Scattering	2,852	4.80
Total votes		59,596	100.00
Whig gain from Democratic			
