= Alexander Penn Wooldridge =

American lawyer

36th Mayor of Austin
- In office 1909–1919
- Preceded by: Frank M. Maddox
- Succeeded by: William D. Yett

Personal details
- Born: April 13, 1847 New Orleans, Louisiana, U.S.
- Died: September 8, 1930 (aged 83) Austin, Texas, U.S.
- Spouses: Ellen Waggener (m. 1874; died 1903) Nellie Wylie Holde (m. 1917)
- Children: 7
- Education: University of Virginia

Alexander Penn Wooldridge (April 13, 1847 – September 8, 1930) was an American politician and attorney who served as the 36th mayor of Austin from 1909 to 1919.

== Biography ==
Wooldridge was born in New Orleans on April 13, 1847, to Absalom and Julia Webber Davis. After graduating from the University of Virginia, he became a professor of physical science at Bethel College. In 1872, Wooldridge moved to Austin, Texas, where he became an attorney.

In the early 1890s, he led the campaign to build the Austin Dam across the Colorado River; the dam failed in a flood in 1900. Wooldridge was the president of Austin's City National Bank in 1896 and also served as the first President of the Board of Trustees of the Austin Independent School District. He is sometimes called "The Father of Public Education in Austin." In 1909, he was elected as Mayor of Austin. During his tenure, the Spanish Flu epidemic of 1918 occurred. At the height of the epidemic, the city passed an ordinance closing the state university, all public and private schools, and all churches for a period of 30 days. He retired from the position in 1919.

Wooldridge died on September 8, 1930, in Austin, Texas. he is buried in Oakwood Cemetery.

== Personal life ==
On September 18, 1874, Wooldridge married Ellen Waggener. They had seven children together. After her death, he married Nellie Wylie Holden on July 9, 1917. Wooldridge Park and Wooldridge Elementary School are named after him.
