= Wooldridge, South Africa =

Wooldridge
- Location within Eastern Cape Location within South Africa
- Coordinates: 33.221°S 27.246°E
- Country: South Africa
- Province: Eastern Cape
- District: Amathole
- Municipality: Ngqushwa

Area
  - Total: 4.89 km^{2} (1.89 sq mi)

Population (2011)
  - Total: 179
  - Density: 36.6/km^{2} (94.8/sq mi)

Racial makeup (2011)
  - Black African: 99.4%
  - White: 0.6%

First languages (2011)
  - Xhosa: 98.9%
  - Other: 1.1%
- Time zone: UTC+2 (SAST)

Wooldridge is a town in Amathole District Municipality in the Eastern Cape province of South Africa.

The village is 16 km east of Peddie. It developed from a settlement of the German Legion. It was named after Colonel J W Wooldridge who was an officer under Baron von Stutterheim.
