= Thomas W. Ward =

Former mayor of Austin, Texas, USA

Thomas William Ward
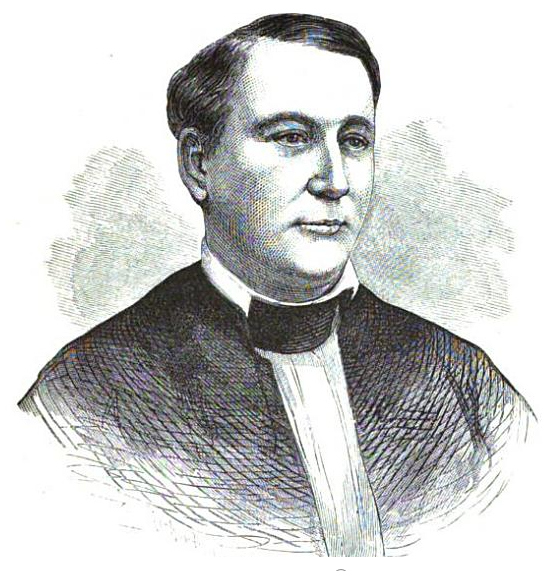
- Thomas William Ward

United States Consul to Panama
- In office October 1853 – August 1856
- President: Franklin Pierce

3rd Land Commissioner of Texas
- In office January 4, 1841 – March 20, 1848
- Preceded by: H. W. Raglin
- Succeeded by: George W. Smyth

2nd, 10th & 19th Mayor of Austin
- In office August 1840 – 1841
- Preceded by: Edwin Waller
- Succeeded by: Moses Johnson
- In office 1853
- Preceded by: George J. Durham
- Succeeded by: William P. DeNormandie
- In office 1865 – February 1866
- Preceded by: Samuel G. Haynie
- Succeeded by: William H. Carr

Postmaster of Houston
- In office April 1839 – October 1839

Member of the Harrisburg County Board of Land Commissioners
- In office 1838–1839

Personal details
- Born: June 20, 1807 Dublin, Ireland
- Died: November 25, 1872 (aged 65) Austin, Texas, U.S.
- Citizenship: Irish, Texan, American
- Spouse: Susan L. Ward (m. 1844)
- Children: 4
- Occupation: Carpenter; building contractor; politician

Thomas William (Peg Leg) Ward (June 20, 1807 – November 25, 1872) was an Irish-born American soldier and politician who served three nonconsecutive terms as the mayor of Austin between 1840 and 1866. Ward also served as the 3rd commissioner of the Texas General Land Office from 1841 to 1848 and as the United States consul to Panama from 1853 to 1856.

== Early life ==
Thomas William Ward was born in Dublin to Henry and Frances Ward on June 20, 1807. His parents were Anglo-Irish Protestants. Thomas was baptized at St. Mary’s, a church associated with famous persons, including Richard Brinsley Sheridan, John Wesley, Wolfe Tone, and Arthur Guinness. Ward grew up in a large family in a prosperous neighborhood on Moore Street with four older siblings and five younger ones. His father Henry was a successful building contractor. He obtained a commission for construction at Botany Bay, a square at Trinity College. The building contract including the extension of an existing four-story building and adding a new four story-structure to the other side of the square. He started the project in 1813 and finished four years later.

Thomas trained as a carpenter and learned the business of contracting under the tutelage of his father. At age twenty, he moved with his family from Dublin to Rathvilly, County Carlow. In 1828 Ward sailed to Quebec before making his way to New Orleans. Though his obituary would later aver that he practiced as an architect and an engineer, his biographer dismisses this and says that he worked in New Orleans as a carpenter. In 1831 he was hired by a builder to work on a major expansion of house, including the addition of a kitchen, and a second story with a garret. This house was still extant at 709-711 Royal Street as recently as 2009.

== Career ==
=== Military service ===
On October 13, 1835, Ward attended a meeting on Magazine Street organized by opposition to the regime of Antonio López de Santa Anna. Among those recruiting volunteers for war against Mexico were Adolphus Sterne and Orazio de Santagelo. Enough volunteers signed up that night to create the New Orleans Greys, and Ward joined as a private. The first company embarked on a steamer to Texas via the Red River, and marched from north Texas to San Antonio de Béxar. Ward embarked with his company on the schooner ‘’Columbus’’ which navigated the Mississippi River and the Gulf of Mexico to the mouth of the Brazos River, still about 250 miles short of the final destination of San Antonio. They boarded sixty-five soldiers and two cannon onto the steamer ’’Laura’’, which took them upstream on the Brazos. This still left a substantial overland journey through Victoria and Goliad, where the company acquired horses. Once they reached San Antonio, they lingered for a few weeks, where they continued to train for an assault. Ward learned to fire the cannon and was promoted from private to lieutenant.

On December 5, the Texas forces launched an attack devised by Ben Milam. With a cannon sortie on the Alamo to distract the Mexican defenders east of the San Antonio River, the Texians’ assaulted the town with two division from the north marching into San Antonio on parallel streets. Ward was attached to a force of seven companies led by Milam, and Francis Johnson was in command of the other group made up of eight infantry companies. The Texians assembled hours before sunrise. The artillery company attached to Milam’s command hauled two cannon. The feint started at 5 a.m. with the firing of a third cannon from another direction. The attackers stormed two houses near the main plaza to use for cover, but faced Mexican rifleman and seven artillery pieces. The two Texian cannons were targets for the counterattack, and Ward was hit by a cannon ball while defending the twelve-pound piece, shattering his right leg. The injury called urgently for amputation. Under primitive camp conditions, Albert Levy, the surgeon for the New Orleans Greys, sawed off Ward’s leg and wrapped the wound shut with excess muscle and skin. Survival rates for this type of operation were sixty percent under the best of conditions.

Ben Milam died from rifle fire during the assault and legend has it that Milam's body and Ward's leg were buried in the same grave. Ward’s biographer, David C. Humphrey, claims that this story is recorded for the first time in Texas: Her Resources and Her Public Men, published in 1858. This book included a brief biographical entry about Ward. In addition to the legend of Ward’s right leg, this is the source of the claims that Ward was an organizer of the Grays and that he was in command of his artillery unit. Humphrey disputes these characterizations. While recovering from the amputation, however, Ward traveled overland to Velasco and sailed for New Orleans. Eventually he healed enough and obtained a wooded prosthesis, and rejoined the military as a recruiter in April 1836.

Commissioned as a colonel by President David G. Burnet, Ward served under Gen. Thomas J. Rusk. For his service to the Republic of Texas, Ward later received 2,240 acres in Grayson and Goliad counties.

=== Houston developer ===
After the Texas Revolution, Ward settled in Houston and worked as a general contractor. Augustus Allen, one of the founders of Houston, met with Ward in New Orleans early in 1837 to discuss construction projects. Ward secured a $4,000 letter of credit, and on February 18, 1837, Allen hired Ward as a contractor to build the Texas capitol in Houston. Allen also engaged Ward to build a smaller building known as the Long Row, which was to be used as a backup plan, and Ward completed this building in short order. According to one account, work did not commence until April 16, just two weeks before Congress was due to meet on May 1. When the Second Session of the 1st Congress of the Republic of Texas convened, the building was not yet finished, as reported by John James Audubon, "We amused ourselves by walking to the capitol, which was yet without a roof, and the floors, benches, and tables of both houses of Congress were as well saturated with water as our clothes had been in the morning." Even though the Long Row was complete and the capitol building was not, Congress started its session in a building without a roof. Ward's capitol building was only used by the Texas government for a few years, but it was arguably one of Houston's finest buildings. For decades it was operated as a hotel, though extant photographs show the building after various renovations and expansions.

In 1838, Ward started a law practice specializing in land grants and estates. He also acquired 8,000 acres of Texas land through grants related to his contributions to Texas independence. The same year Ward served as a member to the Harrisburg (Harris) County's Board of Land Commissioners. He lost his re-election bid the next year, and also unsuccessfully challenged Robert Wilson for a Texas Senate seat.

=== Land agent ===
Ward agreed to serve as postmaster to the city of Houston in April 1839, just one day before the Texas government announced its plan to move the capital to Waterloo, later renamed as Austin. He remained on the job until October, but followed the Texas government to Austin around that time. Ward suffered another great personal tragedy on March 2, 1840, during a celebration of Texas Independence Day. He and a comrade from the New Orleans Greys, John D. McLeod, agreed to fire the old six-pound cannon as part of the day's festivities. The cannon fired by accident just as Ward was ramming the muzzle, causing severe damage to his right side. His right arm was amputated to save his life. After about month of bed rest, Ward was out in public, and by the end of the summer, the town of Austin elected him as its second mayor. Despite losing both a leg and an arm to cannon charges, he honored the re-election of Sam Houston in 1841 by firing another artillery piece.

=== Republic of Texas Politics ===
During the spring and summer of 1839, the capitol was moved to Waterloo, later renamed Austin. Ward followed the seat of government and in late 1839 served as the chief clerk for the House of Representatives during the Fourth Congress. He went on to become the second mayor of Austin in the fall of 1840 when Edwin Waller stepped down. During his brief tenure in the winter of 1840, Ward created eight districts with a representative from each serving on the city council. He also coordinated the sale of town lots.

In January 1841 he was appointed the second (Note: While many sources describe him as the second commissioner, in the official numbering of Commissioners he is considered the third, since it includes H. W. Raglin's role as interim commissioner prior to Ward's appointment in the count) commissioner of the Texas General Land Office, succeeding John P. Borden. Ward presided over the land office until 1848. Throughout his term, he struggled to make sense of the often unclear and tangled land laws as well as the nightmare of conflicting surveys and untrained surveyors. The commissioner also had to combat rampant fraud and wrestle with dishonorable land speculators. Early on, Ward discovered that the job of land commissioner could be quite hazardous to one's health.

The following year Ward was a party to the Texas Archive War. The Texas government evacuated to Houston in response to the Mexican invasion of Texas and the capture of San Antonio. Residents of Austin refused to release the government archives, and Ward worked with President Sam Houston to move the archives from Austin. For his trouble, Ward was among those fired upon by Angelina Eberly.

When Ward's term as Land Commissioner expired in 1848, the legislature elected George Smyth instead of Ward.

=== Local politics ===
In 1853 he was elected the 10th mayor of Austin but resigned in September to accept an appointment by President Franklin Pierce as United States consul to Panama.

He returned to the United States in 1857 and, despite declining health, was nonetheless active in the election of 1860 as a bitter opponent of secession.

In 1865 Andrew J. Hamilton appointed him mayor of Austin (19th), his third time to hold the post over a 25-year period. While he did serve as mayor of the capitol of Texas three times, he never completed a single year in any of these terms. In October he left Austin to serve as Andrew Johnson's appointee as Corpus Christi's customs collector. He remained in this position until 1869 when Ulysses S. Grant fired him.

== Personal life ==
Ward was active in the Independent Order of Odd Fellows. The Houston Free Masons rejected his membership application, but he directed his energies toward the Odd Fellows, and even organized the Lone Star Lodge in Houston.

On June 20, 1844, Ward married Susan L. (Bean) Marston, a native of Candia, New Hampshire. Susan had married Dr. Thomas Marston and moved with him to Texas, where she became a widow with two children. The couple had four children before Susan separated from the house in 1858. She filed a lawsuit for a legal separation and alimony in 1859, in a protracted action without resolution.

In 1846, Ward hired Abner H. Cook, his neighbor, to construct a new home at the northwest corner of Hickory and Guadalupe. Since Ward was trained as a builder-architect in his own right, he conceived of a general plan reminiscent of the house for the French Legation, but lacking both an arm and a leg, commissioned Cook to consult on the plan and oversee the construction of the house. In 1847, completed a house with a central hall plan, flanked on each side with a room including a fireplace.

== Death and legacy ==
Ward contracted typhoid fever and died on November 25, 1872, in his Austin home. He is interred at the Texas State Cemetery, with a granite headstone marking the grave site which was commissioned by the State of Texas in 1932.

The first county seat of Johnson County was named Wardville in his honor of his service as Texas Land Commissioner. Ward County, Texas, created in 1887, was also named in his honor fifteen years after his death.

== Bibliography ==
- Hafertepe, Kenneth (1992). Abner Cook: Master Builder on the Texas Frontier. Austin: Texas State Historical Press. ISBN 0-87611-102-9.
- Humphrey, David C. (2009). Peg Leg: The Improbable Life of a Texas Hero, Thomas William Ward, 1807–1872. Denton, Texas: Texas State Historical Association. ISBN 978-0-87611-237-3.
- Schmidt, James M. Galveston and the Civil War. Charleston, SC: History Press. ISBN 978-1-60949-283-0.
- Terrell, Alex W. (October 1910). "The City of Austin from 1839 to 1865". The Quarterly of the Texas State Historical Association. 14 (2): 113–128. JSTOR 30243064.
