= Carole Keeton Strayhorn =

American politician (1939–2025)

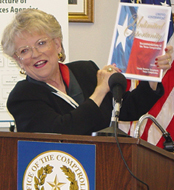

36th Comptroller of Texas
- In office January 20, 1999 – January 20, 2007
- Governor: George W. Bush; Rick Perry
- Preceded by: John Sharp
- Succeeded by: Susan Combs

Railroad Commissioner of Texas
- In office December 10, 1994 – January 3, 1999
- Governor: Ann Richards; George W. Bush
- Preceded by: Mary Scott Nabers
- Succeeded by: Michael Williams

49th Mayor of Austin
- In office May 15, 1977 – February 25, 1983
- Preceded by: Jeff Friedman
- Succeeded by: John Treviño Jr. (acting)

Personal details
- Born: Carole Stewart Keeton; September 13, 1939 Austin, Texas, U.S.
- Died: March 26, 2025 (aged 85) Austin, Texas, U.S.
- Party: Democratic (before 1986, 2014–2025)
- Other political affiliations: Republican (1986–2006); Independent (2006–2014)
- Spouse(s): Barr McClellan (divorced); Curtis Rylander (divorced); Ed Strayhorn (divorced)
- Children: 4, including Scott and Mark
- Parent: W. Page Keeton (father)
- Education: University of Texas at Austin (BA)

Carole Stewart Keeton (September 13, 1939 – March 26, 2025), formerly known as Carole Keeton McClellan, Carole Keeton Rylander and Carole Keeton Strayhorn, was an American politician who served as the 49th mayor of Austin from 1977 to 1983, as a member of the Railroad Commission of Texas from 1994 to 1999, and as the 36th Texas comptroller of public accounts from 1999 to 2007.

Elected to the comptroller's post in 1998 as a Republican, Keeton ran as an independent candidate for Texas governor against Republican incumbent Rick Perry in 2006. She lost the November general election to Perry and placed third in a six-way race, with 18 percent.

Keeton was notable for several firsts in Austin and Texas politics. She was the first and so far, only woman elected as Mayor of Austin and the first Austin mayor elected to three consecutive terms. She was the first woman elected to the Texas Railroad Commission and the first woman elected as comptroller. She also was the first woman to serve as president of the Austin school board and as president of the Austin Community College board.

In May 2009, Keeton lost her campaign for Mayor of Austin.

== Background ==
Keeton was born Carole Stewart Keeton in Austin, the second child and only daughter of Madge Anna (Stewart) and W. Page Keeton, a lawyer and university dean. She attended the University of Texas at Austin, where she was a member of the Orange Jackets, a women's honorary service organization. Her father was the longtime dean of the University of Texas Law School. Keeton was a member of the Junior League of Austin, TX.

Keeton's first marriage was to attorney Barr McClellan, whom she divorced during her first term as mayor. The marriage produced four sons, Scott, Mark, Brad, and Dudley McClellan. Upon her subsequent remarriage, she took the last name of her new husband, accordingly elected as comptroller under the name Carole Keeton Rylander. She married Ed Strayhorn in 2003, continuing her career as Carole Keeton Strayhorn. She resumed her maiden name by 2014, after her third marriage ended in divorce.

== Early political career ==
As Carole Keeton McClellan, she served on the board of trustees of the Austin Independent School District (which doubled as the Board of Trustees of Austin Community College) from 1972 to 1977. She served as president of both boards from 1976 to 1977. She was elected mayor of Austin in 1977 and held that post until 1983. In 1983, Governor Mark White appointed Rylander to the State Board of Insurance, where she served until resigning in 1986 to unsuccessfully challenge veteran Democratic congressman, J. J. Pickle of Austin, a longtime friend and political ally of Lyndon B. Johnson.

As Carole Keeton Rylander, she won election to the Texas Railroad Commission in 1994 by beating Democratic incumbent Mary Scott Nabers, an Ann W. Richards appointee, by almost 300,000 votes. The panel primarily regulates the production of oil and natural gas, and despite its name, no longer has authority over railroads. She served as commission chairman from November 1995 to January 1997, and from June 1998 to January 1999.

== Comptroller ==
In 1998, Keeton entered the open race to succeed outgoing Democratic Comptroller John Sharp of Victoria, who was seeking the lieutenant governorship. Facing off against Democratic political scion Paul Hobby, the son of a former lieutenant governor, Keeton won by some 20,000 votes out of roughly 3.6 million votes cast.

Reelected in 2002, she led the statewide Republican ticket in terms of raw votes. As Carole Keeton Rylander, she drew more than one million votes more in 2002 than she had four years earlier and outpolled fellow Republican Rick Perry by some 246,000 votes even while Perry was easily dispatching Democrat Tony Sanchez of Laredo in the governor's race.

The tax status of Ethical Societies as religious organizations has been upheld in court cases in Washington, D.C. (1957), and in Austin, Texas (2003). The Texas State Appeals Court said of the challenge by then state comptroller Keeton, "the Comptroller's test [requiring a group to demonstrate its belief in a Supreme Being] fails to include the whole range of belief systems that may, in our diverse and pluralistic society, merit the First Amendment's protection."

In 2004, Keeton revoked the tax-exempt status of the Unitarian Universalist Church in Denison, Texas by claiming that the church is not a religion. This move was done because of the policies of the church's parent body, the Unitarian Universalist Association, which has no single set of religious teachings. The comptroller's office reversed its decision after the Fort Worth Star-Telegram reported the incident. This was the only occasion when any U.S. state attempted to deny the church's tax exemption.

== Gubernatorial campaign ==
Soon after the 2002 election, Keeton began publicly feuding with Governor Perry over what she saw as his inability to provide leadership on issues such as school finance and government spending.

On May 9, 2006, Keeton turned in 223,000 voter signatures to the office of Texas Secretary of State Roger Williams. Only 45,540 were required to place her on the November general election ballot. "I told you, Texas," Keeton said while standing in front of 101 boxes stuffed with signatures. "We have blown the barn doors off this petition drive." Media reports later confirmed that the boxes were substantially less than half full (for comparison, her opponent, Kinky Friedman put 169,000 signatures in 11 similar boxes). On June 22, 2006, Texas Secretary of State Roger B. Williams declared that only 108,512 signatures on her petition were valid, about 35,000 less than Friedman's count.

Keeton tried to have herself listed on the gubernatorial ballot as "Carole Keeton 'Grandma' Strayhorn", claiming that "Grandma" was a common nickname for her, and that independent opponent Kinky Friedman was able to use "Kinky" on the ballot (although he was listed as "Richard 'Kinky' Friedman"). Secretary of State Williams ruled that Keeton's "nickname" was a slogan she used during her campaign for state comptroller (One Tough Grandma). Friedman, on the other hand, had used "Kinky" as a professional name on his albums and novels, and had been known by that name for at least 40 years.

During the Texas election for Governor's debate, Keeton suffered image points when she could not name the president-elect of Mexico, Felipe Calderón, during a rapid-answer segment of the debate. In a format similar to a TV game show, the candidates had 15 seconds to answer questions. She stated that the election had been hotly contested.

== Partisan affiliations ==
In her campaigns for school board and mayor, Keeton was not identified by partisan affiliation since those posts are elected on a nonpartisan basis. Keeton was a Democrat until the mid-1980s; she served as Democratic nominee Walter Mondale's campaign chair in Travis County during the 1984 presidential election. Keeton switched parties and became a Republican in 1986, when she was the GOP nominee for the U.S. House seat held by J. J. Pickle. She was elected Railroad Commissioner and then Comptroller as a Republican and ran for Governor in 2006 as an independent. In 2014, she returned to the Democratic party nearly 30 years after having left it (source?).

== Death ==
Keeton died at her home in Austin, Texas, on March 26, 2025, at the age of 85.

== Sources ==
- Associated Press, Strayhorn: Call Me Grandma, (June 9, 2006).
- Robert Dodge, Finding a Healthy Balance: FDA Chief McClellan Aiming for Right Mix of Science, Economics, Dallas Morning News 1A (Feb. 16, 2004).
- R.G. Ratcliffe, Strayhorn says her politics remain true, Houston Chronicle (Aug. 20, 2006).
- Amy Smith, She's Her Own Grandma, Austin Chronicle (July 28, 2006).
- Texas Birth Index 1903-1997
- Texas Marriage Index, 1966–2002
- Texas Divorce Index, 1966–2002

Party political offices
Preceded by Teresa Doggett Taylor	Republican nominee for Texas Comptroller of Public Accounts; 1998, 2002	Succeeded by Susan Combs
Political offices
Preceded by Jeffrey Friedman	Mayor of Austin; 1977–1983	Succeeded by Ron Mullen
Preceded by Mary Scott Nabers	Railroad Commissioner of Texas; 1994–1999	Succeeded by Michael L. Williams
Preceded by John Sharp	Comptroller of Texas; 1999–2007	Succeeded by Susan Combs
