= Jeffrey Friedman (politician) =

American politician(1945 - 2007)

- Jeffrey Friedman

48th Mayor of Austin
- In office May 15, 1975 – May 15, 1977
- Preceded by: Roy Butler
- Succeeded by: Carole McClellan

Personal details
- Born: January 20, 1945 New York City, U.S.
- Died: June 8, 2007 (aged 62) Austin, Texas, U.S.
- Party: Democratic
- Education: University of Missouri–Kansas City; University of Texas School of Law
- Profession: Attorney, politician

Jeffrey Mark "Jeff" Friedman (January 20, 1945 – June 8, 2007) was an American politician who served as the 48th mayor of Austin from 1975 to 1977. Friedman was a campus political activist who became the youngest person ever elected to the City Council of Austin, Texas in 1971. He is best remembered as the city's so-called "hippie mayor" who led an alliance of young, ethnic, and left wing voters to capture the reins of city government in 1975 — an event that helped cement Austin's place as a liberal bastion in a conservative state and region. He was also the city's first Jewish mayor.

== Biography ==
=== Early years ===
Jeffrey Friedman was born in Queens, New York on January 20, 1945, to Sidney Friedman and the former Evalyn Oken.

He attended the University of Missouri–Kansas City, from which he graduated in 1967. Following graduation he moved to Austin, Texas to attend the University of Texas School of Law, graduating from that institution in 1970.

While still a student, Friedman became involved in the fight against the Vietnam War as a campus activist, taking a leadership role in a march of 25,0000 people in the aftermath of the May 1970 Kent State massacre.

=== Political career ===
Friedman first ran for the Austin City Council in 1971, backed by a coalition which included University of Texas students, Mexican-Americans, African Americans, and sundry supporters of a liberal reform agenda. The 26-year-old was elected in the November balloting in a close election, becoming the youngest person ever elected to the Austin City Council. Friedman's victory came largely as the result of an influx of new voters, with the legal voting age being lowered from 21 to 18 ahead of the election.

The young city councilor was selected as a delegate to the 1972 Democratic National Convention held in Miami Beach, Florida — a gathering which selected George McGovern as the party's nominee for President of the United States.

Friedman was reelected to the Austin City Council, the governing body of the city of 250,000 people, in 1973.

In 1975, Friedman ran for mayor of Austin along with a slate of liberal candidates, capturing majority control of the city government, with the 30-year-old becoming the youngest mayor in the city's history. The resulting city council was "more akin politically to Madison or Berkeley than to Dallas or Houston," opined one contemporary political observer. The rag-tag alliance that helped elect Friedman, in combination with the mayor's fashionably long hair and bushy mustache, helped earn Friedman the moniker "Austin's Hippie Mayor" among some traditionalist wags in the community.

Friedman and his co-thinkers led the fight to control urban sprawl and to increase participation in government by the minority community of Austin, challenging the business-friendly status quo and helping to reshape the city's longterm political agenda. He advocated for establishment of a public ambulance service and for equalization of electric rates in the city.

While mayor of Austin, Friedman attempted to extend his influence into the national political sphere, joining with 21 of his mayoral colleagues from around the country as signatories of an open letter to President Jimmy Carter calling upon him to stop production of the B-1 bomber.

=== Life after politics ===
After his term as mayor of Austin, Friedman retired from political life and dedicated himself to establishing a legal practice and raising a family. He coached his son Adam's little league baseball team for several years.

=== Death and legacy ===
Friedman died of a heart attack on June 8, 2007. He was 62 years old at the time of his death.

Michael R. Levy, publisher of Texas Monthly, was one of those who eulogized Friedman in the days after his death. "Jeff introduced Austin city government to democracy," Levy remarked. "To say that the city was shocked is an understatement."

== See also ==
- Mayor of Austin
- Keep Austin Weird
