= Save Our Springs Alliance =

Save Our Springs Alliance (SOS), originally called the Save Our Springs Legal Defense Fund, is a nonprofit corporation originally created to protect the citizen-drafted SOS Ordinance of 1992 to conserve Barton Springs in Austin, Texas. The ordinance was written by citizens in reaction to the city's "Composite Ordinance," which citizens regarded as insufficient to save Barton Springs.

== History ==
In 1990 Freeport-McMoRan, a mining company, threatened to develop 4,000 acres (16 km^{2}) of land it owned along Barton Creek. When it came time for City Council to approve the development, though, an all-night meeting ensued wherein citizens decried the company's actions and professed their love of Barton Springs, what many refer to as the "Soul of the City."

Today, SOS works with groups in the larger Edwards Region with a collective goal of conserving the Greater Edwards Aquifer Ecosystem, which is now chartered in the "Edwards Aquifer Protection Plan." The Edwards Aquifer is the source of water to over 4 million people, including residents of San Antonio. It also provides necessary heat relief and recreation to central Texas residents, and it is the home of many rare plant and animal species.

Six creeks run through the Barton Springs watershed: Barton Creek, Little Barton Creek, Bear Creek, Slaughter Creek, Williamson Creek, and Onion Creek. Sinkholes and other karst features allow water from these creeks to travel underground to the Aquifer. Because limestone provides no natural filtering system (unlike sandstone aquifers) it is more susceptible to pollutants in the creeks. SOS works to minimize development near these creeks, as sewage, run-off from roads and lawn fertilizers can end up in the Aquifer and come up at Barton Springs. Some of the ill effects of this pollution include a sewage smell, eutrophication (the proliferation of algae due to increased nutrients), increase turbidity (cloudiness) and harm to endangered species. Barton Creek and other lakes and rivers in Central Texas are very popular in the Austin and Edwards Aquifer region as most citizens enjoy kayaking, swimming, and other outdoor recreation.

Pursuant to Section 11(g) of the Endangered Species Act, Save Our Springs Alliance petitioned the Secretary of the Interior to list the Barton Springs Salamander as an endangered species. After a favorable ruling by the Supreme Court, the species was listed.

In 2006, a visiting judge ruled that Save Our Springs lacked standing in a suit that it had brought. SOS claimed that the Lazy 9 Municipal Utility District was created in violation of the Texas Constitution. The judge also levied $294,000 in attorney's fees against Save Our Springs, but the directors of SOS filed bankruptcy to avoid paying this judgment. Although the Court of Appeals subsequently determined that SOS did have standing to file the suit, it refused to reverse the trial court's decision on the merits and left the attorney's fees ruling intact. On motion for rehearing, the Court of Appeals affirmed its decision. The Texas Supreme Court refused the writ of appeal, determining there was no reversible error. The bankruptcy court judge denied Save Our Springs' plan to emerge from bankruptcy and dismissed the case after SOS failed to meet a deadline.

In October 2025, Save Our Springs submitted a petition to halt construction of a new Austin Convention Center and, in June 2026, Save Our Springs started collecting signatures to prevent the replacement of the Barton Springs Bridge.
