= Edwin Waller =

Texas politician

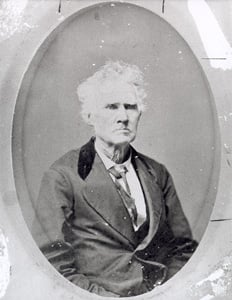

1st Mayor of Austin
- In office January 1840 – August 1840
- Preceded by: Office established
- Succeeded by: Thomas W. Ward

Personal details
- Born: Edwin Leonard Waller; November 4, 1800 Spotsylvania County, Virginia, U.S.
- Died: January 3, 1881 (aged 80) Austin, Texas, U.S.
- Resting place: Texas State Cemetery

Edwin Leonard Waller (November 4, 1800 – January 3, 1881) was an American businessman who served as the first mayor of Austin from January to August 1840. He was a signer of the Texas Declaration of Independence and the designer of Austin's grid plan.

== Texas independence ==
He was born in Spotsylvania County, Virginia, United States, in 1800 to a family settled in the state since colonial times when they emigrated from Buckinghamshire, England. His family later settled in Missouri.

In April 1831, he immigrated to the Mexican state of Coahuila y Tejas. On July 20, he received a land grant from the government in present-day Brazoria County. He began a shipping business, transporting cotton from Velasco, Texas, to New Orleans, Louisiana, using his ship, the Sabine, and was once briefly arrested in Velasco for refusing to pay Mexican customs duty.

He very quickly became active in the movement for Texas independence from Mexico. On June 26, 1832, he fought and was wounded at the Battle of Velasco, an early skirmish in the Texas Revolution. In 1833, he became the alcalde of Brazoria Municipality. In 1835, he represented the Columbia Municipality at the Consultation in San Felipe de Austin, where he was chosen by the members to serve in the General Council of the Provisional Government of Texas.

On February 1, 1836, he was elected as the Brazoria delegate to the Convention of 1836 in Washington-on-the-Brazos, where he signed the newly adopted Texas Declaration of Independence on March 2. At the convention, he served on the committee that helped draft the Constitution of the Republic of Texas.

== 1839 Austin city plan ==
In 1839, he was chosen by Texas President Mirabeau Lamar to survey the site, sell lots, and erect public buildings for the new state capital in Austin. The original land site for the capital was narrowed to 640 acres (2.6 km^{2}) that fronted the Colorado River between two creeks, Shoal Creek and Waller Creek, which was later named in his honor. Waller and a team of surveyors developed Austin's first city plan, commonly known as the Waller Plan, dividing the site into a fourteen-block grid plan bisected by a broad north–south thoroughfare, Congress Avenue, running up from the river to Capital Square, where the new Texas State Capitol was to be constructed. A temporary one-story capitol was erected on the corner of Colorado and 8th streets. On August 1, the first auction of 306 lots was held. The grid plan that Waller designed and surveyed now forms the basis of the streets of downtown Austin.

== Other pursuits ==
On October 13, 1839, he offered his house for the meeting place to establish the first Masonic Lodge in Austin.

On January 13, 1840, he was elected the first mayor of Austin. He resigned before the end of his term, however, and moved to Austin County. A new county formed from parts of Austin County and neighboring Grimes County was renamed Waller County in his honor in 1873.

In 1861, Waller represented Austin County at the Texas secession convention. As one of the last living signers of the Texas Declaration of Independence, he was given the honor of signing the secession ordinance first after Convention President Oran Milo Roberts. The convention again regathered on March 4 to affirm its decision to leave the union and approve the "Constitution of the Confederate States of America"; although the Provisional Confederate Congress admitted Texas on March 1.

In 1873, Waller served as the first president of the Texas Veterans Association.

He died on January 3, 1881, in Austin, where he moved shortly before his death to live with one of his daughters. He was buried in Waller County, but his remains were later moved to the Texas State Cemetery in Austin.
