= Woolridge =

Hamlet in Gloucestershire, England

Coordinates: 51.90°N 02.29°W

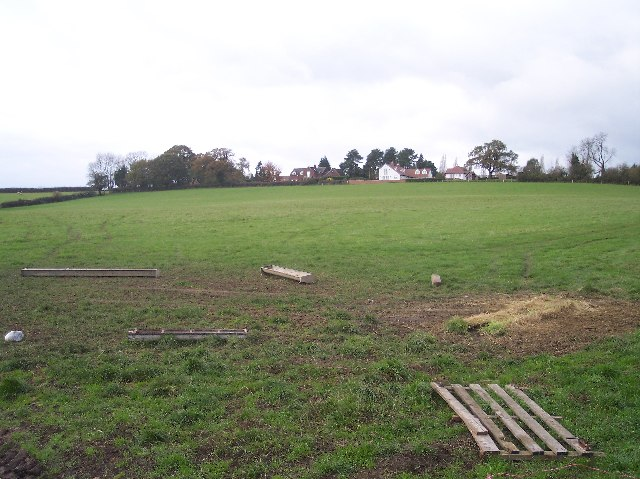
- View of Woolridge

- Location within Gloucestershire
- OS grid reference: SO8023
- Shire county: Gloucestershire
- Region: South West
- Country: England
- Sovereign state: United Kingdom
- Police: Gloucestershire
- Fire: Gloucestershire
- Ambulance: South Western

Woolridge is a hamlet in Gloucestershire, England.
