= 2022 United States House of Representatives elections in Texas =

- November 8, 2022

All 38 Texas seats to the United States House of Representatives
	Majority party	Minority party
Party	Republican	Democratic
Last election	23	13
Seats before	24	12
Seats won	25	13
Seat change	▲1	▲1
Popular vote	4,559,280	3,004,053
Percentage	58.78%	38.73%
Swing	▲5.35%	▼5.41%
Republican
40–50%
50–60%
60–70%
70–80%
80–90%
>90%
Democratic
50–60%
60–70%
70–80%
Democratic
Hold
Gain
Republican
Hold
Gain
Republican
40–50%
50–60%
60–70%
70–80%
80–90%
>90%
Democratic
50–60%
60–70%
70–80%

The 2022 United States House of Representatives elections in Texas were held on November 8, 2022, to elect the 38 U.S. representatives from Texas, one from each of the state's 38 congressional districts. The state gained two seats after the results of the 2020 census. The elections coincided with other elections to the House of Representatives, other elections to the United States Senate, and various state and local elections. Primary elections took place on March 1, with primary runoffs scheduled for May 24 for districts where no candidate received over 50% of the vote.

Republicans had gained one seat in the House due to a special election in the 34th district seeing Mayra Flores succeed Filemon Vela and become the first Mexican-born congresswoman. During the 2022 elections, the Democrats and Republicans each gained one of the two seats Texas gained through reapportionment. While Republicans flipped the 15th district, Democrats flipped back the 34th district, and retained the 28th district, dashing Republican hopes of a red wave in the Rio Grande Valley. This resulted in a net gain of one seat for both parties.

== Redistricting ==

The Texas Legislature drew new maps for Texas' congressional districts to account for the two new congressional districts it gained through the 2020 census. The Republican Party had a trifecta in the Texas Government at the time, giving them full control of the redistricting process. Legislators drew the maps for the state during a special session in Fall 2021. The maps that passed were widely criticized as racial and partisan gerrymanders designed to keep Republicans in power and reduce the voting power of minorities. News sources specifically noted that both of Texas' new congressional districts were majority white, despite voters of color making up 95% of the state's growth in the previous decade.

Unlike before the 2012 elections, Texas' maps did not have to pass preclearance under Section 5 of the Voting Rights Act of 1965, as the Supreme Court had ruled preclearance unconstitutional through Shelby County v. Holder in 2013. Despite this, the Justice Department sued the state of Texas after the map's passage, arguing that they violated Section 2 of the Voting Rights Act.

== Overview ==
=== Statewide ===
Party	Candidates	Votes		Seats		
Party	Candidates	No.	%	No.	+/–	%
Republican	38	4,559,280	58.78%	25	▲1	65.8%
Democratic	32	3,004,053	38.73%	13	▲1	34.2%
Libertarian	13	129,001	1.66%	0	Steady	0.0%
Independent	6	63,175	0.81%	0	Steady	0.0%
Write-in	5	1,252	0.02%	0	Steady	0.0%
Total	94	7,756,761	100%	38	▲2	100%

Popular vote
Republican	58.78%
Democratic	38.73%
Libertarian	1.66%
Independent	0.81%
Write-in	0.02%

House seats
Republican	65.8%
Democratic	34.2%

== District 1 ==
2022 Texas's 1st congressional district election
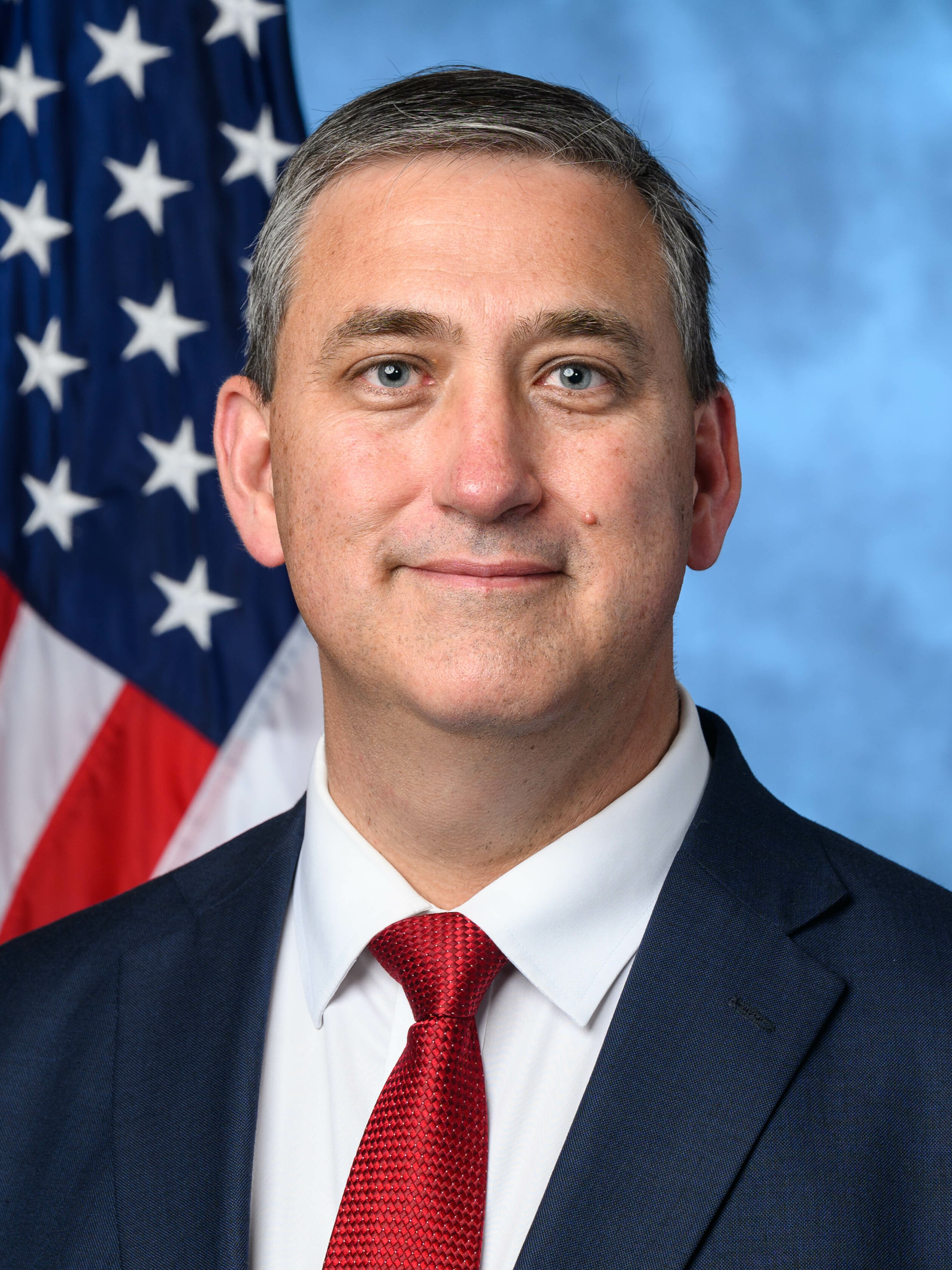

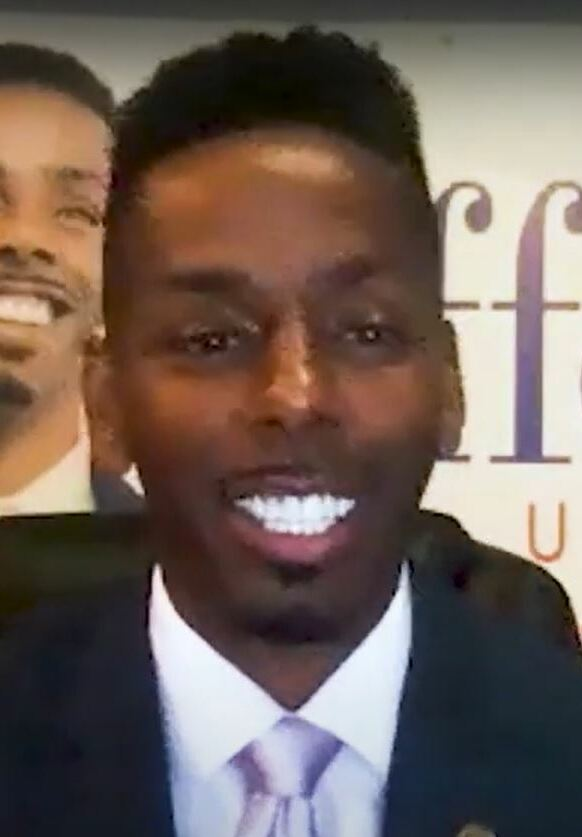
Nominee	Nathaniel Moran	Jrmar Jefferson
Party	Republican	Democratic
Popular vote	183,224	51,438
Percentage	78.08%	21.92%
- County results Moran: 70–80% 80–90% ≥90%
U.S. Representative before election
Louie Gohmert
Republican
Elected U.S. Representative
Nathaniel Moran
Republican

The 1st district encompasses Tyler, Longview, and Texarkana. The incumbent was Republican Louie Gohmert, who had represented the district since 2004 and was reelected with 72.6% of the vote in 2020. On November 22, 2021, Gohmert announced that he would run for Texas Attorney General against incumbent Ken Paxton.

=== Republican primary ===
==== Candidates ====
===== Nominee =====
- Nathaniel Moran, Smith County judge

===== Eliminated in primary =====
- Aditya Atholi, former oil rig worker
- Joe McDaniel II, businessman
- John Porro, physician

===== Declined =====
- Louie Gohmert, incumbent U.S. representative (ran for Texas attorney general)
- Matt Schaefer, Texas state representative

==== Endorsements ====
Aditya Atholi

Organizations

- Conservative Leadership PAC

Individuals

- Stuart Scheller, former United States Marine Corp lieutenant colonel and anti-Afghanistan withdrawal activist
- Kelli Ward, chairwoman of the Arizona Republican Party, former member of the Arizona Senate (2013–2015), candidate for the US Senate from Arizona in 2016 and in 2018

==== Primary results ====
Republican primary results
Party	Candidate	Votes	%
Republican	Nathaniel Moran	51,312	63.0
Republican	Joe McDaniel II	19,708	24.2
Republican	Aditya Atholi	6,186	7.6
Republican	John Porro	4,238	5.2
Total votes		81,444	100.0

=== Democratic primary ===
==== Candidates ====
===== Nominee =====
- Jrmar Jefferson, investor and perennial candidate

===== Eliminated in runoff =====
- Victor Dunn, businessman

===== Eliminated in primary =====
- Gavin Dass, teacher
- Stephen Kocen, self-employed

==== Endorsements ====
Jrmar Jefferson

Labor unions

- Texas AFL–CIO
- United Auto Workers

==== Primary results ====
Democratic primary results
Party	Candidate	Votes	%
Democratic	Jrmar Jefferson	7,411	45.5
Democratic	Victor Dunn	4,554	27.9
Democratic	Stephen Kocen	2,457	15.1
Democratic	Gavin Dass	1,881	11.5
Total votes		16,303	100.0

==== Primary runoff results ====
Democratic primary results
Party	Candidate	Votes	%
Democratic	Jrmar Jefferson	5,607	75.9
Democratic	Victor Dunn	1,783	24.1
Total votes		7,390	100.0

=== General election ===
==== Predictions ====
Source	Ranking	As of
The Cook Political Report	Solid R	October 25, 2021
Inside Elections	Solid R	November 15, 2021
Sabato's Crystal Ball	Safe R	November 11, 2021
Politico	Solid R	April 5, 2022
RCP	Safe R	June 9, 2022
Fox News	Solid R	July 11, 2022
DDHQ	Solid R	July 20, 2022
538	Solid R	June 30, 2022
The Economist	Safe R	September 28, 2022

==== Results ====
Texas's 1st congressional district, 2022
Party	Candidate	Votes	%
Republican	Nathaniel Moran	183,224	78.08
Democratic	Jrmar Jefferson	51,438	21.92
Total votes		234,662	100.0
Republican hold			

== District 2 ==
2022 Texas's 2nd congressional district election
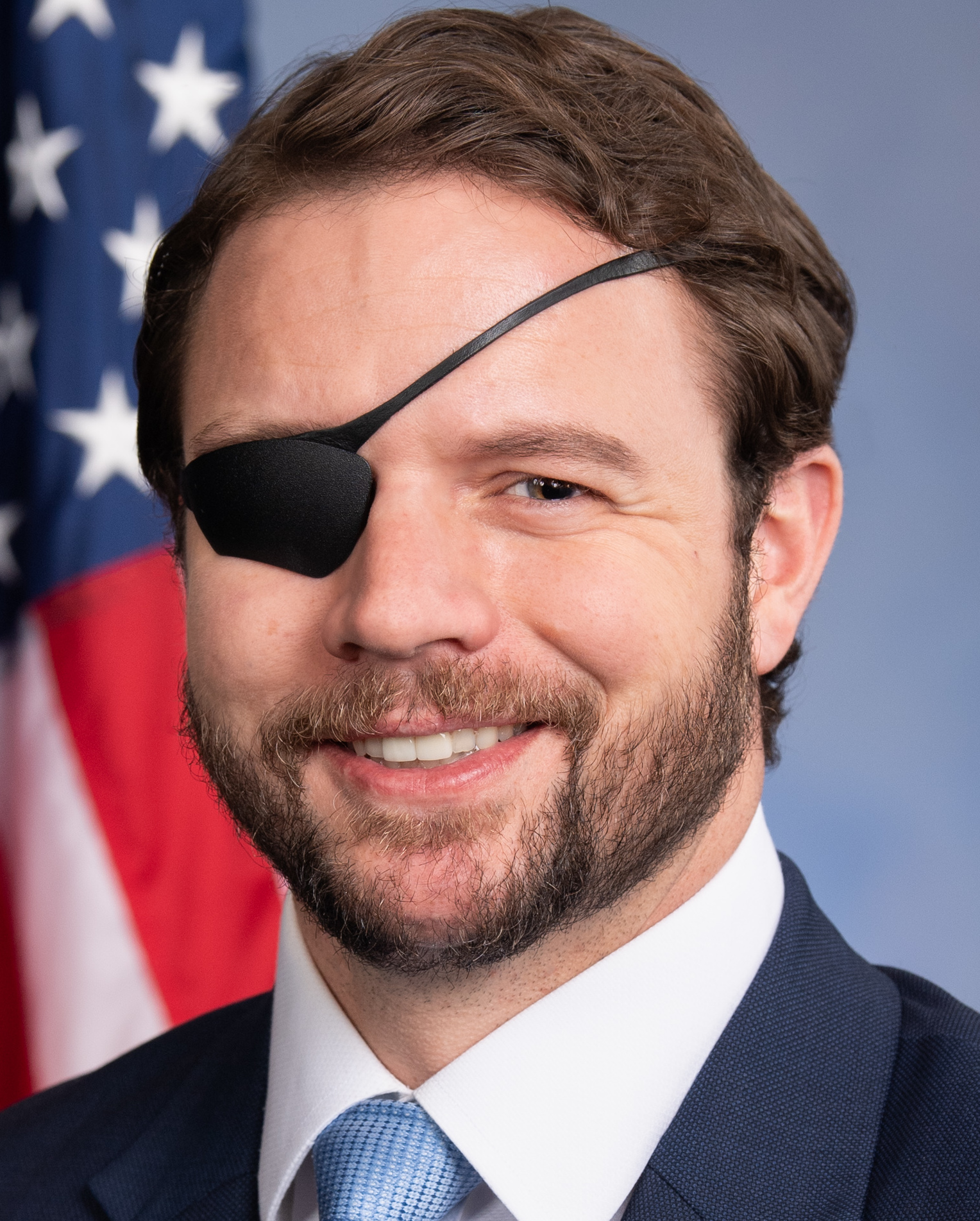

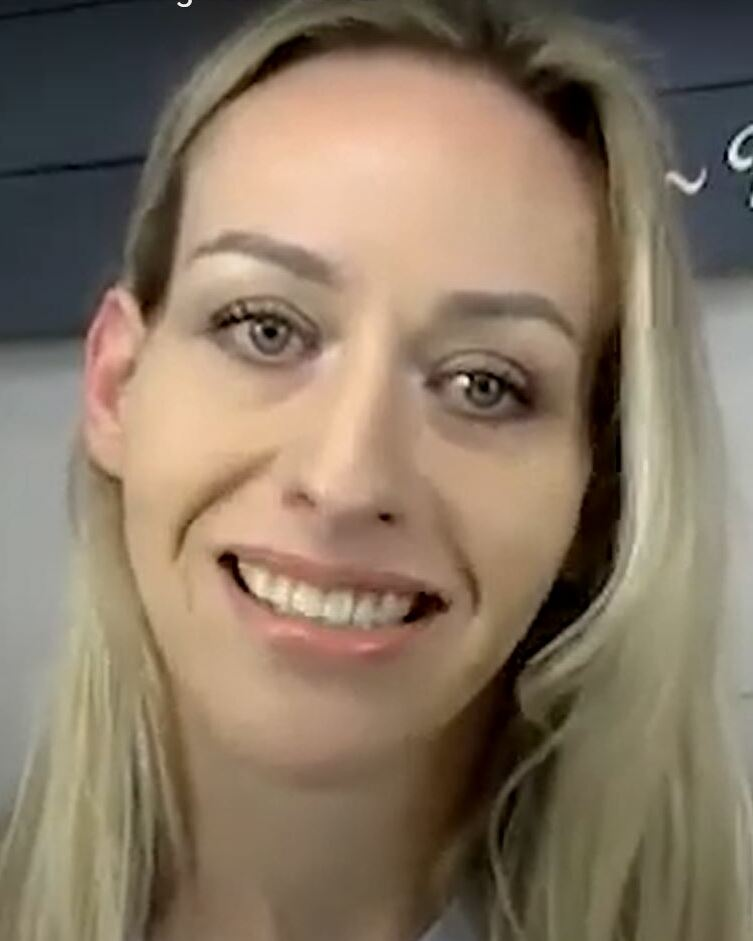
Nominee	Dan Crenshaw	Robin Fulford
Party	Republican	Democratic
Popular vote	151,791	78,496
Percentage	65.91%	34.09%
- Crenshaw: 50–60% 60–70% 70–80% 80–90% Fulford: 50–60% 60–70% 70–80% 80–90% Tie: 50%
U.S. Representative before election
Dan Crenshaw
Republican
Elected U.S. Representative
Dan Crenshaw
Republican

The 2nd district encompasses The Woodlands, Spring, Kingwood, Humble, and Atascocita. The incumbent was Republican Dan Crenshaw, who had represented the district since 2019 and was reelected with 55.6% of the vote in 2020.

=== Republican primary ===
Incumbent representative Dan Crenshaw, who had maintained a high profile since his election, faced three primary challengers. All three ran as more conservative alternatives to Crenshaw, criticizing him for his vote to certify the results of the 2020 presidential election.

==== Candidates ====
===== Nominee =====
- Dan Crenshaw, incumbent U.S. representative

===== Eliminated in primary =====
- Jameson Ellis, marketing executive
- Martin Etwop, Christian missionary
- Milam Langella, pilot

===== Withdrew =====
- Mike Billand
- Brett Guillory, educator (switched to Texas's 38th congressional district)
- Lucia Rodriguez

===== Declined =====
- Kevin Brady, U.S. representative

==== Endorsements ====
Dan Crenshaw

Organizations

- Citizens for Responsible Energy Solutions
- National Rifle Association-Political Victory Fund
- National Right to Life Committee
- Pro-Israel America

Newspapers and publications

- Houston Chronicle

==== Primary results ====
Republican primary results
Party	Candidate	Votes	%
Republican	Dan Crenshaw (incumbent)	45,863	74.5
Republican	Jameson Ellis	10,195	16.6
Republican	Martin Etwop	2,785	4.5
Republican	Milam Langella	2,741	4.5
Total votes		61,584	100.0

=== Democratic primary ===
==== Candidates ====
===== Nominee =====
- Robin Fulford, stay-at-home mother

===== Withdrawn =====
- Rayna Reid

==== Primary results ====
Democratic primary results
Party	Candidate	Votes	%
Democratic	Robin Fulford	17,160	100.0
Total votes		17,160	100.0

=== General election ===
==== Predictions ====
Source	Ranking	As of
The Cook Political Report	Solid R	October 25, 2021
Inside Elections	Solid R	November 15, 2021
Sabato's Crystal Ball	Safe R	November 11, 2021
Politico	Solid R	April 5, 2022
RCP	Safe R	June 9, 2022
Fox News	Solid R	July 11, 2022
DDHQ	Solid R	July 20, 2022
538	Solid R	June 30, 2022
The Economist	Safe R	September 28, 2022

==== Results ====
Texas's 2nd congressional district, 2022
Party	Candidate	Votes	%
Republican	Dan Crenshaw (incumbent)	151,791	65.91
Democratic	Robin Fulford	78,496	34.09
Total votes		230,287	100.0
Republican hold			

== District 3 ==
2022 Texas's 3rd congressional district election
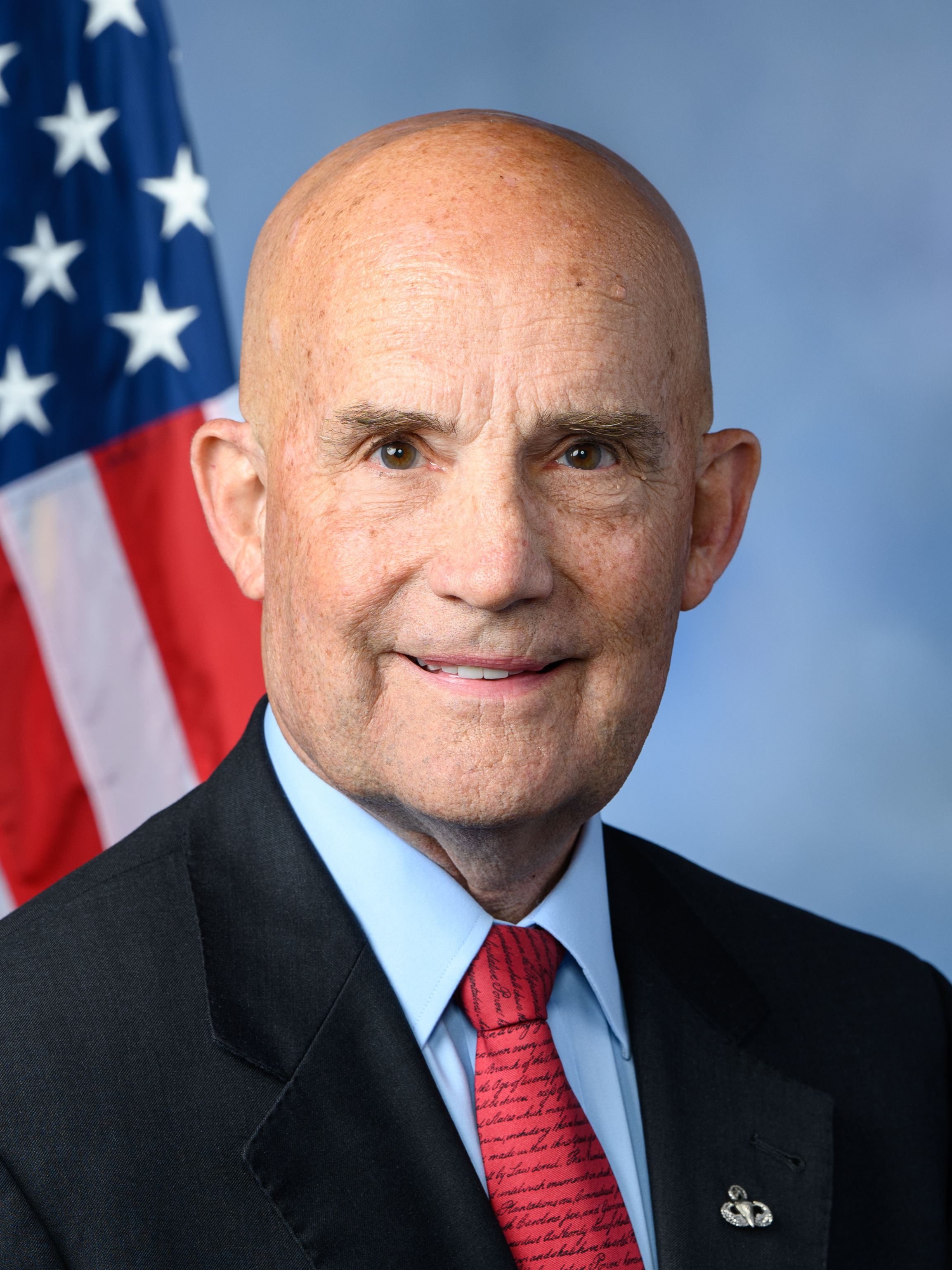

Nominee	Keith Self	Sandeep Srivastava
Party	Republican	Democratic
Popular vote	164,240	100,121
Percentage	60.55%	36.91%
- Self: 40–50% 50–60% 60–70% 70–80% 80–90% ≥90% Srivastava: 40–50% 50–60% 60–70% ≥90% Tie: 40–50%
U.S. Representative before election
Van Taylor
Republican
Elected U.S. Representative
Keith Self
Republican

The 3rd district encompasses much of Collin County and Hunt County. The incumbent was Republican Van Taylor, who had represented the district since 2019 and was reelected with 55.1% of the vote in 2020. On March 2, 2022, after being forced into a runoff, Taylor announced he would end his reelection campaign amid allegations of infidelity with a former jihadist. Former Collin County judge Keith Self became the Republican nominee following Taylor's withdrawal, canceling the runoff.

=== Republican primary ===
==== Candidates ====
===== Nominee =====
- Keith Self, former Collin County judge and candidate for Texas's 26th congressional district in 2002

===== Eliminated in primary =====
- Suzanne Harp, sales executive
- Jeremy Ivanovskis, flight attendant
- Rickey Williams, educator

===== Withdrawn =====
- Van Taylor, incumbent U.S. representative

==== Endorsements ====
Keith Self

Organizations

- Eagle Forum
Van Taylor

U.S. senators

- Ted Cruz, U.S. senator from Texas (2013–present)

Organizations

- National Rifle Association Political Victory Fund

==== Primary results ====
Republican primary results
Party	Candidate	Votes	%
Republican	Van Taylor (incumbent)	31,489	48.8
Republican	Keith Self	17,058	26.5
Republican	Suzanne Harp	13,375	20.8
Republican	Rickey Williams	1,731	2.7
Republican	Jeremy Ivanovskis	818	1.3
Total votes		64,471	100.0

==== Runoff results ====
The Republican primary runoff was canceled following Taylor's withdrawal. Self became the Republican nominee.

=== Democratic primary ===
==== Candidates ====
===== Nominee =====
- Sandeep Srivastava, real estate agent and candidate for Plano City Council in 2021

===== Eliminated in primary =====
- Doc Shelby, vice chairman of the Hunt County Democratic party (previously filed to run in Texas's 4th congressional district)

==== Endorsements ====
Sandeep Srivastava

Organizations

- Collin County Young Democrats

Labor unions

- United Auto Workers

==== Primary results ====
Democratic primary results
Party	Candidate	Votes	%
Democratic	Sandeep Srivastava	13,865	61.9
Democratic	Doc Shelby	8,531	38.1
Total votes		22,396	100.0

=== General election ===
==== Predictions ====
Source	Ranking	As of
The Cook Political Report	Solid R	October 25, 2021
Inside Elections	Solid R	November 15, 2021
Sabato's Crystal Ball	Safe R	November 11, 2021
Politico	Solid R	April 5, 2022
RCP	Safe R	June 9, 2022
Fox News	Solid R	July 11, 2022
DDHQ	Solid R	July 20, 2022
538	Solid R	June 30, 2022
The Economist	Safe R	September 28, 2022

==== Results ====
Texas's 3rd congressional district, 2022
Party	Candidate	Votes	%
Republican	Keith Self	164,240	60.55
Democratic	Sandeep Srivastava	100,121	36.91
Libertarian	Christopher Claytor	6,895	2.54
Total votes		271,256	100.0
Republican hold			

== District 4 ==
2022 Texas's 4th congressional district election
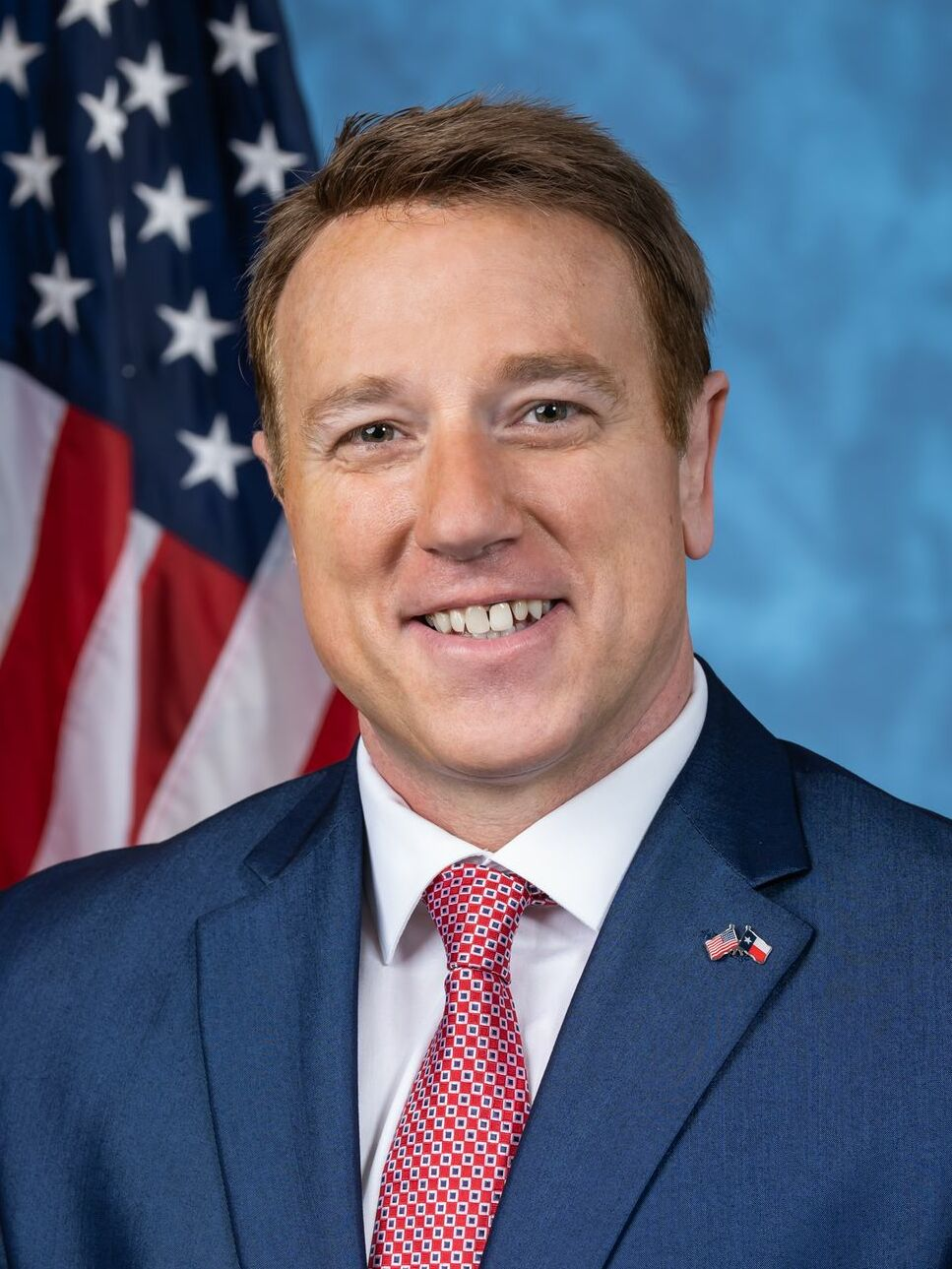

Nominee	Pat Fallon	Iro Omere
Party	Republican	Democratic
Popular vote	170,781	79,179
Percentage	66.71%	30.93%
- County results Fallon: 50–60% 70–80% 80–90%
U.S. Representative before election
Pat Fallon
Republican
Elected U.S. Representative
Pat Fallon
Republican

The 4th district encompasses counties along the Red River, as well as some sections of the suburban and exurban DFW Metroplex. The incumbent was Republican Pat Fallon, who had represented the district since 2021 and was elected with 75.1% of the vote in 2020.

=== Republican primary ===
==== Candidates ====
===== Nominee =====
- Pat Fallon, incumbent U.S. representative

===== Eliminated in primary =====
- John Harper, Air Force veteran, former vice president of Texas A&M University–Commerce, and former mayor of Rowlett
- Dan Thomas, news anchor

==== Endorsements ====
Pat Fallon

Executive branch officials

- Donald Trump, 45th president of the United States (2017–2021)

Organizations

- National Rifle Association Political Victory Fund

==== Primary results ====
Republican primary results
Party	Candidate	Votes	%
Republican	Pat Fallon (incumbent)	41,297	59.0
Republican	Dan Thomas	21,168	30.2
Republican	John Harper	7,576	10.8
Total votes		70,041	100.0

=== Democratic primary ===
==== Candidates ====
===== Nominee =====
- Iro Omere, consultant

===== Withdrew =====
- Earl Davis
- Doc Shelby, vice chairman of the Hunt County Democratic party (running in Texas's 3rd congressional district)

==== Primary results ====
Democratic primary results
Party	Candidate	Votes	%
Democratic	Iro Omere	16,404	100.0
Total votes		16,404	100.0

=== General election ===
==== Predictions ====
Source	Ranking	As of
The Cook Political Report	Solid R	October 25, 2021
Inside Elections	Solid R	November 15, 2021
Sabato's Crystal Ball	Safe R	November 11, 2021
Politico	Solid R	April 5, 2022
RCP	Safe R	June 9, 2022
Fox News	Solid R	July 11, 2022
DDHQ	Solid R	July 20, 2022
538	Solid R	June 30, 2022
The Economist	Safe R	September 28, 2022

==== Results ====
Texas's 4th congressional district, 2022
Party	Candidate	Votes	%
Republican	Pat Fallon (incumbent)	170,781	66.71
Democratic	Iro Omere	79,179	30.93
Libertarian	John Simmons	6,049	2.36
Total votes		256,009	100.0
Republican hold			

== District 5 ==
2022 Texas's 5th congressional district election
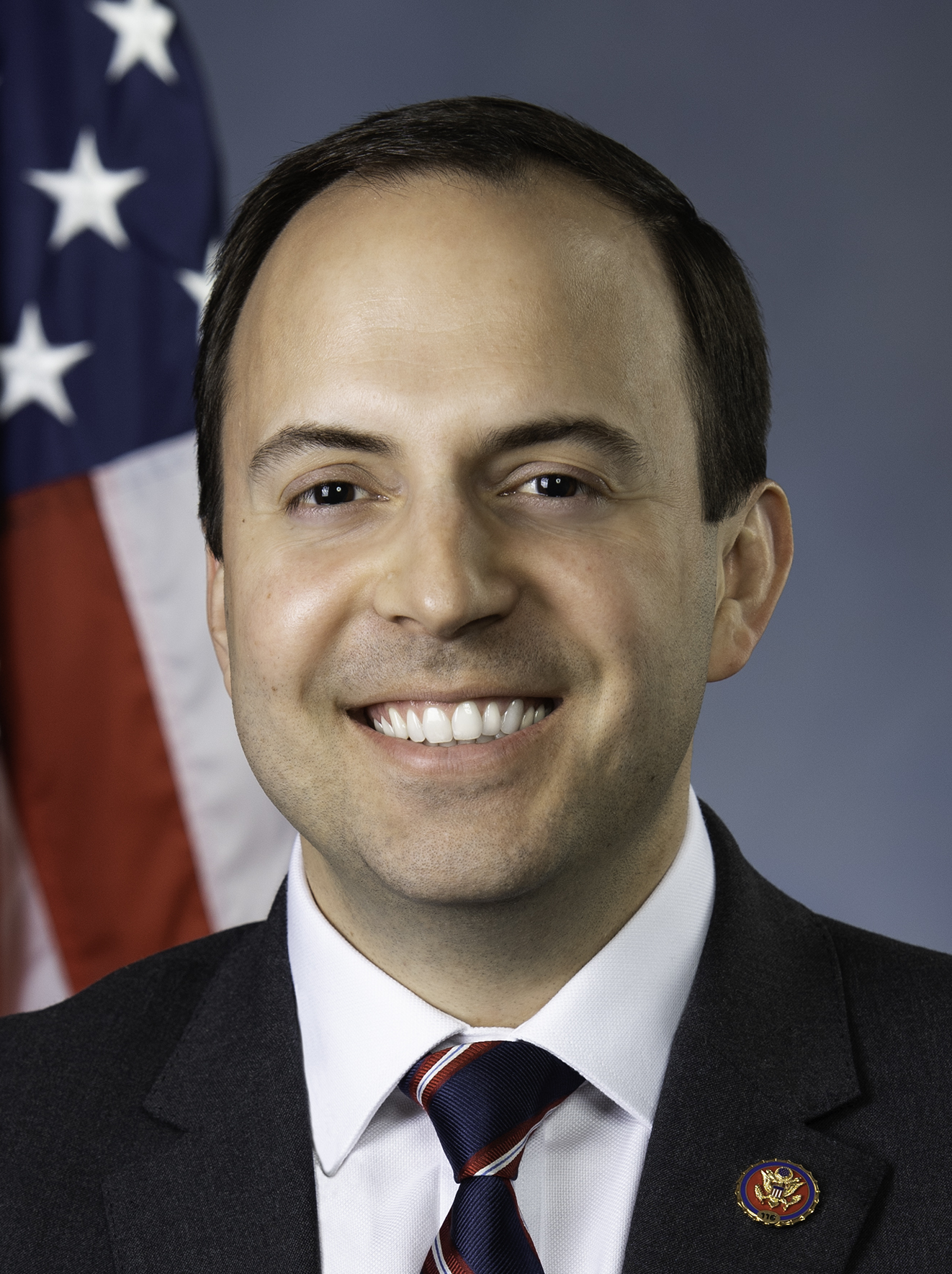

Nominee	Lance Gooden	Tartisha Hill
Party	Republican	Democratic
Popular vote	135,595	71,930
Percentage	63.97%	33.93%
- County results Gooden: 60–70% 80–90% Hill: 40–50%
U.S. Representative before election
Lance Gooden
Republican
Elected U.S. Representative
Lance Gooden
Republican

The 5th district encompasses Mesquite, Anderson, Cherokee, Henderson, Van Zandt, and Kaufman. The incumbent was Republican Lance Gooden, who had represented the district since 2019 and was reelected with 62% of the vote in 2020.

=== Republican primary ===
==== Candidates ====
===== Nominee =====
- Lance Gooden, incumbent U.S. representative

==== Endorsements ====
Lance Gooden

Executive branch officials

- Donald Trump, 45th president of the United States (2017–2021)

==== Primary results ====
Republican primary results
Party	Candidate	Votes	%
Republican	Lance Gooden (incumbent)	47,692	100.0
Total votes		47,692	100.0

=== Democratic primary ===
==== Candidates ====
===== Nominee =====
- Tartisha Hill, community health worker and former Balch Springs city councilor

===== Eliminated in primary =====
- Kathleen Bailey, former deputy assistant secretary for the Bureau of Intelligence and Research

===== Withdrew =====
- Charles Gearing, attorney (running for the Texas House of Representatives)

==== Primary results ====
Democratic primary results
Party	Candidate	Votes	%
Democratic	Tartisha Hill	10,689	52.7
Democratic	Kathleen Bailey	9,605	47.3
Total votes		20,294	100.0

=== General election ===
==== Predictions ====
Source	Ranking	As of
The Cook Political Report	Solid R	October 25, 2021
Inside Elections	Solid R	November 15, 2021
Sabato's Crystal Ball	Safe R	November 11, 2021
Politico	Solid R	April 5, 2022
RCP	Safe R	June 9, 2022
Fox News	Solid R	July 11, 2022
DDHQ	Solid R	July 20, 2022
538	Solid R	June 30, 2022
The Economist	Safe R	September 28, 2022

==== Results ====
Texas's 5th congressional district, 2022
Party	Candidate	Votes	%
Republican	Lance Gooden (incumbent)	135,595	63.97
Democratic	Tartisha Hill	71,930	33.93
Libertarian	Kevin Hale	4,293	2.03
Write-in	Ruth Torres	147	0.07
Total votes		211,965	100.0
Republican hold			

== District 6 ==
2022 Texas's 6th congressional district election
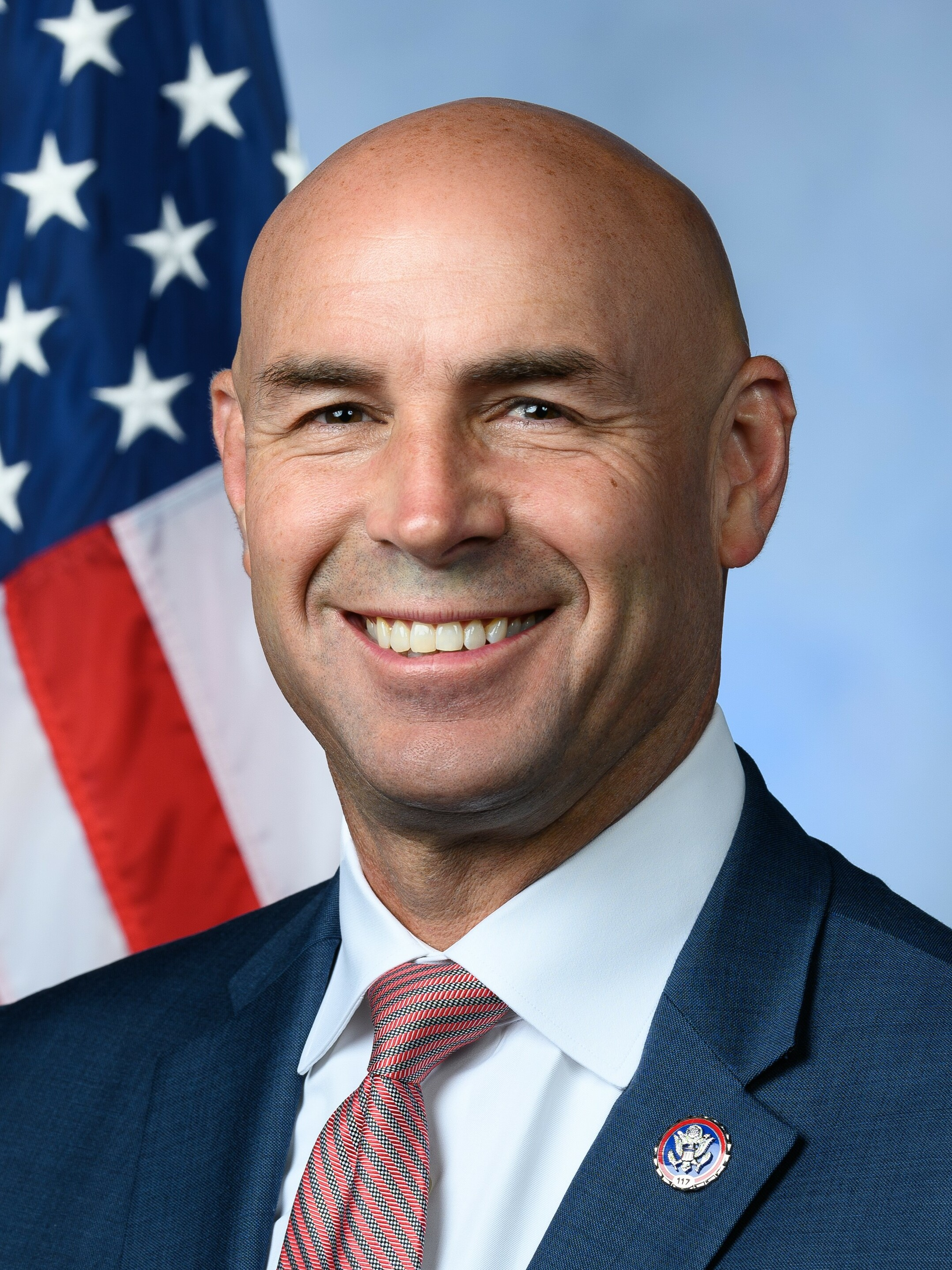
Nominee	Jake Ellzey
Party	Republican
Popular vote	149,321
Percentage	100.00%
- County results Ellzey: 100%
U.S. Representative before election
Jake Ellzey
Republican
Elected U.S. Representative
Jake Ellzey
Republican

The 6th district encompasses Ellis County and Palestine. The incumbent was Republican Jake Ellzey, who had represented the district since 2021 and was elected with 53.3% of the vote in 2021 after the previous incumbent, Ron Wright, died of complications from COVID-19 on February 7, 2021.

=== Republican primary ===
==== Candidates ====
===== Nominee =====
- Jake Ellzey, incumbent U.S. representative

===== Eliminated in primary =====
- James Buford, maintenance supervisor
- Bill Payne, retired attorney

==== Endorsements ====
Jake Ellzey

Executive branch officials

- Donald Trump, 45th president of the United States (2017–2021)

Organizations

- National Rifle Association-Political Victory Fund

==== Primary results ====
Republican primary results
Party	Candidate	Votes	%
Republican	Jake Ellzey (incumbent)	38,683	71.2
Republican	James Buford	8,636	15.9
Republican	Bill Payne	7,008	12.9
Total votes		54,327	100.0

=== General election ===
==== Predictions ====
Source	Ranking	As of
The Cook Political Report	Solid R	October 25, 2021
Inside Elections	Solid R	November 15, 2021
Sabato's Crystal Ball	Safe R	November 11, 2021
Politico	Solid R	April 5, 2022
RCP	Safe R	June 9, 2022
Fox News	Solid R	July 11, 2022
DDHQ	Solid R	July 20, 2022
538	Solid R	June 30, 2022
The Economist	Safe R	September 28, 2022

==== Results ====
Texas's 6th congressional district, 2022
Party	Candidate	Votes	%
Republican	Jake Ellzey (incumbent)	149,321	100.00
Total votes		149,321	100.0
Republican hold			

== District 7 ==
2022 Texas's 7th congressional district election
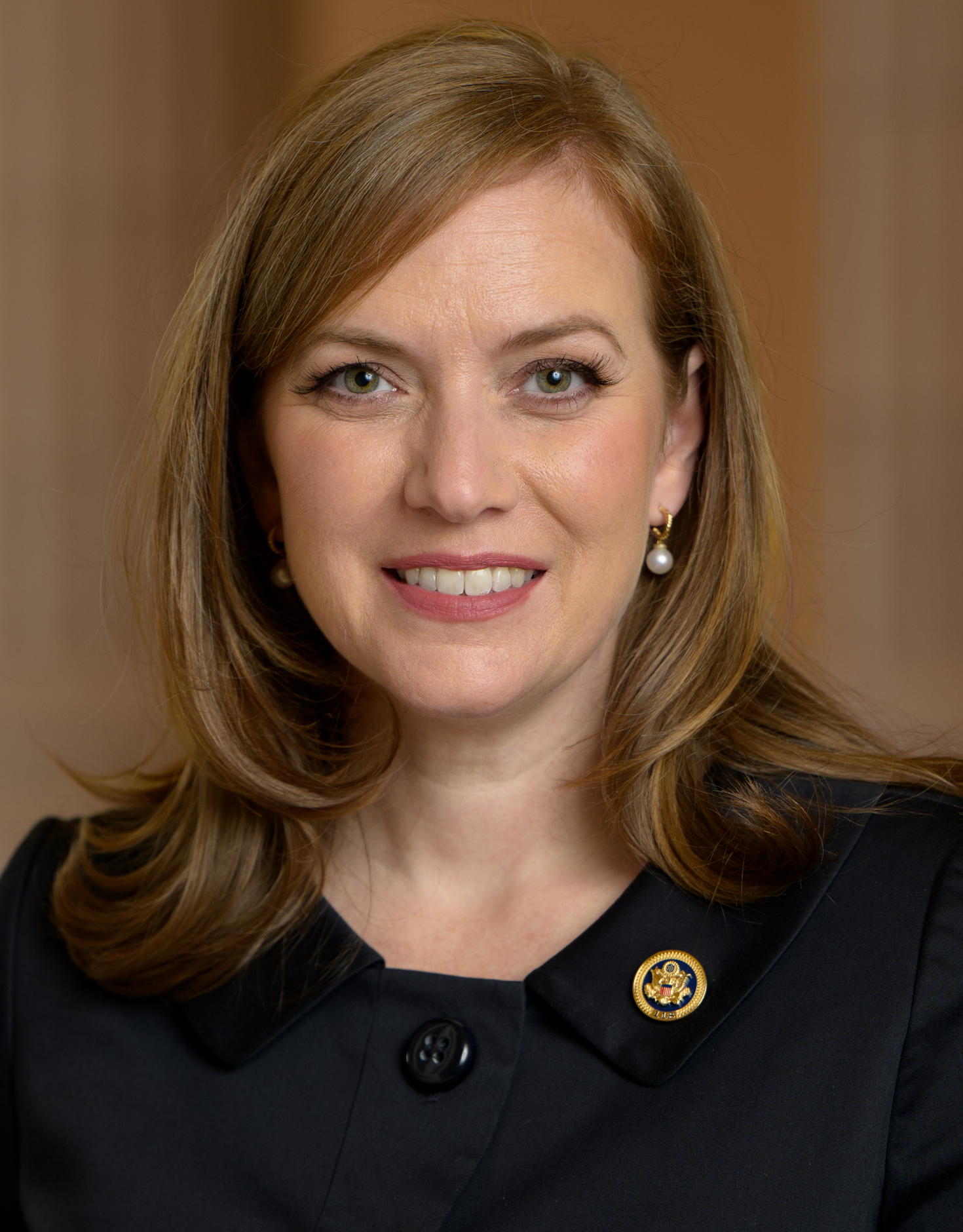

Nominee	Lizzie Fletcher	Johnny Teague
Party	Democratic	Republican
Popular vote	115,994	65,835
Percentage	63.79%	36.21%
- Fletcher: 50–60% 60–70% 70–80% 80–90% ≥90% Teague: 50–60% 60–70% ≥90% No votes
U.S. Representative before election
Lizzie Fletcher
Democratic
Elected U.S. Representative
Lizzie Fletcher
Democratic

The 7th district encompasses the suburbs of Houston such as Gulfton and Alief. The incumbent was Democrat Lizzie Fletcher, who had represented the district since 2019 and was reelected with 50.8% of the vote in 2020.

=== Democratic primary ===
==== Candidates ====
===== Nominee =====
- Lizzie Fletcher, incumbent U.S. representative

==== Endorsements ====
Lizzie Fletcher

Organizations

- EMILY's List
- Feminist Majority PAC
- Giffords
- National Women's Political Caucus
- Planned Parenthood Action Fund

Labor unions

- National Education Association
- Texas AFL–CIO
- United Auto Workers

==== Primary results ====
Democratic primary results
Party	Candidate	Votes	%
Democratic	Lizzie Fletcher (incumbent)	29,579	100.0
Total votes		29,579	100.0

=== Republican primary ===
==== Candidates ====
===== Nominee =====
- Johnny Teague, pastor, rancher and author of The Lost Diary of Anne Frank

===== Eliminated in runoff =====
- Tim Stroud, former combat medic

===== Eliminated in primary =====
- Rudy Atencio, mediator conflict specialist
- Tina Blum Cohen, actress and furniture company owner
- Benson Gitau, businessman
- Laique Rehman, entrepreneur
- Lance Stewart, franchisee

===== Withdrew =====
- Jafar Hajjar
- Roland Lopez, business consultant (running in Texas's 38th congressional district)
- Damien Mockus, gym owner (switched to run in Texas's 10th congressional district, now running in Texas's 38th congressional district)
- Richard Welch, project manager (running in Texas's 38th congressional district)

==== Endorsements ====
Johnny Teague

Federal officials

- Tom DeLay, former House majority leader and former US representative from Texas

==== Primary results ====
Republican primary results
Party	Candidate	Votes	%
Republican	Johnny Teague	9,293	43.0
Republican	Tim Stroud	6,346	29.4
Republican	Tina Blum Cohen	1,792	8.3
Republican	Lance Stewart	1,764	8.2
Republican	Rudy Atencio	1,024	4.7
Republican	Laique Rehman	977	4.5
Republican	Benson Gitau	422	2.0
Total votes		21,618	100.0

==== Primary runoff results ====
Republican primary runoff results
Party	Candidate	Votes	%
Republican	Johnny Teague	9,152	63.6
Republican	Tim Stroud	5,239	36.4
Total votes		14,391	100.0

=== General election ===
==== Predictions ====
Source	Ranking	As of
The Cook Political Report	Solid D	October 25, 2021
Inside Elections	Solid D	November 15, 2021
Sabato's Crystal Ball	Safe D	November 11, 2021
Politico	Solid D	April 5, 2022
RCP	Safe D	June 9, 2022
Fox News	Solid D	July 11, 2022
DDHQ	Solid D	July 20, 2022
538	Solid D	June 30, 2022
The Economist	Safe D	September 28, 2022

==== Results ====
Texas's 7th congressional district, 2022
Party	Candidate	Votes	%
Democratic	Lizzie Fletcher (incumbent)	115,994	63.79
Republican	Johnny Teague	65,835	36.21
Total votes		181,829	100.0
Democratic hold			

== District 8 ==
2022 Texas's 8th congressional district election
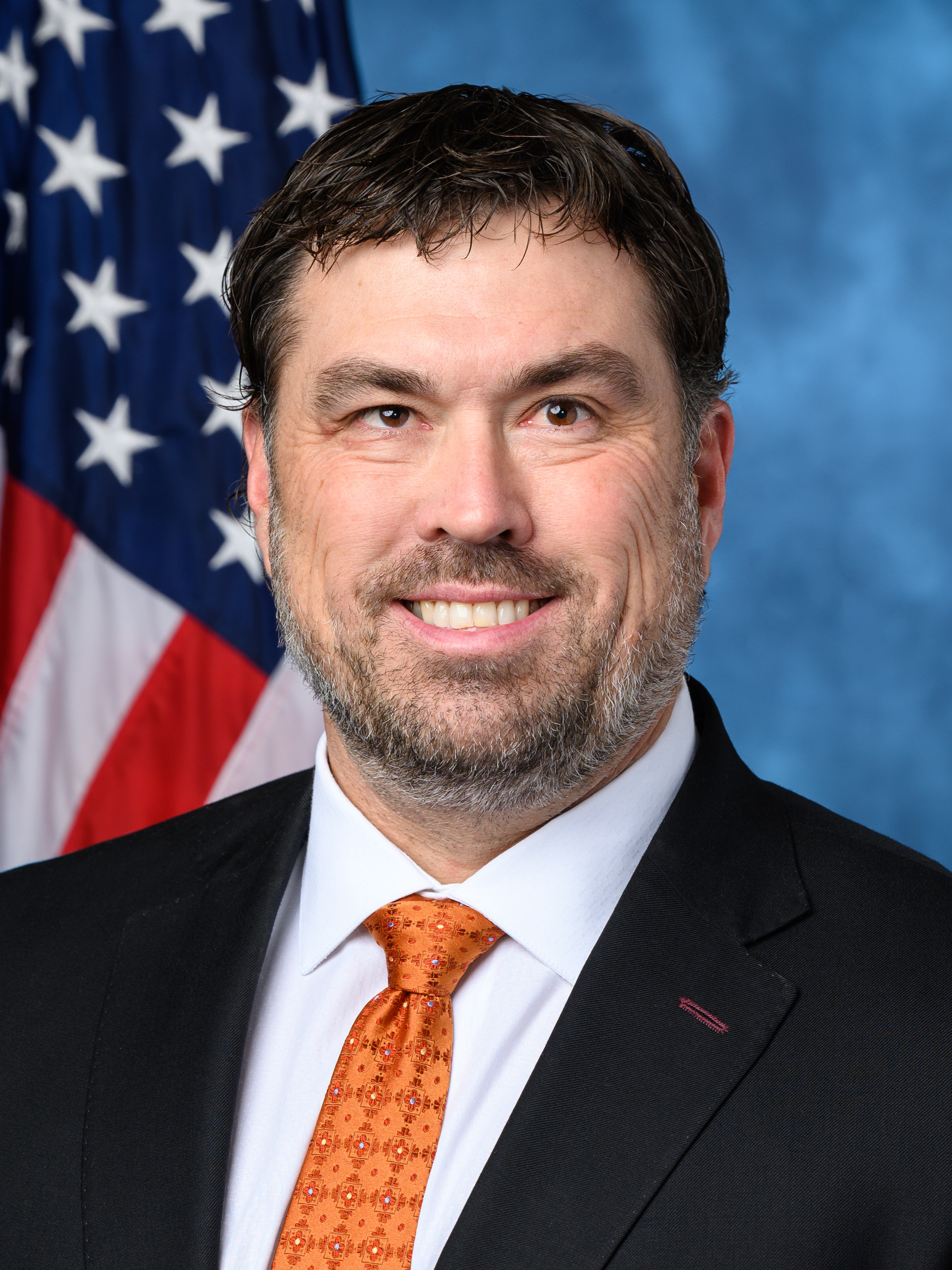

Nominee	Morgan Luttrell	Laura Jones
Party	Republican	Democratic
Popular vote	153,127	68,715
Percentage	68.07%	30.54%
- County results Luttrell: 80–90% Jones: 50–60%
U.S. Representative before election
Kevin Brady
Republican
Elected U.S. Representative
Morgan Luttrell
Republican

The 8th district includes northern suburbs and exurbs of Houston such as Conroe and Willis. It was represented by Republican Kevin Brady, who retired, leaving the 8th as an open seat during the 2022 election.

=== Republican primary ===
==== Candidates ====
===== Nominee =====
- Morgan Luttrell, businessman, retired Navy Seal, and brother of former Navy Seal Marcus Luttrell

===== Eliminated in primary =====
- Betsy Bates, surgical tech
- Candice Burrows, businesswoman
- Christian Collins, former aide to Ted Cruz
- Jonathan Hullihan, Navy JAG veteran and attorney
- Dan McKaughan, pastor and U.S. Navy veteran
- Jonathan Mitchell, pipeliner
- Chuck Montgomery, comedian
- Michael Philips, telecom executive
- Jessica Wellington, former congressional aide
- Taylor Whichard, Willis public works director

===== Withdrew =====
- Rudy Atencio (running in Texas's 7th congressional district)
- Martin Etwop, Christian missionary (running in Texas's 2nd congressional district)
- Jerry Ford Sr., fire chief and business owner (running in Texas's 38th congressional district)
- Salvador Gallegos
- Ryan Jarchow (endorsed Hullihan)
- Adrian Kaiser
- Christopher Revis

===== Declined =====
- Kevin Brady, incumbent U.S. representative

==== Endorsements ====
Christian Collins

U.S. senators

- Ted Cruz, U.S. senator from Texas (2013–present), solicitor general of Texas (2003–2008)

U.S. representatives

- Madison Cawthorn, U.S. representative for NC-11 (2021–present)
- Lance Gooden, U.S. representative for TX-05 (2019–present)
- Marjorie Taylor Greene, U.S. representative for GA-14 (2021–present)
- Troy Nehls, U.S. representative for TX-22 (2021–present)

State and local officials

- Wendy Rogers, state senator for Arizona's 6th legislative district (2021–present)

Individuals

- Mike Lindell, businessman and conservative political activist

PACs

- FreedomWorks
- House Freedom Fund
Morgan Luttrell

Executive branch officials

- Nikki Haley, United States Ambassador to the United Nations (2017–2019), Governor of South Carolina (2011–2017)
- Rick Perry, United States Secretary of Energy (2017–2019), governor of Texas (2000–2015), lieutenant governor of Texas (1999–2000), agriculture commissioner of Texas (1991–1999), Texas state representative (1985–1991)

U.S. governors

- Dan Patrick, lieutenant governor of Texas (2015–present), Texas state senator (2007–2015)

U.S. representatives

- Dan Crenshaw, U.S. representative for TX-02 (2019–present)
- Jake Ellzey, U.S. representative for TX-06 (2021–present)
- Tony Gonzales, U.S. representative for TX-23 (2021–present)
- Wesley Hunt, U.S. representative for TX-38 (2023–present)
- Ronny Jackson, U.S. representative for TX-13 (2021–present)
- Adam Kinzinger, U.S. representative for IL-16 (2011–2023)

PACs

- Congressional Leadership Fund
- Republican Main Street Partnership
Jessica Wellington

Newspapers

- Houston Chronicle

==== Primary results ====
Republican primary results
Party	Candidate	Votes	%
Republican	Morgan Luttrell	34,271	52.2
Republican	Christian Collins	14,659	22.3
Republican	Jonathan Hullihan	8,296	12.6
Republican	Dan McKaughan	1,585	2.4
Republican	Jessica Wellington	1,550	2.4
Republican	Candice Burrows	1,519	2.3
Republican	Chuck Montgomery	1,169	1.8
Republican	Michael Philips	871	1.3
Republican	Jonathan Mitchell	791	1.2
Republican	Betsy Bates	712	1.1
Republican	Taylor Whichard	295	0.5
Total votes		65,718	100.0

=== Democratic primary ===
==== Candidates ====
===== Nominee =====
- Laura Jones, chair of the San Jacinto County Democratic Party

==== Primary results ====
Democratic primary results
Party	Candidate	Votes	%
Democratic	Laura Jones	14,496	100.0
Total votes		14,496	100.0

=== General election ===
==== Predictions ====
Source	Ranking	As of
The Cook Political Report	Solid R	October 25, 2021
Inside Elections	Solid R	November 15, 2021
Sabato's Crystal Ball	Safe R	November 11, 2021
Politico	Solid R	April 5, 2022
RCP	Safe R	June 9, 2022
Fox News	Solid R	July 11, 2022
DDHQ	Solid R	July 20, 2022
538	Solid R	June 30, 2022
The Economist	Safe R	September 28, 2022

==== Results ====
Texas's 8th congressional district, 2022
Party	Candidate	Votes	%
Republican	Morgan Luttrell	153,127	68.07
Democratic	Laura Jones	68,715	30.54
Libertarian	Roy Eriksen	3,126	1.39
Total votes		224,968	100.0

== District 9 ==
2022 Texas's 9th congressional district election
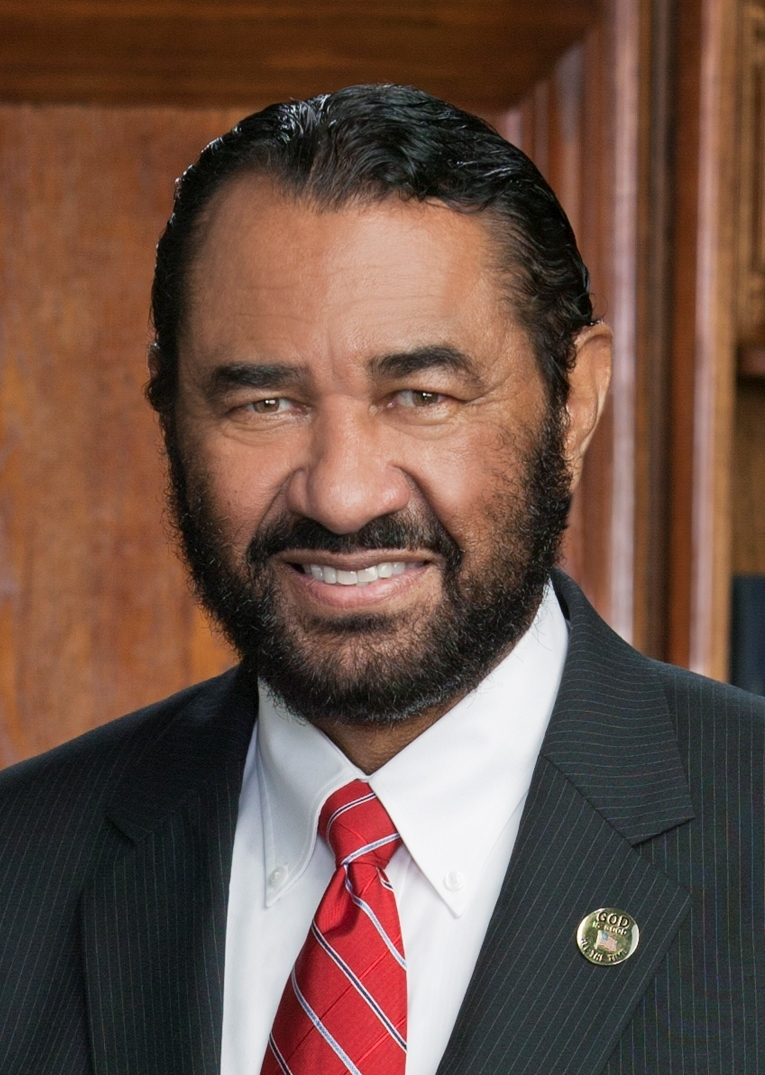

Nominee	Al Green	Jimmy Leon
Party	Democratic	Republican
Popular vote	125,446	38,161
Percentage	76.68%	23.32%
- Green: 50–60% 60–70% 70–80% 80–90% ≥90% Leon: 50–60% 70–80%
U.S. Representative before election
Al Green
Democratic
Elected U.S. Representative
Al Green
Democratic

The 9th district encompasses the southern Houston suburbs such as Missouri City. The incumbent was Democrat Al Green, who was reelected with 75.5% of the vote in 2020.

=== Democratic primary ===
==== Candidates ====
===== Nominee =====
- Al Green, incumbent U.S. representative

==== Endorsements ====
Al Green

Labor unions

- Texas AFL–CIO
- United Auto Workers

Organizations

- Sierra Club

==== Results ====
Democratic primary results
Party	Candidate	Votes	%
Democratic	Al Green (incumbent)	42,782	100.0
Total votes		42,782	100.0

=== Republican primary ===
==== Candidates ====
===== Nominee =====
- Jimmy Leon, educator

==== Results ====
Republican primary results
Party	Candidate	Votes	%
Republican	Jimmy Leon	10,503	100.0
Total votes		10,503	100.0

=== General election ===
==== Predictions ====
Source	Ranking	As of
The Cook Political Report	Solid D	October 25, 2021
Inside Elections	Solid D	November 15, 2021
Sabato's Crystal Ball	Safe D	November 11, 2021
Politico	Solid D	April 5, 2022
RCP	Safe D	June 9, 2022
Fox News	Solid D	July 11, 2022
DDHQ	Solid D	July 20, 2022
538	Solid D	June 30, 2022
The Economist	Safe D	September 28, 2022

==== Results ====
Texas's 9th congressional district, 2022
Party	Candidate	Votes	%
Democratic	Al Green (incumbent)	125,446	76.68
Republican	Jimmy Leon	38,161	23.32
Total votes		163,607	100.0

== District 10 ==
2022 Texas's 10th congressional district election
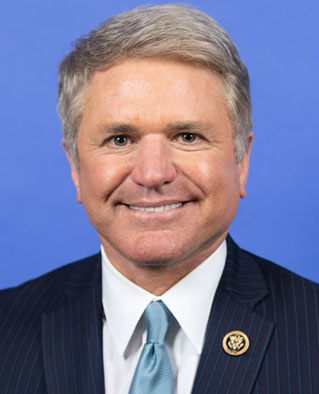

Nominee	Michael McCaul	Linda Nuno
Party	Republican	Democratic
Popular vote	159,469	86,404
Percentage	63.30%	34.30%
- County results McCaul: 50–60% 60–70% 80–90% Nuno: 50–60%
U.S. Representative before election
Michael McCaul
Republican
Elected U.S. Representative
Michael McCaul
Republican

The 10th district stretches from northwestern Austin to Bryan–College Station. The incumbent was Republican Michael McCaul, who was reelected in 2020 with 52.6% of the vote.

=== Republican primary ===
==== Candidates ====
===== Nominee =====
- Michael McCaul, incumbent U.S. representative

===== Withdrew =====
- Damien Mockus, gym owner (previously filed to run in Texas's 7th congressional district, now running in Texas's 38th congressional district)

==== Endorsements ====
Michael McCaul

Executive branch officials

- Donald Trump, 45th president of the United States (2017–2021)

Organizations

- Pro-Israel America

==== Results ====
Republican primary results
Party	Candidate	Votes	%
Republican	Michael McCaul (incumbent)	63,920	100.0
Total votes		63,920	100.0

=== Democratic primary ===
==== Candidates ====
===== Nominee =====
- Linda Nuno, healthcare worker

===== Withdrew =====
- Larry Wallace Jr., mayor of Manor

==== Endorsements ====
Linda Nuno

Labor unions

- Texas AFL–CIO
- United Auto Workers

==== Results ====
Democratic primary results
Party	Candidate	Votes	%
Democratic	Linda Nuno	20,537	100.0
Total votes		20,537	100.0

=== General election ===
==== Predictions ====
Source	Ranking	As of
The Cook Political Report	Solid R	October 25, 2021
Inside Elections	Solid R	November 15, 2021
Sabato's Crystal Ball	Safe R	November 11, 2021
Politico	Solid R	April 5, 2022
RCP	Safe R	June 9, 2022
Fox News	Solid R	July 11, 2022
DDHQ	Solid R	July 20, 2022
538	Solid R	June 30, 2022
The Economist	Safe R	September 28, 2022

==== Results ====
Texas's 10th congressional district, 2022
Party	Candidate	Votes	%
Republican	Michael McCaul (incumbent)	159,469	63.30
Democratic	Linda Nuno	86,404	34.30
Libertarian	Bill Kelsey	6,064	2.41
Total votes		251,937	100.0

== District 11 ==
2022 Texas's 11th congressional district election
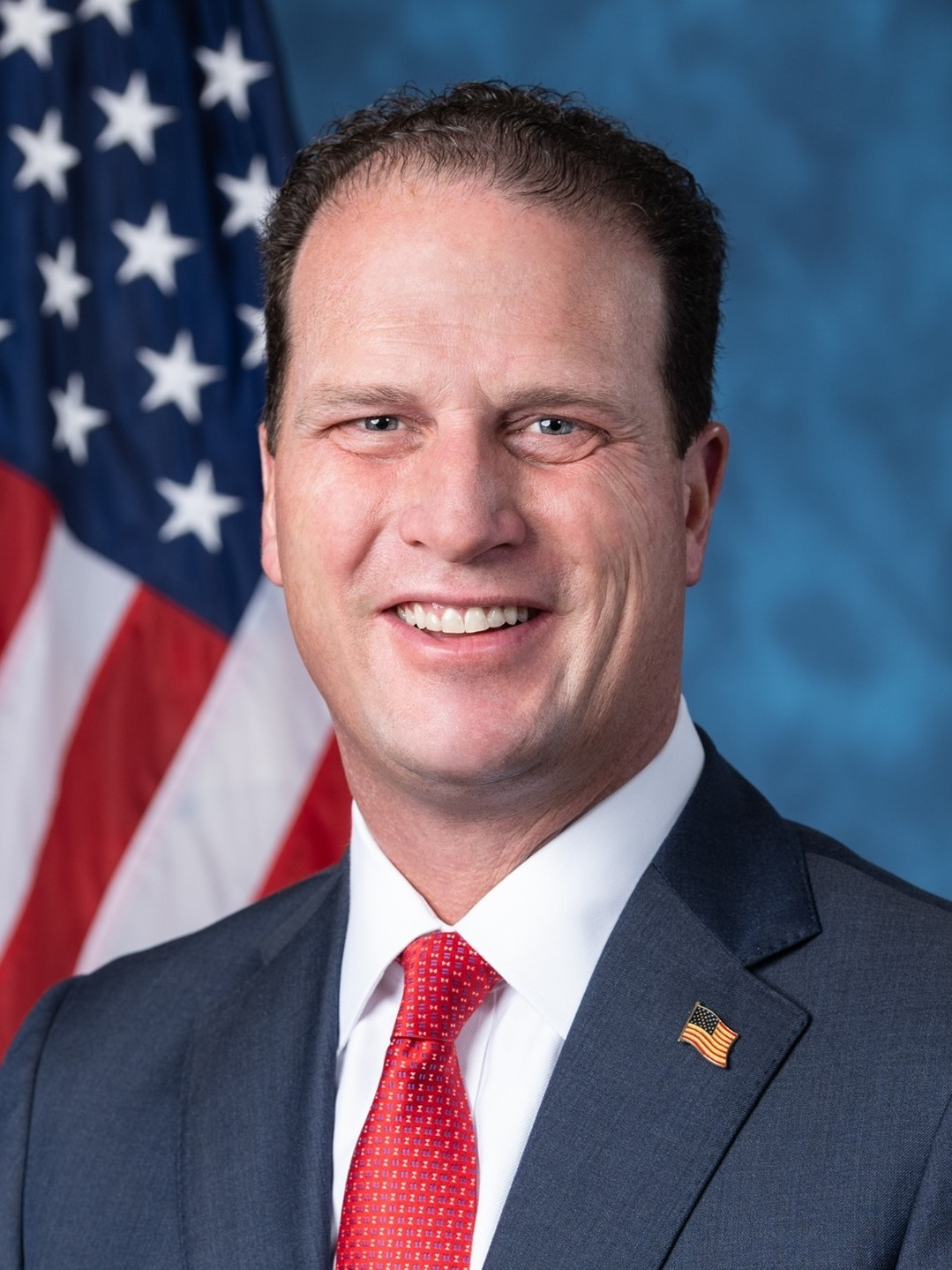
Nominee	August Pfluger
Party	Republican
Popular vote	151,066
Percentage	100.00%
- County results Pfluger: 100%
U.S. Representative before election
August Pfluger
Republican
Elected U.S. Representative
August Pfluger
Republican

The 11th district is based in midwestern Texas, including Lamesa, Midland, Odessa, San Angelo, Granbury, and Brownwood. The incumbent was Republican August Pfluger, who was elected with 79.7% of the vote in 2020.

=== Republican primary ===
==== Candidates ====
===== Nominee =====
- August Pfluger, incumbent U.S. representative

==== Endorsements ====
August Pfluger

Executive branch officials

- Donald Trump, 45th president of the United States (2017–2021)

==== Results ====
Republican primary results
Party	Candidate	Votes	%
Republican	August Pfluger (incumbent)	61,479	100.0
Total votes		61,479	100.0

=== General election ===
==== Predictions ====
Source	Ranking	As of
The Cook Political Report	Solid R	October 25, 2021
Inside Elections	Solid R	November 15, 2021
Sabato's Crystal Ball	Safe R	November 11, 2021
Politico	Solid R	April 5, 2022
RCP	Safe R	June 9, 2022
Fox News	Solid R	July 11, 2022
DDHQ	Solid R	July 20, 2022
538	Solid R	June 30, 2022
The Economist	Safe R	September 28, 2022

==== Results ====
Texas's 11th congressional district, 2022
Party	Candidate	Votes	%
Republican	August Pfluger (incumbent)	151,066	100.00
Total votes		151,066	100.0

== District 12 ==
2022 Texas's 12th congressional district election
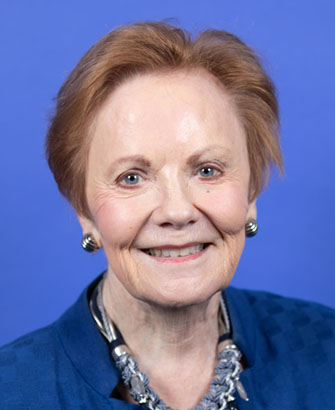

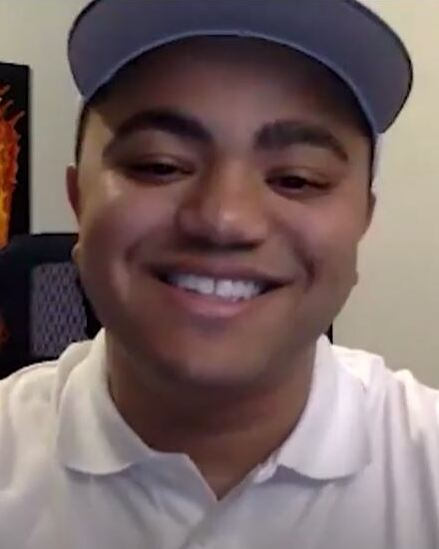
Nominee	Kay Granger	Trey Hunt
Party	Republican	Democratic
Popular vote	152,943	85,026
Percentage	64.27%	35.73%
- Granger: 50–60% 60–70% 70–80% 80–90% ≥90% Hunt: 50–60% 60–70% 70–80% 80–90% ≥90% Tie: 50% No votes
U.S. Representative before election
Kay Granger
Republican
Elected U.S. Representative
Kay Granger
Republican

The 12th district is in the Dallas–Fort Worth metroplex, and takes in Parker County and western Tarrant County, including parts of Fort Worth and its inner suburbs of North Richland Hills, Saginaw, and Haltom City. The incumbent was Republican Kay Granger, who was reelected with 63.7% of the vote in 2020.

=== Republican primary ===
==== Candidates ====
===== Nominee =====
- Kay Granger, incumbent U.S. representative

===== Eliminated in primary =====
- Ryan Catala, public school administrator
- Alysia Rieg, EMT

===== Withdrew =====
- Chris Putnam, former Colleyville city councilor and candidate for this district in 2020
- Chris Rector (running for the Texas House of Representatives as a Democrat)

==== Endorsements ====
Kay Granger

Executive branch officials

- Donald Trump, 45th president of the United States (2017–2021)

Organizations

- Maggie's List
- National Rifle Association-Political Victory Fund

==== Results ====
Republican primary results
Party	Candidate	Votes	%
Republican	Kay Granger (incumbent)	46,779	75.2
Republican	Ryan Catala	8,759	14.1
Republican	Alysia Rieg	6,662	10.7
Total votes		62,200	100.0

=== Democratic primary ===
==== Candidates ====
===== Nominee =====
- Trey Hunt, social worker

==== Endorsements ====
Trey Hunt

Labor unions

- Texas AFL–CIO
- United Auto Workers

==== Results ====
Democratic primary results
Party	Candidate	Votes	%
Democratic	Trey Hunt	20,561	100.0
Total votes		20,561	100.0

=== General election ===
==== Predictions ====
Source	Ranking	As of
The Cook Political Report	Solid R	October 25, 2021
Inside Elections	Solid R	November 15, 2021
Sabato's Crystal Ball	Safe R	November 11, 2021
Politico	Solid R	April 5, 2022
RCP	Safe R	June 9, 2022
Fox News	Solid R	July 11, 2022
DDHQ	Solid R	July 20, 2022
538	Solid R	June 30, 2022
The Economist	Safe R	September 28, 2022

==== Results ====
Texas's 12th congressional district, 2022
Party	Candidate	Votes	%
Republican	Kay Granger (incumbent)	152,953	64.27
Democratic	Trey Hunt	85,026	35.73
Total votes		237,979	100.0

== District 13 ==
2022 Texas's 13th congressional district election
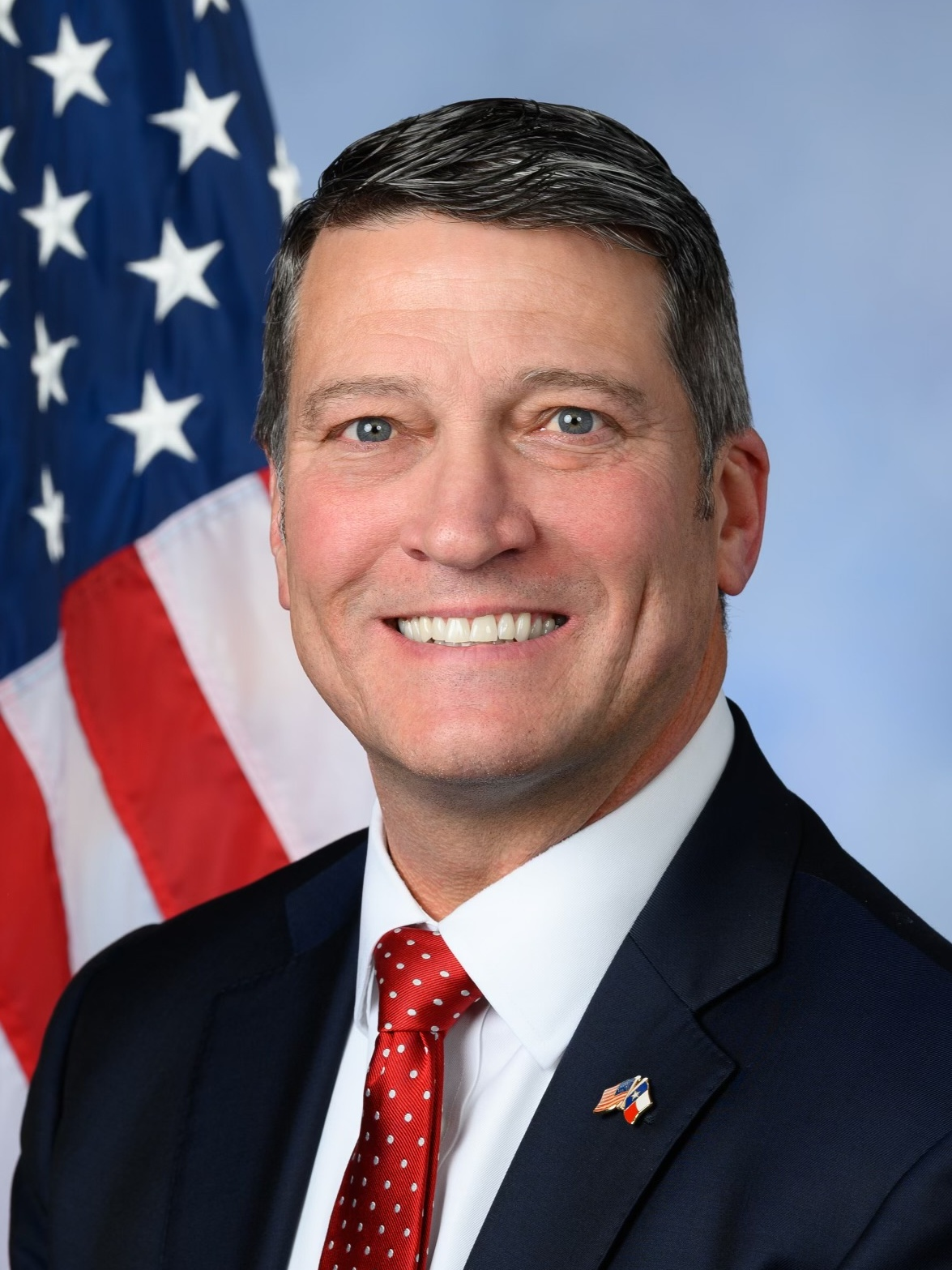

Nominee	Ronny Jackson	Kathleen Brown
Party	Republican	Democratic
Popular vote	161,767	52,910
Percentage	75.35%	24.65%
- County results Jackson: 70–80% 80–90% ≥90% Brown: 50–60%
U.S. Representative before election
Ronny Jackson
Republican
Elected U.S. Representative
Ronny Jackson
Republican

The 13th district encompasses most of the Texas Panhandle, containing the cities of Amarillo, Gainesville and Wichita Falls, as well as northern Denton County. The incumbent was Republican Ronny Jackson, who was elected with 79.4% of the vote in 2020.

=== Republican primary ===
==== Candidates ====
===== Nominee =====
- Ronny Jackson, incumbent U.S. representative

==== Endorsements ====
Ronny Jackson

Executive branch officials

- Donald Trump, 45th president of the United States (2017–2021)

==== Results ====
Republican primary results
Party	Candidate	Votes	%
Republican	Ronny Jackson (incumbent)	71,554	100.0
Total votes		71,554	100.0

=== Democratic primary ===
==== Candidates ====
===== Nominee =====
- Kathleen Brown, attorney

===== Declined =====
- Gus Trujillo, office manager and nominee for Texas's 13th congressional district in 2020

==== Endorsements ====
Kathleen Brown

Labor unions

- Texas AFL–CIO
- United Auto Workers

==== Results ====
Democratic primary results
Party	Candidate	Votes	%
Democratic	Kathleen Brown	10,807	100.0
Total votes		10,807	100.0

=== General election ===
==== Predictions ====
Source	Ranking	As of
The Cook Political Report	Solid R	October 25, 2021
Inside Elections	Solid R	November 15, 2021
Sabato's Crystal Ball	Safe R	November 11, 2021
Politico	Solid R	April 5, 2022
RCP	Safe R	June 9, 2022
Fox News	Solid R	July 11, 2022
DDHQ	Solid R	July 20, 2022
538	Solid R	June 30, 2022
The Economist	Safe R	September 28, 2022

==== Results ====
Texas's 13th congressional district, 2022
Party	Candidate	Votes	%
Republican	Ronny Jackson (incumbent)	161,767	75.35
Democratic	Kathleen Brown	52,910	24.65
Total votes		214,677	100.0

== District 14 ==
2022 Texas's 14th congressional district election
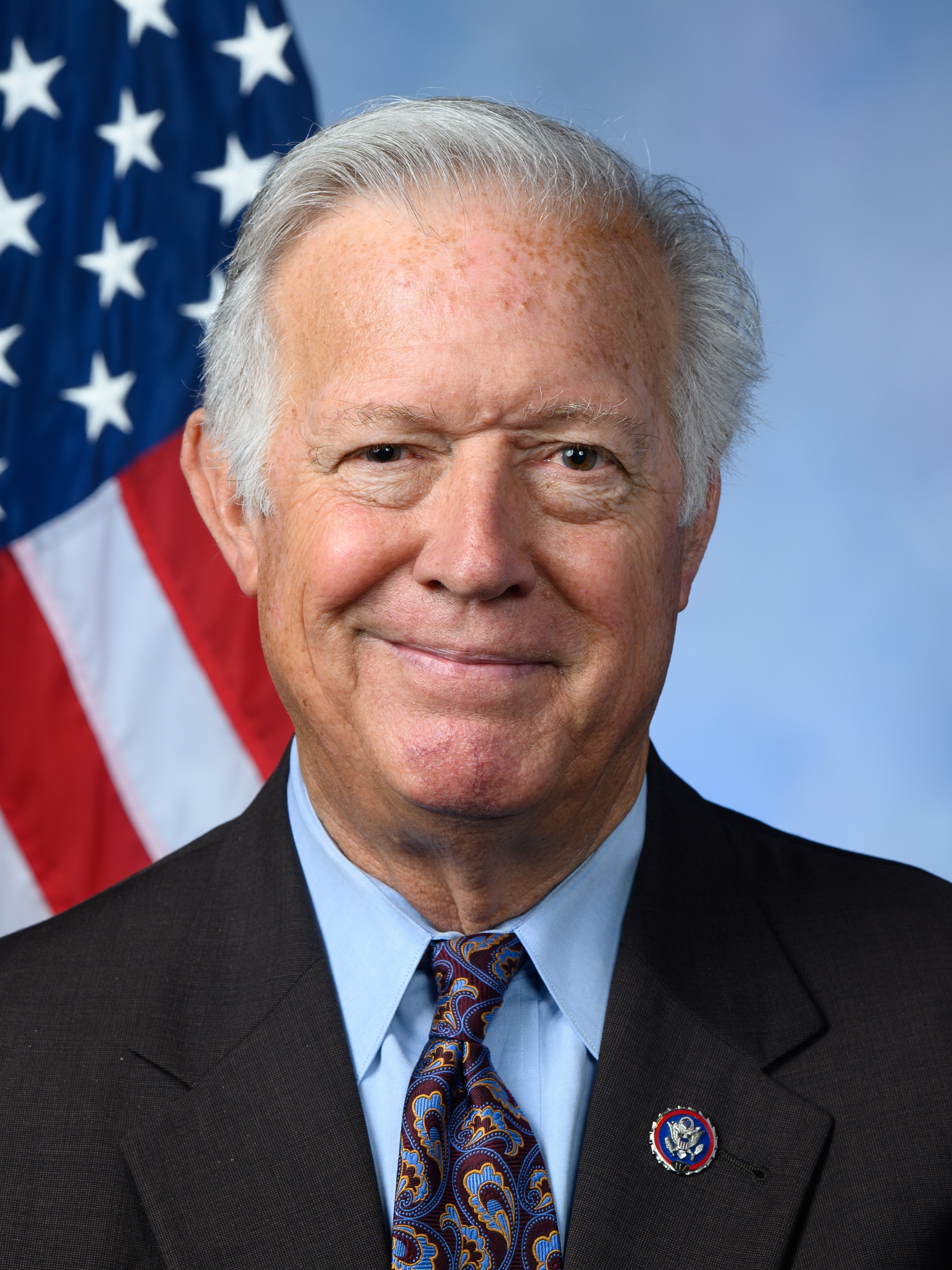

Nominee	Randy Weber	Mikal Williams
Party	Republican	Democratic
Popular vote	149,543	68,606
Percentage	68.55%	31.45%
- County results Weber: 60–70% 70–80% 80–90%
U.S. Representative before election
Randy Weber
Republican
Elected U.S. Representative
Randy Weber
Republican

The 14th district takes in the southern and southeastern region of Greater Houston, including Galveston, Jefferson County and southern Brazoria County. The incumbent was Republican Randy Weber, who was reelected with 61.6% of the vote in 2020.

=== Republican primary ===
==== Candidates ====
===== Nominee =====
- Randy Weber, incumbent U.S. representative

===== Eliminated in primary =====
- Keith Casey, accountant and perennial candidate
- Ruben Landon Dante, actor

==== Endorsements ====
Randy Weber

Executive branch officials

- Donald Trump, 45th president of the United States (2017–2021)

Organizations

- National Rifle Association-Political Victory Fund

==== Results ====
Republican primary results
Party	Candidate	Votes	%
Republican	Randy Weber (incumbent)	58,439	89.3
Republican	Keith Casey	5,178	7.9
Republican	Ruben Landon Dante	1,854	2.8
Total votes		65,471	100.0

=== Democratic primary ===
==== Candidates ====
===== Nominee =====
- Mikal Williams, attorney

===== Eliminated in primary =====
- Eugene Howard, educator

==== Results ====
Democratic primary results
Party	Candidate	Votes	%
Democratic	Mikal Williams	10,691	50.2
Democratic	Eugene Howard	10,619	49.8
Total votes		21,310	100.0

=== General election ===
==== Predictions ====
Source	Ranking	As of
The Cook Political Report	Solid R	October 25, 2021
Inside Elections	Solid R	November 15, 2021
Sabato's Crystal Ball	Safe R	November 11, 2021
Politico	Solid R	April 5, 2022
RCP	Safe R	June 9, 2022
Fox News	Solid R	July 11, 2022
DDHQ	Solid R	July 20, 2022
538	Solid R	June 30, 2022
The Economist	Safe R	September 28, 2022

==== Results ====
Official sources list Williams as having received 63,606 votes, but a reporting error from Galveston County undercounted his vote total by 5,000 votes.

Texas's 14th congressional district, 2022
Party	Candidate	Votes	%
Republican	Randy Weber (incumbent)	149,543	68.55
Democratic	Mikal Williams	68,606	31.45
Total votes		218,149	100.0

== District 15 ==
2022 Texas's 15th congressional district election
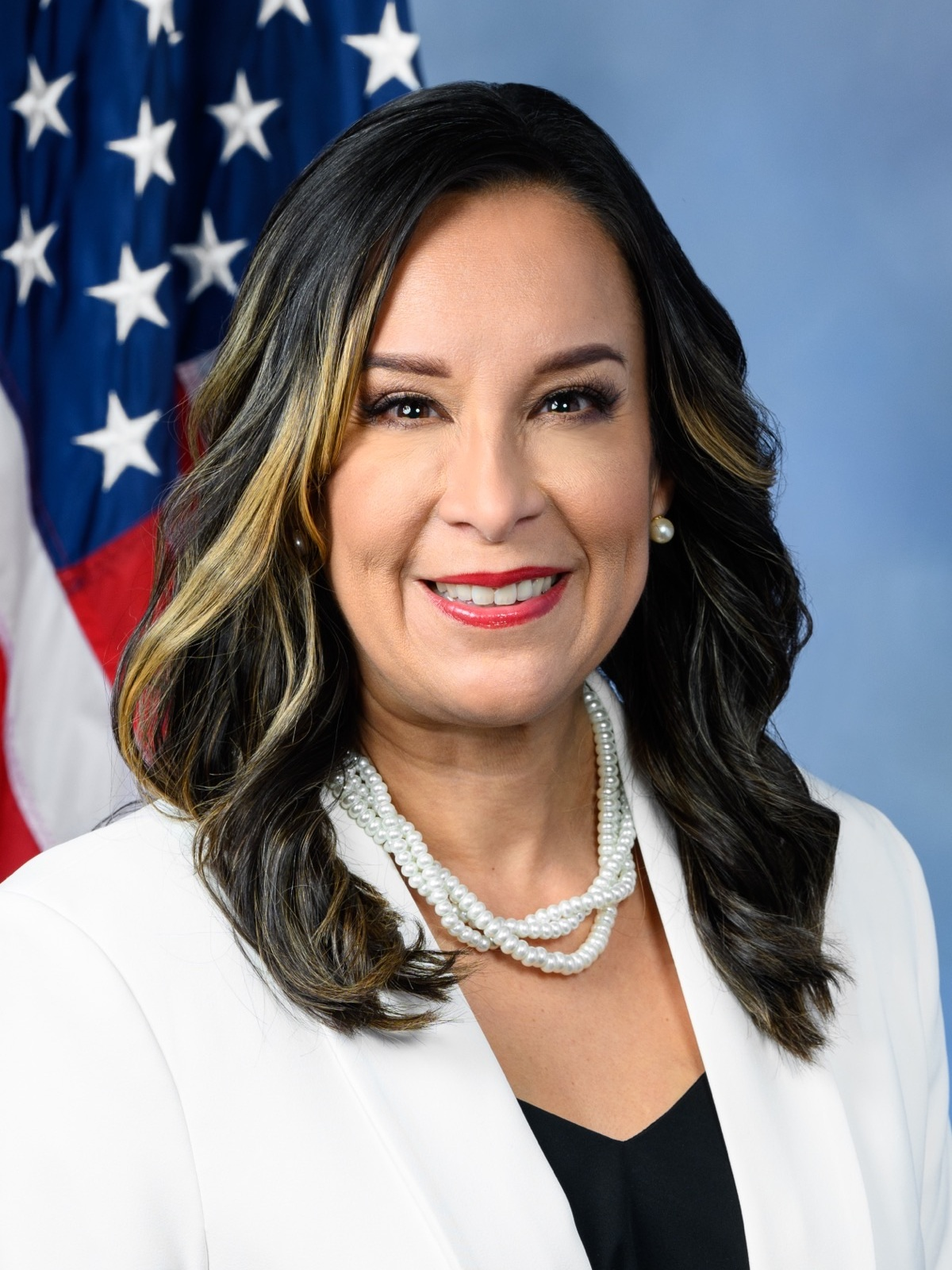

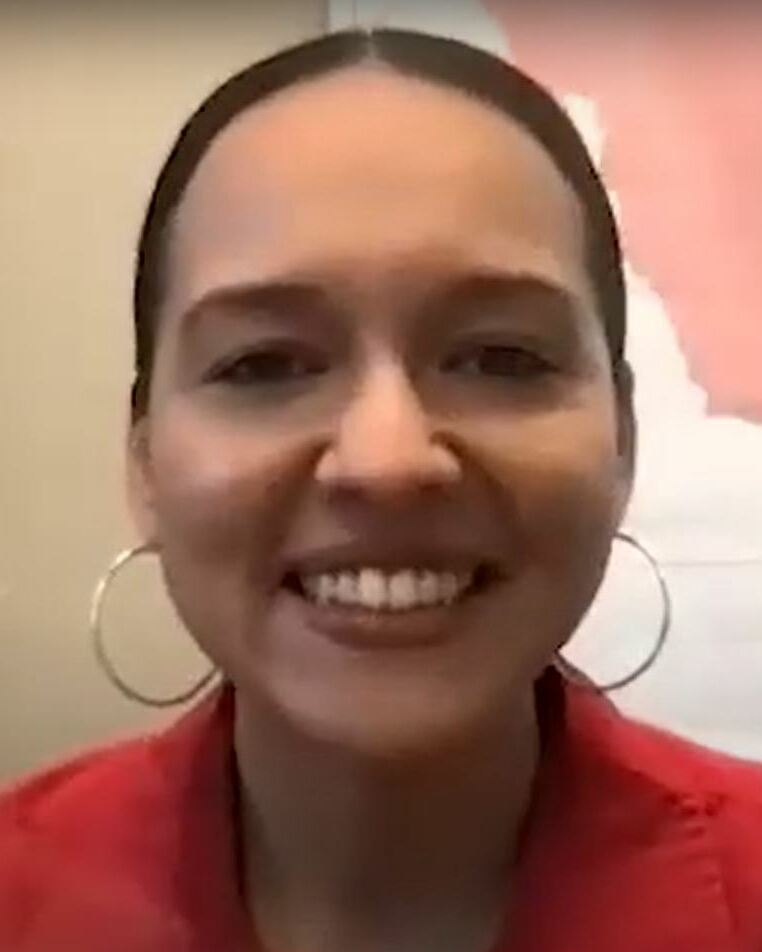
Nominee	Monica De La Cruz	Michelle Vallejo
Party	Republican	Democratic
Popular vote	80,978	68,097
Percentage	53.31%	44.83%
- County results De La Cruz: 50–60% 70–80% 80–90% Vallejo: 50–60% 60–70%
U.S. Representative before election
Vicente Gonzalez
Democratic
Elected U.S. Representative
Monica De La Cruz
Republican

The 15th district stretches from western Hidalgo County in the Rio Grande Valley, northward into rural counties in the Greater San Antonio area. The incumbent was Democrat Vicente Gonzalez, who was reelected with 50.5% of the vote in 2020. On October 26, 2021, Gonzalez announced that he would run for election in the neighboring 34th district, while still serving District 15 until 2023. The district was also significant as, despite its historical Democratic lean, Donald Trump came within two points of winning it in 2020, and the newly drawn 15th is even more Republican than its predecessor.

This district was included on the list of Democratic-held seats that the National Republican Congressional Committee was targeting in 2022.

=== Democratic primary ===
==== Candidates ====
===== Nominee =====
- Michelle Vallejo, flea market owner

===== Eliminated in runoff =====
- Ruben Ramirez, U.S. Army veteran, trial attorney, and candidate for this seat in 2016

===== Eliminated in primary =====
- Eliza Alvarado, former employee for the United States Department of Labor (endorsed Vallejo in runoff)
- Julio Garza, activist (endorsed Vallejo in general)
- John Rigney, attorney (endorsed Vallejo in runoff)
- Vanessa Tijerina, nurse

===== Declined =====
- Vicente Gonzalez, incumbent U.S. representative (running in Texas's 34th congressional district)

=== Endorsements ===
Ruben Ramirez

U.S. representatives

- Pete Aguilar, U.S. representative for CA-31
- Nanette Barragán, U.S. representative for CA-44 (2017–present)
- Salud Carbajal, U.S. representative for CA-24 (2017–present)
- Lou Correa, U.S. representative for CA-46 (2017–present)
- Ruben Gallego, U.S. representative for AZ-07
- Vicente Gonzalez, U.S. representative for TX-15 (2017–present)
- Linda Sánchez, U.S. representative for CA-38 (2013–present)

Organizations

- 314 Action
- Blue Dog PAC
- Democratic Majority for Israel
- New Politics
- VoteVets.org
Michelle Vallejo

U.S. senators

- Bernie Sanders, U.S. senator from Vermont
- Elizabeth Warren, U.S. senator from Massachusetts

U.S. representatives

- Colin Allred, U.S. representative for TX-32
- Joaquin Castro, U.S. representative for TX-20
- Henry Cuellar, U.S. representative for TX-28
- Lloyd Doggett, former U.S. representative for TX-35
- Veronica Escobar, U.S. representative for TX-16
- Lizzie Fletcher, U.S. representative for TX-7
- Sylvia Garcia, U.S. representative for TX-29
- Vicente Gonzalez, U.S. representative for TX-15
- Ruben Hinojosa, former U.S. representative for TX-15
- Pramila Jayapal, U.S. representative for WA-07
- Beto O'Rourke, former U.S. representative for TX-16 and nominee for governor in 2022
- Lucille Roybal-Allard, U.S. representative for CA-40
- Marc Veasey, U.S. representative for TX-33
- Filemon Vela, former U.S. representative for TX-34

State legislators

- Diego Bernal, state representative
- Terry Canales, state representative
- Jasmine Crockett, state representative and nominee for TX-30 in 2022
- Wendy Davis, former state senator, nominee for governor of Texas in 2014, and nominee for TX-21 in 2020
- Sarah Eckhardt, state senator
- Oscar Longoria, state representative
- Ray Lopez, state representative
- Armando Martinez, state representative
- Sergio Muñoz, Jr., state representative
- Victoria Neave, state representative
- Ron Reynolds, state representative
- Erin Zwiener, state representative

Local officials

- Greg Casar, Austin City Councilmember for 4th district and nominee for TX-35
- Richard Cortez, Hidalgo County judge
- Gilberto Hinojosa, chair of the Texas Democratic Party and former county judge of Cameron County

Labor unions

- Communications Workers of America
- Texas AFL–CIO
- United Farmworkers Union

Organizations

- Brand New Congress
- CHC BOLD PAC
- Congressional Progressive Caucus
- Democracy for America
- EMILY's List
- End Citizens United
- Latino Victory Fund
- League of Conservation Voters
- NARAL Pro-Choice America
- Stonewall Democrats RGV
- Texas College Democrats
- Working Families Party

Individuals

- Jessica Cisneros, attorney and former candidate for TX-28 in 2020 and 2022

==== Results ====
Democratic primary results
Party	Candidate	Votes	%
Democratic	Ruben Ramirez	9,221	28.3
Democratic	Michelle Vallejo	6,570	20.1
Democratic	John Rigney	6,268	19.2
Democratic	Eliza Alvarado	5,398	16.6
Democratic	Vanessa Tijerina	3,470	10.6
Democratic	Julio Garza	1,693	5.2
Total votes		32,620	100.0

==== Primary runoff ====
===== Polling =====
Poll source	Date(s) administered	Sample size (Note: Key: A – all adults RV – registered voters LV – likely voters V – unclear)	Margin of error	Ruben Ramirez	Michelle Vallejo	Undecided
GBAO (D) (Note: This poll was sponsored by 314 Action, which supported Ruben Ramirez.)	April 13–18, 2022	500 (LV)	± 4.4%	37%	49%	15%
Lake Research Partners (D) (Note: This poll was sponsored by Vallejo's campaign.)	March 23–27, 2022	400 (LV)	± 4.9%	29%	39%	25%

===== Results =====
Democratic primary results
Party	Candidate	Votes	%
Democratic	Michelle Vallejo	6,079	50.1
Democratic	Ruben Ramirez	6,049	49.9
Total votes		12,128	100.0

Runoff results by county Vallejo: 50–60%; Ramirez: 50–60%; 60–70%

=== Republican primary ===
==== Candidates ====
===== Nominee =====
- Monica De La Cruz, insurance agent and nominee for this seat in 2020

===== Eliminated in primary =====
- Sara Canady, Wilson County justice of the peace
- Aizar Cavazos, retired U.S. Border Patrol agent
- Vangela Churchill, high school assistant principal
- Mauro Garza, nightclub owner and nominee for Texas's 20th congressional district in 2020
- Angela Juarez, self-employed
- Ryan Krause, pastor and candidate for this seat in 2020
- John Lerma, retiree
- Steve Schmuker, college professor

===== Withdrew =====
- Frank McCaffrey, former broadcast journalist (running in Texas's 34th congressional district)

=== Endorsements ===
Monica de la Cruz

Executive branch officials

- Donald Trump, 45th president of the United States (2017–2021)

U.S. representatives

- Elise Stefanik, U.S. representative for NY-21 (2015–present)

Organizations

- Congressional Leadership Fund
- Maggie's List
- Republican Jewish Coalition PAC
- Texas and Southwestern Cattle Raisers Association PAC

==== Results ====
Republican primary results
Party	Candidate	Votes	%
Republican	Monica de la Cruz	16,835	56.5
Republican	Mauro Garza	4,544	15.3
Republican	Sara Canady	2,741	9.2
Republican	Ryan Krause	2,728	9.2
Republican	Steve Schmuker	1,064	3.6
Republican	John Lerma	658	2.2
Republican	Aizar Cavazos	504	1.7
Republican	Angela Juarez	416	1.4
Republican	Vangela Churchill	298	1.0
Total votes		29,788	100.0

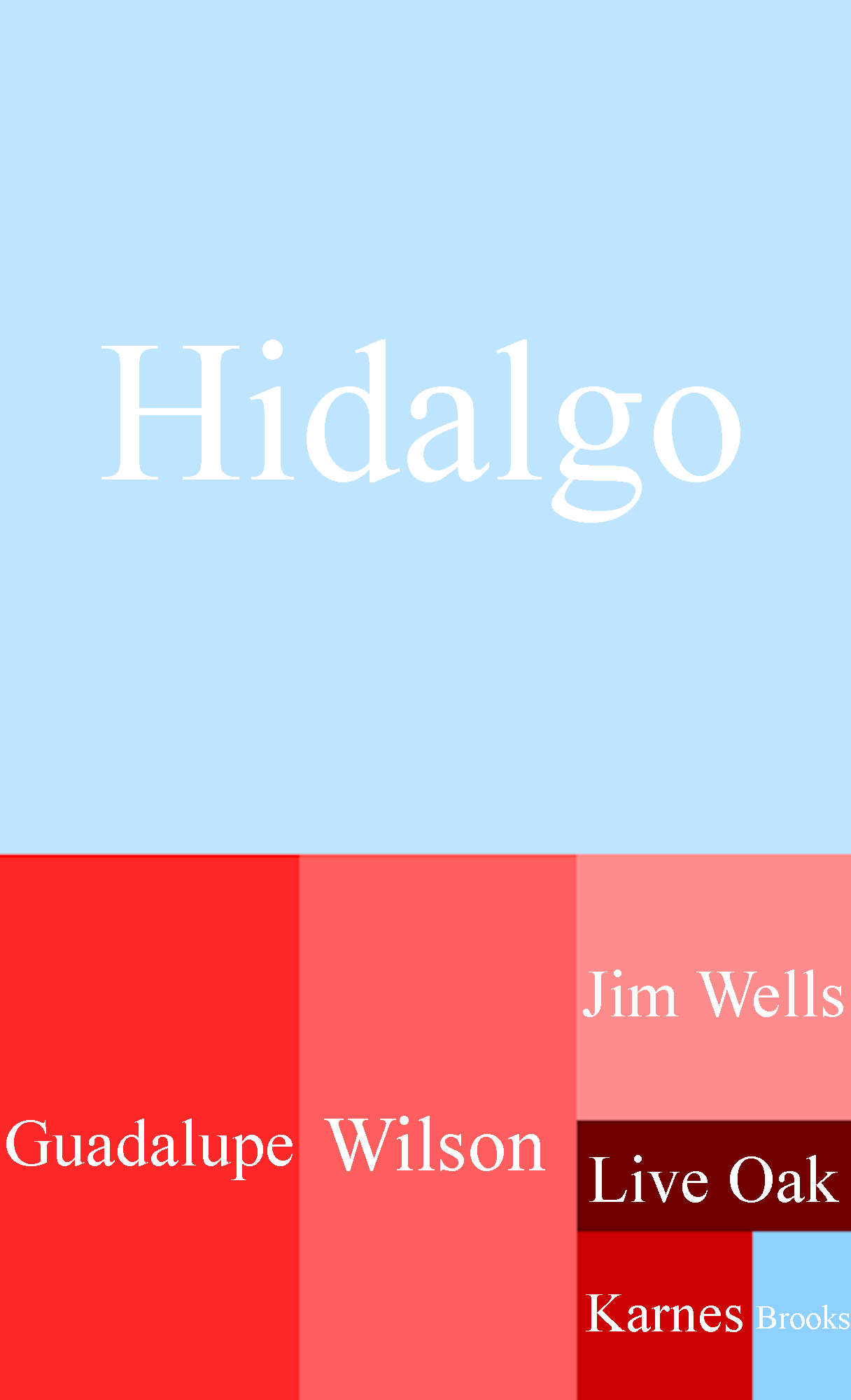
Cartogram of Texas's 15th congressional district

=== General election ===
==== Predictions ====
Source	Ranking	As of
The Cook Political Report	Likely R (flip)	October 5, 2022
Inside Elections	Lean R (flip)	August 25, 2022
Sabato's Crystal Ball	Likely R (flip)	June 15, 2022
Politico	Lean R (flip)	April 5, 2022
RCP	Lean R (flip)	June 9, 2022
Fox News	Lean R (flip)	July 11, 2022
DDHQ	Lean R (flip)	October 17, 2022
538	Tossup	September 23, 2022
The Economist	Lean R (flip)	September 28, 2022

==== Polling ====
Poll source	Date(s) administered	Sample size	Margin of error	Michelle Vallejo (D)	Monica de la Cruz (R)	Other	Undecided
Bendixen & Amandi International (Note: This poll was sponsored by Way to Win, which supported Vallejo.)	October 14–19, 2022	400 (LV)	± 4.9%	45%	45%	5% (Note: Leone with 4%; "Someone else" with 1%)	5%
RMG Research	July 22–29, 2022	400 (LV)	± 4.9%	40%	44%	4%	12%

==== Results ====
Texas's 15th congressional district, 2022
Party	Candidate	Votes	%
Republican	Monica De La Cruz	80,978	53.31
Democratic	Michelle Vallejo	68,097	44.83
Libertarian	Ross Leone	2,814	1.85
Total votes		151,889	100.0

== District 16 ==
2022 Texas's 16th congressional district election
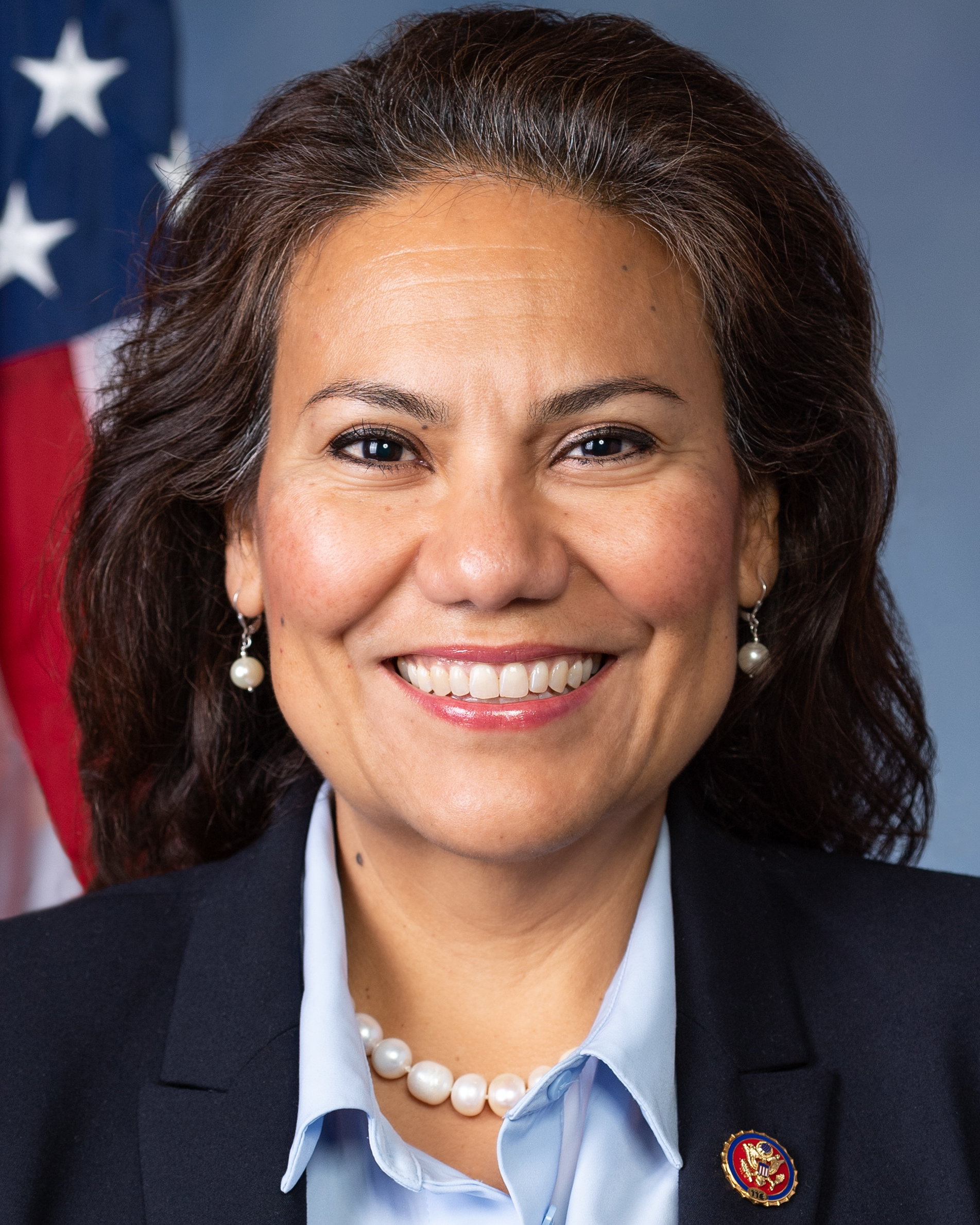

Nominee	Veronica Escobar	Irene Armendariz-Jackson
Party	Democratic	Republican
Popular vote	95,510	54,986
Percentage	63.46%	36.54%
- Escobar: 50–60% 60–70% 70–80% 80–90% Armendariz-Jackson: 50–60% Tie: 50% No votes
U.S. Representative before election
Veronica Escobar
Democratic
Elected U.S. Representative
Veronica Escobar
Democratic

The 16th district is entirely within El Paso County, taking in El Paso, Horizon City, and Anthony. The incumbent was Democrat Veronica Escobar, who was reelected with 64.7% of the vote in 2020.

=== Democratic primary ===
==== Candidates ====
===== Nominee =====
- Veronica Escobar, incumbent U.S. representative

===== Eliminated in primary =====
- Deliris Montanez Berrios, retired medical worker

==== Endorsements ====
Veronica Escobar

Labor unions

- Texas AFL–CIO
- United Auto Workers

Organizations

- Feminist Majority PAC
- Giffords
- League of Conservation Voters
- NARAL Pro-Choice America
- National Women's Political Caucus
- Progressive Change Campaign Committee
- Sierra Club
- Texas College Democrats

==== Results ====
Democratic primary results
Party	Candidate	Votes	%
Democratic	Veronica Escobar (incumbent)	30,954	88.0
Democratic	Deliris Montanez Berrios	4,235	12.0
Total votes		35,189	100.0

=== Republican primary ===
==== Candidates ====
===== Nominee =====
- Irene Armendariz-Jackson, realtor and nominee for this seat in 2020

===== Withdrew =====
- Samuel Williams Jr, candidate for this seat in 2020

==== Results ====
Republican primary results
Party	Candidate	Votes	%
Republican	Irene Armendariz-Jackson	12,623	100.0
Total votes		12,623	100.0

=== General election ===
==== Post-primary endorsements ====
Irene Armendariz-Jackson

US House representatives

- Mayra Flores, US House representative from Texas

==== Predictions ====
Source	Ranking	As of
The Cook Political Report	Solid D	October 25, 2021
Inside Elections	Solid D	November 15, 2021
Sabato's Crystal Ball	Safe D	November 11, 2021
Politico	Solid D	April 5, 2022
RCP	Safe D	June 9, 2022
Fox News	Solid D	July 11, 2022
DDHQ	Solid D	July 20, 2022
538	Solid D	June 30, 2022
The Economist	Safe D	September 28, 2022

==== Results ====
Texas's 16th congressional district, 2022
Party	Candidate	Votes	%
Democratic	Veronica Escobar (incumbent)	95,510	63.46
Republican	Irene Armendariz-Jackson	54,986	36.54
Total votes		150,496	100.0

== District 17 ==
2022 Texas's 17th congressional district election
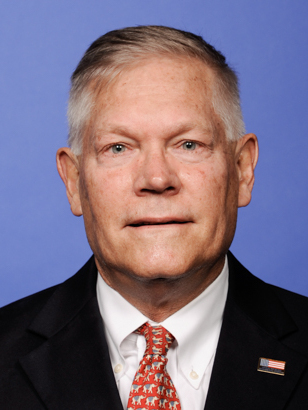

Nominee	Pete Sessions	Mary Jo Woods
Party	Republican	Democratic
Popular vote	144,408	72,801
Percentage	66.48%	33.52%
- County results Sessions: 60–70% 70–80% 80–90% Woods: 50–60% 60–70%
U.S. Representative before election
Pete Sessions
Republican
Elected U.S. Representative
Pete Sessions
Republican

The 17th district covers parts of suburban north Austin stretching to rural central and eastern Texas, including Waco and Lufkin. The incumbent was Republican Pete Sessions, who was reelected with 55.9% of the vote in 2020.

=== Republican primary ===
==== Candidates ====
===== Nominee =====
- Pete Sessions, incumbent U.S. representative

===== Eliminated in primary =====
- Paulette Carson, retired Bible studies publisher
- Jason "Stormchaser" Nelson, U.S. Army veteran
- Rob Rosenberger, businessman

==== Endorsements ====
Pete Sessions

Organizations

- National Rifle Association Political Victory Fund

==== Results ====
Republican primary results
Party	Candidate	Votes	%
Republican	Pete Sessions (incumbent)	48,222	70.0
Republican	Jason "Stormchaser" Nelson	8,371	12.1
Republican	Paulette Carson	7,246	10.5
Republican	Rob Rosenberger	5,100	7.4
Total votes		68,939	100.0

=== Democratic primary ===
==== Candidates ====
===== Nominee =====
- Mary Jo Woods, H-E-B employee

==== Endorsements ====
Mary Jo Woods

Labor unions

- Texas AFL–CIO
- United Auto Workers

==== Results ====
Democratic primary results
Party	Candidate	Votes	%
Democratic	Mary Jo Woods	17,085	100.0
Total votes		17,085	100.0

=== General election ===
==== Predictions ====
Source	Ranking	As of
The Cook Political Report	Solid R	October 25, 2021
Inside Elections	Solid R	November 15, 2021
Sabato's Crystal Ball	Safe R	November 11, 2021
Politico	Solid R	April 5, 2022
RCP	Safe R	June 9, 2022
Fox News	Solid R	July 11, 2022
DDHQ	Solid R	July 20, 2022
538	Solid R	June 30, 2022
The Economist	Safe R	September 28, 2022

==== Results ====
Texas's 17th congressional district, 2022
Party	Candidate	Votes	%
Republican	Pete Sessions (incumbent)	144,408	66.48
Democratic	Mary Jo Woods	72,801	33.52
Total votes		217,209	100.0

== District 18 ==
2022 Texas's 18th congressional district election
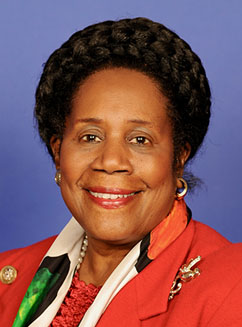

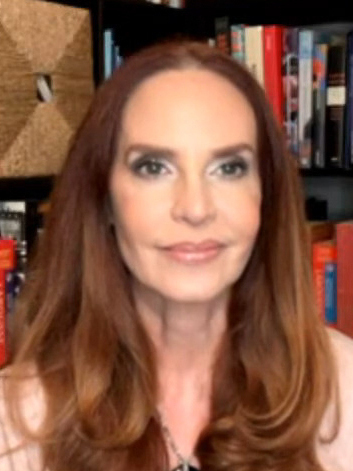
Nominee	Sheila Jackson Lee	Carmen Maria Montiel
Party	Democratic	Republican
Popular vote	110,511	40,941
Percentage	70.72%	26.20%
- Jackson Lee: 40–50% 50–60% 60–70% 70–80% 80–90% ≥90% Montiel: 40–50% 50–60% 70–80% Tie: 40–50% No votes
U.S. Representative before election
Sheila Jackson Lee
Democratic
Elected U.S. Representative
Sheila Jackson Lee
Democratic

The 18th district is based in Downtown Houston and takes in the heavily black areas of Central Houston. The incumbent was Democrat Sheila Jackson Lee, who was reelected with 73.3% of the vote in 2020.

=== Democratic primary ===
==== Candidates ====
===== Nominee =====
- Sheila Jackson Lee, incumbent U.S. representative

=== Endorsements ===
Sheila Jackson Lee

Labor unions

- Texas AFL–CIO
- United Auto Workers

Organizations

- Feminist Majority PAC
- Sierra Club

==== Results ====
Democratic primary results
Party	Candidate	Votes	%
Democratic	Sheila Jackson Lee (incumbent)	35,194	100.0
Total votes		35,194	100.0

=== Republican primary ===
==== Candidates ====
===== Nominee =====
- Carmen Maria Montiel, realtor and former Miss Venezuela

==== Results ====
Republican primary results
Party	Candidate	Votes	%
Republican	Carmen Maria Montiel	11,087	100.0
Total votes		11,087	100.0

=== General election ===
==== Predictions ====
Source	Ranking	As of
The Cook Political Report	Solid D	October 25, 2021
Inside Elections	Solid D	November 15, 2021
Sabato's Crystal Ball	Safe D	November 11, 2021
Politico	Solid D	April 5, 2022
RCP	Safe D	June 9, 2022
Fox News	Solid D	July 11, 2022
DDHQ	Solid D	July 20, 2022
538	Solid D	June 30, 2022
The Economist	Safe D	September 28, 2022

==== Results ====
Texas's 18th congressional district, 2022
Party	Candidate	Votes	%
Democratic	Sheila Jackson Lee (incumbent)	110,511	70.72
Republican	Carmen Maria Montiel	40,941	26.20
Independent	Vince Duncan	2,766	1.77
Libertarian	Phil Kurtz	2,050	1.31
Total votes		156,268	100.0

== District 19 ==
2022 Texas's 19th congressional district election
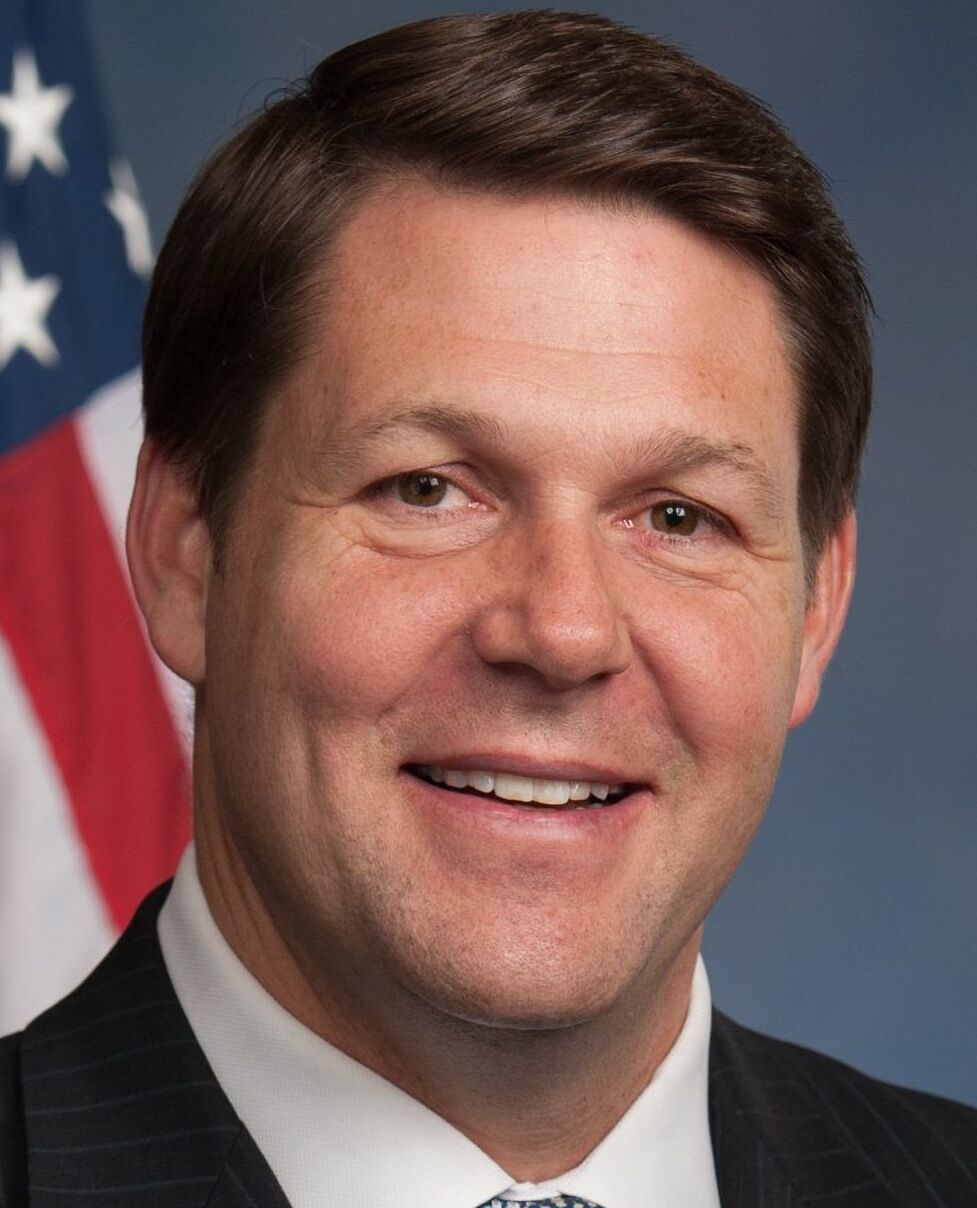

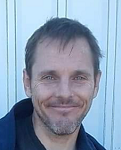
Nominee	Jodey Arrington	Nathan Lewis
Party	Republican	Independent
Popular vote	152,321	37,360
Percentage	80.30%	19.70%
- County results Arrington: 70–80% 80–90% ≥90%
U.S. Representative before election
Jodey Arrington
Republican
Elected U.S. Representative
Jodey Arrington
Republican

The 19th district encompasses rural West Texas, taking in Lubbock and Abilene. The incumbent was Republican Jodey Arrington, who was reelected with 74.8% of the vote in 2020. He ran for reelection against Independent Nathan Lewis of Lubbock.

=== Republican primary ===
==== Candidates ====
===== Nominee =====
- Jodey Arrington, incumbent U.S. representative

==== Endorsements ====
Jodey Arrington

Executive branch officials

- Donald Trump, 45th president of the United States (2017–2021)

==== Results ====
Republican primary results
Party	Candidate	Votes	%
Republican	Jodey Arrington (incumbent)	68,503	100.0
Total votes		68,503	100.0

=== General election ===
==== Predictions ====
Source	Ranking	As of
The Cook Political Report	Solid R	October 25, 2021
Inside Elections	Solid R	November 15, 2021
Sabato's Crystal Ball	Safe R	November 11, 2021
Politico	Solid R	April 5, 2022
RCP	Safe R	June 9, 2022
Fox News	Solid R	July 11, 2022
DDHQ	Solid R	July 20, 2022
538	Solid R	June 30, 2022
The Economist	Safe R	September 28, 2022

==== Results ====
|- class=vcard

Texas's 19th congressional district, 2022
Party	Candidate	Votes	%
Republican	Jodey Arrington (incumbent)	152,321	80.30
Independent	Nathan Lewis	37,360	19.70
Total votes		189,681	100.0

== District 20 ==
2022 Texas's 20th congressional district election
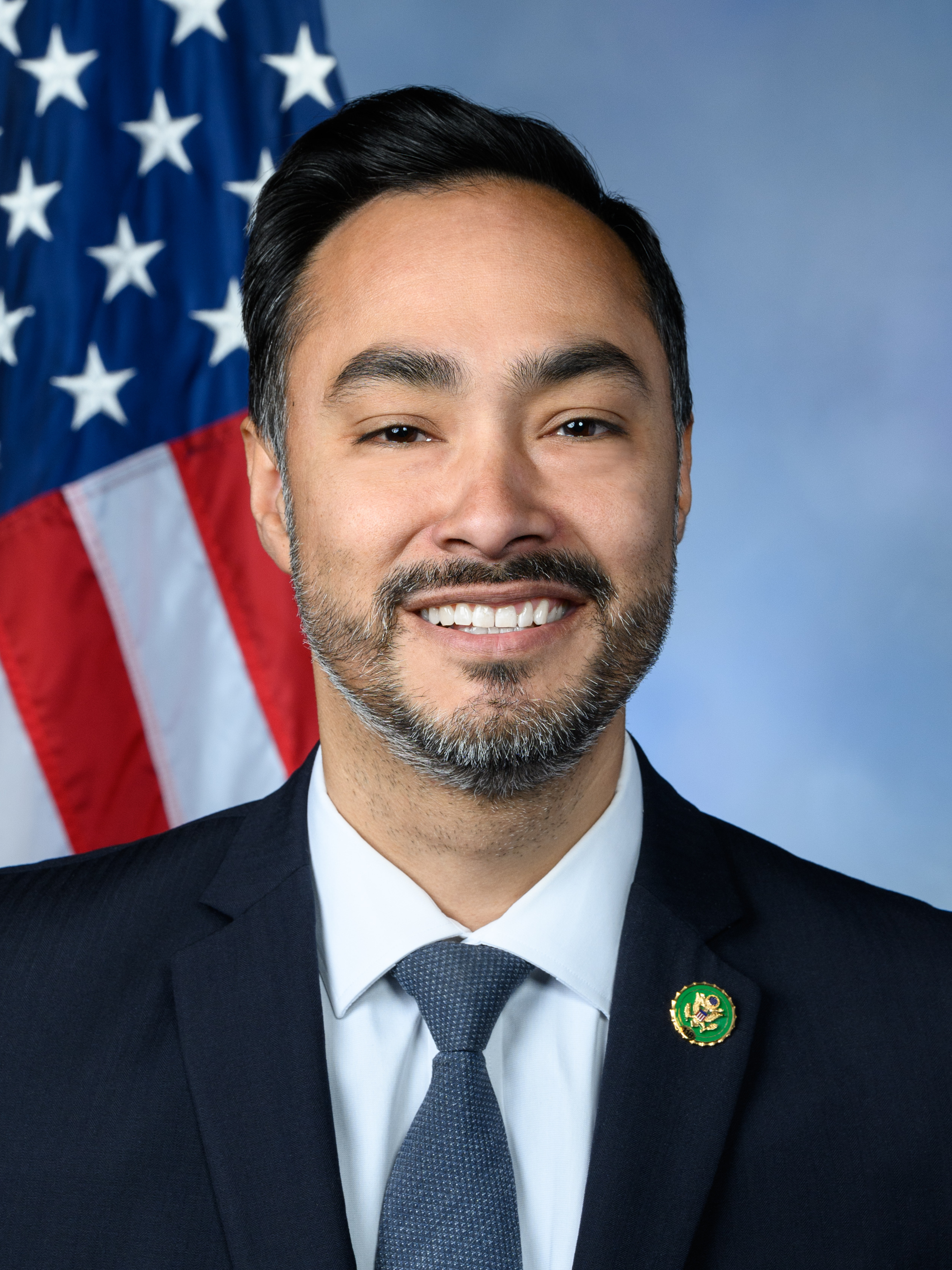

Nominee	Joaquin Castro	Kyle Sinclair
Party	Democratic	Republican
Popular vote	115,352	53,226
Percentage	68.42%	31.57%
- Castro: 50–60% 60–70% 70–80% 80–90% ≥90% Sinclair: 50–60% 60–70% ≥90% No vote
U.S. Representative before election
Joaquin Castro
Democratic
Elected U.S. Representative
Joaquin Castro
Democratic

The 20th district encompasses downtown San Antonio. The incumbent was Democrat Joaquin Castro, who was reelected with 64.7% of the vote in 2020.

=== Democratic primary ===
==== Candidates ====
===== Nominee =====
- Joaquin Castro, incumbent U.S. representative

==== Endorsements ====
Joaquin Castro

Organizations

- Feminist Majority PAC
- Sierra Club
- Stonewall Democrats

Labor unions

- Texas AFL–CIO
- United Auto Workers

==== Results ====
Democratic primary results
Party	Candidate	Votes	%
Democratic	Joaquin Castro (incumbent)	33,214	100.0
Total votes		33,214	100.0

=== Republican primary ===
==== Candidates ====
===== Nominee =====
- Kyle Sinclair, healthcare executive and U.S. Army veteran

==== Results ====
Republican primary results
Party	Candidate	Votes	%
Republican	Kyle Sinclair	15,846	100.0
Total votes		15,846	100.0

=== General election ===
==== Predictions ====
Source	Ranking	As of
The Cook Political Report	Solid D	October 25, 2021
Inside Elections	Solid D	November 15, 2021
Sabato's Crystal Ball	Safe D	November 11, 2021
Politico	Solid D	April 5, 2022
RCP	Safe D	June 9, 2022
Fox News	Solid D	July 11, 2022
DDHQ	Solid D	July 20, 2022
538	Solid D	June 30, 2022
The Economist	Safe D	September 28, 2022

==== Results ====
Texas's 20th congressional district, 2022
Party	Candidate	Votes	%
Democratic	Joaquin Castro (incumbent)	115,352	68.42
Republican	Kyle Sinclair	53,226	31.57
Write-in	Adam Jonasz	21	0.01
Total votes		168,599	100.0

== District 21 ==
2022 Texas's 21st congressional district election
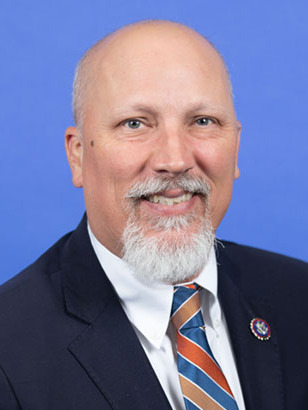

Nominee	Chip Roy	Claudia Zapata
Party	Republican	Democratic
Popular vote	207,426	122,655
Percentage	62.84%	37.16%
- County results Roy: 50–60% 70–80% 80–90% Zapata: 50–60%
U.S. Representative before election
Chip Roy
Republican
Elected U.S. Representative
Chip Roy
Republican

The 21st district extends from north San Antonio to central and south Austin, taking in rural parts of the Texas Hill Country. The incumbent was Republican Chip Roy, who was elected with 52.0% of the vote in 2020.

=== Republican primary ===
==== Candidates ====
===== Nominee =====
- Chip Roy, incumbent U.S. representative

===== Eliminated in primary =====
- Michael French, functional analyst and U.S. Army veteran
- Robert Lowry, physician and candidate for Texas's 23rd congressional district in 2014
- Dana Zavorka, disabilities mobility specialist

==== Endorsements ====
Chip Roy

Organizations

- Club for Growth
- Family Research Council Action PAC
- FreedomWorks
- National Rifle Association-Political Victory Fund

==== Results ====
Republican primary results
Party	Candidate	Votes	%
Republican	Chip Roy (incumbent)	78,087	83.2
Republican	Robert Lowry	7,642	8.2
Republican	Dana Zavorka	4,206	4.5
Republican	Michael French	3,886	4.1
Total votes		93,821	100.0

=== Democratic primary ===
==== Candidates ====
===== Nominee =====
- Claudia Zapata, community activist (previously filed to run in Texas's 35th congressional district)

===== Eliminated in runoff =====
- Ricardo Villareal, physician and U.S. Army veteran

===== Eliminated in primary =====
- David Anderson Jr., nonprofit founder (previously filed to run in Texas's 35th congressional district)
- Coy Branscum, animal welfare worker
- Cherif Gacis, former chairman of the Veteran Affairs Committee for San Marcos
- Michael Smith, business owner
- Scott Sturm, paramedic

==== Endorsements ====
Claudia Zapata

Newspapers and other media

- The Austin Chronicle (dual endorsement of Zapata and Branscum)

Organizations

- Stonewall Democrats

Labor unions

- Texas AFL–CIO
- United Auto Workers
Coy Branscum

Newspapers and other media

- The Austin Chronicle (dual endorsement of Zapata and Branscum)

==== Results ====
Democratic primary results
Party	Candidate	Votes	%
Democratic	Claudia Zapata	16,604	47.2
Democratic	Ricardo Villareal	9,590	27.3
Democratic	Coy Branscum	3,157	9.0
Democratic	David Anderson	3,038	8.6
Democratic	Scott Sturm	1,865	5.3
Democratic	Cherif Gacis	902	2.6
Total votes		35,156	100.0

==== Primary runoff results ====
Democratic primary results
Party	Candidate	Votes	%
Democratic	Claudia Zapata	13,886	63.5
Democratic	Ricardo Villareal	7,996	36.5
Total votes		21,882	100.0

=== General election ===
==== Predictions ====
Source	Ranking	As of
The Cook Political Report	Solid R	October 25, 2021
Inside Elections	Solid R	November 15, 2021
Sabato's Crystal Ball	Safe R	November 11, 2021
Politico	Solid R	April 5, 2022
RCP	Safe R	June 9, 2022
Fox News	Solid R	July 11, 2022
DDHQ	Solid R	July 20, 2022
538	Solid R	June 30, 2022
The Economist	Safe R	September 28, 2022

==== Results ====
Texas's 21st congressional district, 2022
Party	Candidate	Votes	%
Republican	Chip Roy (incumbent)	207,426	62.84
Democratic	Claudia Zapata	122,655	37.16
Total votes		330,081	100.0

== District 22 ==
2022 Texas's 22nd congressional district election
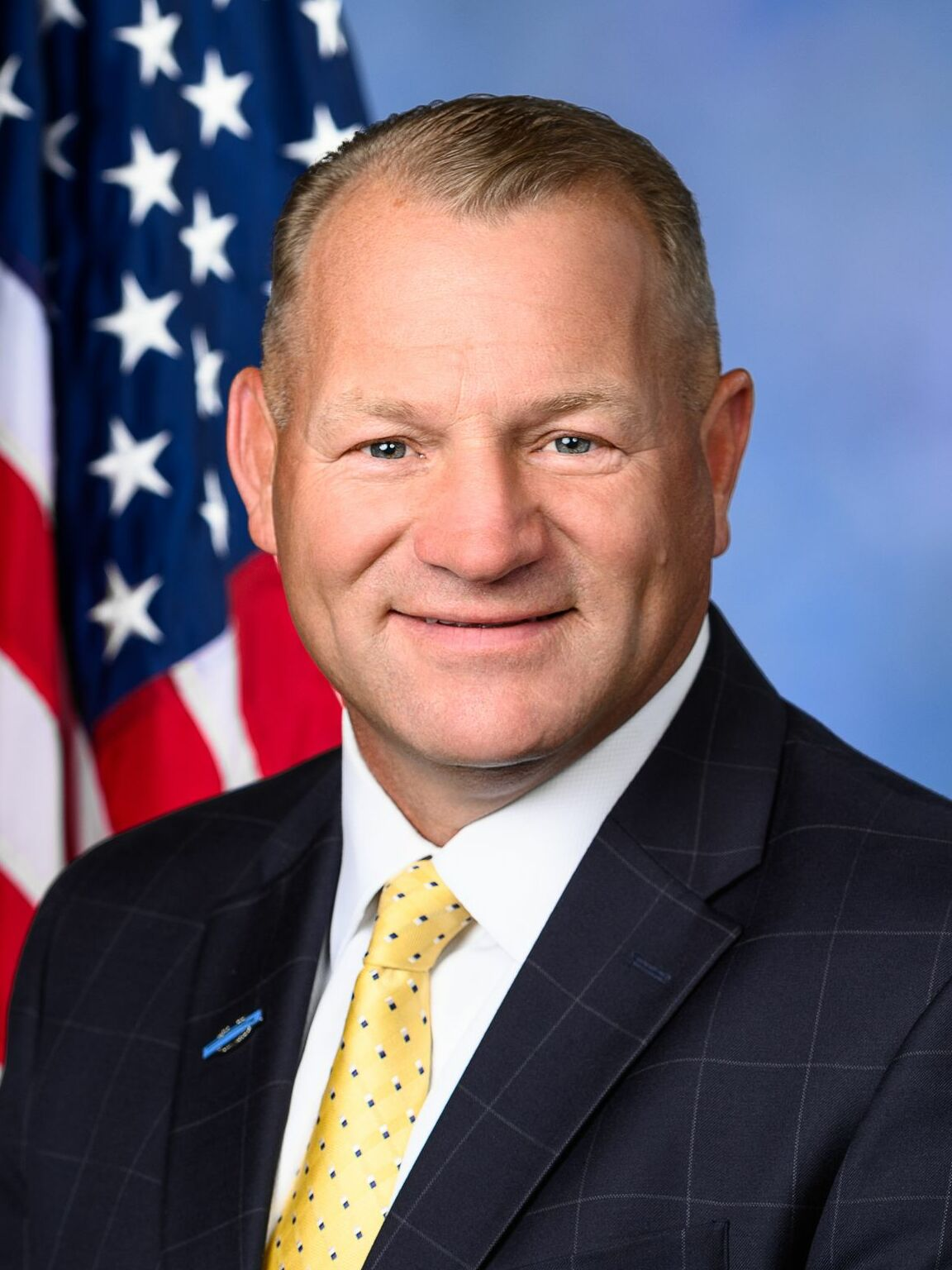

Nominee	Troy Nehls	Jamie Kaye Jordan
Party	Republican	Democratic
Popular vote	150,014	85,653
Percentage	62.19%	35.51%
- County results Nehls: 60–70% 70–80%
U.S. Representative before election
Troy Nehls
Republican
Elected U.S. Representative
Troy Nehls
Republican

The 22nd district encompasses the south-central Greater Houston metropolitan area, including the southern Houston suburbs of Sugar Land, Pearland, and Webster. The incumbent was Republican Troy Nehls, who was elected with 51.5% of the vote in 2020.

=== Republican primary ===
==== Candidates ====
===== Nominee =====
- Troy Nehls, incumbent U.S. representative

===== Eliminated in primary =====
- Gregory Thorne, accountant

==== Endorsements ====
Troy Nehls

Executive branch officials

- Donald Trump, 45th president of the United States (2017–2021)

Organizations

- National Rifle Association-Political Victory Fund

==== Results ====
Republican primary results
Party	Candidate	Votes	%
Republican	Troy Nehls (incumbent)	50,281	87.2
Republican	Gregory Thorne	7,378	12.8
Total votes		57,659	100.0

=== Democratic primary ===
==== Candidates ====
===== Nominee =====
- Jamie Kaye Jordan, attorney

==== Results ====
Democratic primary results
Party	Candidate	Votes	%
Democratic	Jamie Kaye Jordan	20,818	100.0
Total votes		20,818	100.0

=== General election ===
==== Predictions ====
Source	Ranking	As of
The Cook Political Report	Solid R	October 25, 2021
Inside Elections	Solid R	November 15, 2021
Sabato's Crystal Ball	Safe R	November 11, 2021
Politico	Solid R	April 5, 2022
RCP	Safe R	June 9, 2022
Fox News	Solid R	July 11, 2022
DDHQ	Solid R	July 20, 2022
538	Solid R	June 30, 2022
The Economist	Safe R	September 28, 2022

==== Results ====
Texas's 22nd congressional district, 2022
Party	Candidate	Votes	%
Republican	Troy Nehls (incumbent)	150,014	62.19
Democratic	Jamie Kaye Jordan	85,653	35.51
Libertarian	Joseph LeBlanc	5,378	2.23
Write-in	Jim Squires	170	0.07
Total votes		241,215	100.0

== District 23 ==
2022 Texas's 23rd congressional district election
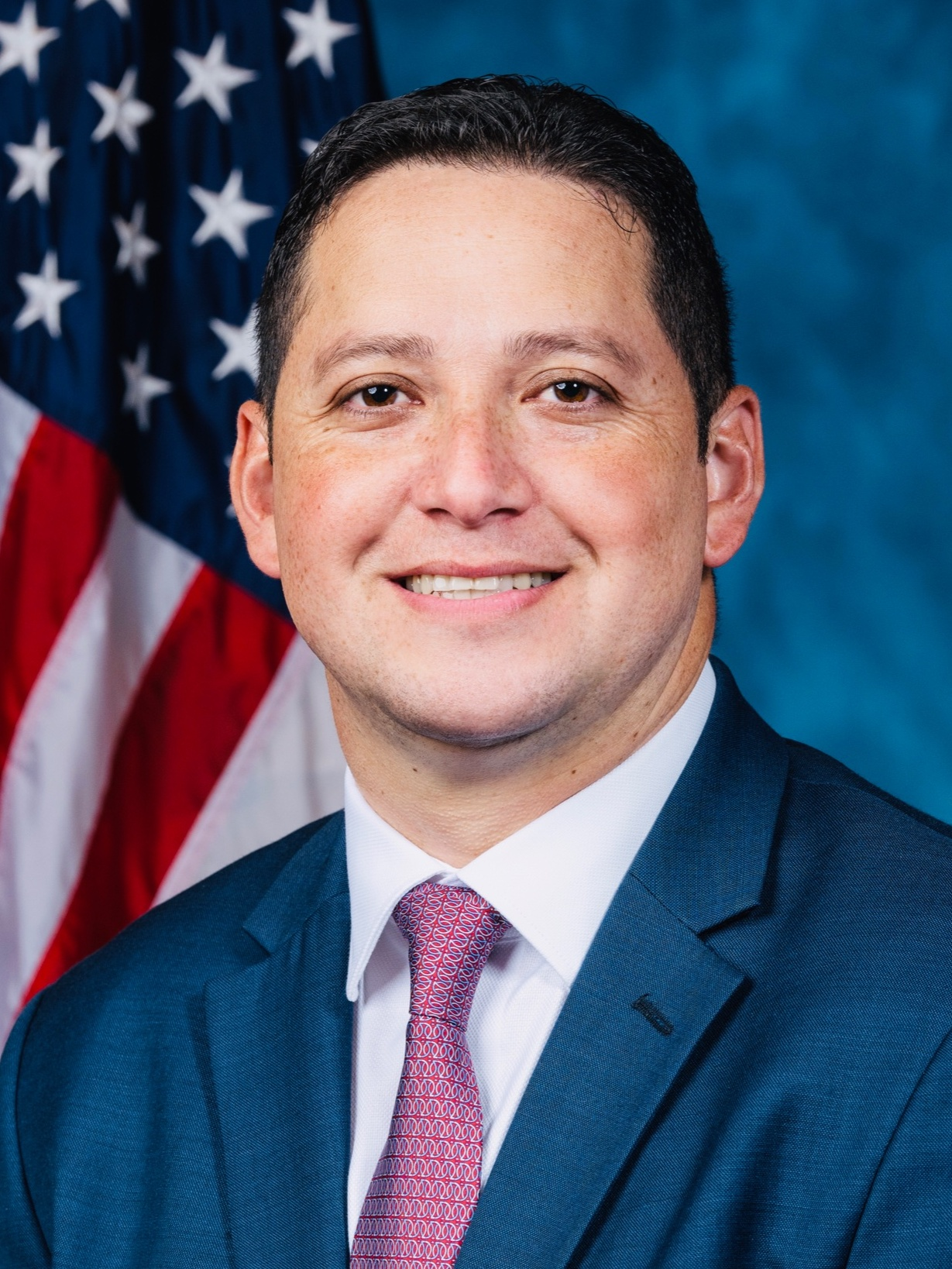

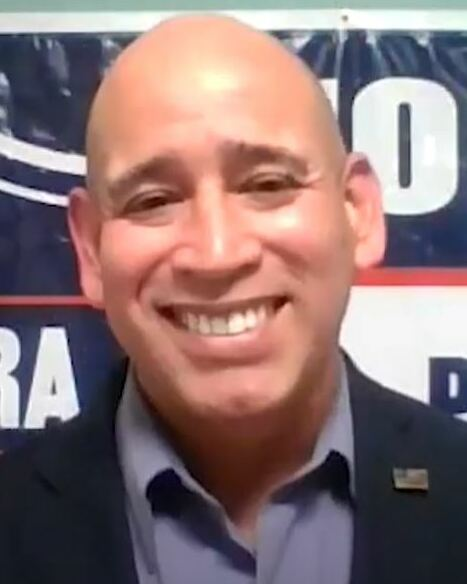

Nominee	Tony Gonzales	John Lira	Frank Lopez Jr.
Party	Republican	Democratic	Independent
Popular vote	116,649	80,947	11,180
Percentage	55.87%	38.77%	5.36%
- County results Gonzales: 40–50% 50–60% 60–70% 70–80% 80–90% Lira: 50–60% 60–70%
U.S. Representative before election
Tony Gonzales
Republican
Elected U.S. Representative
Tony Gonzales
Republican

The 23rd district covers southwestern Texas, including the Big Bend, the southern and western San Antonio suburbs, and the southwestern El Paso suburbs. The incumbent was Republican Tony Gonzales, who was elected with 50.6% of the vote in 2020.

This district was included on the list of Republican-held seats the Democratic Congressional Campaign Committee was targeting in 2022.

=== Republican primary ===
==== Candidates ====
===== Nominee =====
- Tony Gonzales, incumbent U.S. representative

===== Eliminated in primary =====
- Alma Arredondo-Lynch, dentist and rancher
- Alia Garcia, motel owner

==== Endorsements ====
Tony Gonzales

Organizations

- National Rifle Association-Political Victory Fund

==== Results ====
2022 GOP primary results by county: 50–60% Gonzales 60–70% Gonzales 70–80% Gonzales 80–90% Gonzales

Republican primary results
Party	Candidate	Votes	%
Republican	Tony Gonzales (incumbent)	37,212	78.0
Republican	Alma Arredondo-Lynch	7,261	15.2
Republican	Alia Garcia	3,235	6.8
Total votes		47,708	100.0

=== Democratic primary ===
==== Candidates ====
===== Nominee =====
- John Lira, policy analyst and U.S. Marine Corps veteran

===== Eliminated in primary =====
- Priscilla Golden, social worker

==== Endorsements ====
John Lira

U.S. representatives

- Beto O'Rourke, former U.S. representative for TX-16 and nominee for governor in 2022

State legislators

- Cesar Blanco, state senator from the 29th district
- Roland Gutierrez, state senator from the 19th district

Labor unions

- Texas AFL–CIO

Organizations

- BOLD PAC
- Latino Victory Fund
- New Democrat Coalition
- New Politics
- Stonewall Democrats
- VoteVets.org

==== Results ====
Democratic primary results
Party	Candidate	Votes	%
Democratic	John Lira	19,816	55.9
Democratic	Priscilla Golden	15,664	44.1
Total votes		35,480	100.0

=== General election ===
==== Predictions ====
Source	Ranking	As of
The Cook Political Report	Solid R	January 26, 2022
Inside Elections	Solid R	August 25, 2022
Sabato's Crystal Ball	Safe R	April 19, 2022
Politico	Likely R	April 5, 2022
RCP	Safe R	June 9, 2022
Fox News	Solid R	July 11, 2022
DDHQ	Solid R	July 20, 2022
538	Solid R	June 30, 2022
The Economist	Safe R	September 28, 2022

==== Polling ====
Poll source	Date(s) administered	Sample size	Margin of error	Tony Gonzales (R)	John Lira (D)	Frank Lopez Jr. (I)	Other	Undecided
Public Policy Polling (D) (Note: This poll was sponsored by Lira's campaign.)	July 28–29, 2022	452 (V)	± 4.6%	42%	26%	6%	1% (Note: Hart with 1%)	25%

==== Results ====
Texas's 23rd congressional district, 2022
Party	Candidate	Votes	%
Republican	Tony Gonzales (incumbent)	116,649	55.87
Democratic	John Lira	80,947	38.77
Independent	Frank Lopez Jr.	11,180	5.36
Total votes		208,776	100.0

== District 24 ==
2022 Texas's 24th congressional district election
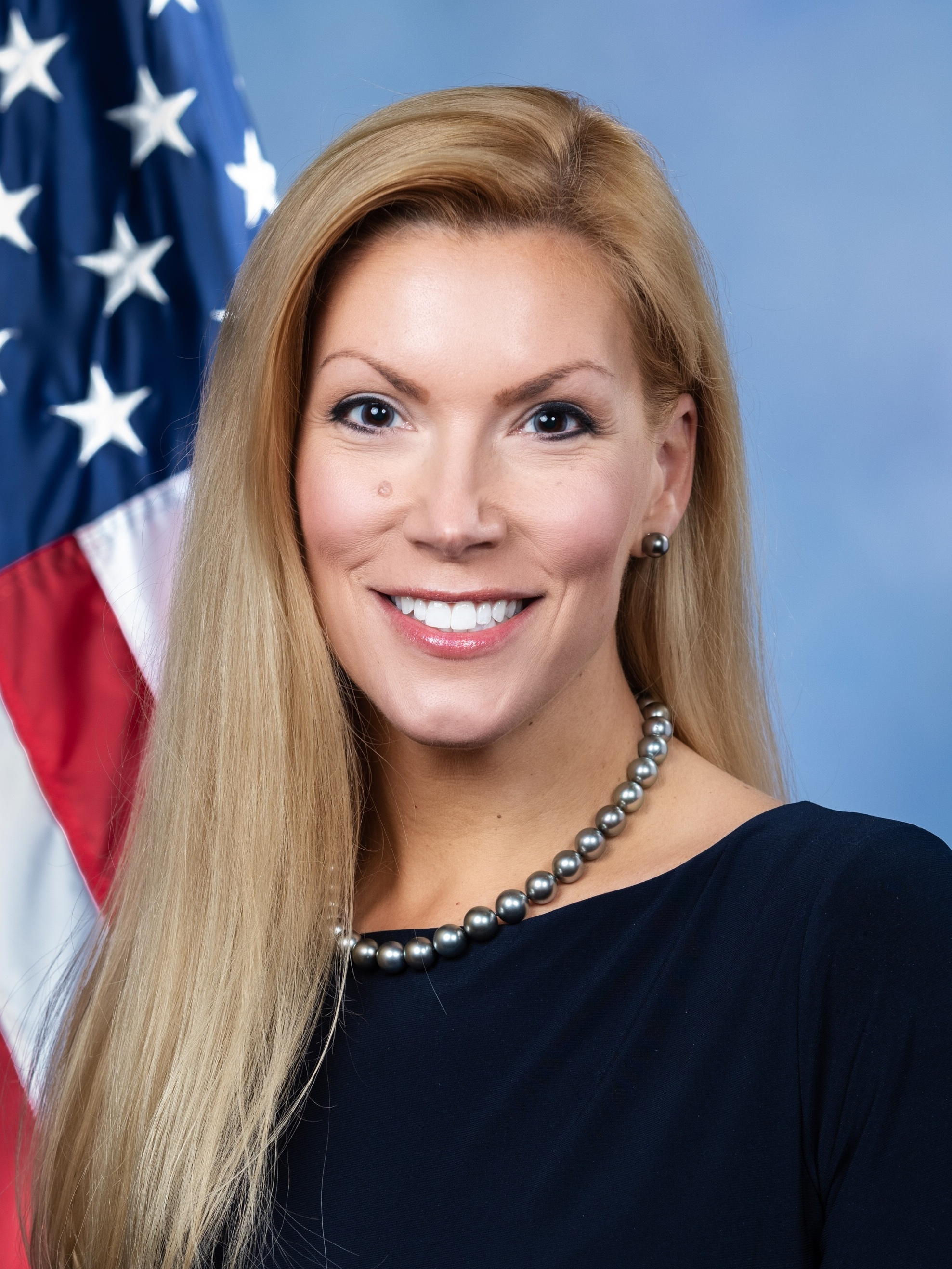

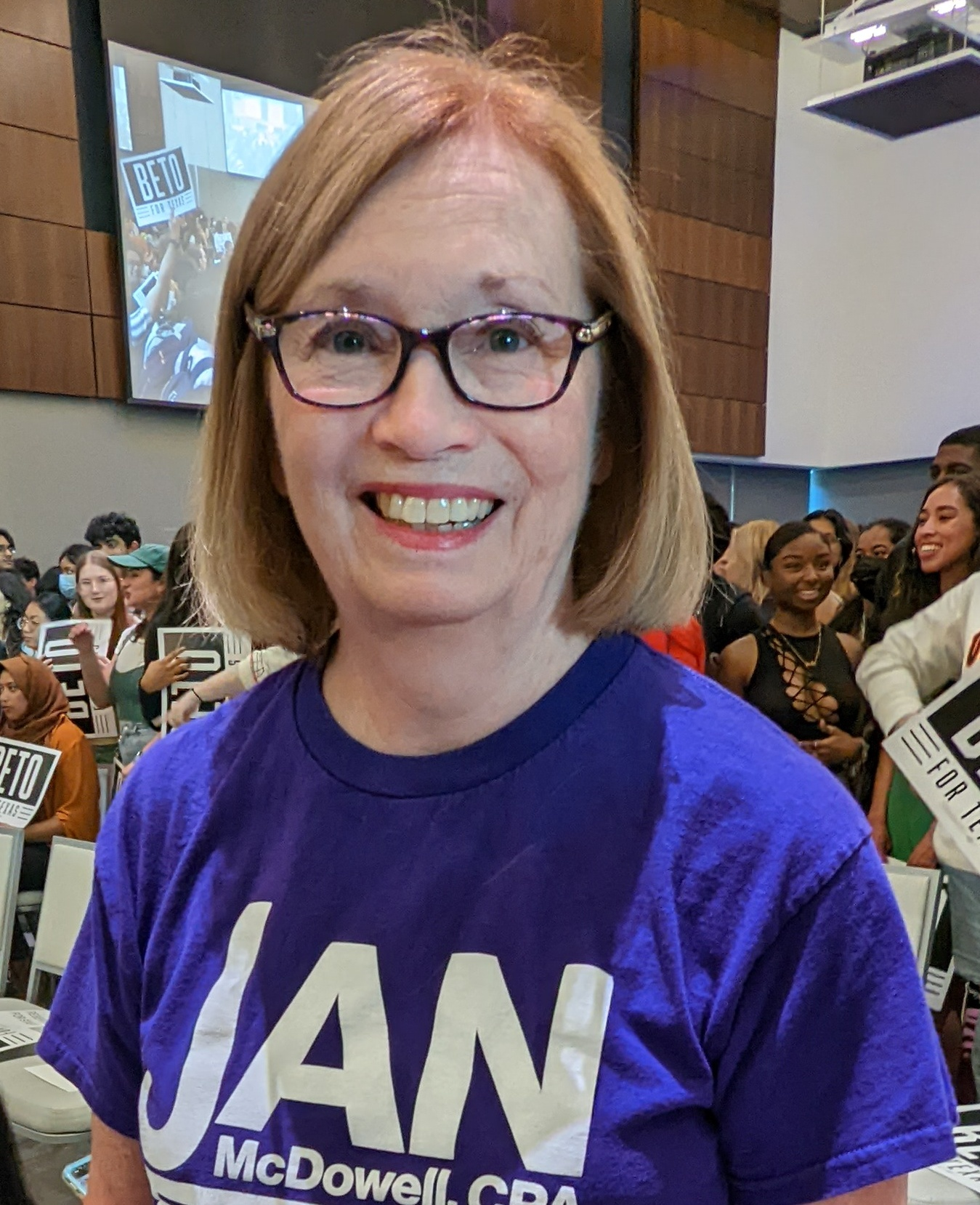
Nominee	Beth Van Duyne	Jan McDowell
Party	Republican	Democratic
Popular vote	177,947	119,878
Percentage	59.75%	40.25%
- Van Duyne: 50–60% 60–70% 70–80% 80–90% ≥90% McDowell: 50–60% 60–70% ≥90% No votes
U.S. Representative before election
Beth Van Duyne
Republican
Elected U.S. Representative
Beth Van Duyne
Republican

The 24th district encompasses the suburbs north of Fort Worth and Dallas, including Grapevine, Bedford, and the Park Cities. The incumbent was Republican Beth Van Duyne, who was elected with 48.8% of the vote in 2020.

This district was included on the list of Republican-held seats the Democratic Congressional Campaign Committee was targeting in 2022.

=== Republican primary ===
==== Candidates ====
===== Nominee =====
- Beth Van Duyne, incumbent U.S. representative

===== Eliminated in primary =====
- Nate Weymouth, scientist

==== Endorsements ====
Beth Van Duyne

Executive branch officials

- Donald Trump, 45th president of the United States (2017–2021)

Organizations

- Maggie's List
- National Rifle Association-Political Victory Fund
- Turning Point Action

==== Results ====
Republican primary results
Party	Candidate	Votes	%
Republican	Beth Van Duyne (incumbent)	61,768	85.0
Republican	Nate Weymouth	10,868	15.0
Total votes		72,636	100.0

=== Democratic primary ===
==== Candidates ====
===== Nominee =====
- Jan McDowell, public accountant and perennial candidate

===== Eliminated in runoff =====
- Derrik Gay, attorney and U.S. Marine Corps veteran

===== Eliminated in primary =====
- Kathy Fragnoli, attorney and mediator

===== Withdrawn =====
- Michelle Beckley, state representative from the 65th district (running for Lieutenant Governor)

=== Endorsements ===
Derrik Gay

Labor unions

- Texas AFL–CIO

Organizations

- Stonewall Democrats
Jan McDowell

Labor unions

- Alliance for Retired Americans
- Texas AFL–CIO (general election)

==== Results ====
Democratic primary results
Party	Candidate	Votes	%
Democratic	Jan McDowell	11,467	39.3
Democratic	Derrik Gay	9,571	32.8
Democratic	Kathy Fragnoli	8,139	27.9
Total votes		29,177	100.0

==== Primary runoff results ====
Democratic primary results
Party	Candidate	Votes	%
Democratic	Jan McDowell	7,118	51.2
Democratic	Derrik Gay	6,788	48.8
Total votes		13,906	100.0

=== General election ===
==== Predictions ====
Source	Ranking	As of
The Cook Political Report	Solid R	October 25, 2021
Inside Elections	Solid R	November 15, 2021
Sabato's Crystal Ball	Safe R	November 11, 2021
Politico	Solid R	April 5, 2022
RCP	Safe R	June 9, 2022
Fox News	Solid R	July 11, 2022
DDHQ	Solid R	July 20, 2022
538	Solid R	June 30, 2022
The Economist	Safe R	September 28, 2022

==== Results ====
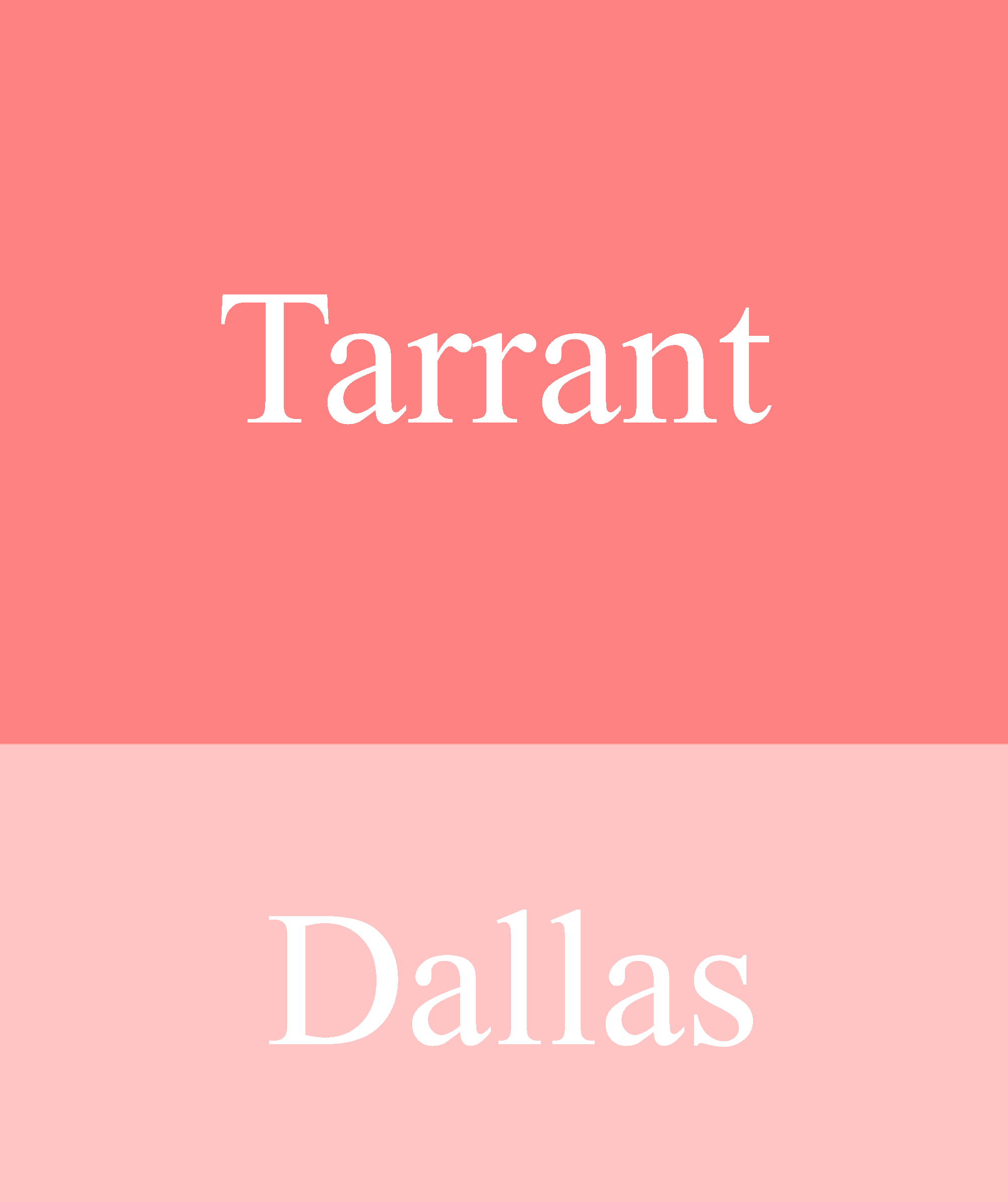
Cartogram of Texas's 24th congressional district

Texas's 24th congressional district, 2022
Party	Candidate	Votes	%
Republican	Beth Van Duyne (incumbent)	177,947	59.75
Democratic	Jan McDowell	119,878	40.25
Total votes		297,825	100.0

== District 25 ==
2022 Texas's 25th congressional district election
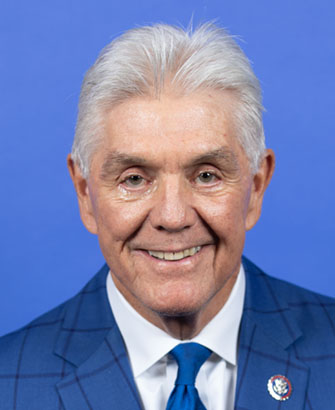
Nominee	Roger Williams
Party	Republican
Popular vote	185,270
Percentage	100.00%
- County results Williams: 100%
U.S. Representative before election
Roger Williams
Republican
Elected U.S. Representative
Roger Williams
Republican

The 25th district runs from Arlington out to rural exurbs of southern Fort Worth such as Granbury. The incumbent was Republican Roger Williams, who was reelected with 55.9% of the vote in 2020.

=== Republican primary ===
==== Candidates ====
===== Nominee =====
- Roger Williams, incumbent U.S. representative

==== Endorsements ====
Roger Williams

Executive branch officials

- Donald Trump, 45th president of the United States (2017–2021)

==== Results ====
Republican primary results
Party	Candidate	Votes	%
Republican	Roger Williams (incumbent)	69,418	100.0
Total votes		69,418	100.0

=== General election ===
==== Predictions ====
Source	Ranking	As of
The Cook Political Report	Solid R	October 25, 2021
Inside Elections	Solid R	November 15, 2021
Sabato's Crystal Ball	Safe R	November 11, 2021
Politico	Solid R	April 5, 2022
RCP	Safe R	June 9, 2022
Fox News	Solid R	July 11, 2022
DDHQ	Solid R	July 20, 2022
538	Solid R	June 30, 2022
The Economist	Safe R	September 28, 2022

==== Results ====
Texas's 25th congressional district, 2022
Party	Candidate	Votes	%
Republican	Roger Williams (incumbent)	185,270	100.00
Total votes		185,270	100.0

== District 26 ==
2022 Texas's 26th congressional district election
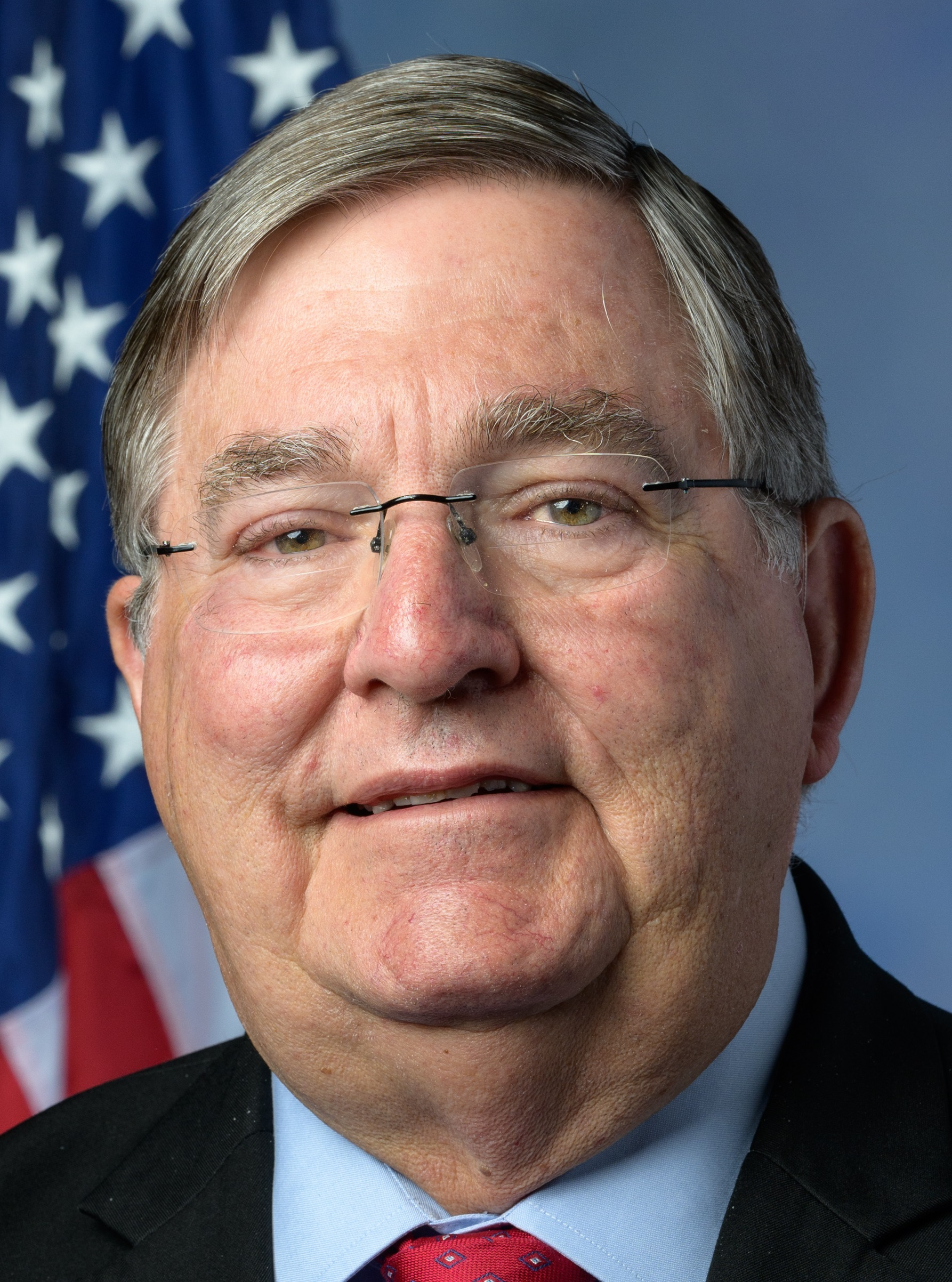

Nominee	Michael Burgess	Mike Kolls
Party	Republican	Libertarian
Popular vote	183,639	81,384
Percentage	69.29%	30.71%
- County results Burgess: 60–70% 80–90% No votes
U.S. Representative before election
Michael Burgess
Republican
Elected U.S. Representative
Michael Burgess
Republican

The 26th district is based in the northern portion of the Dallas–Fort Worth metroplex, centering on eastern Denton County. Before redistricting, the district comprised almost all of Denton County and part of Tarrant. In the newly approved map, Denton, the county seat of Denton County, was removed from the district as well as parts of Frisco, to the 13th and 4th congressional district, respectively. Additionally, Cooke County and parts of Wise County were added to the district. With Denton's removal from the district, Lewisville is the district's largest city. The incumbent was Republican Michael C. Burgess, who was reelected with 60.6% of the vote in 2020.

=== Republican primary ===
==== Candidates ====
===== Nominee =====
- Michael Burgess, incumbent U.S. representative

===== Eliminated in primary =====
- Brian Brazeal, independent investor
- Vincent Gallo, construction contractor
- Raven Harrison, businesswoman
- Isaac Smith, licensed home inspector

==== Endorsements ====
Michael Burgess

Executive branch officials

- Donald Trump, 45th president of the United States (2017–2021)

Organizations

- Citizens for Responsible Energy Solutions
- National Rifle Association-Political Victory Fund

==== Results ====
Republican primary results
Party	Candidate	Votes	%
Republican	Michael Burgess (incumbent)	42,006	66.8
Republican	Vincent Gallo	6,437	10.2
Republican	Brian Brazeal	5,892	9.4
Republican	Isaac Smith	5,085	8.1
Republican	Raven Harrison	3,427	5.5
Total votes		62,847	100.0

=== General election ===
==== Predictions ====
Source	Ranking	As of
The Cook Political Report	Solid R	October 25, 2021
Inside Elections	Solid R	November 15, 2021
Sabato's Crystal Ball	Safe R	November 11, 2021
Politico	Solid R	April 5, 2022
RCP	Safe R	June 9, 2022
Fox News	Solid R	July 11, 2022
DDHQ	Solid R	July 20, 2022
538	Solid R	June 30, 2022
The Economist	Safe R	September 28, 2022

==== Results ====
Texas's 26th congressional district, 2022
Party	Candidate	Votes	%
Republican	Michael Burgess (incumbent)	183,639	69.29
Libertarian	Mike Kolls	81,384	30.71
Total votes		265,023	100.0
Republican hold			

== District 27 ==
2022 Texas's 27th congressional district election
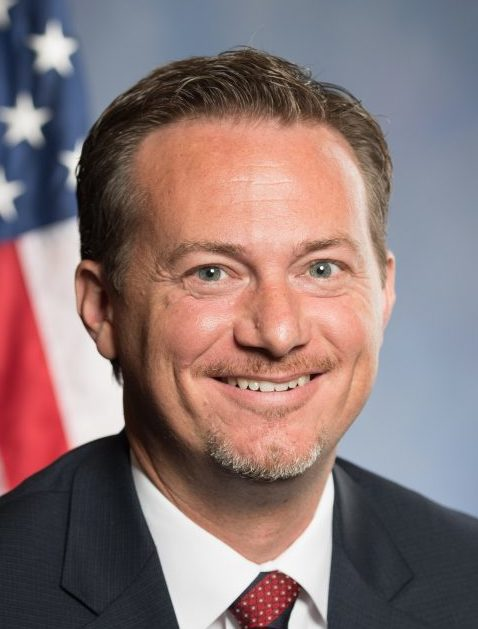

Nominee	Michael Cloud	Maclovio Perez
Party	Republican	Democratic
Popular vote	133,416	73,611
Percentage	64.44%	35.56%
- County results Cloud: 50–60% 60–70% 70–80% 80–90% ≥90%
U.S. Representative before election
Michael Cloud
Republican
Elected U.S. Representative
Michael Cloud
Republican

The 27th district stretches across the Coastal Bend, from Corpus Christi up to Bay City. The incumbent was Republican Michael Cloud, who was reelected with 63.1% of the vote in 2020.

=== Republican primary ===
==== Candidates ====
===== Nominee =====
- Michael Cloud, incumbent U.S. representative

===== Eliminated in primary =====
- Andrew Alvarez, auto dealership consultant
- A.J. Louderback, Jackson County sheriff
- Chris Mapp, retail worker
- Eric Mireles, oil and gas consultant

==== Endorsements ====
Michael Cloud

Executive branch officials

- Donald Trump, 45th president of the United States (2017–2021)

Organizations

- National Rifle Association-Political Victory Fund

==== Results ====
Republican primary results
Party	Candidate	Votes	%
Republican	Michael Cloud (incumbent)	45,741	72.5
Republican	A.J. Louderback	7,704	12.2
Republican	Chris Mapp	4,542	7.2
Republican	Andrew Alvarez	2,648	4.2
Republican	Eric Mireles	2,478	3.9
Total votes		63,113	100.0

=== Democratic primary ===
==== Candidates ====
===== Nominee =====
- Maclovio Perez, broadcaster

===== Eliminated in primary =====
- Victor Melgoza, doctor
- Anthony Tristan, financial consultant

==== Results ====
Democratic primary results
Party	Candidate	Votes	%
Democratic	Maclovio Perez	13,044	59.1
Democratic	Anthony Tristan	5,733	26.0
Democratic	Victor Melgoza	3,289	14.9
Total votes		22,066	100.0

=== General election ===
==== Predictions ====
Source	Ranking	As of
The Cook Political Report	Solid R	October 25, 2021
Inside Elections	Solid R	November 15, 2021
Sabato's Crystal Ball	Safe R	November 11, 2021
Politico	Solid R	April 5, 2022
RCP	Safe R	June 9, 2022
Fox News	Solid R	July 11, 2022
DDHQ	Solid R	July 20, 2022
538	Solid R	June 30, 2022
The Economist	Safe R	September 28, 2022

==== Results ====
Texas's 27th congressional district, 2022
Party	Candidate	Votes	%
Republican	Michael Cloud (incumbent)	133,416	64.44
Democratic	Maclovio Perez	73,611	35.56
Total votes		207,027	100.0

== District 28 ==
2022 Texas's 28th congressional district election
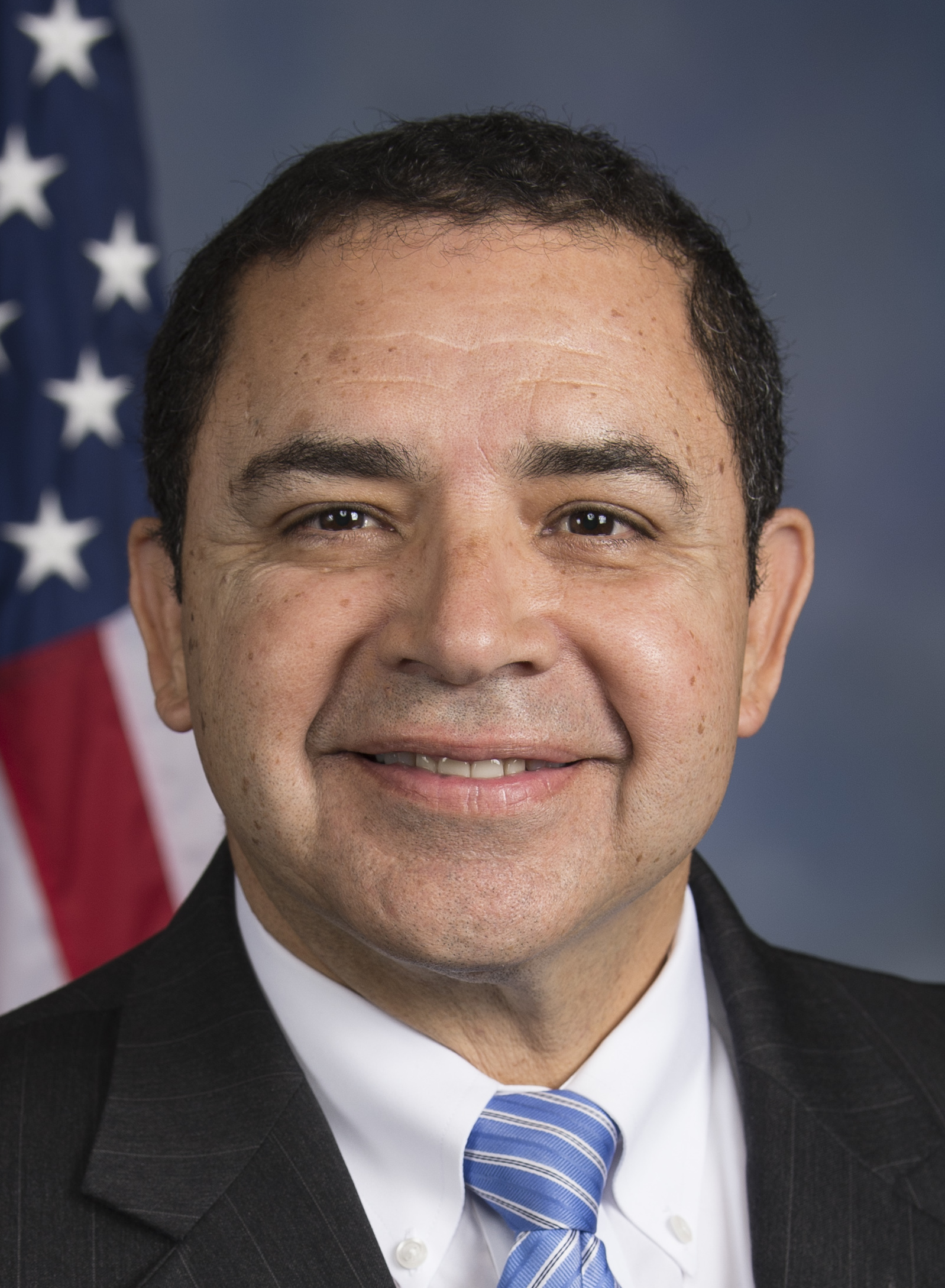

Nominee	Henry Cuellar	Cassy Garcia
Party	Democratic	Republican
Popular vote	93,803	71,778
Percentage	56.65%	43.35%
- County results Cuellar: 50–60% 60–70% 70–80% Garcia: 60–70% 70–80%
U.S. Representative before election
Henry Cuellar
Democratic
Elected U.S. Representative
Henry Cuellar
Democratic

The 28th district is based in the Laredo area and stretches north of the Rio Grande Valley into east San Antonio. The incumbent was Democrat Henry Cuellar, who was reelected with 58.3% of the vote in 2020.

This district was included on the list of Democratic-held seats the National Republican Congressional Committee was targeting in 2022.

=== Democratic primary ===
==== Candidates ====
===== Nominee =====
- Henry Cuellar, incumbent U.S. representative

===== Eliminated in runoff =====
- Jessica Cisneros, attorney and candidate for this seat in 2020

===== Eliminated in primary =====
- Tannya Benavides, teacher (endorsed Cisneros in runoff)

==== Endorsements ====
Jessica Cisneros

U.S. senators

- Ed Markey, U.S. senator from Massachusetts (2013–present)
- Bernie Sanders, U.S. senator from Vermont (2007–present)
- Elizabeth Warren, U.S. senator from Massachusetts (2013–present)

U.S. representatives

- Jamaal Bowman, U.S. representative from NY-16 (2021–present)
- Pramila Jayapal, U.S. representative from WA-07
- Alexandria Ocasio-Cortez, U.S. representative from NY-14 (2019–present)
- Katie Porter, U.S. representative from CA-45 (2019–present)
- Ayanna Pressley, U.S. representative from MA-07 (2019–present)
- Ciro Rodriguez, former U.S. representative from Texas's 28th congressional district and former Texas state representative from the 118th District

State legislators

- Wendy Davis, former state senator (2009–2015), nominee for governor in 2014, and nominee for Texas's 21st congressional district in 2020

Labor unions

- Communication Workers of America Local 6143
- Service Employees International Union
- Texas AFL–CIO
- United Farm Workers

Organizations

- Brand New Congress
- Common Defense
- Democracy for America
- EMILY's List
- End Citizens United
- Indivisible
- J Street PAC
- Justice Democrats
- League of Conservation Voters
- LUPE Votes
- MoveOn
- NARAL Pro-Choice America
- National Nurses United
- Our Revolution
- Patriotic Millionaires
- Peace Action
- Planned Parenthood Action Fund
- Progressive Change Campaign Committee
- Progressive Democrats of America
- Progressive Turnout Project
- Sierra Club
- Stonewall Democrats
- Sunrise Movement
- Texas College Democrats
- Texas Organizing Project
- Way to Lead
- Working Families Party

Newspapers and publications

- Daily Kos
- San Antonio Express-News (Democratic primary only)

Individuals

- Mark Ruffalo
Henry Cuellar

U.S. representatives

- Jim Clyburn, U.S. representative from SC-06 (1993–present) and House Majority Whip
- Steny Hoyer, U.S. representative from MD-05 (1981–present) and House Majority Leader (2019–present)
- Nancy Pelosi, U.S. representative from CA-12 (1987–present) and Speaker of the House (2007–2011; 2019–2023)

Organizations

- Democrats for Life
- International Franchise Association
- Pro-Israel America
- Texas Farm Bureau AGFUND

Names in bold are endorsements made before the run-off but after the primary

==== Polling ====
Poll source	Date(s) administered	Sample size	Margin of error	Jessica Cisneros	Henry Cuellar	Other	Undecided
RMG Research	November 14–21, 2021	400 (LV)	± 4.9%	**36%**	35%	7%	17%

==== Results ====
Primary results by county: Cuellar: 50–60%; 60–70%; 70–80%; Cisneros: 50–60%; 70–80%

Democratic primary results
Party	Candidate	Votes	%
**Democratic**	**Henry Cuellar (incumbent)**	**23,988**	**48.7**
**Democratic**	**Jessica Cisneros**	**22,983**	**46.6**
Democratic	Tannya Benavides	2,324	4.7
Total votes		**49,295**	**100.0**

==== Primary runoff results ====
Primary runoff results by county: Cuellar: 60–70%; 70–80%; 80–90%; Cisneros: 50–60%; 60–70%; 80–90%; 90–100%

Democratic primary results
Party	Candidate	Votes	%
**Democratic**	**Henry Cuellar (incumbent)**	**22,895**	**50.3**
Democratic	Jessica Cisneros	22,614	49.7
Total votes		**45,509**	**100.0**

On the evening of the runoff election, the count had Cuellar leading Cisneros by 177 votes (0.4%). Cuellar's lead increased to 281 votes (0.6%) after provisional and cured ballots were counted. Cisneros filed for a recount on June 7, 2022. The recount confirmed Cuellar's victory by an increased margin of 289 votes.

=== Republican primary ===
==== Candidates ====
===== Nominee =====
- Cassy Garcia, former congressional aide

===== Eliminated in runoff =====
- Sandra Whitten, Sunday school teacher and nominee for this seat in 2020

===== Eliminated in primary =====
- Ed Cabrera, businessman and rancher
- Steven Fowler, combat veteran
- Eric Hohman, management analyst
- Willie Vasquez Ng, former police detective
- Rolando Rodriguez, activist

==== Endorsements ====
Cassy Garcia

Federal officials

- Ted Cruz, U.S. senator from Texas (2013–present)
- Donald Trump, 45th president of the United States (2017–2021)

Labor unions

- National Border Patrol Council
Willie Vasquez Ng

Newspapers and publications

- San Antonio Express-News (Republican primary only)

==== Results ====
Primary results by county: Garcia: 20–30%; 30–40%; Whitten: 20–30%; 30–40%; 50–60%; 60–70%

Republican primary results
Party	Candidate	Votes	%
**Republican**	**Cassy Garcia**	**5,923**	**23.6**
**Republican**	**Sandra Whitten**	**4,534**	**18.0**
Republican	Steven Fowler	3,388	13.5
Republican	Willie Vasquez Ng	3,358	13.4
Republican	Ed Cabrera	3,343	13.3
Republican	Eric Hohman	2,988	11.9
Republican	Rolando Rodriguez	1,622	6.5
Total votes		**25,156**	**100.0**

==== Results ====
Primary runoff results by county: Garcia: 50–60%; 60–70%; Whitten: 60–70%

Republican primary runoff results
Party	Candidate	Votes	%
**Republican**	**Cassy Garcia**	**8,485**	**57.0**
Republican	Sandra Whitten	6,413	43.0
Total votes		**14,898**	**100.0**

=== General election ===
==== Predictions ====
Source	Ranking	As of
The Cook Political Report	Tossup	November 7, 2022
Inside Elections	Lean D	October 7, 2022
Sabato's Crystal Ball	Lean D	November 7, 2022
Politico	Lean D	October 3, 2022
RCP	Tossup	June 9, 2022
Fox News	Tossup	July 11, 2022
DDHQ	Lean D	October 17, 2022
538	Likely D	November 8, 2022
The Economist	Likely D	November 1, 2022

==== Results ====
Texas's 28th congressional district, 2022
Party	Candidate	Votes	%
**Democratic**	**Henry Cuellar (incumbent)**	**93,803**	**56.65%**
Republican	Cassy Garcia	71,778	43.35%
Total votes		**165,581**	**100.0%**

== District 29 ==
2022 Texas's 29th congressional district election
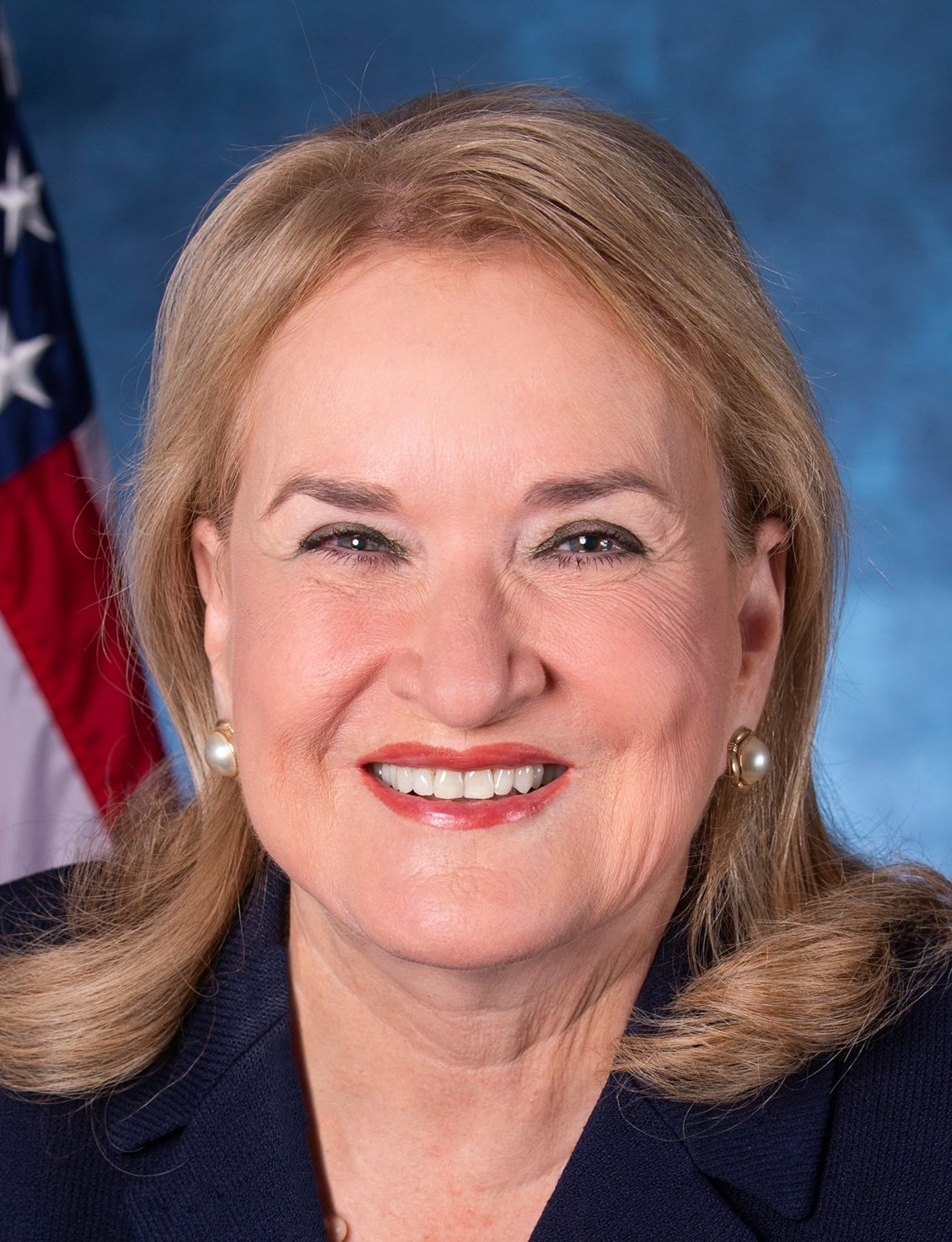

Nominee	Sylvia Garcia	Robert Schafranek
Party	Democratic	Republican
Popular vote	71,837	28,765
Percentage	71.41%	28.59%
- Garcia: 50–60% 60–70% 70–80% 80–90% ≥90% Schafranek: 50–60% 60–70% 70–80% Tie: 50% No votes
U.S. Representative before election
Sylvia Garcia
Democratic
Elected U.S. Representative
Sylvia Garcia
Democratic

The 29th district encompasses parts of northern and southeastern Houston, taking in the heavily Latino areas of the city. The incumbent was Democrat Sylvia Garcia, who was elected with 71.1% of the vote in 2020.

=== Democratic primary ===
==== Candidates ====
===== Nominee =====
- Sylvia Garcia, incumbent U.S. representative

==== Endorsements ====
Sylvia Garcia

Labor unions

- Texas AFL–CIO
- United Auto Workers

Organizations

- Feminist Majority PAC
- Pro-Israel America
- Sierra Club
- Texas College Democrats

==== Results ====
Democratic primary results
Party	Candidate	Votes	%
Democratic	Sylvia Garcia (incumbent)	19,402	100.0
Total votes		19,402	100.0

=== Republican primary ===
==== Candidates ====
===== Nominee =====
- Robert Schafranek, sales associate and perennial candidate

===== Eliminated in runoff =====
- Julio Garza, insurance executive

===== Eliminated in primary =====
- Jaimy Blanco, real estate investor
- Lulite Ejigu, financial executive

==== Results ====
Republican primary results
Party	Candidate	Votes	%
Republican	Robert Schafranek	3,299	39.4
Republican	Julio Garza	2,629	31.4
Republican	Jaimy Blanco	2,212	26.4
Republican	Lulite Ejigu	244	2.9
Total votes		8,384	100.0

==== Primary runoff results ====
Republican primary results
Party	Candidate	Votes	%
Republican	Robert Schafranek	2,875	60.7
Republican	Julio Garza	1,859	39.3
Total votes		4,734	100.0

=== General election ===
==== Predictions ====
Source	Ranking	As of
The Cook Political Report	Solid D	October 25, 2021
Inside Elections	Solid D	November 15, 2021
Sabato's Crystal Ball	Safe D	November 11, 2021
Politico	Solid D	April 5, 2022
RCP	Safe D	June 9, 2022
Fox News	Solid D	July 11, 2022
DDHQ	Solid D	July 20, 2022
538	Solid D	June 30, 2022
The Economist	Safe D	September 28, 2022

==== Results ====
Texas's 29th congressional district, 2022
Party	Candidate	Votes	%
Democratic	Sylvia Garcia (incumbent)	71,837	71.41
Republican	Robert Schafranek	28,765	28.59
Total votes		100,602	100.0

== District 30 ==
2022 Texas's 30th congressional district election
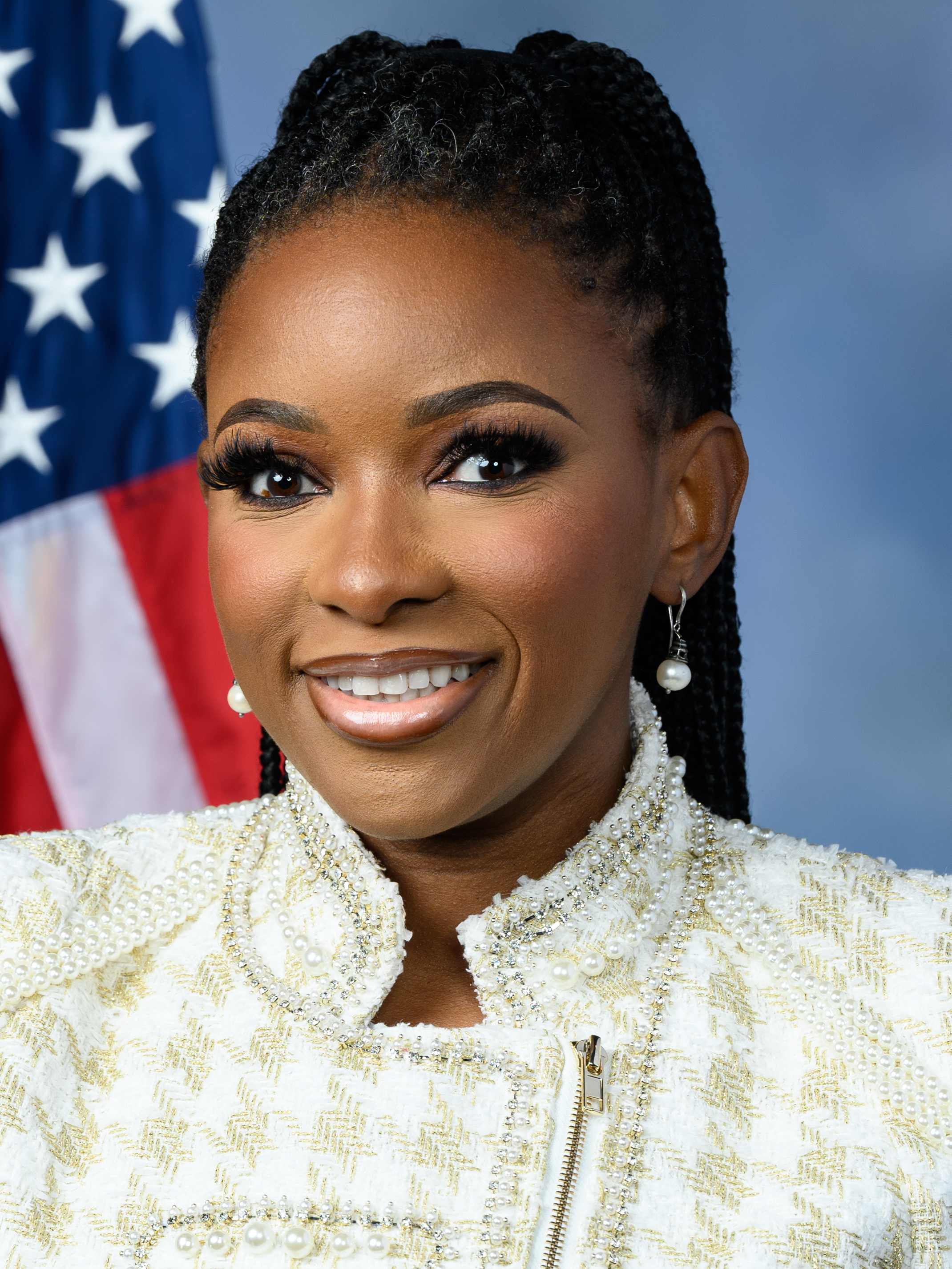

Nominee	Jasmine Crockett	James Rodgers
Party	Democratic	Republican
Popular vote	134,876	39,209
Percentage	74.72%	21.72%
- Crockett: 40–50% 50–60% 60–70% 70–80% 80–90% ≥90% Rodgers: 40–50% 50–60% 70–80% ≥90% Tie: 40–50% 50% No votes
U.S. Representative before election
Eddie Bernice Johnson
Democratic
Elected U.S. Representative
Jasmine Crockett
Democratic

The 30th district encompasses Downtown Dallas as well as South Dallas. The incumbent was Democrat Eddie Bernice Johnson, who was reelected with 77.5% of the vote in 2020. In 2019, Johnson announced that she would not seek reelection after her next term.

=== Democratic primary ===
==== Candidates ====
===== Nominee =====
- Jasmine Crockett, state representative from District 100 (2021–present)

===== Eliminated in runoff =====
- Jane Hope Hamilton, former chief of staff for U.S. Representative Marc Veasey

===== Eliminated in primary =====
- Barbara Mallory Caraway, former state representative and perennial candidate
- Arthur Dixon, community organizer
- Vonciel Jones, former Dallas city councillor
- Jessica Mason, housing administrator and U.S. Navy veteran
- Abel Mulugheta, attorney
- Roy Williams, former Dallas County constable
- Keisha Williams-Lankford, Cedar Hill school board member

===== Declined =====
- Eddie Bernice Johnson, incumbent U.S. representative
- Eric Johnson, mayor of Dallas

==== Endorsements ====
Jasmine Crockett

U.S. senators

- Elizabeth Warren, U.S. senator from Massachusetts

U.S. representatives

- Eddie Bernice Johnson, U.S. representative from TX-30 (1993–present)

Organizations

- Democracy for America
- Giffords (post-primary)
- Our Revolution
- Stonewall Democrats
- Working Families Party

Newspapers and publications

- The Dallas Morning News (Democratic primary only)
Jane Hope Hamilton

Executive branch officials

- Ron Kirk, former United States Trade Representative (2009–2013) and former mayor of Dallas (1995–2002)

U.S. representatives

- Marc Veasey, U.S. representative from TX-33 (2013–present)

State officials

- Beverly Powell, state senator
- Chris Turner, state representative

Local politicians

- John Wiley Price, Dallas county commissioner

Organizations

- Democratic Majority for Israel
Jessica Mason

U.S. representatives

- Seth Moulton, U.S. representative from Massachusetts's 6th congressional district (2015–present)

State officials

- Nina Turner, former member of the Ohio Senate (2008–2014), national co-chair of the Bernie Sanders 2020 presidential campaign and candidate for the United States House of Representatives for OH-11 special election in 2021 and 2022

Individuals

- Marianne Williamson, author and candidate for the Democratic nomination for president of the United States in 2020

Organizations

- Brand New Congress
- Democratic Socialists of America North Texas
- New Politics
- VoteVets.org
Abel Mulugheta

State officials

- Rafael Anchía, state representative

==== Polling ====
Poll source	Date(s) administered	Sample size	Margin of error	Barbara Mallory Caraway	Jasmine Crockett	Jane Hope Hamilton	Jessica Mason	Abel Mulugheta	Undecided
Lester & Associates (D) (Note: This poll was sponsored by Crockett's campaign.)	January 9–12, 2022	400 (LV)	± 4.9%	11%	35%	3%	1%	1%	49%

==== Results ====
Democratic primary results
Party	Candidate	Votes	%
Democratic	Jasmine Crockett	26,798	48.5
Democratic	Jane Hope Hamilton	9,436	17.1
Democratic	Keisha Williams-Lankford	4,323	7.8
Democratic	Barbara Mallory Caraway	4,277	7.7
Democratic	Abel Mulugheta	3,284	5.9
Democratic	Roy Williams	2,746	5.0
Democratic	Vonciel Hill	1,886	3.4
Democratic	Jessica Mason	1,858	3.4
Democratic	Arthur Dixon	677	1.2
Total votes		55,285	100.0

==== Primary runoff results ====
Democratic primary results
Party	Candidate	Votes	%
Democratic	Jasmine Crockett	17,462	60.6
Democratic	Jane Hope Hamilton	11,369	39.4
Total votes		28,831	100.0

=== Republican primary ===
==== Candidates ====
===== Nominee =====
- James Rodgers, job recruiter

===== Eliminated in runoff =====
- James Harris, retiree

===== Eliminated in primary =====
- Lizbeth Diaz, paralegal
- Kelvin Goodwin-Castillo, mechanic
- Kinya Jefferson, self-employed
- Angeigh Roc'ellerpitts, minister

==== Results ====
Republican primary results
Party	Candidate	Votes	%
Republican	James Harris	3,952	32.9
Republican	James Rodgers	3,754	31.3
Republican	Kelvin Goodwin-Castillo	2,023	16.9
Republican	Lizbeth Diaz	1,416	11.8
Republican	Kinya Jefferson	703	5.9
Republican	Angeigh Roc'ellerpitts	160	1.3
Total votes		12,008	100.0

==== Primary runoff results ====
Republican primary results
Party	Candidate	Votes	%
Republican	James Rodgers	3,090	56.9
Republican	James Harris	2,339	43.1
Total votes		5,429	100.0

=== General election ===
==== Predictions ====
Source	Ranking	As of
The Cook Political Report	Solid D	October 25, 2021
Inside Elections	Solid D	November 15, 2021
Sabato's Crystal Ball	Safe D	November 11, 2021
Politico	Solid D	April 5, 2022
RCP	Safe D	June 9, 2022
Fox News	Solid D	July 11, 2022
DDHQ	Solid D	July 20, 2022
538	Solid D	June 30, 2022
The Economist	Safe D	September 28, 2022

==== Results ====
Texas's 30th congressional district, 2022
Party	Candidate	Votes	%
Democratic	Jasmine Crockett	134,876	74.72
Republican	James Rodgers	39,209	21.72
Independent	Zachariah Manning	3,820	2.12
Libertarian	Phil Gray	1,870	1.04
Write-in	Debbie Walker	738	0.41
Total votes		180,513	100.0

== District 31 ==
2022 Texas's 31st congressional district election
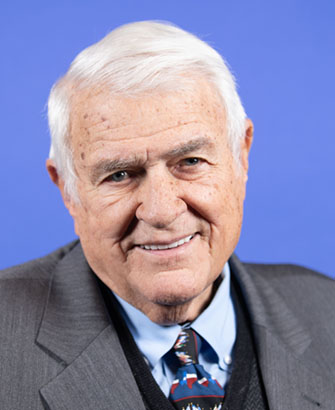
Nominee	John Carter
Party	Republican
Popular vote	183,185
Percentage	100.00%
- County results Carter: 100%
U.S. Representative before election
John Carter
Republican
Elected U.S. Representative
John Carter
Republican

The 31st district encompasses the exurbs of Austin to Temple, including parts of Williamson and Bell counties. The incumbent was Republican John Carter, who was reelected with 53.4% of the vote in 2020.

=== Republican primary ===
==== Candidates ====
===== Nominee =====
- John Carter, incumbent U.S. representative

===== Eliminated in primary =====
- Abhiram Garapati, small business owner and candidate for this seat in 2020
- Mike Williams, retired firefighter and candidate for this seat in 2020

==== Endorsements ====
John Carter

Executive branch officials

- Donald Trump, 45th president of the United States (2017–2021)

Organizations

- National Rifle Association-Political Victory Fund

==== Results ====
Republican primary results
Party	Candidate	Votes	%
Republican	John Carter (incumbent)	50,887	71.1
Republican	Mike Williams	14,115	19.7
Republican	Abhiram Garapati	6,590	9.2
Total votes		71,592	100.0

=== General election ===
==== Predictions ====
Source	Ranking	As of
The Cook Political Report	Solid R	October 25, 2021
Inside Elections	Solid R	November 15, 2021
Sabato's Crystal Ball	Safe R	November 11, 2021
Politico	Solid R	April 5, 2022
RCP	Safe R	June 9, 2022
Fox News	Solid R	July 11, 2022
DDHQ	Solid R	July 20, 2022
538	Solid R	June 30, 2022
The Economist	Safe R	September 28, 2022

==== Results ====
Texas's 31st congressional district, 2022
Party	Candidate	Votes	%
Republican	John Carter (incumbent)	183,185	100.00
Total votes		183,185	100.0

== District 32 ==
2022 Texas's 32nd congressional district election
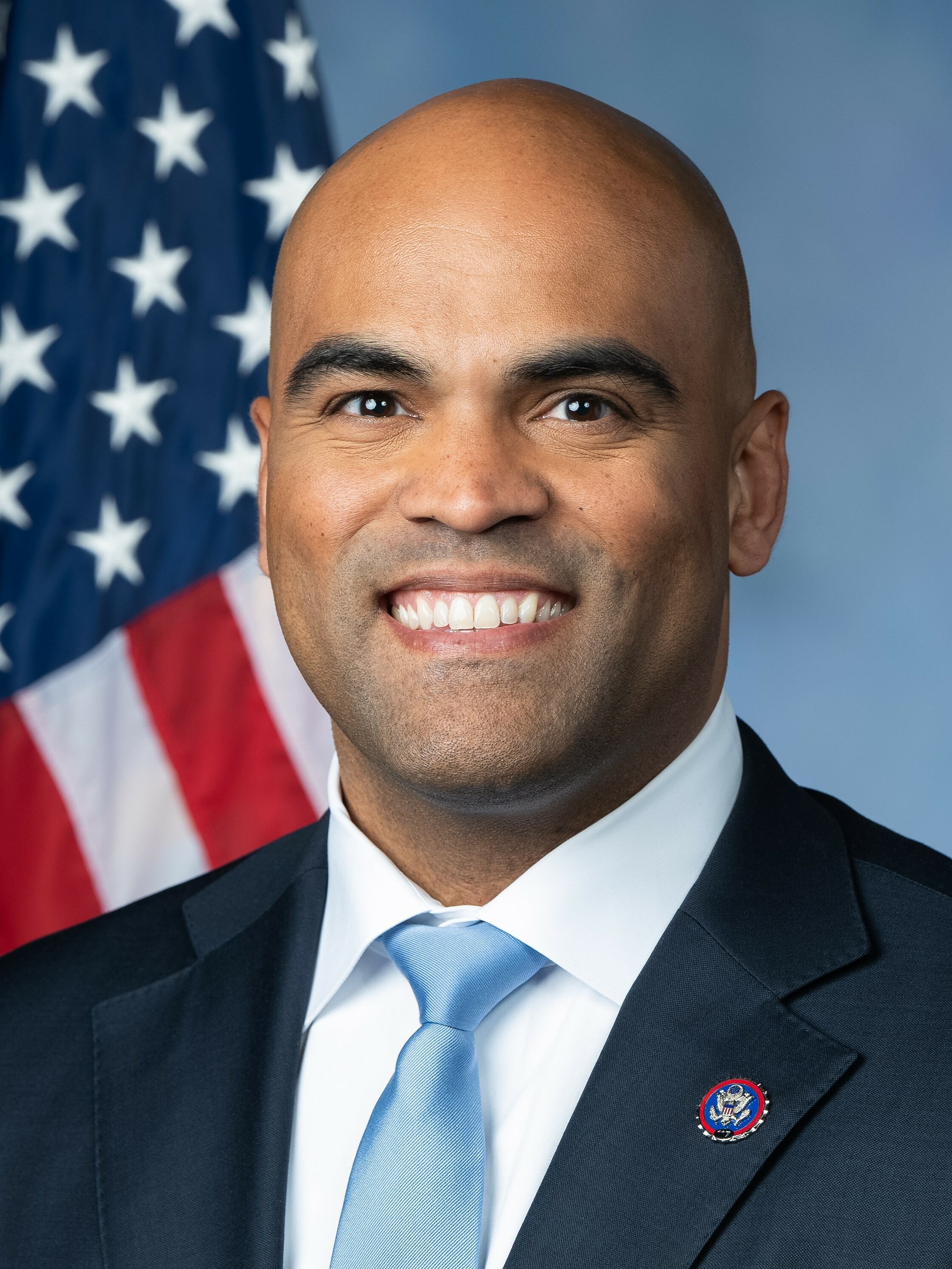

Nominee	Colin Allred	Antonio Swad
Party	Democratic	Republican
Popular vote	116,005	61,494
Percentage	65.36%	34.64%
- Allred: 50–60% 60–70% 70–80% 80–90% ≥90% Swad: 50–60% 80–90% ≥90%
U.S. Representative before election
Colin Allred
Democratic
Elected U.S. Representative
Colin Allred
Democratic

The 32nd district covers northern and eastern Dallas and its inner northern suburbs. The incumbent was Democrat Colin Allred, who was reelected with 51.9% of the vote in 2020.

This district was included on the list of Democratic-held seats the National Republican Congressional Committee was targeting in 2022. However, due to redistricting, the seat became much safer, so it was unlikely that it would be targeted to the same degree.

=== Democratic primary ===
==== Candidates ====
===== Nominee =====
- Colin Allred, incumbent U.S. representative

==== Endorsements ====
Colin Allred

Labor unions

- Texas AFL–CIO
- United Auto Workers

Organizations

- End Citizens United
- Giffords
- NARAL Pro-Choice America
- Pro-Israel America
- Sierra Club
- United States Chamber of Commerce (post-primary)

==== Results ====
Democratic primary results
Party	Candidate	Votes	%
Democratic	Colin Allred (incumbent)	31,805	100.0
Total votes		31,805	100.0

=== Republican primary ===
==== Candidates ====
===== Nominee =====
- Antonio Swad, restaurant chain founder

===== Eliminated in runoff =====
- Justin Webb, financial executive

===== Eliminated in primary =====
- Nathan Davis, consultant
- Darrell Day, businessman
- Brad Namdar, businessman
- E. E. Okpa, realtor and perennial candidate

==== Endorsements ====
Darrell Day

Elected officials

- Stefani Carter, former representative for Texas House of Representatives' 102nd district (2011–2015)
Brad Namdar

Elected officials

- Pete Sessions, incumbent representative for Texas's 17th congressional district (1997–2019; 2021–present)

Organizations

- National Rifle Association-Political Victory Fund
- Republican National Hispanic Assembly
E. E. Okpa

Individuals

- Rick Perry, former governor of Texas (2000–2015), 2012 and 2016 presidential candidate, and former United States Secretary of Energy (2017–2019)

==== Results ====
Republican primary results
Party	Candidate	Votes	%
Republican	Antonio Swad	8,962	40.3
Republican	Justin Webb	4,007	18.0
Republican	Nathan Davis	3,549	16.0
Republican	Darrell Day	2,321	10.4
Republican	Brad Namdar	2,270	10.2
Republican	E. E. Okpa	1,128	5.1
Total votes		22,237	100.0

==== Primary runoff results ====
Republican primary results
Party	Candidate	Votes	%
Republican	Antonio Swad	6,929	57.0
Republican	Justin Webb	5,226	43.0
Total votes		12,155	100.0

=== General election ===
==== Predictions ====
Source	Ranking	As of
The Cook Political Report	Solid D	October 25, 2021
Inside Elections	Solid D	November 15, 2021
Sabato's Crystal Ball	Safe D	November 11, 2021
Politico	Solid D	April 5, 2022
RCP	Safe D	June 9, 2022
Fox News	Solid D	August 22, 2022
DDHQ	Solid D	July 20, 2022
538	Solid D	June 30, 2022
The Economist	Safe D	September 28, 2022

==== Results ====
Texas's 32nd congressional district, 2022
Party	Candidate	Votes	%
Democratic	Colin Allred (incumbent)	116,005	65.36
Republican	Antonio Swad	61,494	34.64
Total votes		177,499	100.0

== District 33 ==
2022 Texas's 33rd congressional district election
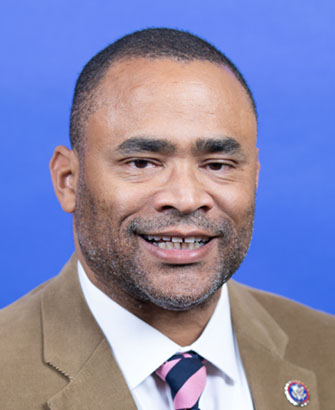

Nominee	Marc Veasey	Patrick Gillespie
Party	Democratic	Republican
Popular vote	82,081	29,203
Percentage	71.98%	25.61%
- Veasey: 40–50% 50–60% 60–70% 70–80% 80–90% ≥90% Gillespie: 50–60% 60–70% 70–80% ≥90% Tie: 40–50% No votes
U.S. Representative before election
Marc Veasey
Democratic
Elected U.S. Representative
Marc Veasey
Democratic

The 33rd district is in the Dallas–Fort Worth metroplex, encompassing Downtown Fort Worth, western Dallas, and parts of Grand Prairie, Irving, Carrollton, and Farmers Branch. The incumbent was Democrat Marc Veasey, who was reelected with 66.8% of the vote in 2018.

=== Democratic primary ===
==== Candidates ====
===== Nominee =====
- Marc Veasey, incumbent U.S. representative

===== Eliminated in primary =====
- Carlos Quintanilla, businessman

==== Endorsements ====
Marc Veasey

Labor unions

- Texas AFL–CIO
- United Auto Workers

Organizations

- Sierra Club

==== Results ====
Democratic primary results
Party	Candidate	Votes	%
Democratic	Marc Veasey (incumbent)	16,806	69.5
Democratic	Carlos Quintanilla	7,373	30.5
Total votes		24,179	100.0

=== Republican primary ===
==== Candidates ====
===== Nominee =====
- Patrick Gillespie, writer

===== Eliminated in primary =====
- Robert Glafin, business consultant

==== Results ====
Republican primary results
Party	Candidate	Votes	%
Republican	Patrick Gillespie	5,709	63.5
Republican	Robert Glafin	3,284	36.5
Total votes		8,993	100.0

=== General election ===
==== Predictions ====
Source	Ranking	As of
The Cook Political Report	Solid D	October 25, 2021
Inside Elections	Solid D	November 15, 2021
Sabato's Crystal Ball	Safe D	November 11, 2021
Politico	Solid D	April 5, 2022
RCP	Safe D	June 9, 2022
Fox News	Solid D	July 11, 2022
DDHQ	Solid D	July 20, 2022
538	Solid D	June 30, 2022
The Economist	Safe D	September 28, 2022

==== Results ====
Texas's 33rd congressional district, 2022
Party	Candidate	Votes	%
Democratic	Marc Veasey (incumbent)	82,081	71.98
Republican	Patrick Gillespie	29,203	25.61
Libertarian	Ken Ashby	2,746	2.41
Total votes		114,030	100.0

== District 34 ==
2022 Texas's 34th congressional district election
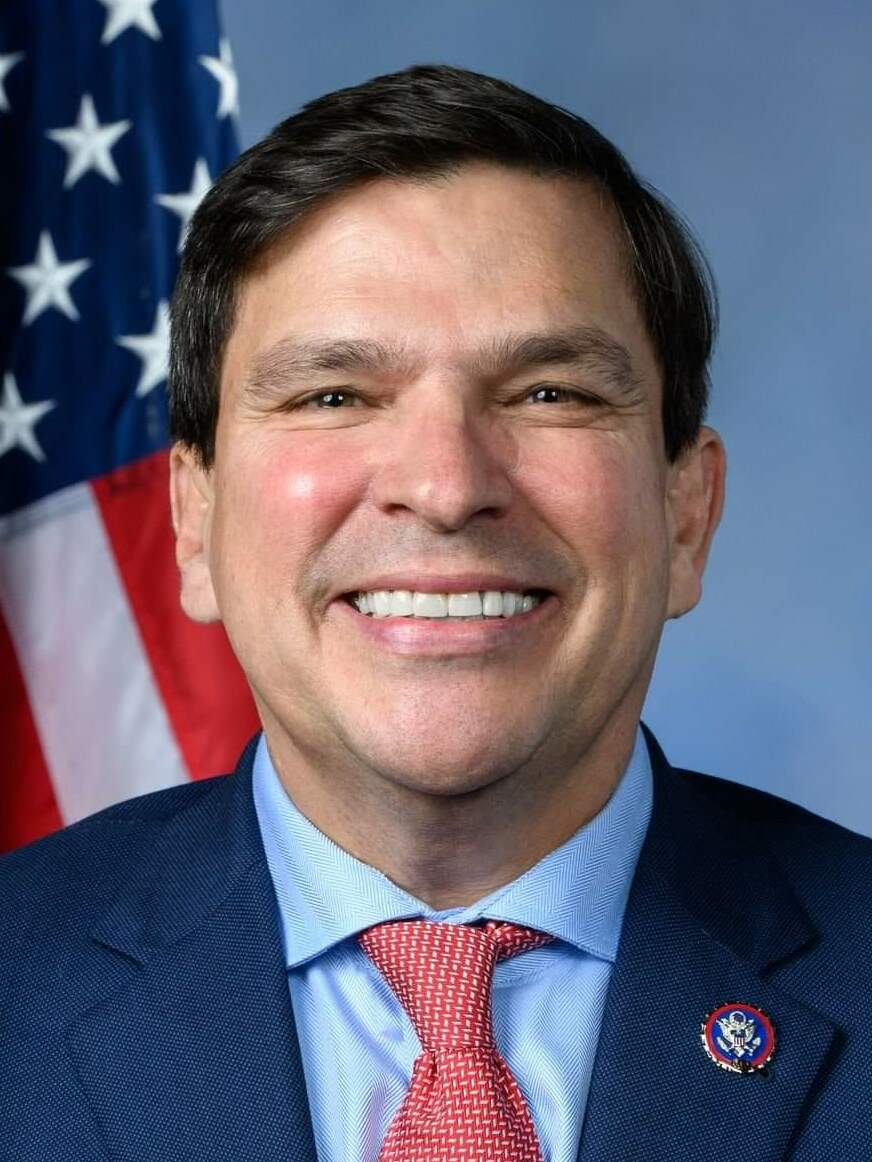

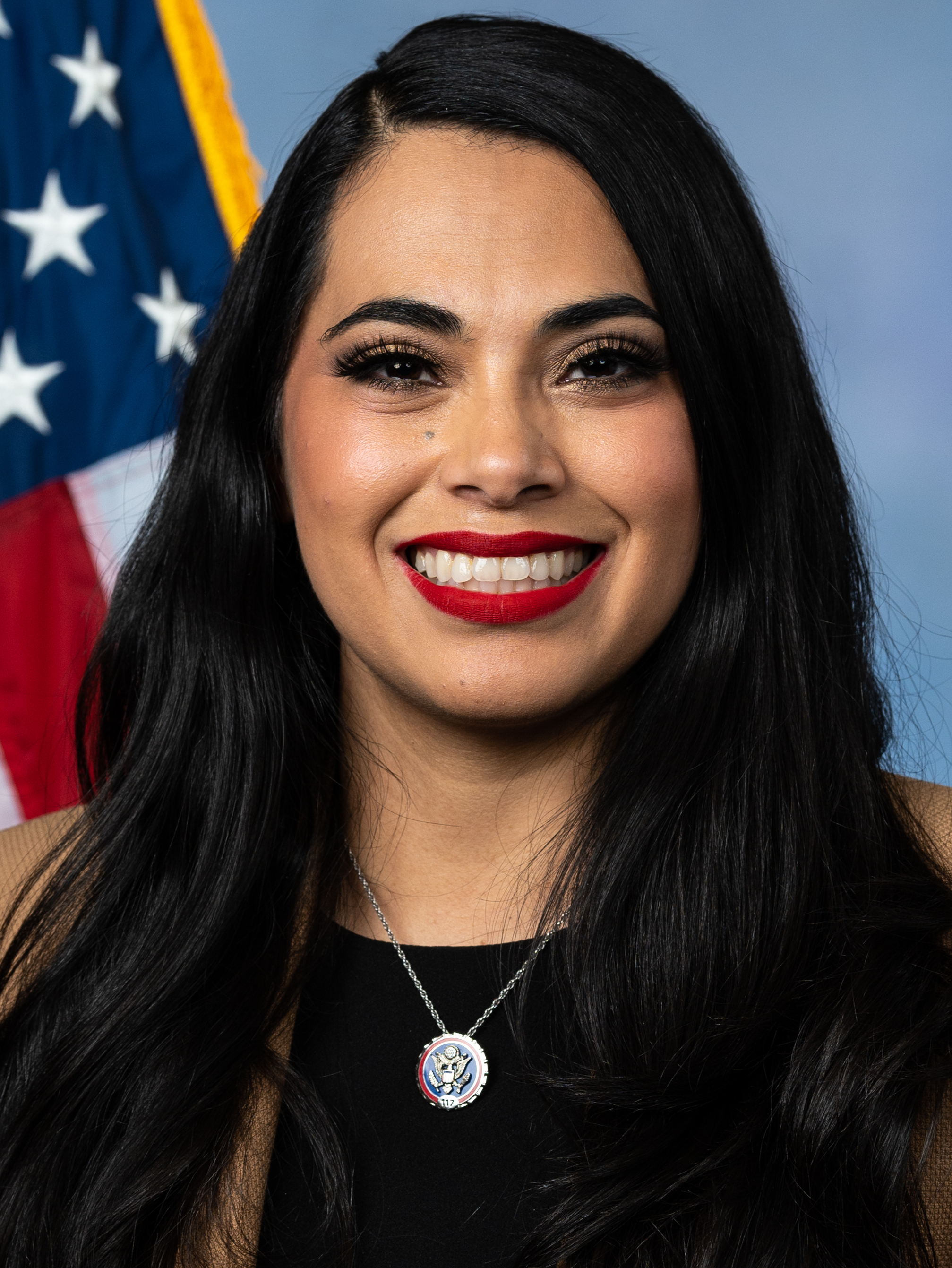
Nominee	Vicente Gonzalez	Mayra Flores
Party	Democratic	Republican
Popular vote	70,896	59,464
Percentage	52.73%	44.23%
- County results Gonzalez: 50–60% Flores: 50–60% 70–80%
U.S. Representative before election
Mayra Flores (Republican)
Vicente Gonzalez (Democratic)
Elected U.S. Representative
Vicente Gonzalez
Democratic

The 34th district stretches from McAllen and Brownsville in the Rio Grande Valley, northward along the Gulf Coast. The incumbent was Republican Mayra Flores, who was first elected with 50.9% of the vote in 2022. On March 22, 2021, former incumbent Filemon Vela announced that he would not seek reelection in 2022. On October 26, 2021, Vicente Gonzalez, the representative for Texas's 15th congressional district, announced that he intended to run in the new 34th district after the 15th became more Republican and his residence was put into the 34th.

=== Republican primary ===
==== Candidates ====
===== Nominee =====
- Mayra Flores, respiratory care practitioner and Hidalgo County GOP Hispanic outreach chair

===== Eliminated in primary =====
- Juana Cantu-Cabrera, nurse practitioner
- Gregory Kunkle, musician
- Frank McCaffrey, former broadcast journalist

==== Results ====
Republican primary results
Party	Candidate	Votes	%
Republican	Mayra Flores	9,490	60.4
Republican	Frank McCaffrey	3,444	21.9
Republican	Gregory Kunkle	1,677	10.7
Republican	Juana Cantu-Cabrera	1,115	7.1
Total votes		15,726	100.0

=== Democratic primary ===
==== Candidates ====
===== Nominee =====
- Vicente Gonzalez, incumbent representative for Texas's 15th congressional district

===== Eliminated in primary =====
- Laura Cisneros, oncologist
- Filemon Meza, teacher
- Beatriz Reynoso, graphic designer
- Osbert Rodriguez Haro, farmer
- William Thompson, investor
- Diego Zavala, vice principal

===== Withdrawn =====
- Rochelle Mercedes Garza, attorney (running for attorney general)

===== Declined =====
- Alex Dominguez, state representative from the 37th district
- Filemon Vela, former U.S. representative (endorsed Gonzalez)

==== Endorsements ====
Vicente Gonzalez

U.S. representatives

- Filemon Vela, U.S. representative from TX-34 (2013–2022)

Labor unions

- Texas AFL–CIO
- United Auto Workers

Organizations

- Pro-Israel America
Mayra Flores

Executive branch officials

- Donald Trump, 45th president of the United States (2017–2021)

Texas officials

- Greg Abbott, governor of Texas

US senators

- Ted Cruz, US senator from Texas

==== Results ====
Democratic primary results
Party	Candidate	Votes	%
Democratic	Vicente Gonzalez (incumbent)	23,531	64.8
Democratic	Laura Cisneros	8,456	23.3
Democratic	Beatriz Reynoso	1,287	3.5
Democratic	William Thompson	1,085	3.0
Democratic	Filemon Meza	920	2.5
Democratic	Diego Zavala	718	2.0
Democratic	Osbert Rodriguez Haro	331	0.9
Total votes		36,328	100.0

=== General election ===
==== Predictions ====
Source	Ranking	As of
The Cook Political Report	Tossup	October 5, 2022
Inside Elections	Tossup	November 3, 2022
Sabato's Crystal Ball	Lean R	November 7, 2022
Politico	Tossup	October 3, 2022
RCP	Tossup	October 3, 2022
Fox News	Tossup	October 11, 2022
DDHQ	Tossup	October 17, 2022
538	Tossup	October 25, 2022
The Economist	Lean D (flip)	November 1, 2022

==== Polling ====
Poll source	Date(s) administered	Sample size	Margin of error	Mayra Flores (R)	Vicente Gonzalez (D)	Other	Undecided
RMG Research	July 23 – August 1, 2022	400 (LV)	± 4.9%	43%	47%	3%	8%

==== Results ====
Texas's 34th congressional district, 2022
Party	Candidate	Votes	%
Democratic	Vicente Gonzalez (incumbent)	70,896	52.73
Republican	Mayra Flores (incumbent)	59,464	44.23
Independent	Chris Royal	4,079	3.03
Total votes		134,439	100.0

== District 35 ==
2022 Texas's 35th congressional district election
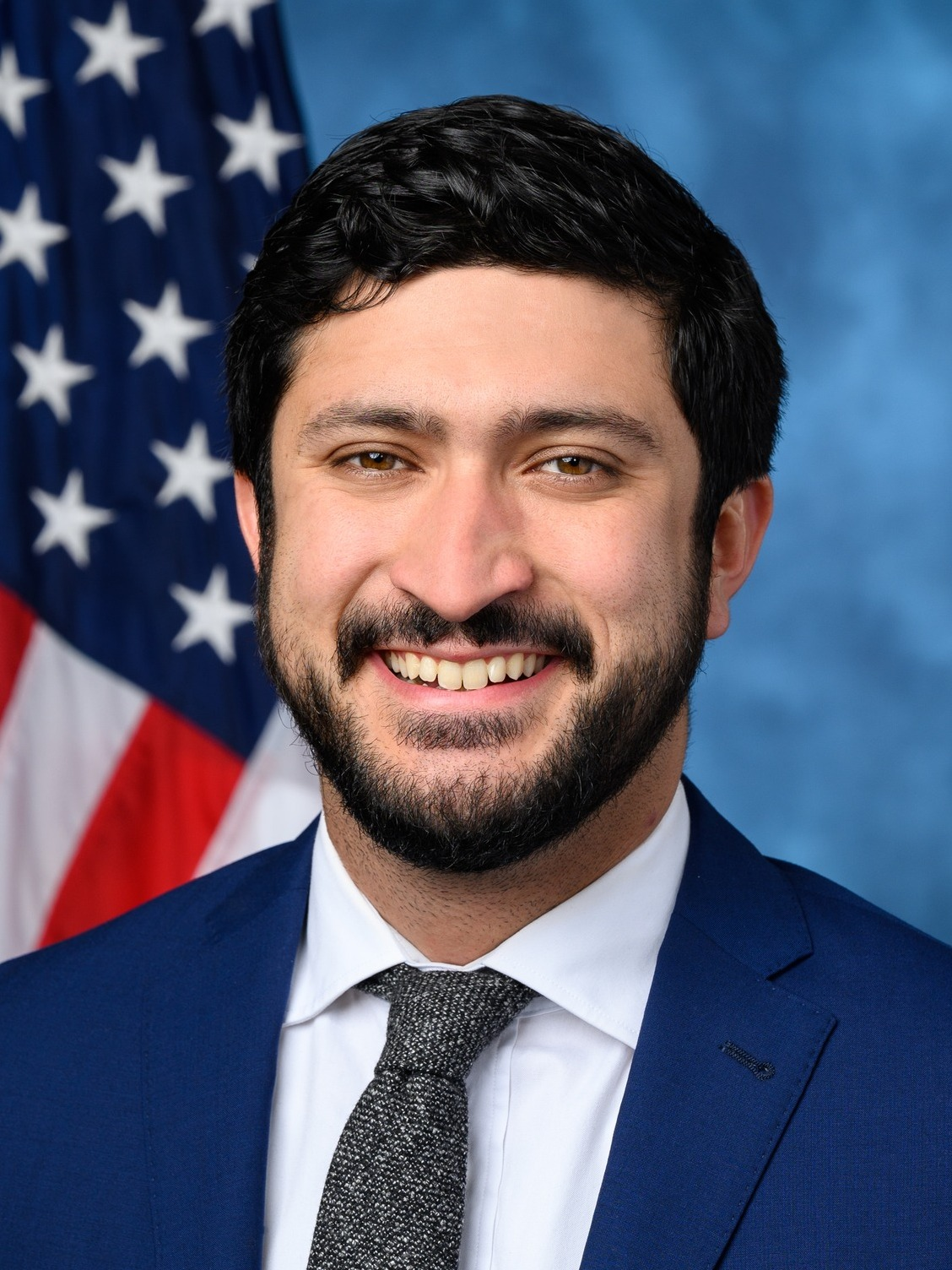

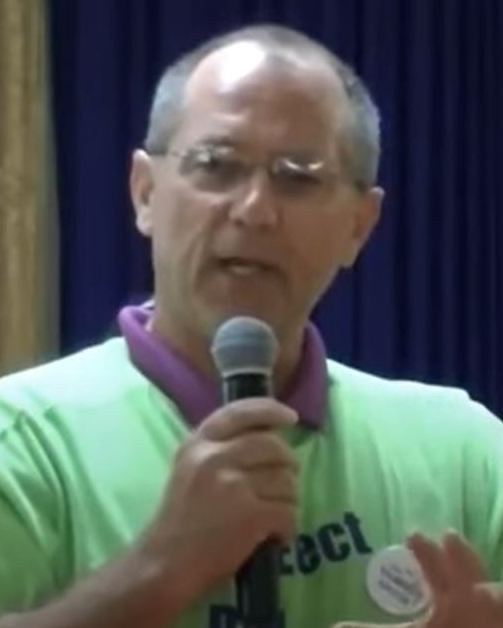
Nominee	Greg Casar	Dan McQueen
Party	Democratic	Republican
Popular vote	129,599	48,969
Percentage	72.58%	27.42%
- County results Casar: 60–70% 80–90% McQueen: 60–70%
U.S. Representative before election
Lloyd Doggett
Democratic
Elected U.S. Representative
Greg Casar
Democratic

The 35th district connects eastern San Antonio to southeastern Austin, through the I-35 corridor. The incumbent was Democrat Lloyd Doggett, who was reelected with 65.4% of the vote in 2020. On October 18, 2021, Doggett announced that he would run for reelection in the new 37th district, leaving the 35th open.

=== Democratic primary ===
==== Candidates ====
===== Nominee =====
- Greg Casar, Austin City Councilmember for District 4 (2015–present)

===== Eliminated in primary =====
- Eddie Rodriguez, state representative for District 51 (2003–present)
- Carla-Joy Sisco, pastor and consultant
- Rebecca Viagran, former San Antonio city councilmember

===== Withdrew =====
- David Anderson Jr., nonprofit executive (running in Texas's 21st congressional district)
- Claudia Zapata, community activist (running in Texas's 21st congressional district)

===== Declined =====
- Lloyd Doggett, incumbent U.S. representative (running in Texas's 37th congressional district)

==== Endorsements ====
Greg Casar

U.S. senators

- Bernie Sanders, U.S. senator from Vermont (2007–present)
- Elizabeth Warren, U.S. senator from Massachusetts (2013–present)

U.S. representatives

- Jamaal Bowman, U.S. representative for NY-16 (2021–present)
- Sylvia Garcia, U.S. representative for TX-29 (2019–present)
- Sheila Jackson Lee, U.S. representative for TX-18 (1995–present)
- Pramila Jayapal, U.S. representative for WA-07; Chair of the Congressional Progressive Caucus
- Eddie Bernice Johnson, U.S. representative for TX-30
- Mondaire Jones, U.S. representative for NY-17 (2021–present)
- Alexandria Ocasio-Cortez, U.S. representative for NY-14 (2019–present)
- Mark Pocan, U.S. representative for WI-02
- Jamie Raskin, U.S. representative for MD-08

State legislators

- Wendy Davis, former state senator (2009–2015), Democratic nominee in 2014 Texas gubernatorial election and Texas's 21st congressional district in 2020
- José R. Rodríguez, former state senator (2011–2021)

Municipal officials

- Steve Adler, mayor of Austin (2015–present)
- José Garza, district attorney of Travis County (2021–present)
- Ann Kitchen, Austin City Councilmember for 5th District (2015–present) and former state representative (2001-2003)
- Brad Lander, New York City Comptroller (2022–present)

Individuals

- Rana Abdelhamid, activist
- Martha P. Cotera, author and activist

Labor unions

- Communications Workers of America District 6
- Laborers' International Union of North America Local 1095
- Texas AFL–CIO
- UNITE HERE Local 23
- United Auto Workers

Organizations

- Austin Democratic Socialists of America
- Brand New Congress
- Congressional Progressive Caucus PAC
- Democracy for America
- End Citizens United
- Indivisible
- Justice Democrats
- Latino Victory Fund
- League of Conservation Voters Action Fund
- NARAL Pro-Choice America
- Our Revolution
- Progressive Democrats of America
- Sierra Club
- Sunrise Movement
- Working Families Party

Newspapers and other media

- The Austin Chronicle (Democratic primary only)
- San Antonio Express-News (Democratic primary only)
Eddie Rodriguez

Federal officials

- Al Green, U.S. representative from TX-09
- Marc Veasey, U.S. representative from TX-33
- Filemon Vela, U.S. representative from TX-34

State legislators

- Sheryl Cole, state representative for District 46 (2019–present)
- Philip Cortez, state representative for District 117 (2013-2015, 2017–present)
- Barbara Gervin-Hawkins, state representative for District 120 (2017–present)
- Vikki Goodwin, state representative for District 47 (2019–present)
- Gina Hinojosa, state representative for District 49 (2017–present)
- Donna Howard, state representative for District 48 (2006–present)
- Celia Israel, state representative for District 50 (2014–present)
- Ray Lopez, state representative for District 125 (2019–present)
- Trey Martinez Fischer, state representative for District 116 (2001–2017; 2019–present)

Organizations

- New Democrat Coalition

Newspapers and other media

- Austin American-Statesman (Democratic primary only)
Rebecca Viagran

Executive officials

- Henry Cisneros, former Secretary of Housing and Urban Development; former mayor of San Antonio

State officials

- Jose Menendez, state senator for District 26
- Leticia Van de Putte, former state senator for District 26

Local officials

- Nelson Wolff, former mayor of San Antonio

==== Polling ====
Poll source	Date(s) administered	Sample size	Margin of error	Greg Casar	Eddie Rodriguez	Carla-Joy Sisco	Rebecca Viagran	Undecided
Public Policy Polling (D) (Note: This poll was sponsored by the Working Families Party and the Justice Democrats, both of which endorsed Casar.)	February 18–19, 2022	520 (LV)	± 4.3%	42%	13%	2%	9%	33%
Lake Research Partners (D) (Note: This poll was sponsored by Casar's campaign.)	January 2022	– (LV)	–	48%	20%	–	14%	–
Lake Research Partners (D)	Early November 2021	400 (LV) (Note: After weighting (regional oversample of 50 voters in targeted precincts in Hays County))	± 4.9%	25%	13%	–	–	–

==== Results ====
Democratic primary results
Party	Candidate	Votes	%
Democratic	Greg Casar	25,505	61.1
Democratic	Eddie Rodriguez	6,526	15.6
Democratic	Rebecca Viagran	6,511	15.6
Democratic	Carla-Joy Sisco	3,190	7.6
Total votes		41,732	100.0

=== Republican primary ===
==== Candidates ====
===== Nominee =====
- Dan McQueen, former mayor of Corpus Christi and withdrawn candidate for U.S. Senate of Missouri in 2022

===== Eliminated in runoff =====
- Michael Rogriguez, household manager

===== Eliminated in primary =====
- Jenai Aragona, realtor
- Bill Condict, program scheduler
- Marilyn Jackson, insurance agent
- Alejandro Ledezma, construction laborer
- Sam Montoya, reporter
- Asa Palagi, entrepreneur
- Dan Sawatzki, U.S. Air Force veteran
- Jennifer Sundt, attorney

===== Results =====
Republican primary results
Party	Candidate	Votes	%
Republican	Dan McQueen	2,900	21.3
Republican	Michael Rodriguez	2,034	14.9
Republican	Bill Condict	1,529	11.2
Republican	Marilyn Jackson	1,473	10.8
Republican	Dan Sawatzki	1,414	10.4
Republican	Jennifer Sundt	1,299	9.5
Republican	Sam Montoya	1,227	9.0
Republican	Alejandro Ledezma	833	6.1
Republican	Jenai Aragona	589	4.3
Republican	Asa Palagi	327	2.4
Total votes		13,625	100.0

==== Primary runoff results ====
Republican primary runoff results
Party	Candidate	Votes	%
Republican	Dan McQueen	4,161	61.3
Republican	Michael Rodriguez	2,632	38.7
Total votes		6,793	100.0

=== General election ===
==== Predictions ====
Source	Ranking	As of
The Cook Political Report	Solid D	October 25, 2021
Inside Elections	Solid D	November 15, 2021
Sabato's Crystal Ball	Safe D	November 11, 2021
Politico	Solid D	April 5, 2022
RCP	Safe D	June 9, 2022
Fox News	Solid D	July 11, 2022
DDHQ	Solid D	July 20, 2022
538	Solid D	June 30, 2022
The Economist	Safe D	September 28, 2022

==== Results ====
Texas's 35th congressional district, 2022
Party	Candidate	Votes	%
Democratic	Greg Casar	129,599	72.58
Republican	Dan McQueen	48,969	27.42
Total votes		178,568	100.0

== District 36 ==
2022 Texas's 36th congressional district election
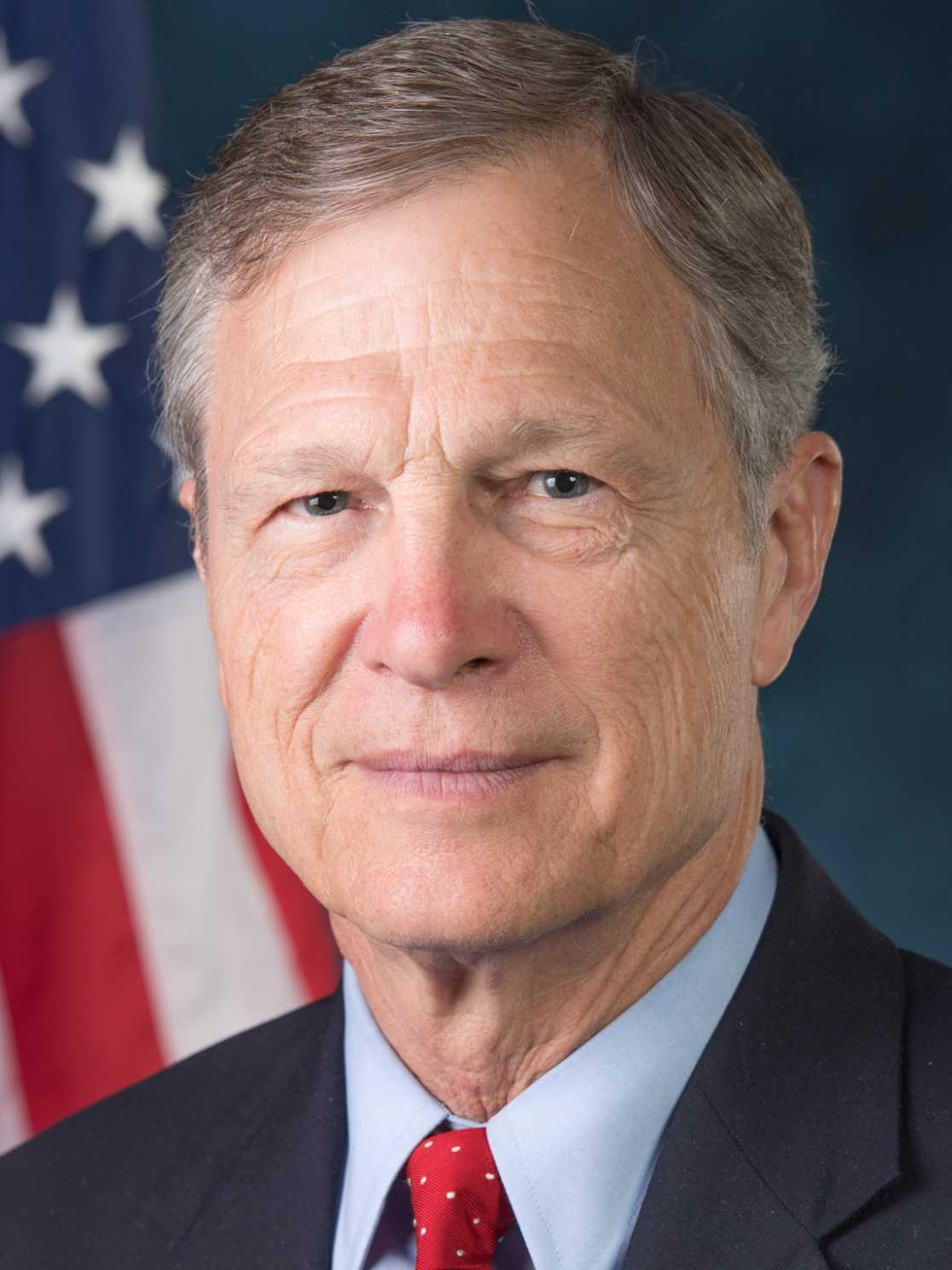

Nominee	Brian Babin	Jon Haire
Party	Republican	Democratic
Popular vote	145,599	64,016
Percentage	69.46%	30.54%
- Babin: 50–60% 60–70% 70–80% 80–90% >90% Haire: 50–60% 60–70% 70–80% 80–90% >90% No votes
U.S. Representative before election
Brian Babin
Republican
Elected U.S. Representative
Brian Babin
Republican

The 36th district encompasses parts of Southeast Texas, including the Clear Lake region. The incumbent was Republican Brian Babin, who was reelected with 73.6% of the vote in 2020.

=== Republican primary ===
==== Candidates ====
===== Nominee =====
- Brian Babin, incumbent U.S. representative

==== Endorsements ====
Brian Babin

Executive branch officials

- Donald Trump, 45th president of the United States (2017–2021)

==== Results ====
Republican primary results
Party	Candidate	Votes	%
Republican	Brian Babin (incumbent)	59,381	100.0
Total votes		59,381	100.0

=== Democratic primary ===
==== Candidates ====
===== Nominee =====
- Marvin Jonathan "Jon" Haire, scientist

==== Results ====
Democratic primary results
Party	Candidate	Votes	%
Democratic	Jon Haire	16,589	100.0
Total votes		16,589	100.0

=== General election ===
==== Predictions ====
Source	Ranking	As of
The Cook Political Report	Solid R	October 25, 2021
Inside Elections	Solid R	November 15, 2021
Sabato's Crystal Ball	Safe R	November 11, 2021
Politico	Solid R	April 5, 2022
RCP	Safe R	June 9, 2022
Fox News	Solid R	July 11, 2022
DDHQ	Solid R	July 20, 2022
538	Solid R	June 30, 2022
The Economist	Safe R	September 28, 2022

==== Results ====
Texas's 36th congressional district, 2022
Party	Candidate	Votes	%
Republican	Brian Babin (incumbent)	145,599	69.46
Democratic	Jon Haire	64,016	30.54
Total votes		209,615	100.0

== District 37 ==
2022 Texas's 37th congressional district election
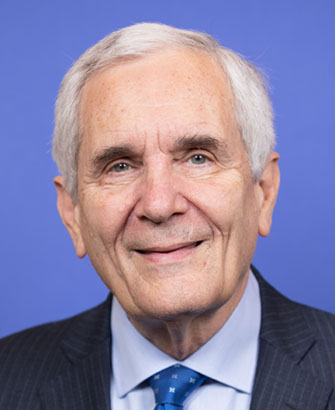

Nominee	Lloyd Doggett	Jenny Sharon
Party	Democratic	Republican
Popular vote	219,358	59,923
Percentage	76.76%	20.97%
- Doggett: 50–60% 60–70% 70–80% 80–90% ≥90% Sharon: 50–60%
U.S. Representative before election
None
(New district)
Elected U.S. Representative
Lloyd Doggett
Democratic

The new 37th congressional district is centered on Austin. Incumbent Democrat Lloyd Doggett, who previously represented the 35th district, will run here. He was reelected with 65.4% of the vote in 2020.

=== Democratic primary ===
==== Candidates ====
===== Nominee =====
- Lloyd Doggett, incumbent representative

===== Eliminated in primary =====
- Quinton Beaubouef, graduate student
- Donna Imam, computer engineer and nominee for Texas's 31st congressional district in 2020
- Chris Jones, traffic camera company director

===== Declined =====
- Julie Oliver, Democratic nominee for TX-25 in 2018 and 2020

==== Endorsements ====
Lloyd Doggett

Federal officials

- Nancy Pelosi, speaker of the United States House of Representatives
- Elizabeth Warren, U.S. senator from Massachusetts

State legislators

- Sarah Eckhardt, state senator from District 14 (2020–present) and former county judge of Travis County (2015–2020)

Municipal officials

- Steve Adler, mayor of Austin (2015–present)

Labor unions

- Texas AFL–CIO
- United Auto Workers

Organizations

- Progressive Democrats of America
- Sierra Club
- Texas College Democrats

Newspapers and other media

- The Austin Chronicle

==== Results ====
Democratic primary results
Party	Candidate	Votes	%
Democratic	Lloyd Doggett (incumbent)	60,007	79.3
Democratic	Donna Imam	13,385	17.7
Democratic	Chris Jones	1,503	2.0
Democratic	Quinton Beaubouef	804	1.1
Total votes		75,699	100.0

=== Republican primary ===
==== Candidates ====
===== Nominee =====
- Jenny Sharon, caregiver

===== Eliminated in runoff =====
- Rod Lingsch, pilot

===== Eliminated in primary =====
- Jeremiah Diacogiannis, business manager

==== Results ====
Republican primary results
Party	Candidate	Votes	%
Republican	Jenny Sharon	9,087	46.8
Republican	Rod Lingsch	5,403	27.8
Republican	Jeremiah Diacogiannis	4,938	25.4
Total votes		19,428	100.0

==== Primary runoff results ====
Republican primary results
Party	Candidate	Votes	%
Republican	Jenny Sharon	6,923	59.1
Republican	Rod Lingsch	4,791	40.9
Total votes		11,714	100.0

=== General election ===
==== Predictions ====
Source	Ranking	As of
The Cook Political Report	Solid D	October 25, 2021
Inside Elections	Solid D	November 15, 2021
Sabato's Crystal Ball	Safe D	November 11, 2021
Politico	Solid D	April 5, 2022
RCP	Safe D	June 9, 2022
Fox News	Solid D	July 11, 2022
DDHQ	Solid D	July 20, 2022
538	Solid D	June 30, 2022
The Economist	Safe D	September 28, 2022

==== Results ====
Texas's 37th congressional district, 2022
Party	Candidate	Votes	%
Democratic	Lloyd Doggett (incumbent)	219,358	76.76
Republican	Jenny Sharon	59,923	20.97
Libertarian	Clark Patterson	6,332	2.22
Write-in	Sherri Taylor	176	0.06
Total votes		285,789	100.0

== District 38 ==
2022 Texas's 38th congressional district election
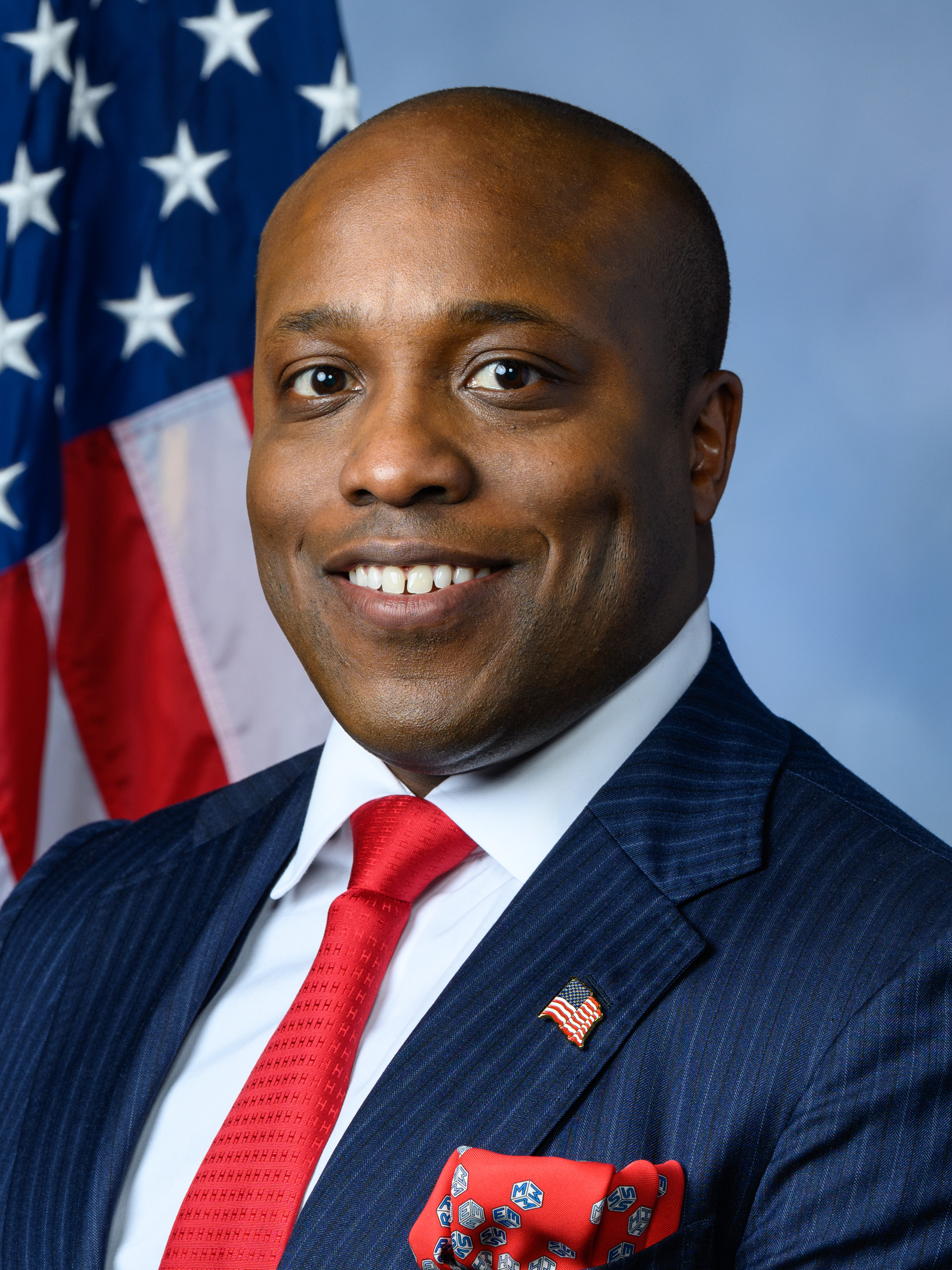

Nominee	Wesley Hunt	Duncan Klussmann
Party	Republican	Democratic
Popular vote	163,597	92,302
Percentage	62.95%	35.52%
- Hunt: 40–50% 50–60% 60–70% 70–80% 80–90% ≥90% Klussmann: 40–50% 50–60% 60–70% ≥90% Tie: 40–50%
U.S. Representative before election
(new seat)
Elected U.S. Representative
Wesley Hunt
Republican

The new 38th district is based in the north and northwest Harris County Houston suburbs such as Jersey Village, Cypress, Tomball, Katy, and Klein. This was a new district; there was no incumbent.

=== Republican primary ===
==== Candidates ====
===== Nominee =====
- Wesley Hunt, U.S. Army veteran and nominee for Texas's 7th congressional district in 2020

===== Eliminated in primary =====
- Philip Covarrubias, former Colorado state representative
- Alex Cross, IT consultant
- Jerry Ford Sr., fire chief and business owner
- Brett Guillory, educator
- David Hogan, minister
- Roland Lopez, business consultant
- Damien Mockus, small businesses owner
- Mark Ramsey, consulting engineer and Texas SREC District 7 representative
- Richard Welch, project manager (previously filed to run in Texas's 7th congressional district)

===== Declined =====
- Dan Crenshaw, incumbent U.S. representative (running for reelection in Texas's 2nd congressional district)

==== Polling ====
Poll source	Date(s) administered	Sample size	Margin of error	Phil Covarrubias	John Cross	Jerry Ford Sr.	Brett Guillory	Wesley Hunt	Roland Lopez	Damien Mockus	Mark Ramsey	Richard Welch	Undecided
Moore Information Group (R) (Note: This poll was sponsored by Hunt's campaign.)	January 24–25, 2022	400 (LV)	± 4.9%	<1%	1%	2%	1%	54%	2%	1%	3%	<1%	36%

=== Endorsements ===
Wesley Hunt

Executive branch officials

- Donald Trump, 45th president of the United States (2017–2021)

Organizations

- Congressional Leadership Fund
- Republican Jewish Coalition PAC
- SEAL PAC
Ronald Lopez

Federal officials

- Paul Gosar, U.S. representative from AZ-04
Mark Ramsey

State officials

- Wayne Christian, member of the Texas Railroad Commission
- Sid Miller, Texas Agriculture Commissioner

==== Results ====
Republican primary results
Party	Candidate	Votes	%
Republican	Wesley Hunt	35,291	55.3
Republican	Mark Ramsey	19,352	30.3
Republican	David Hogan	3,125	4.9
Republican	Ronald Lopez	2,048	3.2
Republican	Brett Guillroy	1,416	2.2
Republican	Jerry Ford, Sr.	997	1.6
Republican	Richard Welch	633	1.0
Republican	Alex Cross	460	0.7
Republican	Damien Mockus	249	0.4
Republican	Philip Covarrubias	228	0.4
Total votes		63,799	100.0

=== Democratic primary ===
==== Candidates ====
===== Nominee =====
- Duncan Klussmann, consultant and former Spring Branch Independent School District superintendent

===== Eliminated in runoff =====
- Diana Martinez Alexander, educator

===== Eliminated in primary =====
- Centrell Reed, media company owner

==== Results ====
Democratic primary results
Party	Candidate	Votes	%
Democratic	Diana Martinez Alexander	9,861	44.6
Democratic	Duncan Klussmann	8,698	39.3
Democratic	Centrell Reed	3,550	16.1
Total votes		22,109	100.0

==== Primary runoff results ====
Democratic primary results
Party	Candidate	Votes	%
Democratic	Duncan Klussmann	6,449	61.1
Democratic	Diana Martinez Alexander	4,111	38.9
Total votes		10,560	100.0

=== Independent ===
==== Declared ====
- Joel Dejean, former electronics design engineer

=== General election ===
==== Predictions ====
Source	Ranking	As of
The Cook Political Report	Solid R	October 25, 2021
Inside Elections	Solid R	November 15, 2021
Sabato's Crystal Ball	Safe R	November 11, 2021
Politico	Solid R	April 5, 2022
RCP	Safe R	June 9, 2022
Fox News	Solid R	July 11, 2022
DDHQ	Solid R	July 20, 2022
538	Solid R	June 30, 2022
The Economist	Safe R	September 28, 2022

==== Results ====
Texas's 38th congressional district, 2022
Party	Candidate	Votes	%
Republican	Wesley Hunt	163,597	62.95
Democratic	Duncan Klussmann	92,302	35.52
Independent	Joel Dejean	3,970	1.53
Total votes		259,869	100.0

== See also ==
- Elections in Texas
- Politics of Texas
  - Political party strength in Texas
  - Texas Democratic Party
  - Republican Party of Texas
- Government of Texas
- 2022 United States House of Representatives elections
- 2022 Texas gubernatorial election
- 2022 Texas State Senate election
- 2022 Texas House of Representatives election
- 2022 Texas elections

== Notes ==
Partisan clients
