= 2022 United States House of Representatives election ratings =

Predictions for select races in the 2022 House elections

The 2022 United States House of Representatives elections were held November 8, 2022, to elect representatives from all 435 congressional districts across each of the 50 U.S. states. Five of the six non-voting delegates from the District of Columbia and the inhabited U.S. territories were also elected (Puerto Rico's delegate, the Resident Commissioner, serves four year terms and was last elected in 2020). Numerous federal, state, and local elections, including the 2022 U.S. Senate elections, were also held on this date.

== Election ratings ==
=== Latest published ratings for competitive seats ===
Several sites and individuals publish ratings of competitive seats. The seats listed below are considered competitive (not "safe" or "solid") by at least one of the rating groups. These ratings are based upon factors such as the strength of the incumbent (if the incumbent is running for re-election), the strength of the candidates, and the partisan history of the district (the Cook Partisan Voting Index (CPVI) is one example of this metric). Each rating describes the likelihood of a given outcome in the election.

Most election ratings use:

- Tossup: no advantage
- Tilt (sometimes used): very slight advantage
- Lean: significant, but not overwhelming advantage
- Likely: strong, but not certain advantage
- Safe or Solid: outcome is nearly certain

District	CPVI	Incumbent	Last result	Cook Nov 7, 2022	IE Nov 3, 2022	Sabato Nov 7, 2022	Politico Oct 27, 2022	RCP Nov 6, 2022	Fox Oct 21, 2022	DDHQ Oct 27, 2022	538 (Note: FiveThirtyEight has three separate models for their House and Senate ratings: Lite (polling data only), Classic (polls, fundraising, and past voting patterns), and Deluxe (Classic alongside experts' ratings). This table uses the Classic model.) (Note: Category ranges: Tossup: <60% both candidates; Lean: ≥60%; Likely: ≥75%; Solid: ≥95%) Nov 8, 2022	Econ. (Note: The Economist runs 10,000 simulations daily to determine their forecast ratings, which are based on statistical probability.) (Note: Category ranges: Tossup ("Uncertain"): <65% both parties; Lean ("Likely"): 60-85%; Likely ("Very Likely"): 85-99%; Safe: ≥99%) Nov 4, 2022	Winner
Alaska at-large	R+8	Mary Peltola	51.5% D	Lean D	Lean D	Lean D	Lean D	Tossup	Tossup	Tossup	Tossup	Lean D	Mary Peltola (D)
Arizona 1	R+2	David Schweikert	52.2% R	Tossup	Lean R	Lean R	Lean R	Lean R	Lean R	Likely R	Solid R	Lean R	David Schweikert (R)
Arizona 2	R+6	Tom O'Halleran	51.6% D	Lean R (flip)	Lean R (flip)	Lean R (flip)	Lean R (flip)	Likely R (flip)	Lean R (flip)	Lean R (flip)	Lean R (flip)	Lean R (flip)	Eli Crane (R)
Arizona 4	D+2	Greg Stanton	61.6% D	Likely D	Likely D	Lean D	Lean D	Tossup	Tossup	Likely D	Likely D	Likely D	Greg Stanton (D)
Arizona 6	R+3	Ann Kirkpatrick (retiring)	55.1% D	Lean R (flip)	Tilt R (flip)	Lean R (flip)	Lean R (flip)	Lean R (flip)	Lean R (flip)	Likely R (flip)	Likely R (flip)	Lean R (flip)	Juan Ciscomani (R)
California 3	R+4	New seat	–	Likely R (flip)	Likely R (flip)	Likely R (flip)	Lean R (flip)	Likely R (flip)	Likely R (flip)	Likely R (flip)	Solid R (flip)	Likely R (flip)	Kevin Kiley (R)
California 6	D+7	Ami Bera	56.6% D	Solid D	Solid D	Safe D	Solid D	Likely D	Solid D	Solid D	Solid D	Likely D	Ami Bera (D)
California 9	D+5	Josh Harder	55.2% D	Lean D	Likely D	Lean D	Lean D	Tossup	Lean D	Likely D	Likely D	Likely D	Josh Harder (D)
California 13	D+4	New seat	–	Tossup	Tossup	Lean R (flip)	Tossup	Tossup	Tossup	Tossup	Lean D	Lean D	John Duarte (R)
California 21	D+9	Jim Costa	59.4% D	Solid D	Solid D	Safe D	Solid D	Likely D	Solid D	Solid D	Solid D	Likely D	Jim Costa (D)
California 22	D+5	David Valadao	50.4% R	Tossup	Tossup	Lean R	Tossup	Tossup	Tossup	Lean R	Lean R	Tossup	David Valadao (R)
California 23	R+8	Jay Obernolte	56.1% R	Solid R	Solid R	Safe R	Likely R	Safe R	Solid R	Solid R	Solid R	Safe R	Jay Obernolte (R)
California 25	D+6	Raul Ruiz	60.3% D	Solid D	Solid D	Likely D	Likely D	Lean D	Likely D	Solid D	Solid D	Likely D	Raul Ruiz (D)
California 26	D+8	Julia Brownley	60.6% D	Lean D	Likely D	Likely D	Likely D	Lean D	Likely D	Likely D	Solid D	Likely D	Julia Brownley (D)
California 27	D+4	Mike Garcia	50.0% R	Tossup	Tilt R	Lean R	Lean R	Lean R	Tossup	Tossup	Lean R	Lean D (flip)	Mike Garcia (R)
California 40	R+2	Young Kim	50.6% R	Likely R	Likely R	Likely R	Likely R	Likely R	Solid R	Likely R	Solid R	Likely R	Young Kim (R)
California 41	R+3	Ken Calvert	57.1% R	Lean R	Solid R	Likely R	Lean R	Likely R	Likely R	Likely R	Solid R	Likely R	Ken Calvert (R)
California 45	D+2	Michelle Steel	51.1% R	Lean R	Lean R	Lean R	Lean R	Likely R	Lean R	Lean R	Likely R	Tossup	Michelle Steel (R)
California 47	D+3	Katie Porter	53.5% D	Tossup	Tilt D	Lean D	Lean D	Tossup	Tossup	Likely D	Likely D	Likely D	Katie Porter (D)
California 49	D+3	Mike Levin	53.1% D	Tossup	Tilt D	Lean R (flip)	Tossup	Tossup	Tossup	Likely D	Likely D	Lean D	Mike Levin (D)
Colorado 3	R+7	Lauren Boebert	51.4% R	Solid R	Solid R	Likely R	Likely R	Likely R	Likely R	Solid R	Solid R	Likely R	Lauren Boebert (R)
Colorado 5	R+9	Doug Lamborn	57.6% R	Solid R	Solid R	Safe R	Likely R	Safe R	Solid R	Solid R	Solid R	Safe R	Doug Lamborn (R)
Colorado 7	D+4	Ed Perlmutter (retiring)	59.1% D	Likely D	Likely D	Lean D	Likely D	Lean D	Lean D	Lean D	Likely D	Likely D	Brittany Pettersen (D)
Colorado 8	EVEN	New seat	–	Tossup	Tilt R (flip)	Lean R (flip)	Tossup	Lean R (flip)	Lean R (flip)	Lean R (flip)	Likely R (flip)	Tossup	Yadira Caraveo (D)
Connecticut 2	D+3	Joe Courtney	59.4% D	Likely D	Solid D	Likely D	Likely D	Lean D	Lean D	Likely D	Solid D	Likely D	Joe Courtney (D)
Connecticut 3	D+7	Rosa DeLauro	58.7% D	Solid D	Solid D	Safe D	Solid D	Likely D	Likely D	Solid D	Solid D	Safe D	Rosa DeLauro (D)
Connecticut 5	D+3	Jahana Hayes	55.1% D	Tossup	Tossup	Lean R (flip)	Tossup	Tossup	Tossup	Lean D	Lean D	Tossup	Jahana Hayes (D)
Florida 2	R+8	Al Lawson (D) and Neal Dunn (R)	65.1% D; 97.9% R	Solid R	Solid R	Safe R	Likely R	Safe R	Solid R	Solid R	Solid R	Safe R	Neal Dunn (R)
Florida 4	R+6	New seat	–	Solid R (flip)	Likely R (flip)	Safe R (flip)	Likely R (flip)	Likely R (flip)	Solid R (flip)	Solid R (flip)	Solid R (flip)	Safe R (flip)	Aaron Bean (R)
Florida 7	R+5	Stephanie Murphy (retiring)	55.3% D	Solid R (flip)	Likely R (flip)	Safe R (flip)	Likely R (flip)	Likely R (flip)	Solid R (flip)	Solid R (flip)	Solid R (flip)	Safe R (flip)	Cory Mills (R)
Florida 9	D+8	Darren Soto	56.0% D	Solid D	Solid D	Safe D	Likely D	Likely D	Solid D	Solid D	Solid D	Likely D	Darren Soto (D)
Florida 13	R+6	Vacant	53.0% D	Lean R (flip)	Lean R (flip)	Likely R (flip)	Likely R (flip)	Likely R (flip)	Likely R (flip)	Likely R (flip)	Likely R (flip)	Lean R (flip)	Anna Paulina Luna (R)
Florida 14	D+8	Kathy Castor	60.3% D	Solid D	Solid D	Safe D	Solid D	Likely D	Solid D	Solid D	Solid D	Safe D	Kathy Castor (D)
Florida 15	R+4	New seat	–	Likely R	Likely R	Likely R	Likely R	Likely R	Likely R	Lean R	Solid R	Likely R	Laurel Lee (R)
Florida 16	R+7	Vern Buchanan	55.5% R	Solid R	Solid R	Safe R	Likely R	Safe R	Solid R	Solid R	Solid R	Safe R	Vern Buchanan (R)
Florida 22	D+7	Lois Frankel	59.0% D	Solid D	Solid D	Safe D	Likely D	Likely D	Likely D	Solid D	Solid D	Safe D	Lois Frankel (D)
Florida 23	D+5	Vacant	58.6% D	Solid D	Solid D	Likely D	Likely D	Lean D	Likely D	Solid D	Likely D	Safe D	Jared Moskowitz (D)
Florida 27	EVEN	María Elvira Salazar	51.4% R	Likely R	Likely R	Likely R	Lean R	Likely R	Likely R	Solid R	Likely R	Tossup	María Elvira Salazar (R)
Florida 28	R+2	Carlos A. Giménez	51.7% R	Solid R	Solid R	Safe R	Likely R	Likely R	Solid R	Solid R	Solid R	Likely R	Carlos A. Giménez (R)
Georgia 2	D+3	Sanford Bishop	59.1% D	Likely D	Solid D	Likely D	Likely D	Tossup	Lean D	Likely D	Likely D	Lean D	Sanford Bishop (D)
Georgia 6	R+11	New seat	–	Solid R (flip)	Likely R (flip)	Safe R (flip)	Solid R (flip)	Safe R (flip)	Solid R (flip)	Solid R (flip)	Solid R (flip)	Safe R (flip)	Rich McCormick (R)
Georgia 12	R+8	Rick W. Allen	58.4% R	Solid R	Solid R	Safe R	Likely R	Safe R	Solid R	Solid R	Solid R	Safe R	Rick W. Allen (R)
Illinois 6	D+3	Sean Casten	52.8% D	Lean D	Likely D	Lean D	Lean D	Tossup	Lean D	Likely D	Lean D	Likely D	Sean Casten (D)
Illinois 8	D+6	Raja Krishnamoorthi	73.2% D	Solid D	Solid D	Safe D	Likely D	Likely D	Solid D	Solid D	Solid D	Safe D	Raja Krishnamoorthi (D)
Illinois 11	D+5	Bill Foster	63.3% D	Likely D	Solid D	Likely D	Likely D	Likely D	Likely D	Likely D	Solid D	Likely D	Bill Foster (D)
Illinois 13	D+3	New seat	–	Lean D (flip)	Tilt D (flip)	Lean D (flip)	Lean D (flip)	Tossup	Lean D (flip)	Tossup	Likely D (flip)	Likely D (flip)	Nikki Budzinski (D)
Illinois 14	D+4	Lauren Underwood	50.7% D	Lean D	Likely D	Lean D	Likely D	Tossup	Lean D	Likely D	Likely D	Likely D	Lauren Underwood (D)
Illinois 17	D+2	Cheri Bustos (retiring)	52.0% D	Tossup	Tossup	Lean R (flip)	Tossup	Lean R (flip)	Tossup	Lean R (flip)	Lean D	Lean D	Eric Sorensen (D)
Indiana 1	D+3	Frank J. Mrvan	56.6% D	Tossup	Lean D	Lean D	Lean D	Tossup	Tossup	Likely D	Likely D	Lean D	Frank J. Mrvan (D)
Iowa 1	R+3	Mariannette Miller-Meeks	49.9% R	Lean R	Lean R	Likely R	Lean R	Lean R	Lean R	Solid R	Likely R	Lean R	Mariannette Miller-Meeks (R)
Iowa 2	R+4	Ashley Hinson	51.2% R	Lean R	Tilt R	Likely R	Lean R	Likely R	Likely R	Solid R	Likely R	Lean R	Ashley Hinson (R)
Iowa 3	R+3	Cindy Axne	48.9% D	Lean R (flip)	Tilt R (flip)	Lean R (flip)	Tossup	Lean R (flip)	Lean R (flip)	Tossup	Tossup	Tossup	Zach Nunn (R)
Kansas 3	R+1	Sharice Davids	53.6% D	Lean D	Tilt D	Lean D	Lean D	Tossup	Tossup	Lean D	Likely D	Likely D	Sharice Davids (D)
Maine 2	R+6	Jared Golden	53.0% D	Tossup	Tilt D	Lean D	Tossup	Tossup	Tossup	Tossup	Lean D	Tossup	Jared Golden (D)
Maryland 1	R+11	Andy Harris	63.4% R	Solid R	Solid R	Safe R	Likely R	Safe R	Solid R	Solid R	Solid R	Safe R	Andy Harris (R)
Maryland 2	D+7	Dutch Ruppersberger	67.7% D	Solid D	Solid D	Safe D	Solid D	Likely D	Solid D	Solid D	Solid D	Likely D	Dutch Ruppersberger (D)
Maryland 3	D+10	John Sarbanes	69.2% D	Solid D	Solid D	Safe D	Solid D	Safe D	Solid D	Solid D	Solid D	Likely D	John Sarbanes (D)
Maryland 6	D+2	David Trone	58.8% D	Likely D	Likely D	Lean D	Likely D	Tossup	Lean D	Likely D	Lean D	Tossup	David Trone (D)
Massachusetts 9	D+6	Bill Keating	61.3% D	Solid D	Solid D	Safe D	Likely D	Likely D	Likely D	Likely D	Solid D	Likely D	Bill Keating (D)
Michigan 3	D+1	Peter Meijer (lost renomination)	53.0% R	Lean D (flip)	Lean D (flip)	Lean D (flip)	Lean D (flip)	Tossup	Lean D (flip)	Lean R	Tossup	Lean D (flip)	Hillary Scholten (D)
Michigan 4	R+5	Bill Huizenga	59.2% R	Solid R	Solid R	Safe R	Likely R	Safe R	Solid R	Solid R	Solid R	Likely R	Bill Huizenga (R)
Michigan 7	R+2	Elissa Slotkin	50.9% D	Tossup	Tilt D	Lean R (flip)	Tossup	Tossup	Tossup	Tossup	Lean D	Tossup	Elissa Slotkin (D)
Michigan 8	R+1	Dan Kildee	54.4% D	Lean D	Lean D	Lean D	Lean D	Tossup	Tossup	Tossup	Likely D	Lean D	Dan Kildee (D)
Michigan 10	R+3	New seat	–	Likely R (flip)	Lean R (flip)	Lean R (flip)	Likely R (flip)	Likely R (flip)	Likely R (flip)	Likely R (flip)	Likely R (flip)	Lean R (flip)	John James (R)
Michigan 11	D+7	Haley Stevens	50.2% D	Solid D	Solid D	Safe D	Likely D	Likely D	Solid D	Solid D	Solid D	Safe D	Haley Stevens (D)
Minnesota 1	R+7	Brad Finstad	51.0% R	Likely R	Solid R	Likely R	Likely R	Likely R	Solid R	Solid R	Solid R	Likely R	Brad Finstad (R)
Minnesota 2	D+1	Angie Craig	48.2% D	Tossup	Tossup	Lean D	Tossup	Lean R (flip)	Tossup	Lean D	Likely D	Lean D	Angie Craig (D)
Minnesota 3	D+8	Dean Phillips	55.6% D	Solid D	Solid D	Safe D	Solid D	Likely D	Solid D	Solid D	Solid D	Safe D	Dean Phillips (D)
Minnesota 8	R+8	Pete Stauber	56.7% R	Solid R	Solid R	Safe R	Likely R	Safe R	Solid R	Solid R	Solid R	Safe R	Pete Stauber (R)
Missouri 2	R+7	Ann Wagner	51.9% R	Solid R	Solid R	Safe R	Likely R	Likely R	Solid R	Solid R	Solid R	Safe R	Ann Wagner (R)
Montana 1	R+6	New seat	–	Lean R (flip)	Lean R (flip)	Lean R (flip)	Likely R (flip)	Likely R (flip)	Lean R (flip)	Likely R (flip)	Likely R (flip)	Likely R (flip)	Ryan Zinke
Nebraska 1	R+9	Mike Flood	52.7% R	Solid R	Solid R	Safe R	Likely R	Safe R	Solid R	Solid R	Solid R	Likely R	Mike Flood (R)
Nebraska 2	EVEN	Don Bacon	50.8% R	Tossup	Tossup	Lean R	Tossup	Lean R	Likely R	Likely R	Likely R	Tossup	Don Bacon (R)
Nevada 1	D+3	Dina Titus	61.8% D	Tossup	Tilt D	Lean D	Lean D	Lean R (flip)	Tossup	Tossup	Tossup	Tossup	Dina Titus (D)
Nevada 2	R+8	Mark Amodei	56.5% R	Solid R	Solid R	Safe R	Likely R	Safe R	Solid R	Solid R	Solid R	Safe R	Mark Amodei (R)
Nevada 3	D+1	Susie Lee	48.8% D	Tossup	Tilt D	Lean R (flip)	Tossup	Lean R (flip)	Lean R (flip)	Tossup	Lean D	Tossup	Susie Lee (D)
Nevada 4	D+3	Steven Horsford	50.7% D	Lean D	Lean D	Lean D	Lean D	Tossup	Tossup	Lean D	Likely D	Likely D	Steven Horsford (D)
New Hampshire 1	EVEN	Chris Pappas	51.3% D	Tossup	Tilt D	Lean D	Tossup	Lean R (flip)	Tossup	Tossup	Lean D	Tossup	Chris Pappas (D)
New Hampshire 2	D+2	Annie Kuster	53.9% D	Lean D	Likely D	Likely D	Lean D	Tossup	Lean D	Likely D	Likely D	Likely D	Annie Kuster (D)
New Jersey 1	D+10	Donald Norcross	62.5% D	Solid D	Solid D	Safe D	Solid D	Likely D	Solid D	Solid D	Solid D	Safe D	Donald Norcross (D)
New Jersey 2	R+5	Jeff Van Drew	51.9% R	Solid R	Solid R	Safe R	Likely R	Safe R	Solid R	Solid R	Solid R	Safe R	Jeff Van Drew (R)
New Jersey 3	D+5	Andy Kim	53.2% D	Lean D	Likely D	Likely D	Likely D	Lean D	Lean D	Solid D	Likely D	Likely D	Andy Kim (D)
New Jersey 5	D+4	Josh Gottheimer	53.2% D	Likely D	Solid D	Likely D	Likely D	Lean D	Likely D	Solid D	Likely D	Likely D	Josh Gottheimer (D)
New Jersey 7	R+1	Tom Malinowski	50.6% D	Lean R (flip)	Tilt R (flip)	Lean R (flip)	Lean R (flip)	Lean R (flip)	Lean R (flip)	Tossup	Lean R (flip)	Tossup	Thomas Kean Jr. (R)
New Jersey 9	D+8	Bill Pascrell	65.8% D	Solid D	Solid D	Safe D	Solid D	Likely D	Solid D	Solid D	Solid D	Safe D	Bill Pascrell (D)
New Jersey 11	D+6	Mikie Sherrill	53.3% D	Solid D	Solid D	Likely D	Likely D	Lean D	Likely D	Solid D	Solid D	Safe D	Mikie Sherrill (D)
New Mexico 1	D+5	Melanie Stansbury	60.4% D	Solid D	Solid D	Likely D	Likely D	Lean D	Likely D	Likely D	Solid D	Likely D	Melanie Stansbury (D)
New Mexico 2	D+1	Yvette Herrell	53.7% R	Tossup	Tossup	Lean R	Tossup	Lean R	Tossup	Lean R	Likely R	Tossup	Gabe Vasquez (D)
New Mexico 3	D+4	Teresa Leger Fernandez	58.7% D	Likely D	Solid D	Likely D	Lean D	Lean D	Likely D	Likely D	Solid D	Safe D	Teresa Leger Fernandez (D)
New York 1	R+3	Lee Zeldin (retiring)	54.9% R	Lean R	Lean R	Lean R	Lean R	Safe R	Lean R	Likely R	Likely R	Lean R	Nick LaLota (R)
New York 2	R+3	Andrew Garbarino	52.9% R	Likely R	Lean R	Likely R	Likely R	Safe R	Solid R	Likely R	Solid R	Likely R	Andrew Garbarino (R)
New York 3	D+2	Thomas Suozzi (retiring)	56.0% D	Tossup	Tilt D	Lean R (flip)	Lean D	Tossup	Tossup	Lean D	Lean D	Lean D	George Santos (R)
New York 4	D+5	Kathleen Rice (retiring)	56.1% D	Tossup	Tilt D	Lean D	Lean D	Tossup	Lean D	Lean D	Likely D	Likely D	Anthony D'Esposito (R)
New York 11	R+6	Nicole Malliotakis	53.2% R	Likely R	Likely R	Likely R	Likely R	Likely R	Likely R	Likely R	Solid R	Likely R	Nicole Malliotakis (R)
New York 17	D+3	Sean Patrick Maloney	55.8% D	Tossup	Tossup	Lean D	Lean D	Tossup	Tossup	Likely D	Lean D	Lean D	Mike Lawler (R)
New York 18	D+1	Pat Ryan	51.9% D	Lean D	Tilt D	Lean D	Lean D	Tossup	Tossup	Likely D	Lean D	Lean D	Pat Ryan (D)
New York 19	EVEN	New seat	–	Tossup	Tossup	Lean R (flip)	Tossup	Tossup	Lean R (flip)	Lean R (flip)	Tossup	Tossup	Marc Molinaro (R)
New York 20	D+7	Paul Tonko	61.2% D	Solid D	Solid D	Safe D	Likely D	Likely D	Solid D	Solid D	Solid D	Likely D	Paul Tonko (D)
New York 22	D+1	John Katko (retiring)	53.1% R	Tossup	Tossup	Lean R	Tossup	Lean R	Lean R	Lean R	Lean R	Tossup	Brandon Williams (R)
New York 25	D+7	Joseph Morelle	59.3% D	Likely D	Likely D	Likely D	Solid D	Tossup	Likely D	Solid D	Solid D	Likely D	Joseph Morelle (D)
New York 26	D+8	Brian Higgins	69.9% D	Solid D	Solid D	Safe D	Solid D	Likely D	Solid D	Solid D	Solid D	Safe D	Brian Higgins (D)
North Carolina 1	D+2	G. K. Butterfield (retiring)	54.2% D	Likely D	Likely D	Lean D	Likely D	Tossup	Lean D	Lean D	Solid D	Likely D	Don Davis (D)
North Carolina 6	D+4	Kathy Manning	62.3% D	Likely D	Solid D	Likely D	Lean D	Likely D	Likely D	Solid D	Solid D	Likely D	Kathy Manning (D)
North Carolina 7	R+8	David Rouzer	60.2% R	Solid R	Solid R	Safe R	Likely R	Safe R	Solid R	Solid R	Solid R	Safe R	David Rouzer (R)
North Carolina 9	R+6	Richard Hudson	53.3% R	Solid R	Solid R	Safe R	Likely R	Safe R	Solid R	Solid R	Solid R	Safe R	Richard Hudson (R)
North Carolina 11	R+8	Madison Cawthorn (lost renomination)	54.5% R	Solid R	Solid R	Safe R	Solid R	Safe R	Solid R	Solid R	Solid R	Likely R	Chuck Edwards (R)
North Carolina 13	R+2	New seat	–	Tossup	Tossup	Lean R	Tossup	Lean R	Lean R	Likely R	Likely R	Tossup	Wiley Nickel (D)
North Carolina 14	D+6	New seat	–	Solid D (flip)	Solid D (flip)	Safe D (flip)	Likely D (flip)	Likely D (flip)	Likely D (flip)	Likely D (flip)	Solid D (flip)	Safe D (flip)	Jeff Jackson (D)
Ohio 1	D+2	Steve Chabot	51.8% R	Tossup	Tossup	Lean R	Tossup	Lean R	Lean R	Tossup	Lean R	Tossup	Greg Landsman (D)
Ohio 7	R+7	Bob Gibbs (retiring)	67.5% R	Solid R	Solid R	Safe R	Likely R	Safe R	Solid R	Solid R	Solid R	Safe R	Max Miller (R)
Ohio 9	R+3	Marcy Kaptur	63.1% D	Lean D	Lean D	Lean D	Lean D	Tossup	Lean D	Lean R (flip)	Lean D	Tossup	Marcy Kaptur (D)
Ohio 10	R+4	Mike Turner	58.4% R	Solid R	Solid R	Safe R	Likely R	Safe R	Solid R	Solid R	Solid R	Safe R	Mike Turner (R)
Ohio 13	R+1	Tim Ryan (retiring)	52.5% D	Tossup	Tossup	Lean R (flip)	Tossup	Lean R (flip)	Tossup	Likely R (flip)	Lean R (flip)	Tossup	Emilia Sykes (D)
Ohio 15	R+6	Mike Carey	58.3% R	Solid R	Solid R	Safe R	Likely R	Safe R	Solid R	Solid R	Solid R	Safe R	Mike Carey (R)
Oregon 4	D+4	Peter DeFazio (retiring)	51.5% D	Lean D	Tilt D	Lean D	Lean D	Tossup	Lean D	Tossup	Likely D	Lean D	Val Hoyle (D)
Oregon 5	D+2	Kurt Schrader (lost renomination)	51.9% D	Lean R (flip)	Tilt R (flip)	Lean R (flip)	Lean R (flip)	Lean R (flip)	Lean R (flip)	Tossup	Lean R (flip)	Tossup	Lori Chavez-DeRemer (R)
Oregon 6	D+4	New seat	–	Tossup	Tossup	Lean D (flip)	Tossup	Tossup	Tossup	Tossup	Lean D (flip)	Lean D (flip)	Andrea Salinas (D)
Pennsylvania 1	EVEN	Brian Fitzpatrick	56.6% R	Solid R	Solid R	Likely R	Likely R	Lean R	Likely R	Solid R	Solid R	Likely R	Brian Fitzpatrick (R)
Pennsylvania 6	D+5	Chrissy Houlahan	56.1% D	Solid D	Solid D	Likely D	Likely D	Lean D	Solid D	Solid D	Solid D	Likely D	Chrissy Houlahan (D)
Pennsylvania 7	R+2	Susan Wild	51.9% D	Tossup	Tossup	Lean R (flip)	Tossup	Lean R (flip)	Lean R (flip)	Tossup	Lean R (flip)	Tossup	Susan Wild (D)
Pennsylvania 8	R+4	Matt Cartwright	51.8% D	Tossup	Tossup	Lean R (flip)	Tossup	Lean R (flip)	Tossup	Tossup	Tossup	Tossup	Matt Cartwright (D)
Pennsylvania 10	R+5	Scott Perry	53.3% R	Solid R	Solid R	Safe R	Lean R	Likely R	Solid R	Solid R	Solid R	Likely R	Scott Perry (R)
Pennsylvania 12	D+8	Mike Doyle (retiring)	69.3% D	Likely D	Likely D	Likely D	Likely D	Lean D	Likely D	Likely D	Solid D	Likely D	Summer Lee (D)
Pennsylvania 17	EVEN	Conor Lamb (retiring)	51.1% D	Tossup	Tossup	Lean R (flip)	Tossup	Lean R (flip)	Tossup	Lean R (flip)	Tossup	Tossup	Chris Deluzio (D)
Rhode Island 2	D+4	James Langevin (retiring)	58.2% D	Tossup	Tossup	Lean R (flip)	Tossup	Lean R (flip)	Tossup	Tossup	Tossup	Tossup	Seth Magaziner (D)
South Carolina 1	R+7	Nancy Mace	50.6% R	Solid R	Solid R	Safe R	Likely R	Safe R	Solid R	Solid R	Solid R	Likely R	Nancy Mace (R)
Tennessee 5	R+9	Jim Cooper (retiring)	100.0% D	Likely R (flip)	Likely R (flip)	Safe R (flip)	Likely R (flip)	Likely R (flip)	Solid R (flip)	Likely R (flip)	Solid R (flip)	Likely R (flip)	Andy Ogles (R)
Texas 15	R+1	New seat	–	Likely R (flip)	Lean R (flip)	Likely R (flip)	Lean R (flip)	Lean R (flip)	Lean R (flip)	Lean R (flip)	Tossup	Lean R (flip)	Monica De La Cruz (R)
Texas 23	R+5	Tony Gonzales	50.6% R	Solid R	Solid R	Safe R	Likely R	Safe R	Solid R	Solid R	Solid R	Safe R	Tony Gonzales (R)
Texas 28	D+3	Henry Cuellar	58.3% D	Tossup	Lean D	Lean D	Lean D	Tossup	Tossup	Lean D	Likely D	Likely D	Henry Cuellar (D)
Texas 34	D+9	Vicente Gonzalez (D) and Mayra Flores (R)	50.5% D; 50.9% R	Tossup	Tossup	Lean R	Tossup	Tossup	Tossup	Tossup	Tossup	Lean D (flip)	Vicente Gonzalez (D)
Virginia 1	R+6	Rob Wittman	58.2% R	Solid R	Solid R	Safe R	Likely R	Safe R	Solid R	Solid R	Solid R	Safe R	Rob Wittman (R)
Virginia 2	R+2	Elaine Luria	51.6% D	Tossup	Tilt R (flip)	Lean R (flip)	Tossup	Lean R (flip)	Lean R (flip)	Tossup	Tossup	Tossup	Jen Kiggans (R)
Virginia 5	R+7	Bob Good	52.4% R	Solid R	Solid R	Safe R	Likely R	Safe R	Solid R	Solid R	Solid R	Safe R	Bob Good (R)
Virginia 7	D+1	Abigail Spanberger	50.8% D	Tossup	Tilt D	Lean D	Tossup	Tossup	Tossup	Lean D	Lean D	Lean D	Abigail Spanberger (D)
Virginia 10	D+6	Jennifer Wexton	56.5% D	Likely D	Likely D	Likely D	Likely D	Lean D	Likely D	Likely D	Likely D	Likely D	Jennifer Wexton (D)
Washington 3	R+5	Jaime Herrera Beutler (lost renomination)	56.4% R	Lean R	Lean R	Likely R	Lean R	Likely R	Likely R	Likely R	Solid R	Likely R	Marie Gluesenkamp Perez (D)
Washington 5	R+8	Cathy McMorris Rodgers	61.3% R	Solid R	Solid R	Safe R	Likely R	Safe R	Solid R	Solid R	Solid R	Safe R	Cathy McMorris Rodgers (R)
Washington 6	D+6	Derek Kilmer	59.3% D	Solid D	Solid D	Safe D	Likely D	Likely D	Solid D	Solid D	Solid D	Safe D	Derek Kilmer (D)
Washington 8	D+1	Kim Schrier	51.7% D	Tossup	Tossup	Lean R (flip)	Tossup	Lean R (flip)	Tossup	Lean D	Lean D	Lean D	Kim Schrier (D)
Washington 10	D+7	Marilyn Strickland	49.3% D	Solid D	Solid D	Safe D	Solid D	Likely D	Solid D	Solid D	Solid D	Safe D	Marilyn Strickland (D)
Wisconsin 1	R+3	Bryan Steil	59.3% R	Solid R	Solid R	Safe R	Likely R	Safe R	Solid R	Solid R	Solid R	Likely R	Bryan Steil (R)
Wisconsin 3	R+4	Ron Kind (retiring)	51.3% D	Likely R (flip)	Lean R (flip)	Likely R (flip)	Likely R (flip)	Likely R (flip)	Lean R (flip)	Solid R (flip)	Likely R (flip)	Likely R (flip)	Derrick Van Orden (R)
Overall				D – 191; R – 211; 33 tossups	D – 199; R – 216; 20 tossups	D – 198; R – 237	D – 195; R – 213; 27 tossups	D – 174; R – 227; 38 tossups	D – 186; R – 216; 33 tossups	D – 200; R – 223; 12 tossups	D – 203; R – 219; 13 tossups	D – 200; R – 208; 27 tossups	D - 213 ▼9 R - 222 ▲9
District	CPVI	Incumbent	Previous result	Cook	IE	Sabato	Politico	RCP	Fox	DDHQ	538	Econ.	Winner

=== Generic ballot polls ===
The following is a list of generic party ballot polls conducted in advance of the 2022 House of Representatives elections.

Polling aggregates
Source of poll aggregation	Date updated	Dates polled	Democratic	Republican	Lead
RealClearPolitics	November 8, 2022	October 18 – November 6, 2022	45.5%	48.0%	+2.5
FiveThirtyEight	November 8, 2022	October 26 – November 8, 2022	45.7%	46.9%	+1.2
Average			45.6%	47.4%	+1.8

== Party listings ==
The campaign committees for the two parties (the DCCC and NRCC) publish their own lists of targeted seats.

=== Democratic-held seats ===
The NRCC is now targeting 85 Democratic held seats. They released their initial list February 10, 2021 and added 10 seats to the initial list on May 4, 2021 and a further 13 seats November 3, 2021 after the favorable election night results. They added eight additional seats on March 30, 2022. The first two lists were published before redistricting, but the 3rd list begins to incorporate redistricting impacts such as Colorado's 7th congressional district. Seats in bold were included in the DCCC's frontline seats in March 2021 or were added in January 2022.

Republican target seats
1. **Arizona 1: Tom O'Halleran**
2. **Arizona 4: Greg Stanton**
3. Arizona 6: Ann Kirkpatrick (retiring)
4. California 3: None (new seat)
5. California 7: Ami Bera
6. **California 9: Josh Harder**
7. California 13: Barbara Lee (running in California 12)
8. California 20: Jim Costa
9. California 26: Julia Brownley
10. California 36: Raul Ruiz
11. **California 47: Katie Porter**
12. **California 49: Mike Levin**
13. Colorado 7: Ed Perlmutter (retiring)
14. Connecticut 2: Joe Courtney
15. **Connecticut 5: Jahana Hayes**
16. Florida 7: Stephanie Murphy (retiring)
17. Florida 9: Darren Soto
18. Florida 13: Charlie Crist (retiring)
19. Florida 14: Kathy Castor
20. Florida 22: Ted Deutch (retiring)
21. **Georgia 2: Sanford Bishop**
22. **Georgia 6: Lucy McBath (running in Georgia's 7th congressional district)**
23. **Georgia 7: Carolyn Bourdeaux (lost renomination)**
24. Illinois 3: Marie Newman (lost renomination)
25. Illinois 6: Sean Casten
26. Illinois 8: Raja Krishnamoorthi
27. Illinois 11: Bill Foster
28. **Illinois 14: Lauren Underwood**
29. Illinois 17: Cheri Bustos (retiring)
30. Indiana 1: Frank Mrvan
31. **Iowa 3: Cindy Axne**
32. **Kansas 3: Sharice Davids**
33. **Maine 2: Jared Golden**
34. Maryland 2: Dutch Ruppersberger
35. Maryland 3: John Sarbanes
36. Maryland 6: David Trone
37. **Michigan 7: Elissa Slotkin**
38. **Michigan 8: Dan Kildee**
39. Michigan 11: Haley Stevens
40. **Minnesota 2: Angie Craig**
41. Minnesota 3: Dean Phillips
42. Nevada 1: Dina Titus
43. **Nevada 3: Susie Lee**
44. **Nevada 4: Steven Horsford**
45. **New Hampshire 1: Chris Pappas**
46. New Hampshire 2: Annie Kuster
47. **New Jersey 3: Andy Kim**
48. **New Jersey 5: Josh Gottheimer**
49. **New Jersey 7: Tom Malinowski**
50. **New Jersey 11: Mikie Sherrill**
51. New Mexico 1: Melanie Stansbury
52. New Mexico 3: Teresa Leger Fernandez
53. New York 3: Thomas Suozzi
54. New York 4: Kathleen Rice (retiring)
55. New York 17: Mondaire Jones (lost renomination)
56. New York 18: Sean Patrick Maloney (running in New York's 17th congressional district)
57. New York 20: Paul Tonko
58. New York 25: Joe Morelle
59. New York 26: Brian Higgins
60. North Carolina 1: G. K. Butterfield (retiring)
61. North Carolina 2: Deborah Ross
62. North Carolina 6: Kathy Manning
63. North Carolina 14: Jeff Jackson
64. Ohio 9: Marcy Kaptur
65. Ohio 13: Tim Ryan (retiring)
66. **Oregon 4: Peter DeFazio (retiring)**
67. Oregon 5: Kurt Schrader (lost renomination)
68. Oregon 6: None (new seat)
69. Pennsylvania 4: Madeleine Dean
70. Pennsylvania 5: Mary Gay Scanlon
71. Pennsylvania 6: Chrissy Houlahan
72. **Pennsylvania 7: Susan Wild**
73. **Pennsylvania 8: Matt Cartwright**
74. Pennsylvania 12: Mike Doyle (retiring)
75. **Pennsylvania 17: Conor Lamb (retiring)**
76. Tennessee 5: Jim Cooper (retiring)
77. **Texas 7: Lizzie Fletcher**
78. **Texas 15: Vicente Gonzalez (running in Texas's 34th congressional district)**
79. Texas 28: Henry Cuellar
80. **Texas 32: Colin Allred**
81. **Virginia 2: Elaine Luria**
82. **Virginia 7: Abigail Spanberger**
83. **Virginia 10: Jennifer Wexton**
84. **Washington 8: Kim Schrier**
85. **Wisconsin 3: Ron Kind (retiring)**

=== Republican-held seats ===
On April 6, 2021, the DCCC released their list of target seats, including open and Republican-held seats. This list was published before redistricting. Several seats were added in January 2022.

Democratic target seats
1. Arizona 1: David Schweikert
2. California 22: David Valadao
3. California 27: Mike Garcia
4. California 40: Young Kim
5. California 41: Ken Calvert
6. California 45: Michelle Steel
7. Florida 26: Carlos Giménez
8. Florida 27: Maria Elvira Salazar
9. Indiana 5: Victoria Spartz
10. Iowa 1: Ashley Hinson
11. Iowa 2: Mariannette Miller-Meeks
12. Maryland 1: Andy Harris
13. Michigan 3: Peter Meijer (lost renomination)
14. Missouri 2: Ann Wagner
15. Nebraska 2: Don Bacon
16. New Mexico 2: Yvette Herrell
17. New York 2: Andrew Garbarino
18. New York 22: John Katko (retiring)
19. New York 24: Claudia Tenney
20. Ohio 1: Steve Chabot
21. Pennsylvania 1: Brian Fitzpatrick
22. Pennsylvania 10: Scott Perry
23. Texas 23: Tony Gonzales
24. Texas 24: Beth Van Duyne
25. Utah 4: Burgess Owens
