= 2022 Texas's 34th congressional district special election =

- June 14, 2022

Texas's 34th congressional district
- Turnout: 7.36%
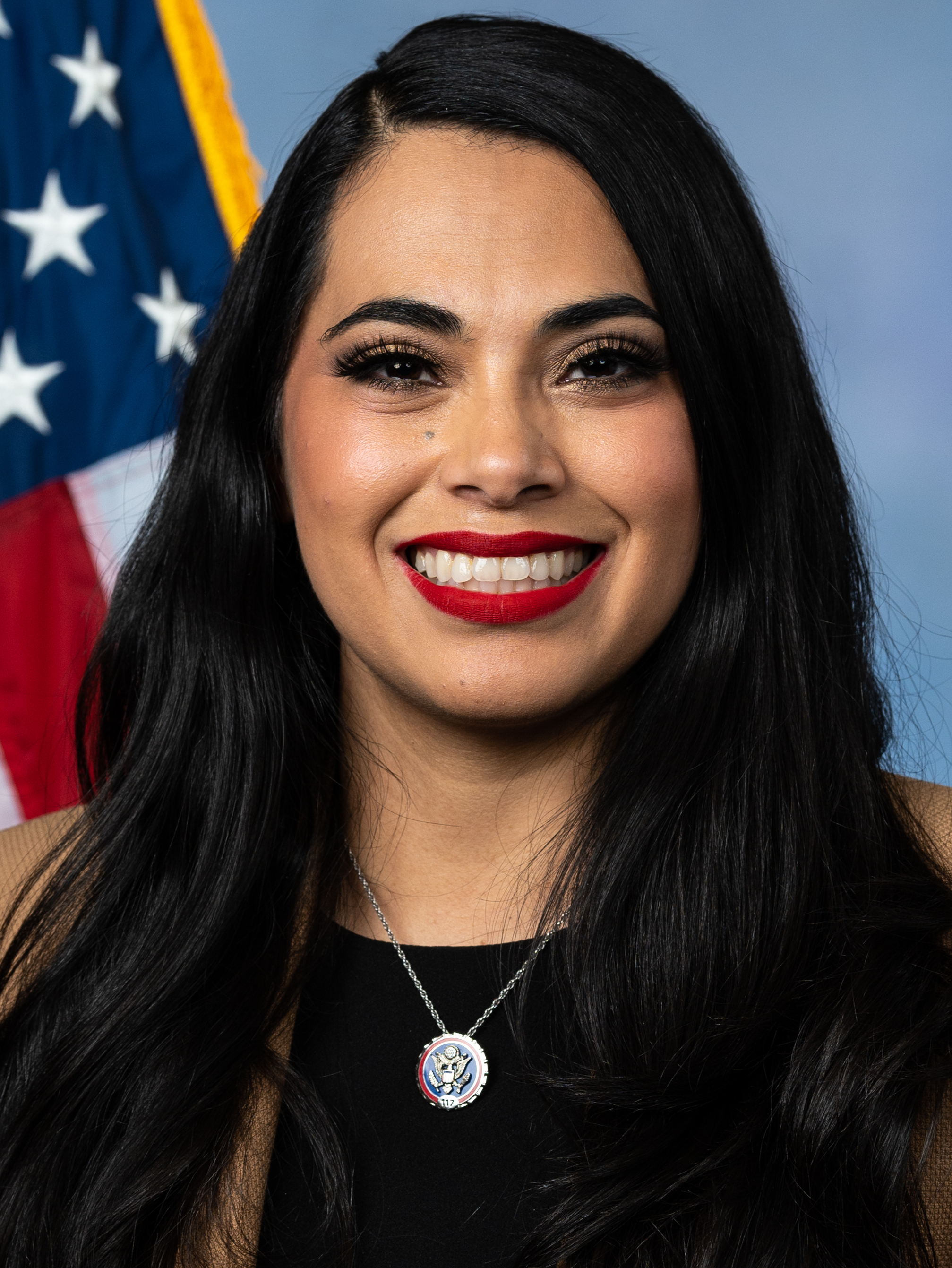

Candidate	Mayra Flores	Dan Sanchez
Party	Republican	Democratic
Popular vote	14,799	12,606
Percentage	50.9%	43.4%
- County results Flores: 40–50% 50–60% 70–80% 80–90% Sanchez: 50–60%
U.S. Representative before election
Filemon Vela Jr.
Democratic
Elected U.S. Representative
Mayra Flores
Republican

The 2022 Texas's 34th congressional district special election was held on June 14, 2022. The seat, which went to Democratic president Joe Biden by only four points in the 2020 United States presidential election after being solidly blue in the past, became vacant after Democratic incumbent representative Filemon Vela Jr. resigned on March 31, 2022, to work at the law firm Akin Gump Strauss Hauer & Feld.

Republican candidate Mayra Flores won outright with 51% of the vote. Although Democrat Dan Sanchez was able to hold on to the Hidalgo County portion of the district by nine points, as well as flip Kenedy County after it went to Donald Trump in 2020, this was not enough to overcome Flores's gains in Cameron and Willacy Counties, resulting in them narrowly flipping red in this race after going to Biden by double digits in the 2020 contest. Flores was also able to shore up support in the district's northern rural counties, which typically voted Republican in the past. Flores became the first Republican to represent parts of the Rio Grande Valley since Blake Farenthold flipped the 27th district in 2010.

== Candidates ==
=== Democratic Party ===
==== Declared ====
- Rene Coronado, civil service director
- Dan Sanchez, former Cameron County commissioner

==== Declined ====
- Vicente Gonzalez, U.S. Representative for Texas's 15th congressional district and nominee for this district in the 2022 regular election (endorsed Sanchez)

=== Republican Party ===
==== Declared ====
- Juana Cantu-Cabrera, former Palmhurst city councilor and candidate for this district in the 2022 regular election
- Mayra Flores, respiratory care practitioner, Hidalgo County GOP Hispanic outreach chair, and nominee for this district in the 2022 regular election

== Endorsements ==
Mayra Flores (R)

U.S. Representatives

- Elise Stefanik, U.S. Representative from New York's 21st congressional district (2015–present) and Chair of the House Republican Conference (2021–present)

State officials

- Greg Abbott, Governor of Texas (2015–present)
- Matt Rinaldi, chair of the Republican Party of Texas (2021–present) and former state representative (2015–2019)

Organizations

- Congressional Leadership Fund

Others

- Elon Musk, CEO of SpaceX and Tesla, Inc.
- Peter Thiel, Venture capitalist
Dan Sanchez (D)

U.S. Representatives

- Vicente Gonzalez, U.S. Representative from Texas's 15th congressional district (2017–present)
- Filemon Vela Jr., former U.S. Representative from Texas's 34th congressional district (2013–2022)

Organizations

- Congressional Hispanic Caucus BOLD PAC

== Special election ==
=== Predictions ===
Source	Ranking	As of
The Cook Political Report	Tossup	April 8, 2022
Inside Elections	Tossup	June 3, 2022
Sabato's Crystal Ball	Lean R (flip)	March 30, 2022

=== Polling ===
Poll source	Date(s) administered	Sample size (Note: Key: A – all adults RV – registered voters LV – likely voters V – unclear)	Margin of error	Juana Cantu-Cabrera (R)	Rene Coronado (D)	Mayra Flores (R)	Dan Sanchez (D)	Undecided
RRH Elections (R)	June 8–11, 2022	484 (LV)	± 5.0%	3%	7%	43%	34%	13%
Ragnar Research Partners (R) (Note: Poll sponsored jointly by the National Republican Congressional Committee and Flores's campaign committee)	April 19–21, 2022	400 (LV)	± 4.9%	7%	9%	24%	19%	41%

=== Fundraising ===
Campaign finance reports
Candidate	Amount raised	Amount spent	Cash on hand
Mayra Flores (R)	$1,722,406	$1,608,423	$113,983
Daniel Sanchez (D)	$173,668	$173,668	$0
Source: OpenSecrets

=== Results ===
2022 Texas's 34th congressional district special election results
Party	Candidate	Votes	%
Republican	Mayra Flores	14,799	50.91
Democratic	Dan Sanchez	12,606	43.37
Democratic	Rene Coronado	1,210	4.16
Republican	Juana Cantu-Cabrera	454	1.56
Total votes		29,069	100.00
Registered electors		395,025	
Republican gain from Democratic			

By county

County	Mayra Flores Republican		Dan Sanchez Democratic		Rene Coronado Democratic		Juana Cantu-Cabrera Republican		Margin		Total votes	Turnout
County	#	%	#	%	#	%	#	%	#	%	Total votes	Turnout
Bee	992	74.6	282	21.2	33	2.5	23	1.7	710	53.4	1,330	8.47
Cameron	9,072	47.5	8,875	46.5	891	4.7	267	1.4	197	1.0	19,105	8.48
DeWitt	713	82.0	98	11.3	10	1.1	49	5.6	615	70.7	870	7.18
Goliad	395	79.6	76	15.3	14	2.8	11	2.2	319	64.3	496	8.63
Gonzales (part)	158	82.3	20	10.4	5	2.6	9	4.7	138	71.9	192	4.26
Hidalgo (part)	1,203	42.8	1,464	52.1	111	3.9	34	1.2	261	9.3	2,812	4.80
Jim Wells	651	51.3	571	45.0	34	2.7	14	1.1	80	6.3	1,270	4.80
Kenedy	13	43.3	15	50.0	0	0.0	2	6.7	2	6.7	30	9.71
Kleberg	864	57.0	567	37.4	65	4.3	20	1.3	297	19.6	1,516	8.21
San Patricio (part)	385	52.5	297	40.5	31	4.2	20	2.7	88	12.0	733	4.62
Willacy	353	49.4	341	47.7	16	2.2	5	0.7	12	1.7	715	6.05
Totals	14,799	50.9	12,606	43.4	1,210	4.2	454	1.6	2,193	7.5	29,069	7.36

== See also ==
- 2022 United States House of Representatives elections
- 2022 United States elections
- 117th United States Congress
- List of special elections to the United States House of Representatives

== Notes ==
Partisan clients
