= El Salvador Caucus =

Congressional caucus in the United States

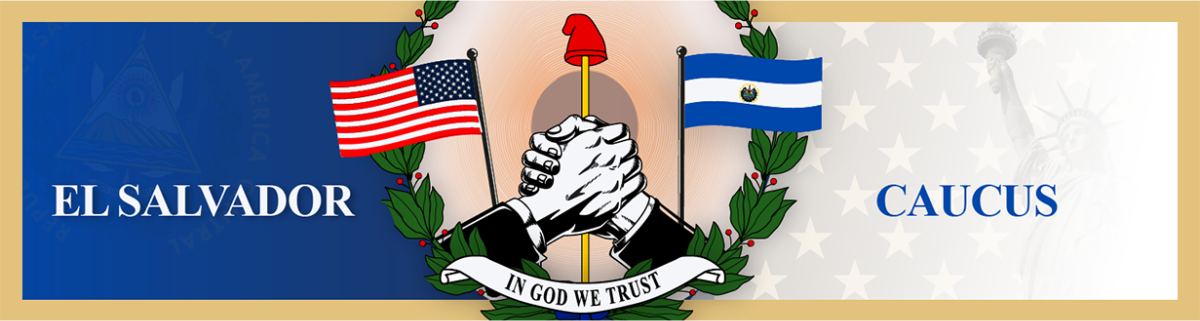
- Co-chairs: Anna Paulina Luna (R, FL-13); Vicente Gonzalez (D, TX-34)
- Founder: Matt Gaetz (R)
- Founded: July 8, 2024; 21 months ago
- Seats in the House: 16 / 435

Website
- gaetz.house.gov/ElSalvadorCaucus

The Congressional El Salvador Caucus is a bi-partisan congressional caucus of the United States Congress that supports strengthening relations with the country of El Salvador. The caucus was founded by former Republican representative Matt Gaetz in July 2024 and is co-chaired by Republican congresswoman Anna Paulina Luna and Democratic congressman Vicente Gonzalez.

== Purpose ==
The El Salvador Caucus' purpose is to promote strengthened relations between the United States and El Salvador. The caucus itself describes its purpose as being to "a better understanding of issues related to the United States' relationship with El Salvador, our mutual interests and the interests of the United States". According to caucus founder and Republican congressman Matt Gaetz, the El Salvador Caucus also aims to "encourage the strong reforms that President [Nayib] Bukele has put into effect" and "vindicate the choices President Bukele has made".

According to the Committee in Solidarity with the People of El Salvador (CISPES), the caucus additionally serves to "boost the image of Bukele" and promote his political agenda within the United States. It further claimed that the caucus was "whitewashing" alleged human rights abuses committed by Bukele's government. Gaetz denied CISPES' description of the caucus as "baseless" and denounced the group for supposedly "ignor[ing] the anarcho-tyranny of the gangs".

== History ==
The El Salvador Caucus was established by Gaetz on 8 July 2024. He and Democratic congressman Vicente Gonzalez became the caucus' co-chairmen. The caucus was founded one month after they and four other U.S. congress members — representatives Adriano Espaillat, María Elvira Salazar, and Lou Correa, and Senator Mike Lee — attended Bukele's second inauguration on June 1, 2024 in San Salvador. In late July 2024, Gaetz and three other Republican members of the El Salvador Caucus visited El Salvador, met with Bukele, and toured the Terrorism Confinement Center (CECOT), a prison built by Bukele's government amidst a nationwide gang crackdown.

On August 6, 2024, the caucus sent a letter to Antony Blinken, the secretary of state, requesting that the United States Department of State reduces its travel advisory's status on El Salvador citing a decrease in crime during Bukele's presidency. The State Department did decrease its travel advisory status for El Salvador from Level 3 to Level 2 on November 8, 2024. After President-elect Donald Trump announced his intention to nominate Gaetz as his attorney general and Gaetz's subsequent resignation from the United States Congress, Republican congresswoman Anna Paulina Luna succeeded Gaetz as the caucus' Republican co-chair.

The caucus supported a March 2026 constitutional reform that enabled courts to sentence individuals convicted of murder, rape, or terrorism to life imprisonment, writing on social media that "this is the leadership other Latin American countries should follow".

== Membership ==
=== Current members ===
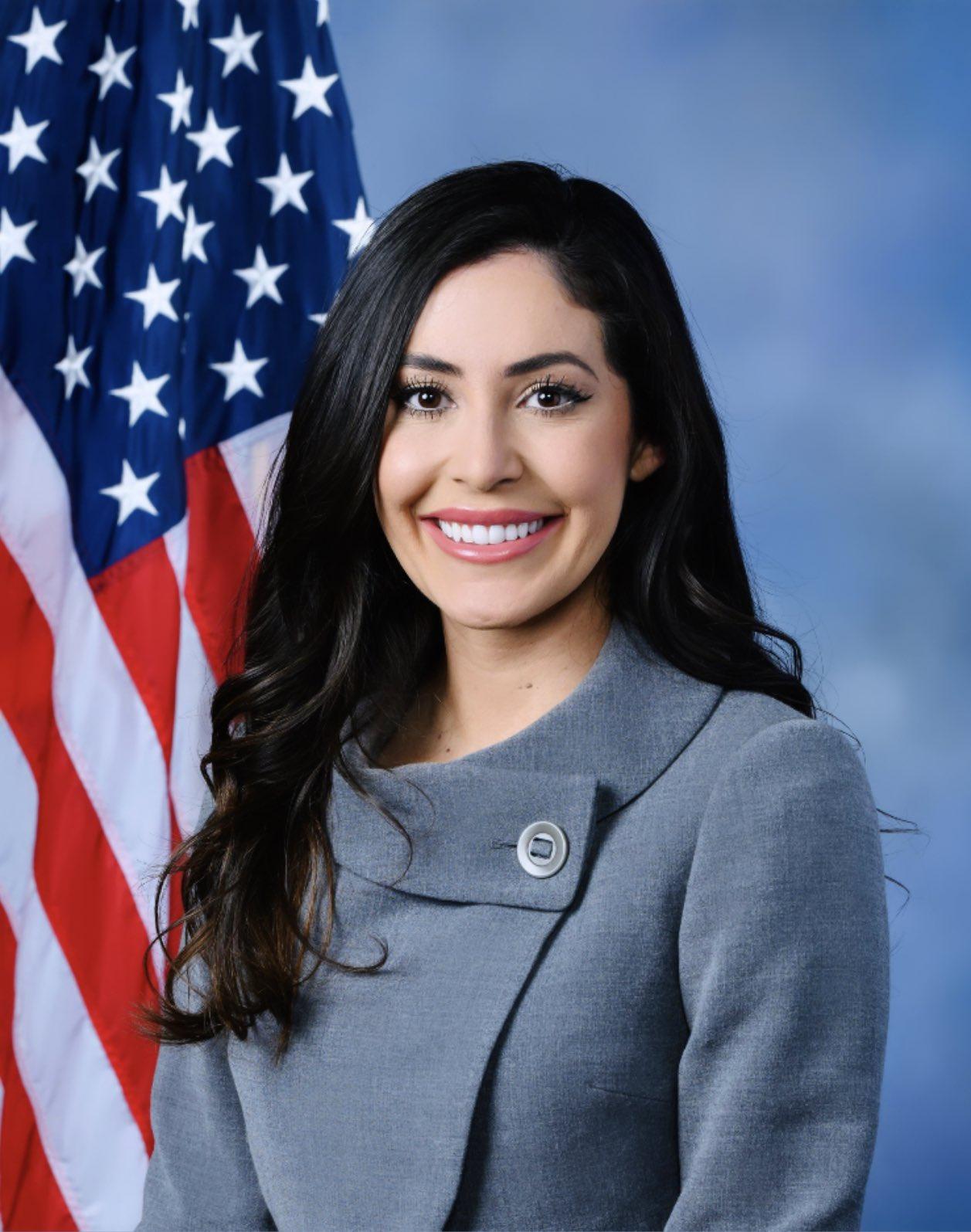
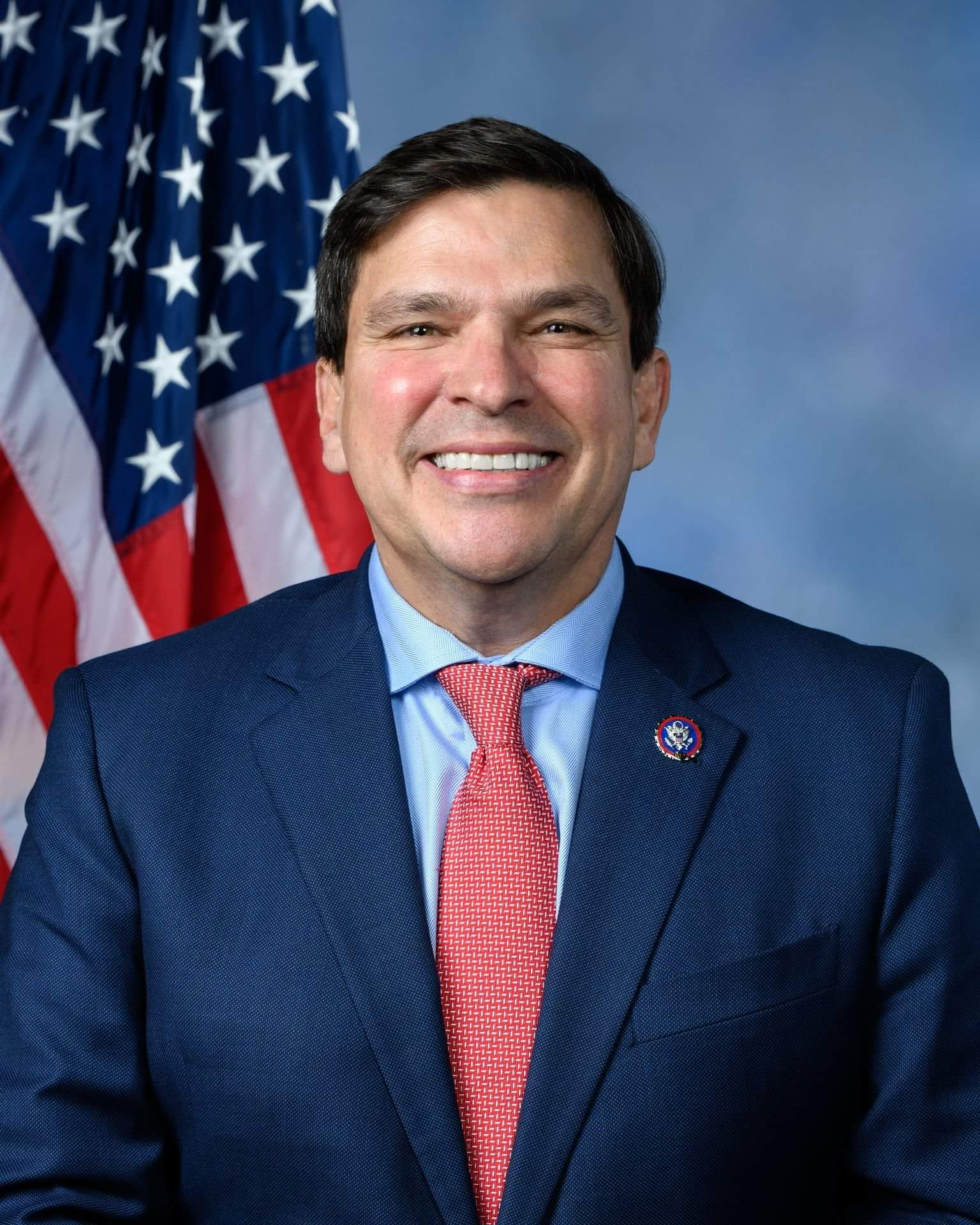
Anna Paulina Luna (left) and Vicente Gonzalez (right), the El Salvador Caucus' co-chairs

The following 16 United States representatives are members of the El Salvador Caucus:

- Andy Biggs (R, AZ-5)
- Dan Bishop (R, NC-8)
- Lauren Boebert (R, CO-3)
- Tim Burchett (R, TN-2)
- Lou Correa (D, CA-46)
- Eli Crane (R, AZ-2)
- Vicente Gonzalez (D, TX-34), co-chair
- Anna Paulina Luna (R, FL-13), co-chair
- Nancy Mace (R, SC-1)
- Cory Mills (R, FL-7)
- Alex Mooney (R, WV-2)
- Barry Moore (R, AL-2)
- Ralph Norman (R, SC-5)
- Andy Ogles (R, TN-5)
- Scott Perry (R, PA-10)
- María Elvira Salazar (R, FL-27)

=== Former members ===
- Matt Gaetz (R, FL-1), former co-chair, resigned from the United States Congress on November 13, 2024

== See also ==
- Caucuses of the United States Congress
