= Burgos Municipality =

Burgos Municipality may refer to:

- Burgos Municipality, Tamaulipas, Mexico
- Burgos, Ilocos Sur, Philippines
- Burgos, Isabela, Philippines
- Burgos, La Union, Philippines
- Burgos, Pangasinan, Philippines
