= Congressional Hispanic Caucus =

American group of legislators

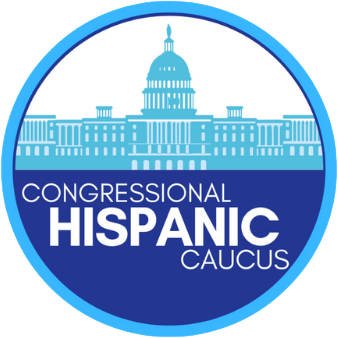
- Chair: Adriano Espaillat (NY–13)
- Founder: 5 founding members: Herman Badillo (NY-21); Baltasar Corrada del Río (PR-AL, elect); Kika de la Garza (TX-15); Henry B. González (TX-20); Edward R. Roybal (CA-15)
- Founded: December 1976; 49 years ago
- Headquarters: Washington, D.C.
- National affiliation: Democratic Party
- Seats in the House: 40 / 435 (plus 1 non-voting)
- Seats in the House Democratic Caucus: 40 / 214 (plus 1 non-voting)
- Seats in the Senate: 4 / 100

Website
- Official website

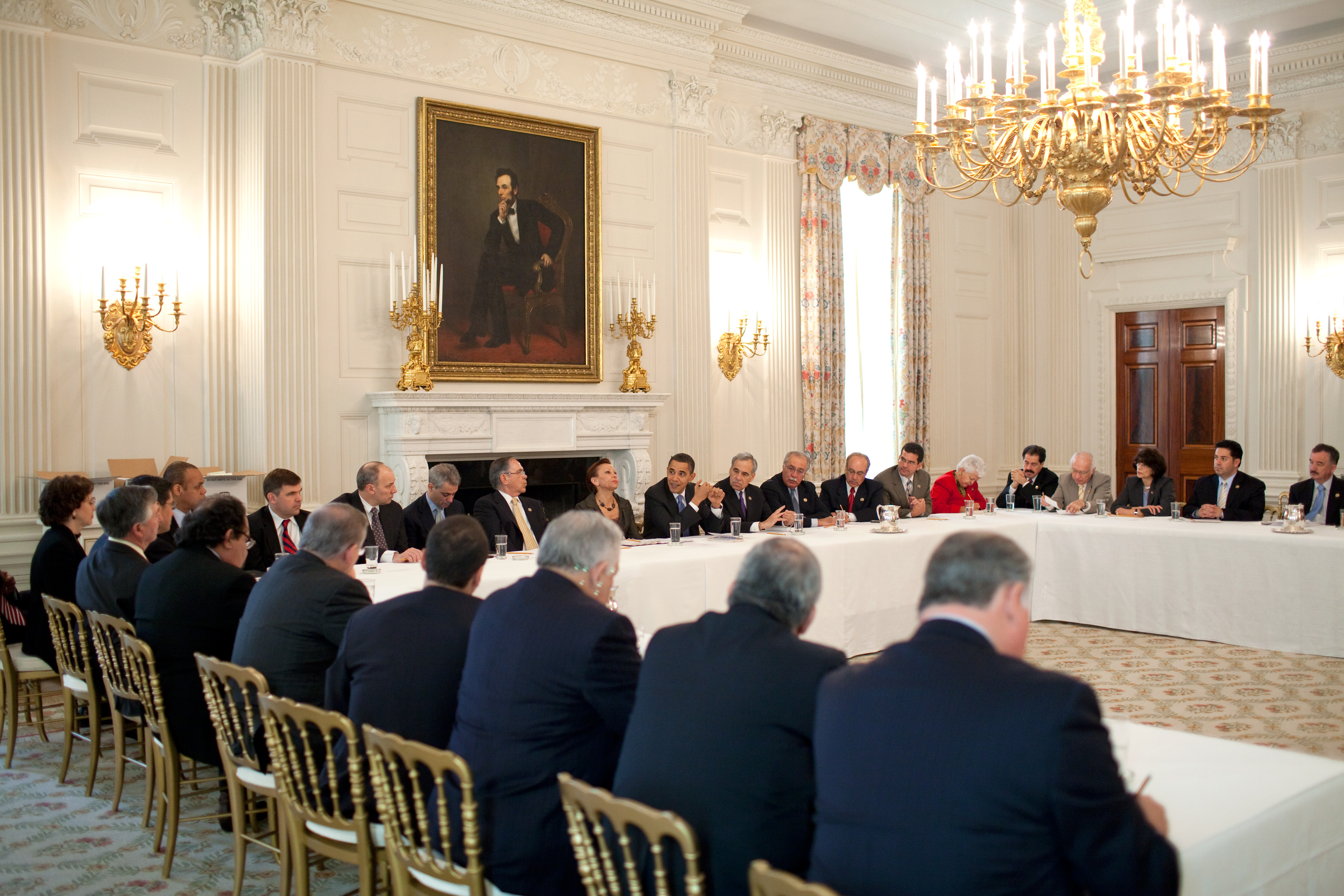
Hispanic Caucus meeting at the White House in 2009

The Congressional Hispanic Caucus (CHC) is Democratic organization of 42 U.S. Congress members of Hispanic and Latino descent. The Caucus focuses on issues affecting Hispanics and Latinos in the United States. The CHC was founded in December 1976 as a legislative service organization of the United States House of Representatives. The CHC is organized as a Congressional Member organization, governed under the Rules of the U.S. House of Representatives.

Originally founded as a bipartisan organization, the CHC lost its Republican members in the late 1990s over policy differences — chiefly U.S. policy toward Cuba. Those members formalized the split in 2003, forming the Congressional Hispanic Conference after the CHC opposed the nomination of Miguel Estrada, a Hispanic conservative, to the D.C. Circuit Court of Appeals. The caucus bylaws now explicitly block Republicans from joining, denying admission to Carlos Curbelo in 2017 and Mayra Flores in 2022.

== Purpose ==
The Congressional Hispanic Caucus aims to address national and international issues that directly impact the Hispanic community. The function of the CHC is to serve as a forum for the Hispanic Members of Congress to coalesce around a collective legislative agenda. In addition to covering legislative action, the CHC also monitors executive and judicial issues at the federal level.

Senator Catherine Cortez Masto, a Mexican American from Nevada, Senator Ben Ray Luján, a Mexican American from New Mexico, and Senator Alex Padilla, a Mexican American from California, are the current members of the Congressional Hispanic Caucus from the Senate. The remaining 38 members are from the House.

== History ==
The Congressional Hispanic Caucus (CHC) was organized in 1976 by Herman Badillo (NY-21), Baltasar Corrada del Río (PR-AL, member-elect), Kika de la Garza (TX-15), Henry B. González (TX-20) and Edward Roybal (CA-25), to serve as a legislative organization through which legislative action, as well as executive and judicial actions, could be monitored to ensure the needs of Hispanics were being met. It was staffed by Raquel Marquez Frankel, who had grown up in Silver City and Albuquerque, New Mexico, and had become, in 1947, the first Latina to attend the University of New Mexico School of Law. The goal was to work in conjunction with other groups, both inside and outside Congress, to strengthen Federal commitment to Hispanics and heighten the community's awareness of the operation and function of the American political system.

As of 2023, the CHC is composed entirely of Democrats, although at its founding it was a bipartisan organization. The Republican members left in the late 1990s over policy differences and, in 2003, formed their own group, the Congressional Hispanic Conference. In 2017, the Caucus declined to admit Rep. Carlos Curbelo, who would have been the only Republican member. In 2022, Rep. Mayra Flores, a Republican, was denied membership as well.

== Chairs ==
List of former chairs of the CHC.

Start	End	Chair	District
December 8, 1976	February 1981	Edward Roybal	CA-25
February 1981	September 1984	Bob Garcia	NY-21
September 1984	September 1985	Bill Richardson	NM-03
September 1985	September 1986	Marty Martínez	CA-30
September 1986	September 1987	Esteban Torres	CA-34
September 1987	September 1988	Albert Bustamante	TX-23
September 1988	September 1989	Jaime Fuster	PR-AL
September 1989	September 1990	Kika de la Garza	TX-15
September 1990	January 3, 1993	Solomon Ortiz	TX-27
January 3, 1993	January 3, 1995	José Serrano	NY-16
January 3, 1995	January 3, 1997	Ed Pastor	AZ-04
January 3, 1997	January 3, 1999	Xavier Becerra	CA-31
January 3, 1999	January 3, 2001	Lucille Roybal-Allard	CA-34
January 3, 2001	January 3, 2003	Silver Reyes	TX-16
January 3, 2003	January 3, 2005	Ciro Rodriguez	TX-23
January 3, 2005	January 3, 2007	Grace Napolitano	CA-38
January 3, 2007	January 3, 2009	Joe Baca	CA-43
January 3, 2009	January 3, 2011	Nydia Velázquez	NY-12
January 3, 2011	January 3, 2013	Charlie Gonzalez	TX-20
January 3, 2013	January 3, 2015	Rubén Hinojosa	TX-15
January 3, 2015	January 3, 2017	Linda Sánchez	CA-38
January 3, 2017	January 3, 2019	Michelle Lujan Grisham	NM-01
January 3, 2019	January 3, 2021	Joaquin Castro	TX-20
January 3, 2021	January 3, 2023	Raul Ruiz	CA-36
January 3, 2023	January 3, 2025	Nanette Barragán	CA-44
January 3, 2025	January 3, 2027	Adriano Espaillat	NY-13
January 3, 2027	Designate	Darren Soto	FL-09

== Current leadership ==
- Chair: Adriano Espaillat (NY-13) (D)
- Deputy Chair: Darren Soto (FL-9) (D)
- Vice Chair of Diversity & Inclusion: Joaquin Castro (TX-20) (D)
- Vice Chair of Member Engagement: Andrea Salinas (OR-6) (D)
- Vice Chair of Communications: Norma Torres (CA-35) (D)
- Vice Chair of Policy: Rob Menendez (NJ-8) (D)
- Whip: Sylvia Garcia (TX-29) (D)
- Freshman Representative: Gil Cisneros (CA-31) (D)

== Current membership (119th Congress) ==
Congressional Hispanic Caucus in the 118th United States Congress

=== United States Senate ===
Arizona:

- Ruben Gallego (D-AZ)

California:

- Alex Padilla (D-CA)

Nevada:

- Catherine Cortez Masto (D-NV)

New Mexico:

- Ben Ray Luján (D-NM)

=== United States House of Representatives ===
Arizona:

- Adelita Grijalva (AZ-07) (D)

California:

- Sam Liccardo (CA-16) (D)
- Jim Costa (CA-21) (D)
- Salud Carbajal (CA-24) (D)
- Raul Ruiz (CA-25) (D)
- Luz Rivas (CA-29) (D)
- Gil Cisneros (CA-31) (D)
- Pete Aguilar (CA-33) (D)
- Jimmy Gomez (CA-34) (D)
- Norma Torres (CA-35) (D)
- Linda Sánchez (CA-38) (D)
- Robert Garcia (CA-42) (D)
- Nanette Barragán (CA-44) (D)
- Lou Correa (CA-46) (D)
- Mike Levin (CA-49) (D)
- Juan Vargas (CA-52) (D)

Florida:

- Darren Soto (FL-9) (D)
- Maxwell Alejandro Frost (FL-10) (D)

Illinois:

- Delia Ramirez (IL-3) (D)
- Jesús "Chuy" García (IL-4) (D)

Massachusetts:

- Lori Trahan (MA-3) (D)

New Jersey:

- Rob Menendez (NJ-8) (D)
- Nellie Pou (NJ-9) (D)

New Mexico:

- Gabe Vasquez (NM-2) (D)
- Teresa Leger Fernandez (NM-3) (D)

New York:

- Nydia Velázquez (NY-7) (D)
- Adriano Espaillat (NY-13) (D)
- Alexandria Ocasio-Cortez (NY-14) (D)
- Ritchie Torres (NY-15) (D)

Oregon:

- Andrea Salinas (OR-6) (D)

Puerto Rico:

- Pablo José Hernández Rivera (PR-AL) (D)

Texas:

- Veronica Escobar (TX-16) (D)
- Joaquin Castro (TX-20) (D)
- Henry Cuellar (TX-28) (D)
- Sylvia Garcia (TX-29) (D)
- Vicente Gonzalez (TX-34) (D)
- Greg Casar (TX-35) (D)

Washington:

- Marie Gluesenkamp Perez (WA-3) (D)
- Emily Randall (WA-6) (D)

== Controversies ==
=== Joe Baca's tenure as chairman ===
On January 31, 2007, a story on the Politico.com website reported that Rep. Joe Baca had called Rep. Loretta Sanchez a "whore" in a conversation with Speaker of the California Assembly Fabian Núñez, prompting Sanchez to resign from the CHC. Rep. Baca has denied this charge, but two other CHC members, Linda Sánchez (Loretta's sister) and Hilda Solis, expressed support for Loretta Sanchez. In the case of Solis, Baca called her "a kiss-up to Speaker Nancy Pelosi," for which he apologized to Solis both privately and publicly.

A year prior to the "whore" incident, the CHC's political action committee gave $3,000 to Baca's children's campaigns for state offices in California. Although Baca recused himself from the decision to make the contributions, six members of the caucus criticized the decision, saying that CHC's PAC should support only federal candidates. Consequently, on November 15, 2006, when Joe Baca was elected chair of the CHC, Solis and the Sanchez sisters challenged his election, saying that the voting should have been done by a secret ballot.

On Monday, April 2, 2007, Congresswoman Linda Sánchez closed her offices in honor of César Estrada Chávez Day, a state holiday in California (which fell on a Saturday that year). CHC chair Baca made the following comment on Sánchez's decision to close the office: "I believe the best way to observe César Estrada Chávez Day is not by taking the day off from work or school." On April 12, Linda Sánchez announced that she had suspended her membership in the Congressional Hispanic Caucus, citing "a need for structural reforms to ensure that the caucus is more equitable and inclusive of all its members." She specifically stated that her decision "was not based on personal animus directed at Baca."

=== Other controversies ===
On June 30, 2013, Congressman Filemon Vela Jr. resigned from the CHC, citing opposition to the Senate immigration bill which the CHC endorsed, saying: "Opponents of serious immigration reform are extracting a pound of flesh in this process by conditioning a pathway to citizenship on the construction of more ineffective border fence."

In November 2017, the caucus refused to admit Republican congressman Carlos Curbelo, who would have been the only Republican in the caucus. In October 2022, it also denied admission to Republican congresswoman Mayra Flores, who was the first Mexican-born congresswoman.

== Congressional Hispanic Caucus Institute ==
In October 1981, the House Committee on House Administration drafted new regulations stipulating that fundraising activities were to be moved off all government premises. Members of the Congressional Hispanic Caucus decided to maintain a legislative support organization on Capitol Hill, the Congressional Hispanic Caucus, and moved the non-profit, fundraising organization, today known as the Congressional Hispanic Caucus Institute, Inc. to a new residence.

== CHC BOLD PAC ==
The CHC BOLD PAC (officially the Committee for Hispanic Causes-BOLD PAC and sometimes referred to as simply BOLD PAC) is the Congressional Hispanic Caucus' political arm, endorsing Democratic and especially Hispanic candidates. Ruben Gallego was the chair of the group until 2023, the current chair is Linda Sánchez. The group raised $8.7 million during the 2018 election cycle.

== Gallery ==
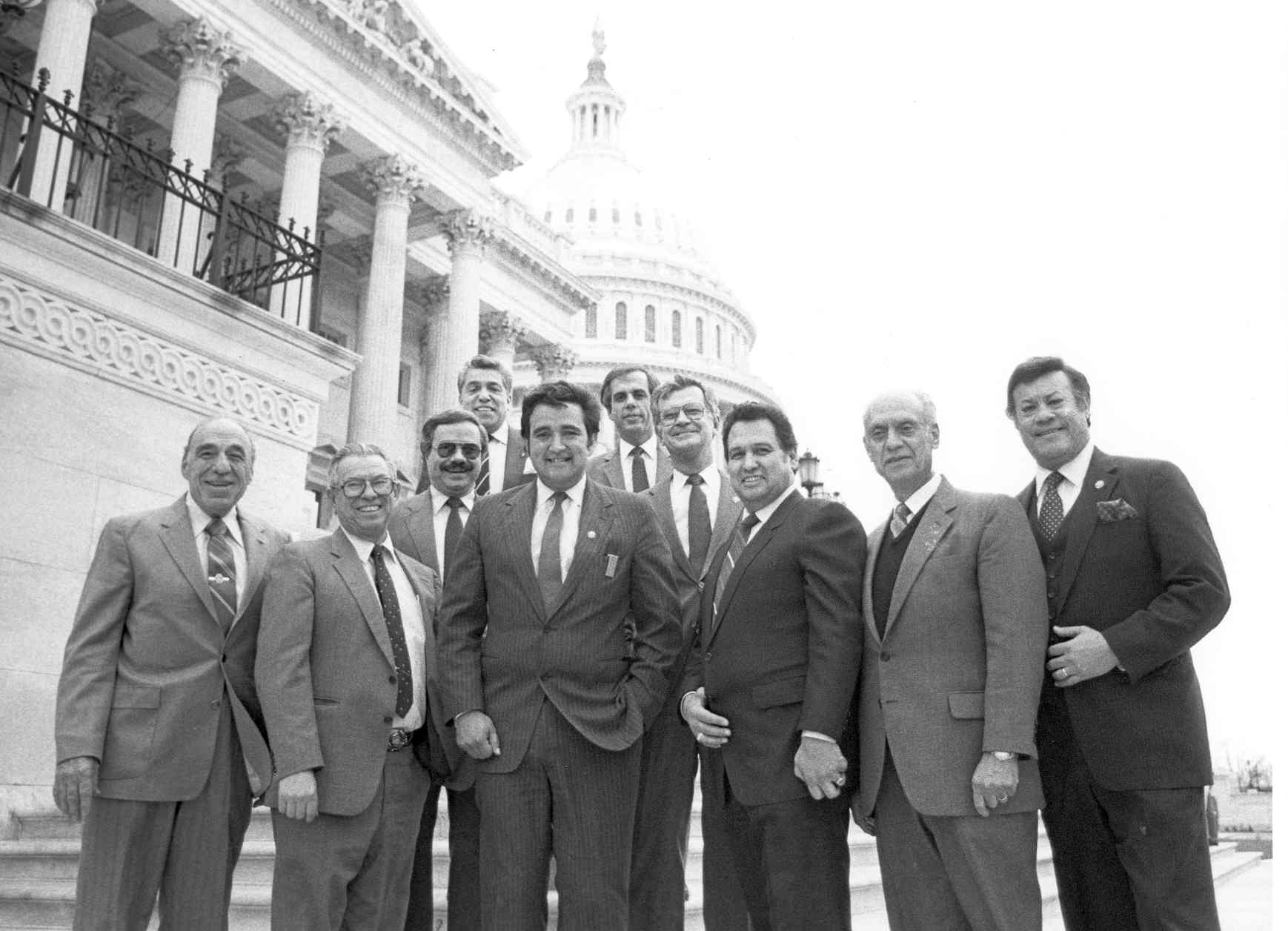
Caucus members in the mid-1980s

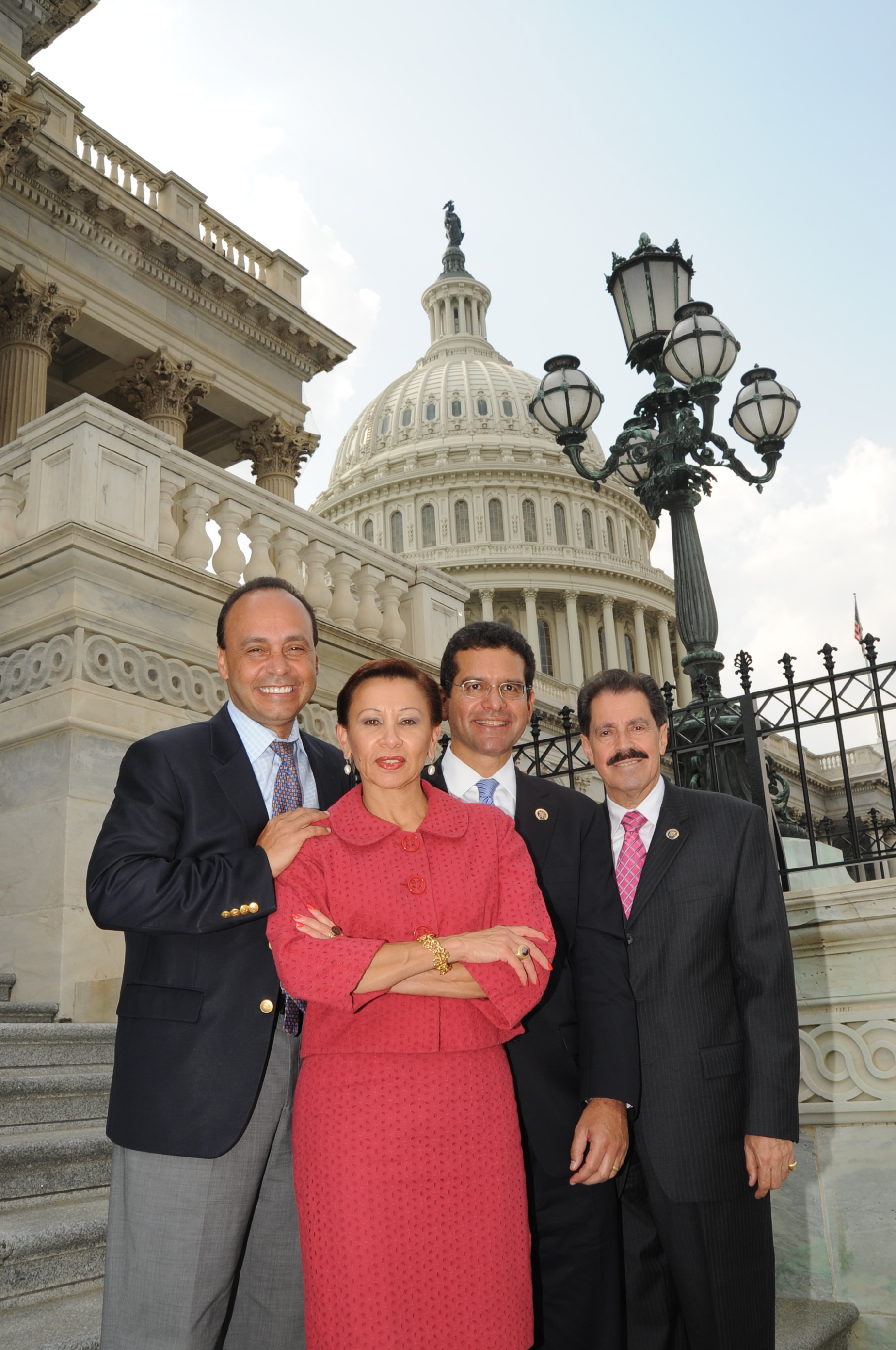
The four Puerto Rican members of the Congressional Hispanic Caucus during the Obama Administration

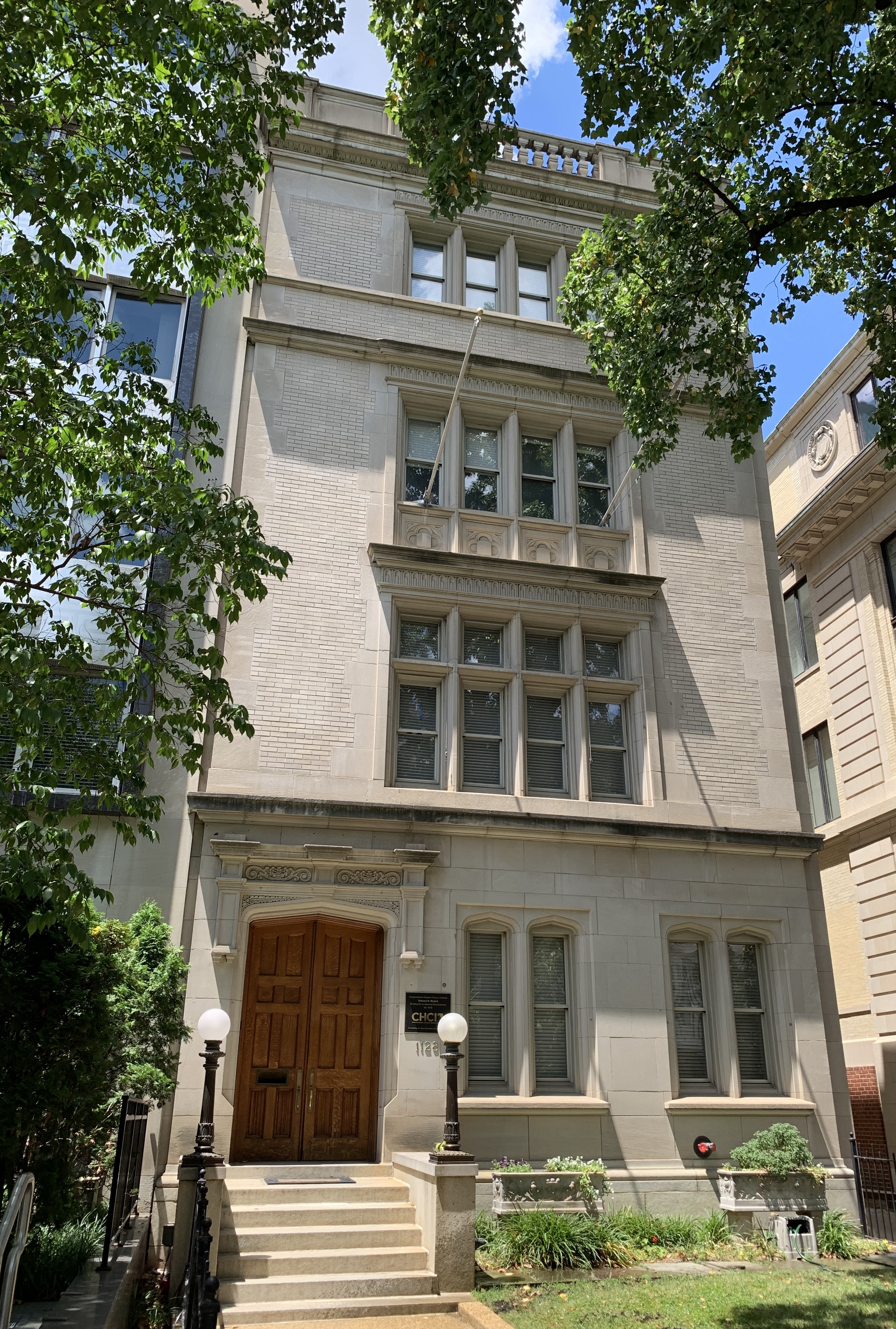
Congressional Hispanic Caucus Institute offices in Washington, D.C.

== See also ==
- List of Hispanic and Latino Americans in the United States Congress
- Congressional caucus
- Congressional Hispanic Conference
- 1977 Women's National Conference: Minority-Latino-Women
- Congressional Hispanic Caucus Institute
