= Congressional Hispanic Caucus Institute =

US nonprofit organization

- Abbreviation: CHCI
- Formation: 1978
- Type: Nonprofit foundation
- Headquarters: Washington, D.C., United States
- Chairperson: Darren Soto
- Key people: President and CEO: Marco A. Davis
- Affiliations: Congressional Hispanic Caucus
- Website: chci.org

The Congressional Hispanic Caucus Institute (CHCI) is a Hispanic nonprofit and nonpartisan 501(c)(3) leadership development organization established in 1978 by organizing members of the Congressional Hispanic Caucus (CHC) and is headquartered in Washington, D.C.

The institution is governed by voting members of its board of directors and supported by an advisory council composed of Members of Congress, corporate executives, industry experts, nonprofit leaders, and community advocates.

U.S. Representative for Florida's 9th congressional district, Representative Darren Soto, currently holds the position of CHCI Chair, and Marco A. Davis serves as president and CEO.

== History ==
In 1976, five Hispanic Members of Congress—Herman Badillo (N.Y.), Baltasar Corrada (P.R.), Eligio "Kika" de la Garza (TX), Henry B. Gonzalez (TX), and Edward Roybal (CA)—organized the Congressional Hispanic Caucus (CHC), a legislative service organization of the United States House of Representatives dedicated to issues affecting Hispanics and Latinos in the United States.

Two years later, in 1978, four members of the CHC, U.S. House of Representatives: Edward Roybal, Eligio "Kika" de la Garza, Robert “Bobby” Garcia, and Baltasar Corrada established the Congressional Hispanic Caucus Institute (CHCI), a 501(c)(3) nonprofit organization to serve as the educational arm to increase access and opportunities for the Hispanic and Latino community. In 1985, the CHCI Board of Directors was expanded from public officials to include other influential Hispanic leaders, including business executives and community advocates.

== Programs ==
Graduate Fellowship Program
The CHCI Graduate Fellowship Program is a paid, nine-month fellowship based in Washington, D.C. for Latino leaders interested in a specific public policy area including K-12 education, health, housing, law, and energy.

As part of the program, participants research a public policy issue that relates to Hispanic Americans in their particular area of academics and develop an analytical policy paper read during the Policy Briefing Series on Capitol Hill. Based on the topic, fellows will organize the briefing, identify relevant subject matter experts to serve as panelists, and moderate the session.

Public Policy Fellowship Program
The Public Policy Fellowship Program is a paid nine-month fellowship based in Washington, D.C., for recent Latino college graduates pursuing a career in public policy. Participants work to understand policy issues facing the Latino community and how to propose effective solutions in legislation across entities such as congressional offices, federal agencies, national nonprofit advocacy organizations, and government-related institutes.

Congressional Internship Program
The Congressional Internship Program consists of paid summer and semester internships in Washington, D.C., for Latino undergraduate students interested in working in legislation and congressional offices.

R2L NextGen
Through the CHCI R2L NextGen program, Latino high school students participate in a week-long all-expenses-paid training in Washington, D.C.

== Events ==
Hispanic Heritage Month Events
Each year CHCI hosts a week of leadership events and celebrations in Washington D.C., kicking-off National Hispanic Heritage Month with a two-day Leadership Conference and Annual Awards Gala. Members of Congress, corporate executives, community activists, educators, celebrities, media personalities, nonprofit leaders, CHCI program participants, and CHCI alumni all come together to examine the critical issues affecting the Latino community and the nation. During the Annual Awards Gala, industry and community trailblazers are recognized and honored with the CHCI Medallion of Excellence award. The qualifying factor is philanthropic and civic engagement.

== See also ==
- Congressional Black Caucus Foundation
