= Mayra Flores =

Mexican-American politician (born 1986)

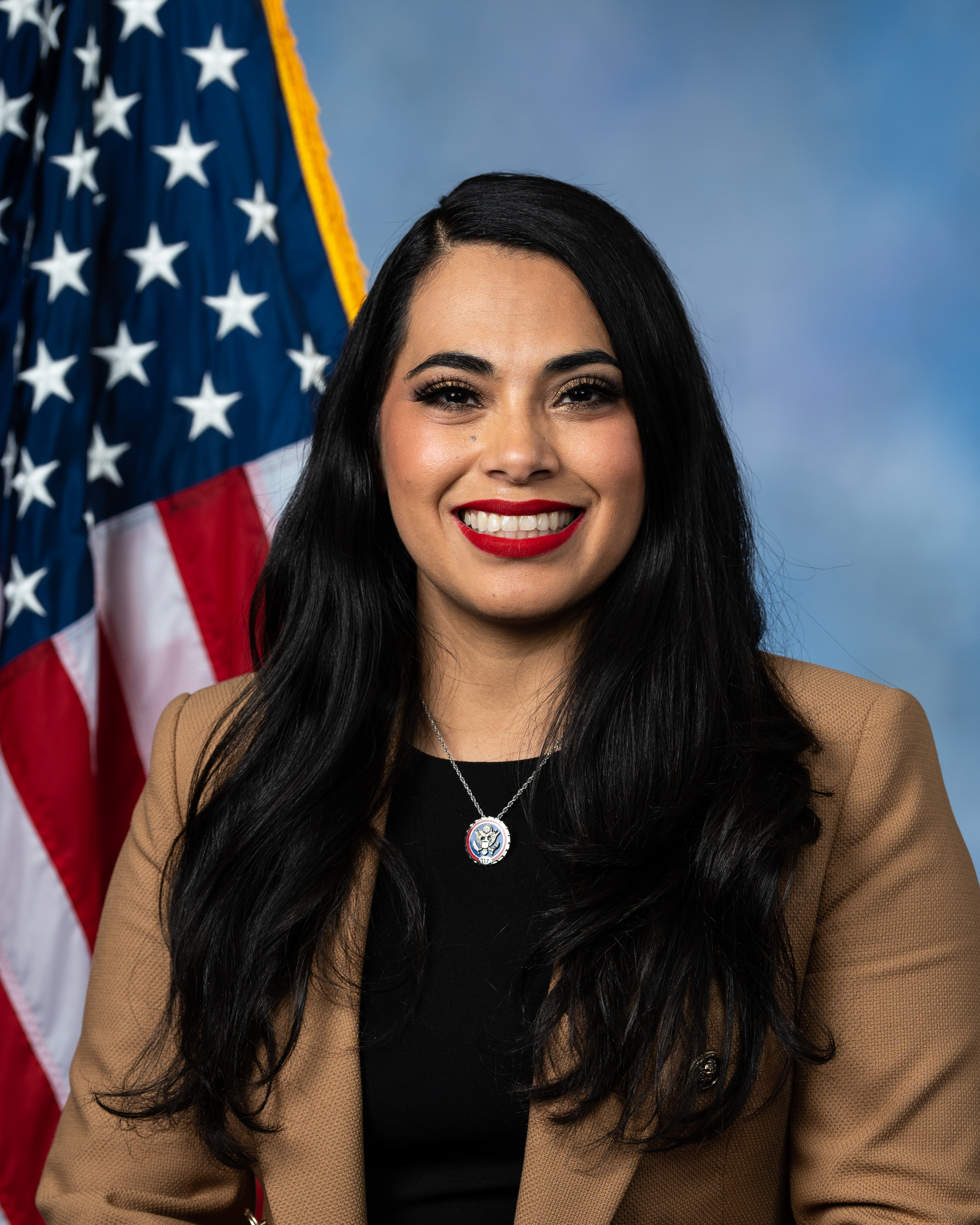
- Official portrait, 2022

Member of the U.S. House of Representatives from Texas's 34th district
- In office June 14, 2022 – January 3, 2023 (Note: Flores's official service begins on the date of the special election, while she was not sworn in until June 21, 2022.)
- Preceded by: Filemon Vela Jr.
- Succeeded by: Vicente Gonzalez (redistricted)

Personal details
- Born: Mayra Nohemi Flores; January 1, 1986 (age 40) Burgos, Mexico
- Party: Democratic (before 2008); Republican (2008–present)
- Spouse: John Vallejo (div. 2025)
- Children: 4
- Education: South Texas College (BAS)

Mayra Nohemi Flores (born January 1, 1986) is an American politician who represented Texas's 34th congressional district in the United States House of Representatives from 2022 to 2023. A member of the Republican Party, she was the first female Mexican-born member of the House.

Flores was born in Burgos, Tamaulipas, Mexico; her family moved to the United States when she was six years old before she gained citizenship at age 14. She graduated from San Benito High School and South Texas College. Before her congressional campaign, she worked as a respiratory therapist and as chair of Hispanic outreach for the Hidalgo County Republican Party. In June 2022, a special election in Texas's 34th congressional district was held after Democratic Representative Filemon Vela Jr. resigned. Flores won the election, defeating three other candidates.

Flores lost her campaign for a full term in the November 2022 midterm elections to Democrat Vicente Gonzalez in the district that was redrawn that year. In 2024, Flores challenged Gonzalez again, but narrowly lost the general election. In 2026, Flores ran again, but lost the district's Republican primary.

== Early life and education ==
Mayra Nohemi Flores was born on January 1, 1986, in Burgos, Tamaulipas, Mexico, to migrant farmworkers. Her family moved to the U.S. when she was six years old and she gained citizenship at 14. She graduated from San Benito High School in 2004. Her family often moved yearly throughout Texas during her childhood because of her and her parents' work picking cotton, which began in Memphis, Texas, when she was 13. She graduated from South Texas College in 2019.

== Early political career ==
Flores's parents supported the Democratic Party, but she was drawn to the Republican Party due to her anti-abortion views. She has said that she was previously a Democrat, but left the party shortly after voting for Barack Obama in the 2008 presidential election.

Before her congressional campaigns and shortly after graduating from college, Flores worked in the Hidalgo County Republican Party as chair of Hispanic outreach. In 2022, she organized pro-Trump caravans through the Rio Grande Valley. Before her election to Congress, Flores used hashtags associated with the QAnon conspiracy theory on an Instagram post, though she has denied ever being a supporter of QAnon. In tweets that she later deleted, Flores also promoted the false claim that the 2021 United States Capitol attack was "set up" by antifa members among the crowd during the riot.

== U.S. House of Representatives ==
=== Elections ===
==== 2022 special ====
Flores declared her candidacy for the United States House of Representatives in Texas's 34th congressional district after incumbent Democratic representative Filemon Vela Jr. announced in March 2021 that he would not seek reelection in 2022. She ran her campaign appealing to Hispanic and Latino Americans and their disillusionment with the Democratic Party, which they have historically supported in South Texas. Following the establishment of new congressional districts as a part of the 2020 redistricting cycle, incumbent Democrat Vicente Gonzalez of the 15th district announced his candidacy for the new 34th district. On March 1, 2022, Flores and Gonzalez won their respective partisan primaries and faced each other in the general election on November 8, 2022.

In March 2022, Vela announced his early resignation from Congress. Shortly after his announcement, Flores declared her candidacy in the special election on June 14, 2022, to fill the vacancy. Gonzalez did not run in the special election. Flores's campaign focused on her family, the economy, border security, and her upbringing as the daughter of immigrants. During the special election, Flores reported $752,000 in contributions, while Democrat Dan Sanchez of Harlingen reported $46,000. Turnout was incredibly low at only 7.3% of registered voters participating in the election. Flores defeated Sanchez with 50.91% of the vote to Sanchez's 43.37%, avoiding a runoff. She is the first Mexican-born woman elected to serve in Congress.

==== 2022 general ====
In her general election campaign against Democrat Vincente Gonzalez, Flores was targeted with racist and sexist comments; a blogger who had previously received funds from the Gonzalez campaign called her "Miss Frijoles", "Miss Enchiladas", and a "cotton-pickin' liar". Gonzalez and district Democrats condemned these comments. Gonzalez also called Flores "unqualified" and claimed she could not "think or speak for herself", criticisms that were called sexist.

In the November 8 general election, Gonzalez defeated Flores 53% to 44%, to become the next Representative for the 34th District.

==== 2024 ====
On July 11, 2023, Flores announced a campaign to retake the 34th district in the 2024 election.

In what the Texas Tribune called "a bizarre micro-scandal", in January 2024 Flores was accused by a social media user of stealing photos of food and presenting them as her own on her campaign's social media accounts. Flores initially blocked critics and changed the name of her social media account, but later said she had "no intention to mislead" and that the photos reminded her of her childhood upbringing in Mexico.

Flores prevailed in a contested primary election on March 5, 2024. She received millions of dollars of campaign funding from other House Republicans and increased Republican voter turnout, but lost the election against incumbent Democrat Vicente Gonzalez in the November general election by 5,137 votes, 51.3% to 48.7% . Flores campaigned in churches in a potential violation of federal regulations.

==== 2026 ====
On April 15, 2025, Flores announced that she would challenge Democratic Representative Henry Cuellar in Texas's 28th congressional district. However, she switched her bid back to Texas's 34th congressional district in August 2025 after redistricting made the district more favorable for Republicans.

=== Tenure ===
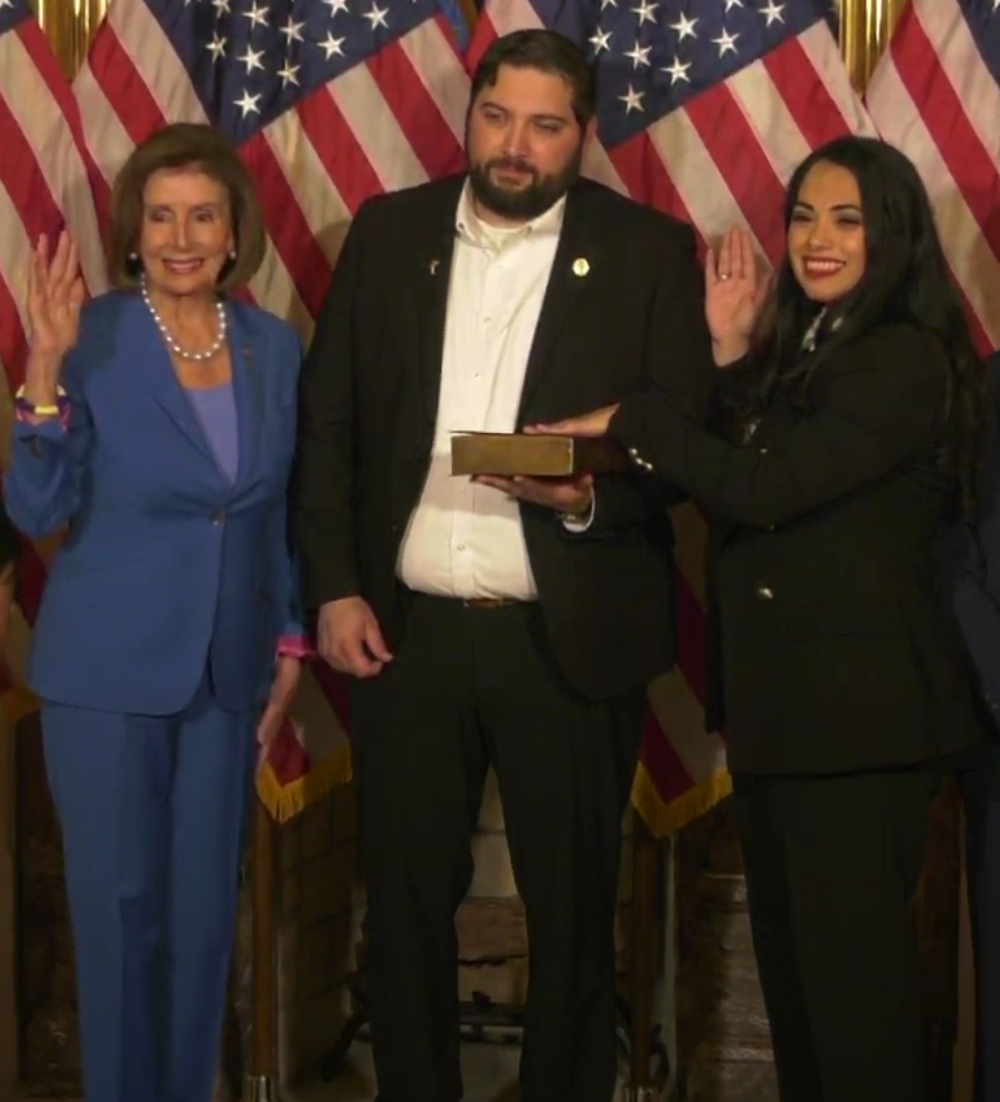
House Speaker Nancy Pelosi (left) swears in Flores, as her husband looks on

Flores was sworn in by Speaker of the House Nancy Pelosi on June 21, 2022. Three days later, Flores spoke out about the Supreme Court opinion in Dobbs v. Jackson Women's Health Organization which overturned Roe v. Wade, calling the decision a "big win" and a "dream come true".

In June 2022, Flores voted against the Bipartisan Safer Communities Act.

In July 2022, The New York Times published an article about Flores's election, calling her a "far-right Latina". Flores responded to the article, saying The New York Times knew "nothing about me or our culture" and that "I have received only hate from the liberal media". The article was also criticized by Ted Cruz and Laura Ingraham, among others.

On July 19, 2022, Flores voted against the Respect for Marriage Act.

=== Political positions ===
Flores supports religious freedom, school choice, and abortion bans. She opposes same-sex marriage. She backed former President Trump publicly and raised doubts about the results of the 2020 election.

=== Committee assignments ===
Flores' committee assignments included:

- Committee on Homeland Security
  - Subcommittee on Border Security, Facilitation, & Operations
  - Subcommittee on Transportation & Maritime Security
- Committee on Agriculture

== Personal life ==
Flores has worked as a respiratory therapist. She was married to John Vallejo, a U.S. Border Patrol agent, with whom she has four children. Flores announced in June 2025 that she and Vallejo had divorced earlier in the year, due to "irreconcilable differences."

== Electoral history ==
=== 2022 ===
2022 Texas's 34th congressional district special election results
| Party | Candidate | Votes | % |
|---|---|---|---|
| Republican | Mayra Flores | 14,799 | 50.91 |
| Democratic | Dan Sanchez | 12,606 | 43.37 |
| Democratic | Rene Coronado | 1,210 | 4.16 |
| Republican | Juana Cantu-Cabrera | 454 | 1.56 |
| Total votes | | 29,069 | 100.00 |
| Registered electors | | 395,025 | |
| Republican gain from Democratic | | | |

2022 Texas's 34th congressional district Republican primary results
| Party | Candidate | Votes | % |
|---|---|---|---|
| Republican | Mayra Flores | 9,490 | 60.4 |
| Republican | Frank McCaffrey | 3,444 | 21.9 |
| Republican | Gregory Kunkle | 1,677 | 10.7 |
| Republican | Juana Cantu-Cabrera | 1,115 | 7.1 |
| Total votes | | 15,726 | 100.0 |

2022 Texas's 34th congressional district general election results
| Party | Candidate | Votes | % |
|---|---|---|---|
| Democratic | Vicente Gonzalez (incumbent) | 70,759 | 52.7 |
| Republican | Mayra Flores (incumbent) | 59,404 | 44.3 |
| Independent | Chris Royal | 4,076 | 3.0 |
| Total votes | | 134,239 | 100 |
| Democratic gain from Republican | | | |

=== 2024 ===
2024 Texas's 34th congressional district Republican primary results
| Party | Candidate | Votes | % |
|---|---|---|---|
| Republican | Mayra Flores | 18,307 | 81.2 |
| Republican | Laura Cisneros | 1,991 | 8.8 |
| Republican | Mauro Garza | 1,388 | 6.2 |
| Republican | Gregory Kunkle | 863 | 3.8 |
| Total votes | | 22,549 | 100.0 |

2024 Texas's 34th congressional district general election results
| Party | Candidate | Votes | % |
|---|---|---|---|
| Democratic | Vicente Gonzalez (incumbent) | 102,780 | 51.3% |
| Republican | Mayra Flores | 97,603 | 48.7% |
| Total votes | | 200,283 | 100.0% |
| Democratic hold | | | |

=== 2026 ===
2026 Texas's 34th congressional district Republican primary results
| Party | Candidate | Votes | % |
|---|---|---|---|
| Republican | Eric Flores | 20,685 | 56.6 |
| Republican | Mayra Flores | 8,644 | 23.7 |
| Republican | Luis Buentello | 1,942 | 5.3 |
| Republican | Scott Mandel | 1,635 | 4.5 |
| Republican | Fred Hinojosa | 1,392 | 3.8 |
| Republican | Keith Allen | 1,374 | 3.8 |
| Republican | Gregory Kunkle | 689 | 1.9 |
| Republican | Jay Nagy | 159 | 0.4 |
| Total votes | | 36,520 | 100.0 |

== See also ==
- List of Hispanic and Latino Americans in the United States Congress
- Women in the United States House of Representatives

U.S. House of Representatives
| Preceded by Filemon Vela Jr. | Member of the U.S. House of Representatives from Texas's 34th congressional district 2022–2023 | Succeeded by Vicente Gonzalez |
U.S. order of precedence (ceremonial)
| Preceded by Shelley Sekula-Gibbs as Former U.S. Representative | Order of precedence of the United States as Former U.S. Representative | Succeeded by Erica Lee Carter as Former U.S. Representative |
