= Vicente Gonzalez (American politician) =

American politician (born 1967)

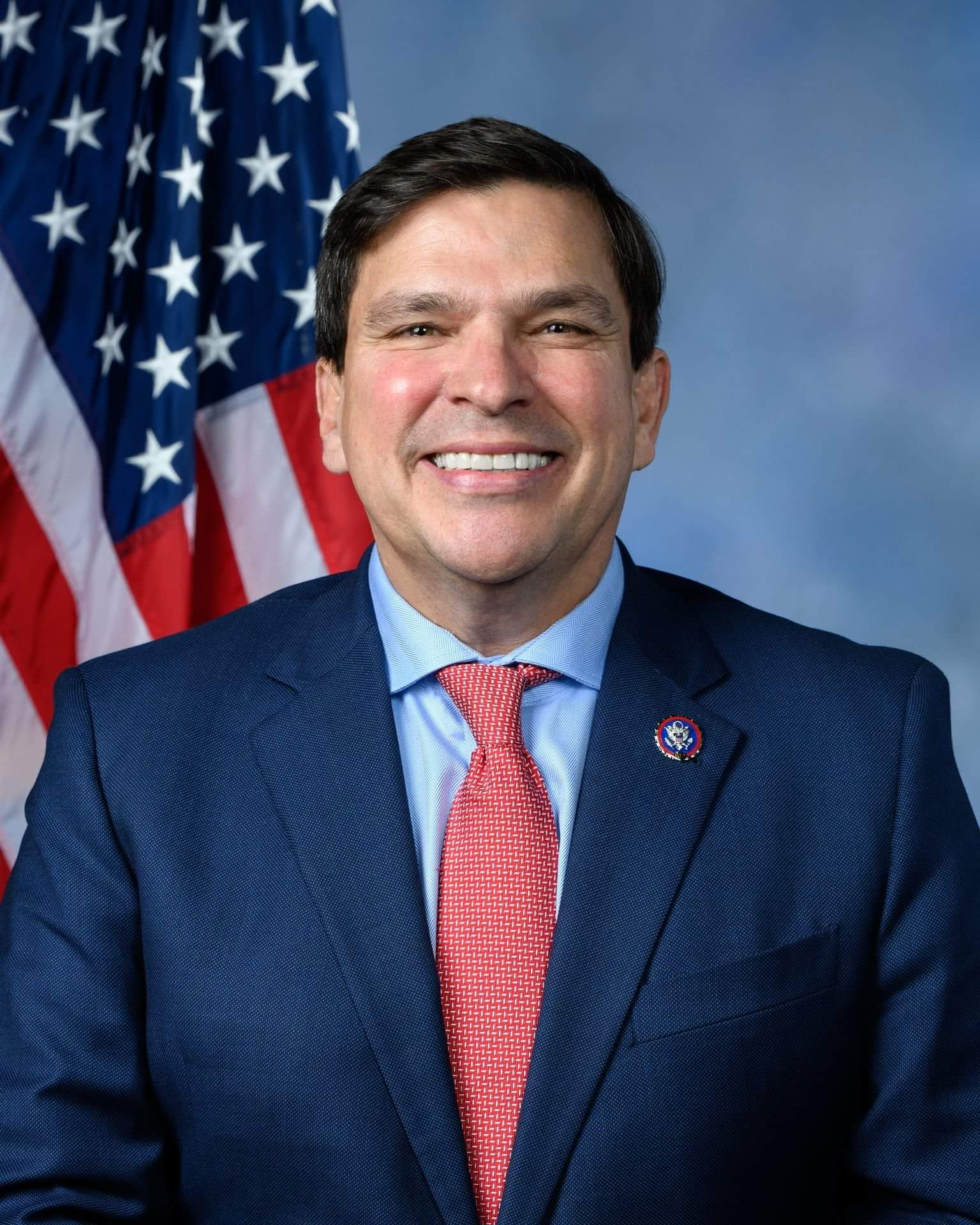
- Official portrait, 2023

Member of the U.S. House of Representatives from Texas
- Incumbent
- Assumed office January 3, 2017
- Preceded by: Rubén Hinojosa
- Constituency: 15th district (2017–2023); 34th district (2023–present)

Personal details
- Born: September 4, 1967 (age 59) Corpus Christi, Texas, U.S.
- Party: Democratic
- Spouse: Lorena Saenz
- Education: Del Mar College (AS); Embry-Riddle Aeronautical University, Corpus Christi (BS); Texas Wesleyan University (JD)
- Website: House website Campaign website

Vicente Gonzalez Jr. (/vɪˈsɛnteɪ/; born September 4, 1967) is an American lawyer and politician who has served as the U.S. representative for Texas's 34th congressional district since 2023. A member of the Democratic Party, he previously represented Texas's 15th congressional district from 2017 to 2023. His South Texas district extends along the Gulf Coast from Brownsville, on the Mexican border, to Corpus Christi.

Born in Corpus Christi, Texas, Gonzalez earned a Juris Doctor from Texas Wesleyan University School of Law and established a private law practice. He was first elected to Congress in 2016 following the retirement of longtime representative Rubén Hinojosa. After redistricting based on the 2020 census, he ran in the newly configured 34th district and defeated Republican nominee Mayra Flores in 2022.

Gonzalez is considered a conservative Democrat and serves as co-chair of the Blue Dog Coalition. During his tenure in Congress, he has participated in bipartisan negotiations and has, on several occasions, voted with Republicans on legislation, including firearms and transgender-related policies.

== Early life and education ==
Gonzalez was born on September 4, 1967, in Corpus Christi, Texas. His father was a merchant seaman who served in the Korean War. His mother was born and raised in Mexico. He went to Roman Catholic School in Corpus Christi for part of his childhood. In his junior year, he dropped out of high school but later earned his high school equivalency (GED) certificate in 1985.

Gonzalez afterwards enrolled at Del Mar College, obtaining an associate degree in banking and finance in 1990. He continued his education at Embry–Riddle Aeronautical University on the Corpus Christi Naval Air Station, where he earned a Bachelor of Science degree in aviation business administration in 1992.

In 1996, Gonzalez received a Juris Doctor from the Texas Wesleyan University School of Law. During law school, Gonzalez interned for Congressman Solomon P. Ortiz. The following year, he established his law practice, V. Gonzalez & Associates.

== U.S. House of Representatives ==
=== Elections ===
==== 2016 ====
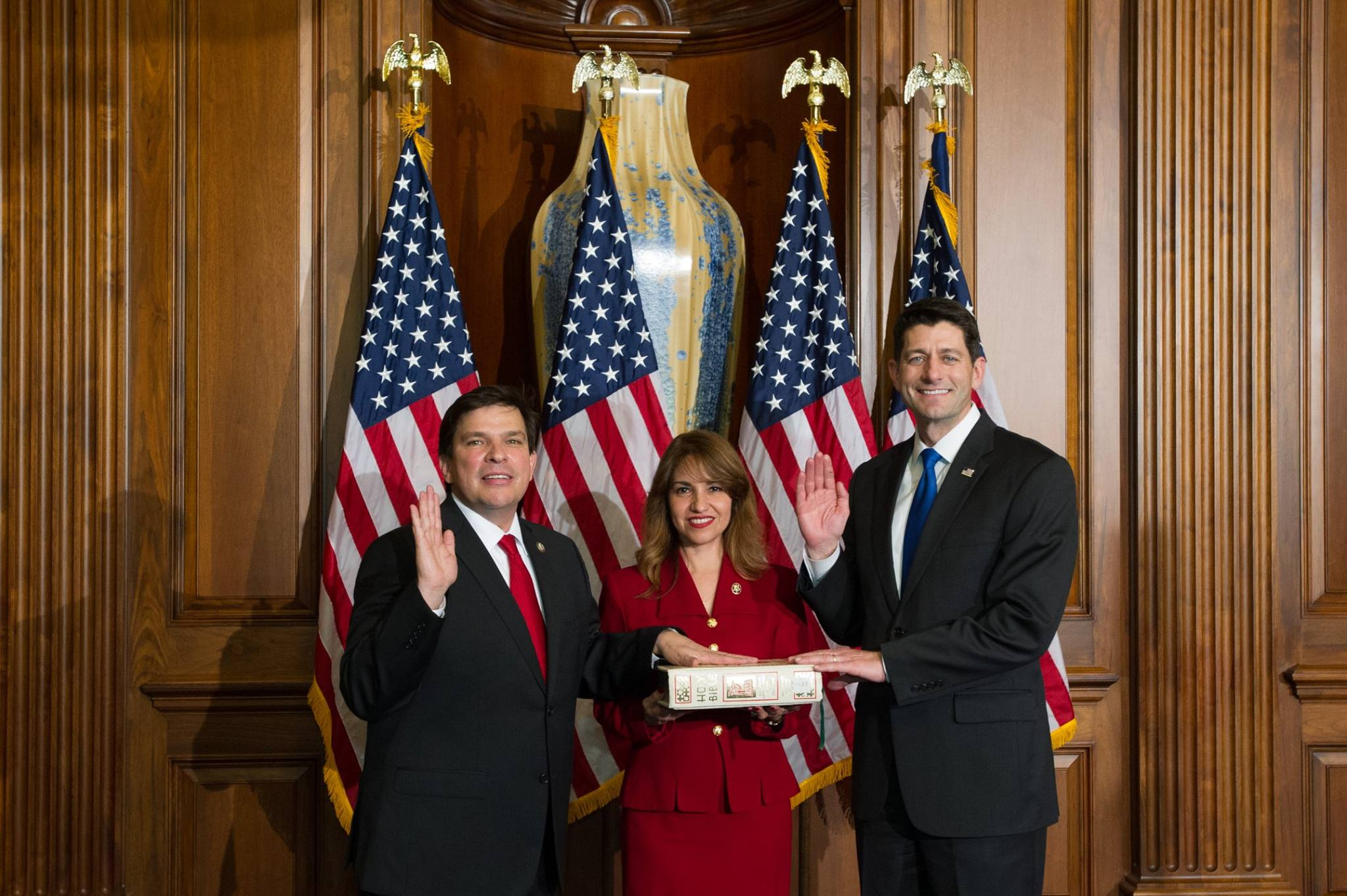
Gonzalez being sworn into the 115th Congress, 2017

Gonzalez, a political newcomer, announced his candidacy for the U.S. House of Representatives in Texas's 15th congressional district in 2016 following the retirement of incumbent Rubén Hinojosa. He secured the Democratic nomination by defeating Sonny Palacios in a runoff election. In the November general election, Gonzalez won with 57.3% of the vote, defeating Republican nominee Tim Westley, who received 37.7%.

==== 2018 ====
Gonzalez sought reelection in 2018 and faced a rematch against Republican Tim Westley. He won a second term with 59.7% of the vote to Westley's 38.7%.

==== 2020 ====
After the Murder of George Floyd, in June 2020, Gonzalez attended the private funeral of George Floyd at the Fountain of Praise church in Houston. In an interview at the funeral, Gonzalez called for the nation to focus on systemic racism and police reform saying that deaths of black people in police custody happen "way too often, and not enough is said about it." He also said that the vast majority of police are good and well respected by the community.

In 2020, Gonzalez's seat became unexpectedly competitive. He faced Republican challenger Monica De La Cruz and secured reelection by a much narrower margin than in his previous campaigns, winning with 50.5% of the vote to De La Cruz's 47.6%.

==== 2022 ====
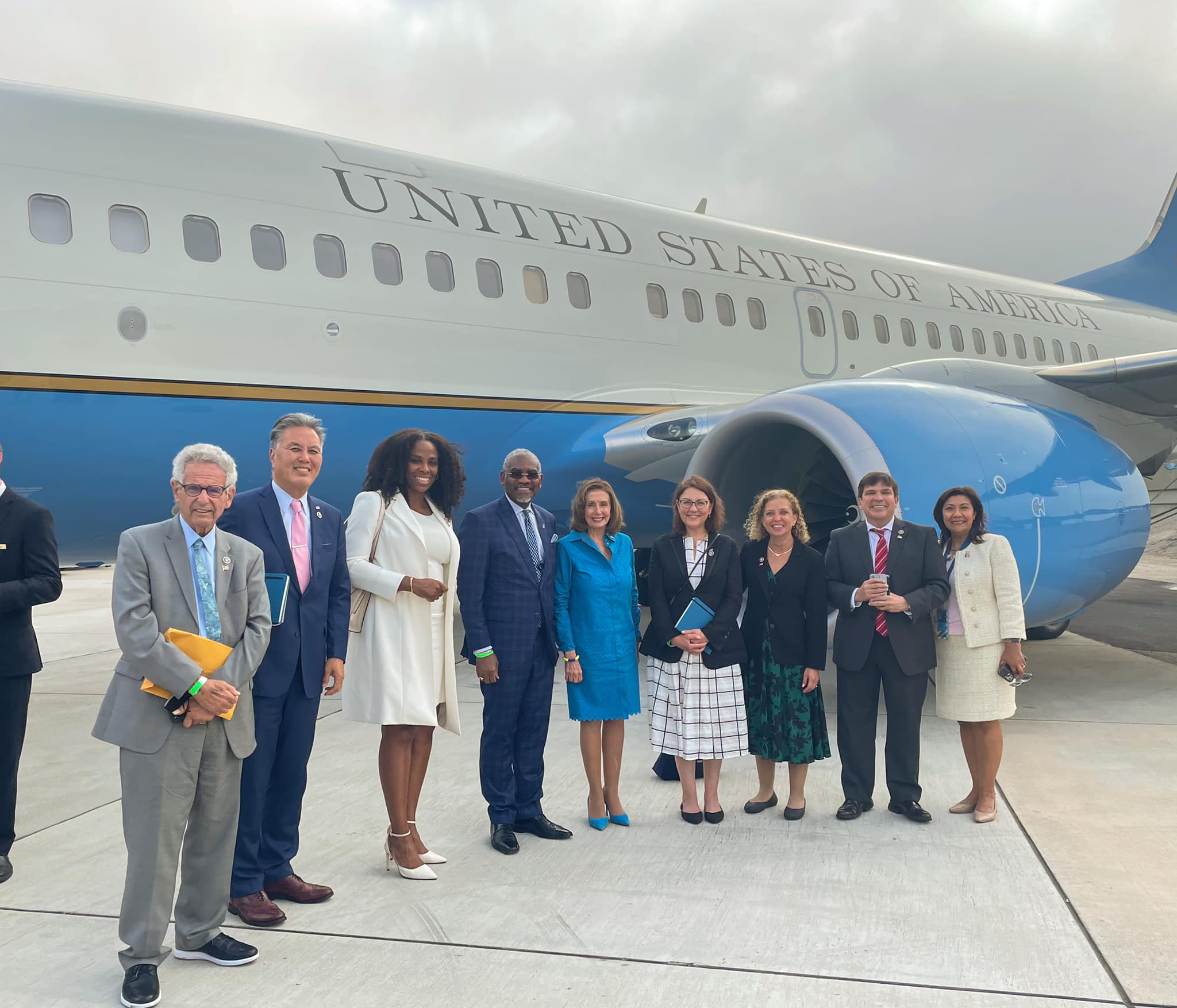
Gonzalez arrives with select House members for the 9th Summit of the Americas in Los Angeles in 2022.

Following Texas's redistricting based on the 2020 census, Gonzalez announced in November 2021 that he would seek reelection in the newly redrawn 34th congressional district. The 15th district, which he previously represented, had become more favorable to Republicans, while the neighboring 34th became more Democratic-leaning. The Texas legislature also placed Gonzalez's residence within the 34th district's boundaries. The incumbent representative, Filemon Vela Jr., had previously announced that he would not seek reelection and endorsed Gonzalez regardless of which district he chose to run in.

Gonzalez secured the Democratic nomination in the March 2022 primary, while Republicans nominated Mayra Flores. Soon after, Vela resigned from Congress on March 31, triggering a special election to fill the remainder of his term under the district's previous, more competitive boundaries. Gonzalez declined to run in the special election and instead endorsed Democrat Dan Sanchez. Flores, however, entered the race and won the June 14 special election with 50.9% of the vote to Sanchez's 43.4%, briefly flipping the seat for Republicans. Gonzalez and Flores then faced each other in the regular November 8 general election, where Gonzalez won and reclaimed the seat for the Democrats. In the same election cycle, Gonzalez's 2020 opponent, Monica De La Cruz, ran in and won the redrawn 15th district, making her his successor in that district.

During the campaign, a blogger who received campaign funds from Gonzalez attacked Flores by calling her "Miss Frijoles" and "Miss Enchiladas". He accused her of "playing the race card" and called her a "cotton pickin' liar" for having worked in cotton fields with her immigrant parents as a child. Gonzalez said he had never read the blog and was unaware of the blogger's racist commentary, and committed not to give any more campaign money to the blog.

==== 2024 ====
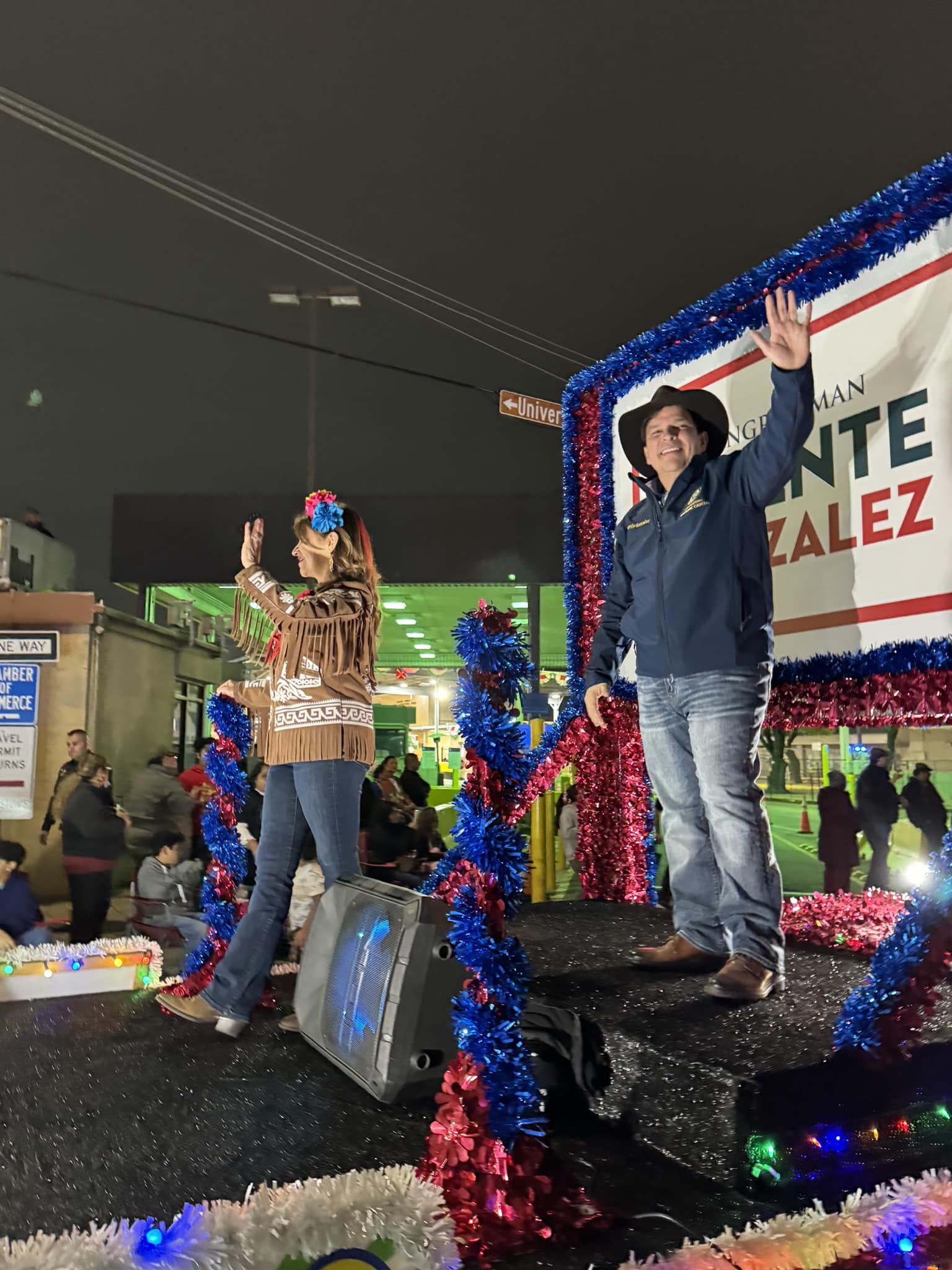
Gonzalez campaigns in Brownsville, 2024

Gonzalez was re-elected in 2024. He faced no opposition in the Democratic primary. He ran against Republican nominee Mayra Flores in the November 2024 general election in a rematch of their 2022 contest.

Before the Republican primary election, Gonzalez' campaign targeted the weaker primary candidate, Greg Kunkle, in hopes he would become the nominee and make Gonzalez' path to re-election easier.

During the campaign, Gonzalez compared Hispanic Trump supporters to "Jews for Hitler," prompting criticism from Republicans in his mostly Hispanic South Texas district. Gonzalez stood by his comments saying, "I don't understand how Mexican Americans can vote for Trump. It's clearly a vote against self interest. And yes it would be like the Jewish community voting for Hitler before the atrocities he caused. That would never happen. And Latinos need [to] wake up and see a tyrant on the horizon."

=== Tenure ===
Gonzalez was sworn into office on January 3, 2017. In January 2019, Gonzalez joined fellow members of the Problem Solvers Caucus in meeting with President Donald Trump in an effort to resolve the 2018–2019 United States federal government shutdown, although the effort did not succeed. In January 2020, Gonzalez received the Order of the Quetzal.

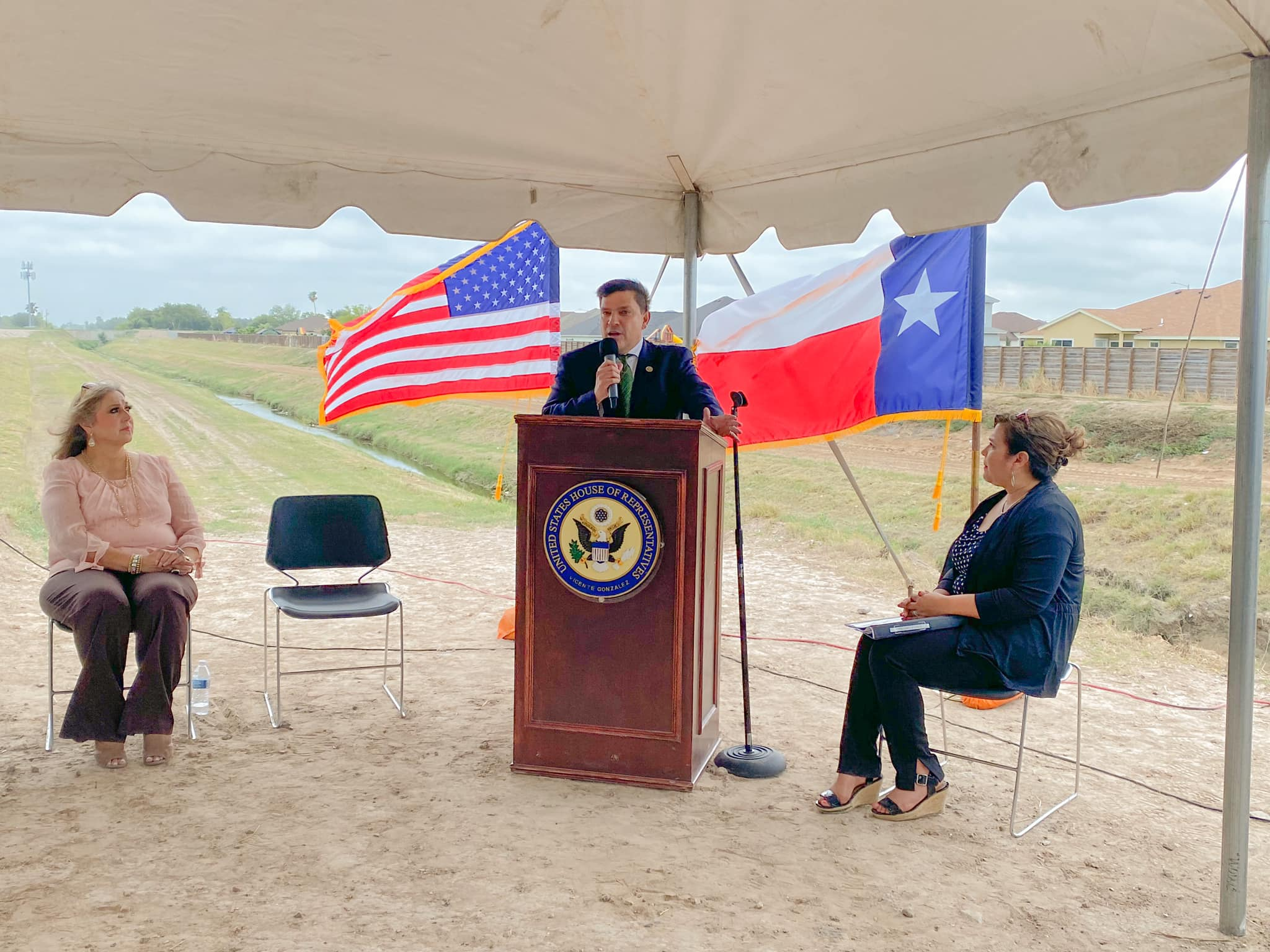
Gonzalez discusses funding from the bipartisan infrastructure bill for the north drain expansion project in Hidalgo County, 2022

In August 2021, he was among a group of conservative Democrats, known as "The Unbreakable Nine," who opposed supporting the Biden administration's $3.5 trillion budget reconciliation package unless the Infrastructure Investment and Jobs Act was passed. In July 2022, he joined the Republicans and four other Democrats in voting against a bill to ban assault weapons. The Lugar Center later ranked him among the top 50 most bipartisan members of Congress during the 118th Congress session.

During the 2024 presidential election, Gonzalez aired television advertisements in his district opposing the participation of trans women in women's sports. After the election, he criticized his party and said that he would not take their advice. He called for the Democratic operative responsible for pro-choice ads in his district to be fired. He also said Democrats were "lazy" and "out of touch" on abortion issues and urged the party to soften its support for transgender rights. In 2025, he was one of two House Democrats, along with Henry Cuellar, to vote in favor of the Protection of Women and Girls in Sports Act, which seeks to prohibit transgender female athletes from competing in women's and girls' sports at federally funded educational institutions, and later that year he voted to ban gender affirming for transgender minors, and criminalize anyone who assists in them in obtaining it. In 2026, Gonzalez was one of eight Democrats to join Republicans in passing the Stopping Indoctrination and Protecting Kids Act, which mandated that transgender youth be outed to their parents by school professionals, and which would bar schools from teaching about any concept related to transgender topics.

Gonzalez was among 46 House Democrats who joined Republicans in supporting the Laken Riley Act.

Gonzalez is the co-chair of the El Salvador congressional caucus along with Republican Anna Paulina Luna and has promoted El Salvador's authoritarian president, Nayib Bukele. His admiration of Bukele has sparked criticism due to Bukele's role in the deportation of Venezuelans to El Salvador.

On January 22, 2026, he was one of seven House Democrats who voted to pass HR 7147 which provided funding for the Department of Homeland Security through the end of Fiscal Year 2026 and included funding for United States Immigration and Customs Enforcement (ICE). The vote came two weeks after an ICE officer fatally shot Renée Good in Minneapolis. Two days after the vote, a Border Patrol agent killed Alex Pretti in Minneapolis, prompting public backlash against Democrats who had supported the funding. Gonzalez posted a video on social media stating "Let me make it clear: it was not to fund ICE," claiming he voted for the bill to ensure funding for other agencies serving South Texas such as FEMA and the Coast Guard.

In June 2026, he was one of 10 House Democrats to sign onto the pro-capitalist, anti-socialist initiative, Promise to America, after three candidates backed by the Democratic Socialists of America won Democratic congressional primaries.

In September 2026, Gonzalez voted for a resolution which denounced socialism and the Democratic Socialists of America, and called for the passage of the SAVE America Act.

=== Committee assignments ===
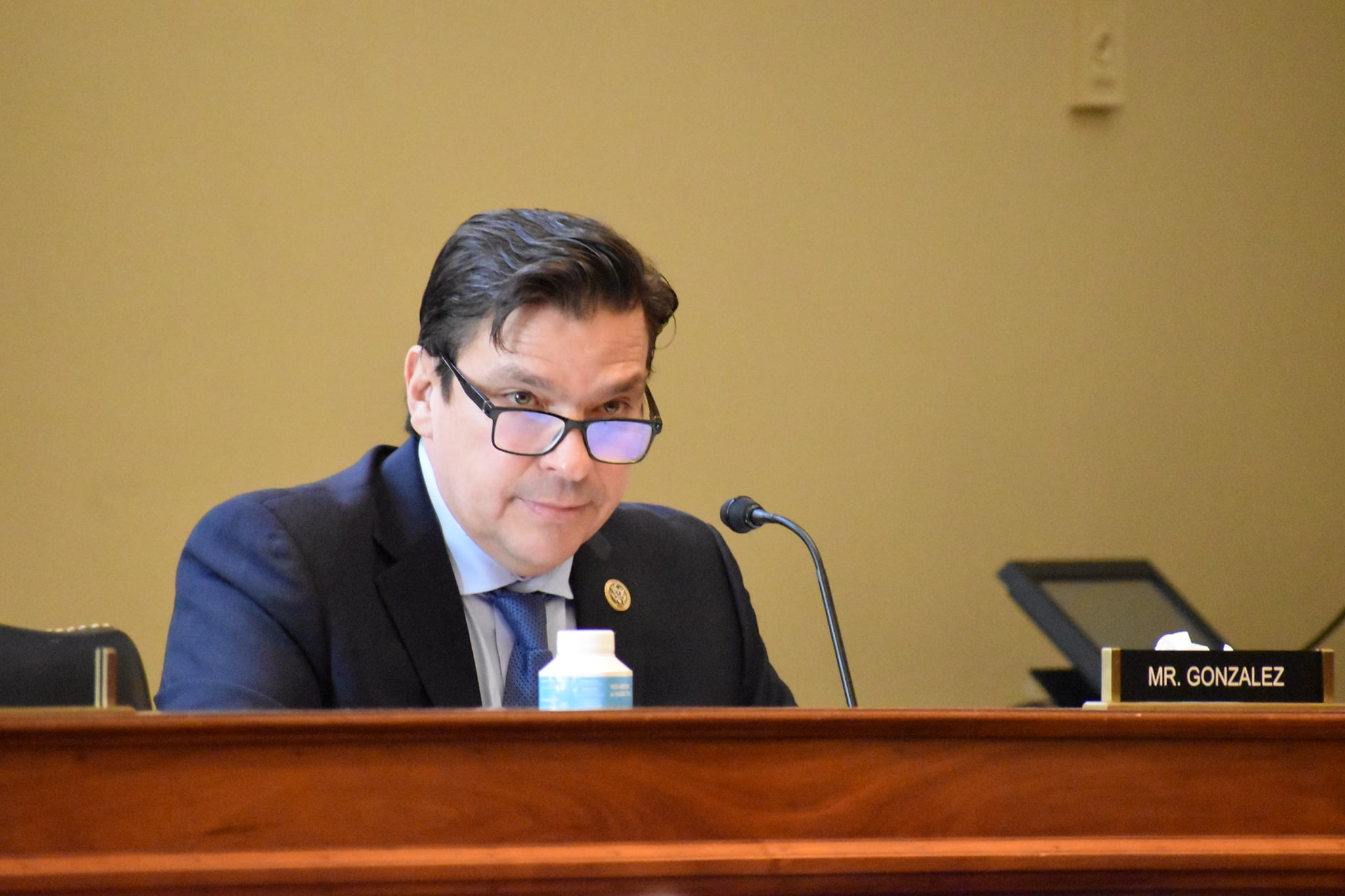
Gonzalez sits on the Financial Services Committee, 2021

For the 119th Congress:

- Committee on Financial Services
  - Subcommittee on Investor Protection, Entrepreneurship and Capital Markets
  - Subcommittee on National Security, Illicit Finance, and International Financial Institutions

=== Caucus memberships ===
Gonzalez's caucus memberships include:

- Blue Dog Coalition (co-chair)
- Congressional Arts Caucus
- New Democrat Coalition
- Problem Solvers Caucus (former member)
- Congressional Hispanic Caucus
- Congressional Oil & Gas Caucus (chair)
- Critical Minerals Caucus (co-chair)
- El Salvador Caucus

== Personal life ==
Gonzalez is married to Lorena, a former teacher and school administrator. They live in McAllen, Texas.

He is Roman Catholic.

== See also ==
- List of Hispanic and Latino Americans in the United States Congress

U.S. House of Representatives
Preceded by Rubén Hinojosa	Member of the U.S. House of Representatives from Texas's 15th congressional district 2017–2023	Succeeded by Monica De La Cruz
Preceded by Mayra Flores	Member of the U.S. House of Representatives from Texas's 34th congressional district 2023–present	Incumbent
Party political offices
Preceded by Marie Gluesenkamp Perez	Chair of the Blue Dog Coalition for Communications; 2025–present Served alongside: Marie Gluesenkamp Perez (Administration), Lou Correa (Policy)	Incumbent
U.S. order of precedence (ceremonial)
Preceded by Brian Fitzpatrick	United States representatives by seniority 165th	Succeeded by Josh Gottheimer
