= Burgos Municipality, Tamaulipas =

Coordinates: 24°57′N 98°47′W

Burgos
- Municipality
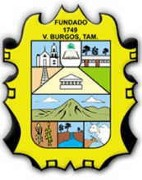
- Coat of arms

- Location in Mexico Burgos (Mexico)
- Country: Mexico
- State: Tamaulipas
- Demonym: (in Spanish)
- Time zone: UTC−6 (CST)

Burgos is a municipality located in the Mexican state of Tamaulipas.

== History ==
On February 20, 1749, the captain José Antonio Leal de León y Guerra founded the village of Nuestra Señora de Loreto de Burgos, populated mainly with families from Linares.

== Climate ==
Climate data for Burgos (1991–2020)
Month	Jan	Feb	Mar	Apr	May	Jun	Jul	Aug	Sep	Oct	Nov	Dec	Year
Record high °C (°F)	37.0 (98.6)	41.0 (105.8)	42.0 (107.6)	45.0 (113.0)	47.0 (116.6)	47.0 (116.6)	44.5 (112.1)	43.0 (109.4)	42.6 (108.7)	39.0 (102.2)	38.0 (100.4)	38.0 (100.4)	47.0 (116.6)
Mean daily maximum °C (°F)	22.3 (72.1)	25.8 (78.4)	29.3 (84.7)	32.9 (91.2)	35.7 (96.3)	37.1 (98.8)	37.6 (99.7)	37.8 (100.0)	34.0 (93.2)	30.8 (87.4)	26.4 (79.5)	22.6 (72.7)	31.0 (87.8)
Daily mean °C (°F)	15.6 (60.1)	18.4 (65.1)	21.9 (71.4)	25.3 (77.5)	28.5 (83.3)	30.2 (86.4)	30.6 (87.1)	30.6 (87.1)	27.8 (82.0)	24.4 (75.9)	20.0 (68.0)	16.2 (61.2)	24.1 (75.4)
Mean daily minimum °C (°F)	8.8 (47.8)	11.0 (51.8)	14.5 (58.1)	17.7 (63.9)	21.3 (70.3)	23.3 (73.9)	23.5 (74.3)	23.4 (74.1)	21.6 (70.9)	18.0 (64.4)	13.6 (56.5)	9.7 (49.5)	17.2 (63.0)
Record low °C (°F)	−3.0 (26.6)	−3.5 (25.7)	1.0 (33.8)	4.0 (39.2)	10.0 (50.0)	14.0 (57.2)	4.0 (39.2)	15.0 (59.0)	2.0 (35.6)	−1.0 (30.2)	−2.0 (28.4)	−3.2 (26.2)	−3.5 (25.7)
Average precipitation mm (inches)	25.3 (1.00)	22.4 (0.88)	41.7 (1.64)	42.5 (1.67)	74.3 (2.93)	57.0 (2.24)	77.9 (3.07)	54.3 (2.14)	132.1 (5.20)	79.5 (3.13)	33.9 (1.33)	33.3 (1.31)	674.2 (26.54)
Average precipitation days (≥ 0.1 mm)	6.2	5.3	5.1	5.4	6.5	5.0	4.3	4.2	9.6	6.8	5.2	7.2	70.8
Source: Servicio Meteorologico Nacional
