= Texas's 34th congressional district =

U.S. House district for Texas

Coordinates: 25.9303°N 97.4844°W

- Interactive map of district boundaries
- Representative: Vicente Gonzalez; D–McAllen
- Distribution: 83.96% urban; 16.04% rural
- Population (2025): 789,988
- Median household income: $58,781
- Ethnicity: 90.3% Hispanic; 7.9% White; 0.6% Asian; 0.4% Black; 0.4% Two or more races; 0.3% other
- Cook PVI: R+3

Texas's 34th congressional district is a United States congressional district in the southern part of Texas that was created as a result of the 2010 census. The first candidates ran in the 2012 elections; the winner, Democrat Filemon Vela Jr., was seated for the 113th United States Congress. The district is currently represented by Vicente Gonzalez (D-McAllen), who was redistricted there from Texas's 15th congressional district.

Texas's 34th congressional district is composed of the area on the Gulf Coast between Brownsville and Corpus Christi, the latter of which being situated in the neighboring 27th congressional district. It extends westward to include the northeastern portion of McAllen and surrounds, with the rest of the McAllen area being in the 15th. In addition to the City of Brownsville, other major towns in the district include Alice, Beeville, Harlingen, Kingsville and San Benito.

The district was one of 13 congressional districts that voted for Donald Trump in the 2024 presidential election while simultaneously electing a Democrat in the 2024 House of Representatives elections.

== Recent election results from statewide races ==
=== 2023–2027 boundaries ===
Year	Office	Results
2008	President	Obama 67% - 32%
2012	President	Obama 69% - 31%
2014	Senate	Alameel 59% - 41%
2014	Governor	Davis 62% - 38%
2016	President	Clinton 66% - 30%
2018	Senate	O'Rourke 65% - 34%
2018	Governor	Valdez 57% - 41%
2018	Lt. Governor	Collier 63% - 35%
2018	Attorney General	Nelson 65% - 33%
2018	Comptroller of Public Accounts	Chevalier 61% - 33%
2020	President	Biden 57% - 42%
2020	Senate	Hegar 56% - 41%
2022	Governor	O'Rourke 56% - 43%
2022	Lt. Governor	Collier 53% - 44%
2022	Attorney General	Mercedes Garza 57% - 41%
2022	Comptroller of Public Accounts	Dudding 53% - 41%
2024	President	Trump 52% - 47%
2024	Senate	Allred 52% - 46%

=== 2027–2033 boundaries ===
Year	Office	Results
2008	President	Obama 53% - 46%
2012	President	Obama 55% - 45%
2014	Senate	Cornyn 56% - 44%
2014	Governor	Abbott 51% - 49%
2016	President	Clinton 54% - 42%
2018	Senate	O'Rourke 55% - 44%
2018	Governor	Abbott 52% - 47%
2018	Lt. Governor	Collier 53% - 45%
2018	Attorney General	Nelson 54% - 43%
2018	Comptroller of Public Accounts	Chevalier 50% - 45%
2020	President	Biden 51% - 48%
2020	Senate	Hegar 49% - 48%
2022	Governor	Abbott 50% - 49%
2022	Lt. Governor	Patrick 50% - 47%
2022	Attorney General	Mercedes Garza 49% - 48%
2022	Comptroller of Public Accounts	Hegar 49% - 46%
2024	President	Trump 55% - 44%
2024	Senate	Cruz 50% - 48%
2026	Senate	Talarico 61% - 36%
2026	Governor	Hinojosa 59% - 39%

== Current composition ==
For the 118th and successive Congresses (based on redistricting following the 2020 census), the district contains all or portions of the following counties and communities:

Cameron County (53)

All 53 communities

Hidalgo County (30)

Alamo, Donna, Edcouch, Edinburg (part; also 15th), Elsa, Heidelberg, Indian Hills, La Blanca (part; also 15th), Laguna Seca, La Villa, Llano Grande, Lopezville, McAllen (part; also 15th), Mercedes, Midway North, Midway South, Mila Doce, Muniz, Murillo, North Alamo, Olivarez, Pharr (part; also 15th), Progreso, Progreso Lakes, Relampago, San Carlos (part; also 15th), San Juan (part; also 15th), Scissors, Villa Verde, Weslaco

Kenedy County (1)

Sarita

Kleberg County (4)

All 4 communities

Willacy County (10)

All 10 communities

== Future composition ==
Beginning with the 2026 election, the 34th district will consist of the following counties:

- Cameron
- Kenedy
- Kleberg
- Nueces (part)
- Willacy

== List of members representing the district ==
Representative	Party	Term	Cong ress	Electoral history	District location
District established January 3, 2013
Filemon Vela Jr. (Brownsville)	Democratic	January 3, 2013 – March 31, 2022	113th 114th 115th 116th 117th	Elected in 2012. Re-elected in 2014. Re-elected in 2016. Re-elected in 2018. Re-elected in 2020. Resigned.	2013–2023 Bee, Cameron, DeWitt, Goliad, Jim Wells, Kenedy, Kleberg, and Willacy; parts of Gonzales, Hidalgo, and San Patricio
Vacant		March 31, 2022 – June 21, 2022	117th		2013–2023 Bee, Cameron, DeWitt, Goliad, Jim Wells, Kenedy, Kleberg, and Willacy; parts of Gonzales, Hidalgo, and San Patricio
Mayra Flores (McAllen)	Republican	June 21, 2022 – January 3, 2023	117th	Elected to finish Vela's term. Lost re-election.	2013–2023 Bee, Cameron, DeWitt, Goliad, Jim Wells, Kenedy, Kleberg, and Willacy; parts of Gonzales, Hidalgo, and San Patricio
Vicente Gonzalez (McAllen)	Democratic	January 3, 2023 – present	118th 119th	Redistricted from the 15th district and re-elected in 2022. Re-elected in 2024. Re-elected in 2026.	2023–2027 Cameron, Kenedy, Kleberg, and Willacy; parts of Hidalgo

== Recent election results ==
2012 Texas's 34th congressional district election
Party	Candidate	Votes	%	±%
Democratic	Filemon Vela Jr.	89,606	61.89	N/A
Republican	Jessica Puente Bradshaw	52,448	36.23	N/A
Libertarian	Steven Shanklin	2,724	1.88	N/A
Total votes		144,778	100.00	
Democratic win (new seat)				

2014 Texas's 34th congressional district election
Party	Candidate	Votes	%	±%
Democratic	Filemon Vela Jr. (incumbent)	47,503	59.47	–2.42
Republican	Larry Smith	30,811	38.57	+2.34
Libertarian	Ryan Rowley	1,563	1.96	+0.08
Total votes		79,877	100.00	
Democratic hold				

2016 Texas's 34th congressional district election
Party	Candidate	Votes	%	±%
Democratic	Filemon Vela Jr. (incumbent)	104,638	62.67	+3.20
Republican	Rey Gonzalez Jr.	62,323	37.33	–1.24
Total votes		166,961	100.00	
Democratic hold				

2018 Texas's 34th congressional district election
Party	Candidate	Votes	%	±%
Democratic	Filemon Vela Jr. (incumbent)	85,825	59.99	–2.68
Republican	Rey Gonzalez Jr.	57,243	40.01	+2.68
Total votes		143,068	100.00	
Democratic hold				

2020 Texas's 34th congressional district election
Party	Candidate	Votes	%	±%
Democratic	Filemon Vela Jr. (incumbent)	111,439	55.44	–4.55
Republican	Rey Gonzalez Jr.	84,119	41.85	+1.84
Libertarian	Anthony Cristo	3,222	1.60	N/A
Independent	Chris Royal	2,235	1.12	N/A
Total votes		201,027	100.00	
Democratic hold				

2022 Texas's 34th congressional district special election
Party	Candidate	Votes	%
Republican	Mayra Flores	14,799	50.91
Democratic	Dan Sanchez	12,606	43.37
Democratic	Rene Coronado	1,210	4.16
Republican	Juana Cantu-Cabrera	454	1.56
Total votes		29,069	100.00
Republican gain from Democratic			

2022 Texas's 34th congressional district election
Party	Candidate	Votes	%
Democratic	Vicente Gonzalez (incumbent)	70,896	52.73
Republican	Mayra Flores (incumbent)	59,464	44.23
Independent	Chris Royal	4,079	3.03
Total votes		134,439	100.00
Democratic gain from Republican			

2024 Texas's 34th congressional district election
Party	Candidate	Votes	%	±%
Democratic	Vicente Gonzalez (incumbent)	102,780	51.29	−1.44
Republican	Mayra Flores	97,603	48.71	+4.48
Total votes		200,383	100.00	
Democratic hold				
