= 2022 Texas gubernatorial election =

- November 8, 2022
- Turnout: 45.85% (of registered voters) ▼7.16pp 37.06% (of voting age population)
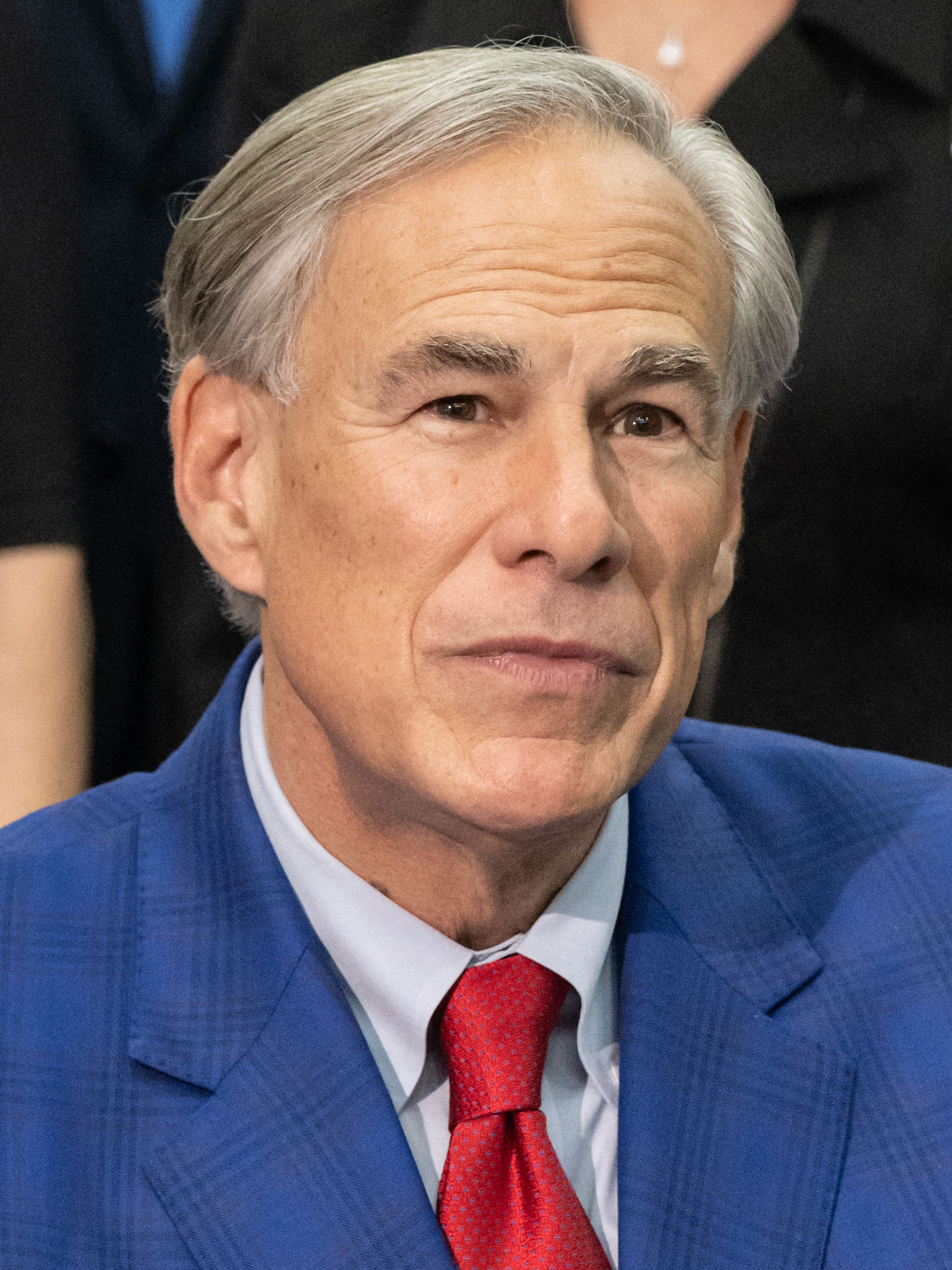

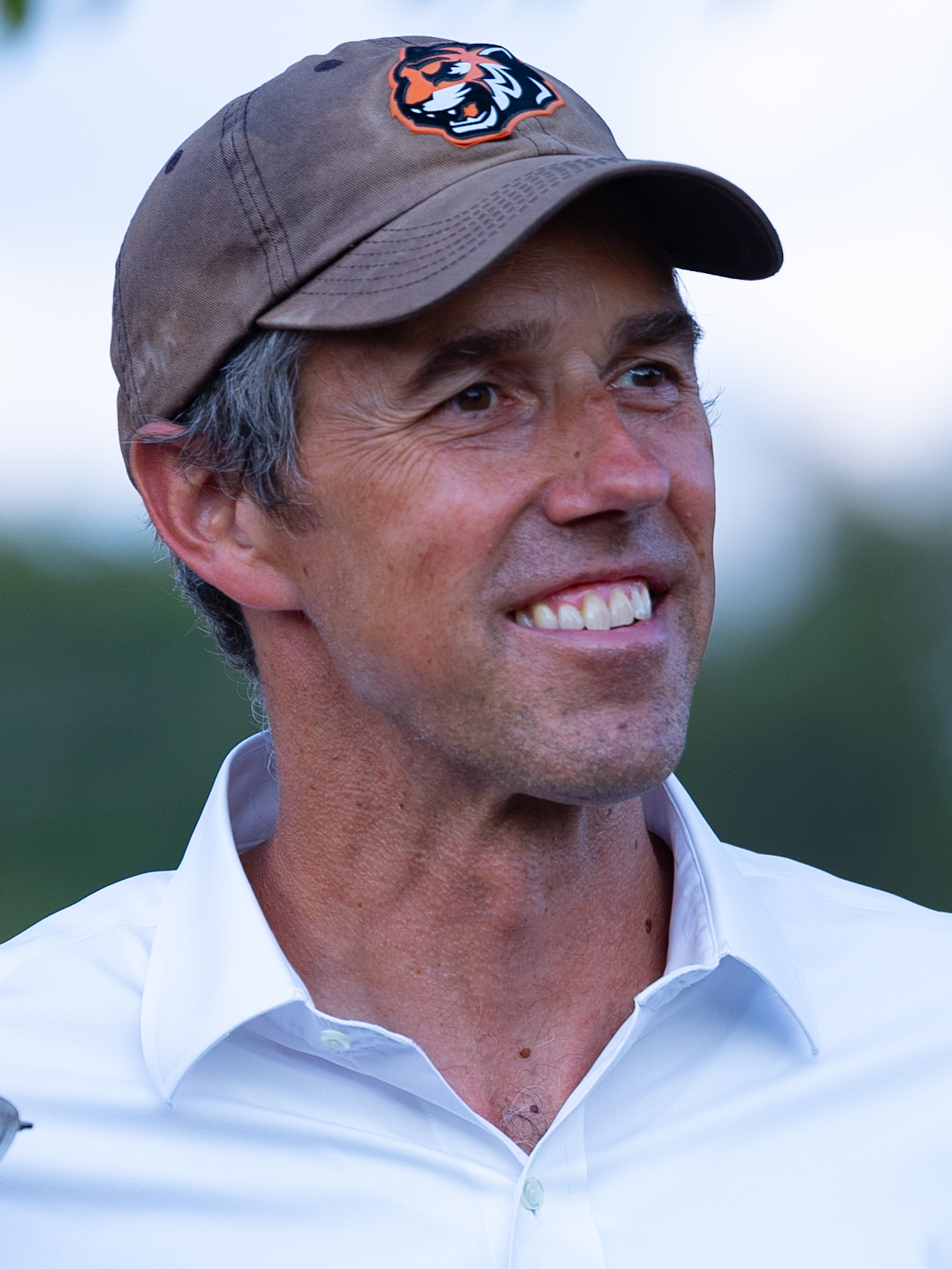
Nominee	Greg Abbott	Beto O'Rourke
Party	Republican	Democratic
Popular vote	4,435,558	3,553,656
Percentage	54.75%	43.86%
- Abbott: 40–50% 50–60% 60–70% 70–80% 80–90% >90% O'Rourke: 40–50% 50–60% 60–70% 70–80% 80–90% >90% Tie: 40–50% 50% No data
Governor before election
Greg Abbott
Republican
Elected Governor
Greg Abbott
Republican

The 2022 Texas gubernatorial election took place on November 8, 2022, to elect the governor of Texas. Incumbent Republican Governor Greg Abbott won re-election to a third term, defeating the Democratic nominee, former Congressman Beto O'Rourke. All statewide elected offices were currently held by Republicans. In his previous gubernatorial race in 2018, Abbott won with 55.8% of the vote.

The Democratic and Republican primaries were held on March 1, 2022. O'Rourke and Abbott won outright majorities in their respective primaries, and therefore did not participate in the May 24 runoffs.

Texas had not elected a Democratic candidate for governor since Ann Richards won a narrow victory in 1990. Additionally, Abbott had a strong approval rating on election day, with 55% of voters approving to 45% disapproving. Beto O'Rourke, who gained national attention in 2018 for his unusually close and competitive campaign against Senator Ted Cruz, was at one-time widely viewed as a rising star in the Texas Democratic Party and potential challenger for Abbott. However, in the intervening years, he amassed baggage that was leveraged against him in 2022, including a failed run for President of the United States in 2020 that led to accusations of opportunism, and shifting stances related to gun control during that presidential campaign.

Abbott won by 10.9%, a slightly smaller margin of victory than his 13.3% margin in 2018 in spite of a much more Republican national climate in 2022, making this the closest gubernatorial election in Texas since 2006, and the closest election of Abbott's entire political career since his first race for the Texas Supreme Court in 1998. Beto O'Rourke, meanwhile, performed 8.3% worse than his 2018 Senate run, but he still won the highest share for a Democratic gubernatorial candidate since Ann Richards received 45.9% in her unsuccessful reelection bid against George W. Bush in 1994. Abbott's raw vote total was less than his 4.65 million in 2018, while O'Rourke narrowly set a record for the most raw votes received by a Texas Democratic gubernatorial candidate at more than 3.55 million, (Note: O'Rourke's total was roughly 7,000 higher than Lupe Valdez's in 2018.) but it was also less than his 4.04 million vote total in the 2018 Senate race.

Abbott carried 235 out of 254 counties, flipping the heavily Hispanic counties of Culberson and Zapata and becoming the first Republican gubernatorial candidate to win the latter in the state's history (though Zapata had earlier voted Republican in the 2020 presidential election), while O'Rourke became the first Democratic gubernatorial candidate to win the county of Fort Bend since 1974. O'Rourke outperformed Joe Biden two years prior among Latino voters, though his performance with them was still worse than past nominees.

== Republican primary ==
On June 4, 2021, Texas Republican Party chairman Allen West announced his resignation as party chair. West criticized Gov. Greg Abbott's handling of the COVID-19 pandemic in Texas. The history of conflict between West and Abbott included a lawsuit by West and other Republicans challenging Abbott's extension of the early voting period in 2020, as well as a protest outside the Governor's Mansion over pandemic-related shutdowns as well as mask mandates. On July 4, 2021, West announced that he would challenge Abbott in the 2022 gubernatorial primary. Both West and fellow gubernatorial candidate Don Huffines were considered more conservative than Abbott. On March 1, 2022, Abbott won the Republican primary by a smaller margin than in 2018.

=== Candidates ===
==== Nominee ====
- Greg Abbott, incumbent governor and former Texas attorney general

==== Eliminated in primary ====
- Paul G. Belew, criminal defense attorney
- Danny Harrison, businessman
- Kandy Kaye Horn, philanthropist
- Don Huffines, former member of the Texas Senate
- Ricky Lynn Perry, staffing agency employee
- Chad Prather, podcaster / talk show host, activist, and stand-up comedian
- Allen West, former chair of the Texas Republican Party and former U.S. representative for Florida's 22nd congressional district

==== Withdrawn ====
- Martin Holsome, former Rusk city councillor
- Kurt Schwab, military veteran

==== Declined ====
- George P. Bush, Texas land commissioner and member of the Bush family (ran for attorney general)
- Christi Craddick, Texas railroad commissioner
- Glenn Hegar, Texas comptroller of public accounts (running for re-election)
- Sid Miller, Texas agriculture commissioner (running for re-election)
- Rick Perry, former governor and former U.S. secretary of energy
- Joe Straus, former speaker of the Texas House of Representatives

=== Endorsements ===
Greg Abbott

U.S. executive branch officials

- Sarah Huckabee Sanders, former White House press secretary (2017–2019) and candidate for governor of Arkansas
- Donald Trump, 45th president of the United States (2017–2021)

U.S. senators

- Ted Cruz, U.S. senator from Texas (2013–present)

State officials

- Ken Paxton, 50th attorney general of Texas (2015–2027)

Organizations

- Combined Law Enforcement Associations of Texas
- National Border Patrol Council
- National Federation of Independent Business
- NRA Political Victory Fund
- Susan B. Anthony List
- Texas Apartment Association
- Texas Association of Business
- Texas Farm Bureau AGFUND
- Texas for Lawsuit Reform
- Texas Medical Association
- Texas Municipal Police Association
- Texas Oil and Gas Association
Don Huffines

U.S. senators

- Rand Paul, U.S. senator from Kentucky (2011–present)

U.S. representatives

- Ron Paul, former U.S. representative for Texas's 22nd congressional district (1976–1977, 1979–1985) and Texas's 14th congressional district (1997–2013)

Texas state representatives

- ~~Matt Rinaldi, chair of the Republican Party of Texas (2021–present) and former state representative (2015–2019)~~ (withdrawn at Huffines's request following Rinaldi's election as chair of the Texas Republican Party)
- Jonathan Stickland, former state representative (2013–2021)

Local officials

- Don McLaughlin, mayor of Uvalde (2014–2023)

Individuals

- Julie McCarty, True Texas Project CEO
- Katrina Pierson, national spokesperson for Donald Trump's 2016 presidential campaign
Allen West

Texas state representatives

- Kyle Biedermann, state representative (2017–present)

Individuals

- Ted Nugent, musician and political activist

=== Polling ===
Poll source	Date(s) administered	Sample size (Note: Key: A – all adults RV – registered voters LV – likely voters V – unclear)	Margin of error	Greg Abbott	Don Huffines	Ricky Lynn Perry	Chad Prather	Allen West	Other	Undecided
The Trafalgar Group (R)	February 25–28, 2022	1,040 (LV)	± 3.0%	62%	10%	2%	2%	15%	5% (Note: Harrison with 3%; Belew and Horn with 1%)	3%
Emerson College	February 21–22, 2022	522 (LV)	± 4.2%	61%	9%	3%	3%	12%	3% (Note: Harrison with 3%; Belew and Horn with 0%)	9%
UT Tyler	February 8–15, 2022	581 (LV)	± 4.4%	60%	3%	6%	3%	7%	5% (Note: Horn with 2%; Belew and Harrison with 1%)	15%
YouGov/UT	January 28 – February 7, 2022	375 (LV)	± 5.1%	60%	14%	5%	3%	15%	3% (Note: Someone else with 2%, Horn with 1%)	–
Paradigm Partners (R) (Note: Poll conducted for West's campaign)	January 31, 2022	1,542 (LV)	± 2.5%	34%	5%	6%	6%	43%	3% (Note: Belew, Harrison, and Horn with 1%)	4%
UT Tyler	January 18–25, 2022	514 (LV)	± 5.1%	59%	4%	4%	2%	6%	4% (Note: Horn with 2%; Belew and Harrison with 1%)	20%
YouGov/UH	January 14–24, 2022	490 (LV)	± 3.7%	58%	7%	3%	2%	11%	2% (Note: Harrison and Horn with 1%; Belew with 0%)	17%
Paradigm Partners (R)	January 9, 2022	1,486 (LV)	± 2.5%	33%	5%	12%	3%	38%	3% (Note: Belew, Harrison, and Horn with 1%)	7%
Paradigm Partners (R)	December 16, 2021	447 (LV)	± 4.5%	33%	2%	15%	1%	35%	–	14%
Paradigm Partners (R)	November 30, 2021	– (LV)	–	42%	3%	–	2%	36%	–	17%
UT Tyler	November 9–16, 2021	520 (LV)	± 4.7%	65%	3%	–	6%	6%	3%	18%
Paradigm Partners (R)	November 11, 2021	– (LV)	–	43%	3%	–	2%	33%	–	19%
YouGov/UT/TT	October 22–31, 2021	554 (RV)	± 4.2%	56%	7%	–	4%	13%	4%	16%
YouGov/TXHPF	October 14–27, 2021	405 (LV)	± 4.9%	61%	4%	–	3%	13%	–	19%
UT Tyler	September 7–14, 2021	427 (LV)	± 6.1%	70%	15%	–	–	–	15%	–
UT Tyler	September 7–14, 2021	431 (LV)	± 6.0%	65%	–	–	–	20%	15%	–
Victory Insights (R)	July 22–24, 2021	400 (RV)	± 4.9%	80%	–	–	–	20%	–	–
Paradigm Partners (R)	June 30, 2021	– (LV)	–	73%	–	–	–	17%	–	10%
UT Tyler	June 22–29, 2021	440 (LV)	± 5.4%	77%	12%	–	–	–	11%	–

Hypothetical polling

Poll source	Date(s) administered	Sample size	Margin of error	Greg Abbott	Don Huffines	Sid Miller	Allen West	Undecided
Public Opinion Strategies (R) (Note: Poll conducted for Abbott's campaign)	June 14–17, 2021	446 (LV)	± 4.6%	69%	3%	3%	13%	–

=== Results ===
Results by county: Abbott: 40–50%; 50–60%; 60–70%; 70–80%; 80–90%

Republican primary results
Party	Candidate	Votes	%
Republican	Greg Abbott (incumbent)	1,299,059	66.48%
Republican	Allen West	239,557	12.26%
Republican	Don Huffines	234,138	11.98%
Republican	Chad Prather	74,173	3.80%
Republican	Ricky Lynn Perry	61,424	3.14%
Republican	Kandy Kaye Horn	23,605	1.21%
Republican	Paul Belew	11,387	0.58%
Republican	Danny Harrison	10,829	0.55%
Total votes		1,954,172	100%

== Democratic primary ==
=== Candidates ===
==== Nominee ====
- Beto O'Rourke, former U.S. representative for Texas's 16th congressional district, nominee for U.S. Senate in 2018 and candidate for president of the United States in 2020

==== Eliminated in primary ====
- Inocencio Barrientez, fitness trainer
- Michael Cooper, pastor, candidate for lieutenant governor in 2018, and candidate for U.S. Senate in 2020
- Joy Diaz, reporter
- Rich Wakeland, former advisor to Public Utility Commissioner Ken Anderson

==== Disqualified ====
- Jack Daniel Foster Jr., teacher
- R. Star Locke, veteran

==== Declined ====
- Steve Adler, mayor of Austin
- Joaquin Castro, U.S. representative for Texas's 20th congressional district (endorsed O'Rourke)
- Julián Castro, former U.S. secretary of housing and urban development, former mayor of San Antonio, and candidate for president of the United States in 2020
- Wendy Davis, former state senator, nominee for governor in 2014, and nominee for Texas's 21st congressional district in 2020
- Veronica Escobar, U.S. representative for Texas's 16th congressional district, former El Paso commissioner, and former El Paso county judge (running for re-election)
- Lina Hidalgo, Harris County judge

=== Endorsements ===
Beto O'Rourke

U.S. senators

- Kirsten Gillibrand, U.S. senator from New York (2009–present) and candidate for president of the United States in 2020

U.S. representatives

- Rubén Hinojosa, former U.S. representative for Texas's 15th congressional district (1997–2017)

Local officials

- Ron Nirenberg, mayor of San Antonio (2017–present) (Independent)

Labor unions

- Texas Federation of Teachers
- Texas AFL–CIO
- Texas State Employees Union

Organizations

- Democracy for America
- End Citizens United
- Let America Vote
- March On
- MoveOn
- Planned Parenthood Texas Votes
- Stonewall Democrats
- Texas College Democrats

Newspapers and other media

- Austin American Statesman
- The Austin Chronicle
- The Dallas Morning News
- Houston Chronicle

=== Polling ===
Poll source	Date(s) administered	Sample size	Margin of error	Inocencio Barrientez	Michael Cooper	Joy Diaz	Jack Foster Jr.	Deirdre Gilbert	Star Locke	Beto O'Rourke	Rich Wakeland	Other	Undecided
Emerson College	February 21–22, 2022	388 (LV)	± 4.9%	1%	5%	4%	–	–	–	78%	2%	–	11%
UT Tyler	February 8–15, 2022	479 (LV)	± 4.9%	2%	3%	4%	2%	2%	2%	68%	2%	–	14%
YouGov/UT	January 28 – February 7, 2022	348 (LV)	± 5.3%	2%	1%	2%	–	–	–	93%	1%	1%	–
UT Tyler	January 18–25, 2022	459 (LV)	± 5.4%	1%	6%	4%	2%	1%	1%	58%	0%	–	27%
YouGov/UH	January 14–24, 2022	616 (LV)	± 3.3%	3%	4%	3%	–	–	–	73%	1%	–	16%
YouGov/UT/TT	October 22–31, 2021	436 (RV)	± 4.7%	–	–	–	–	–	–	70%	–	5%	25%

=== Results ===
Democratic primary results by county O'Rourke: 40–50%; 50–60%; 60–70%; 70–80%; 80–90%; 90–100%; Wakeland: 40–50%; Barrientez: 50–60%; No vote

Democratic primary results
Party	Candidate	Votes	%
Democratic	Beto O'Rourke	983,182	91.41%
Democratic	Joy Diaz	33,622	3.13%
Democratic	Michael Cooper	32,673	3.04%
Democratic	Rich Wakeland	13,237	1.23%
Democratic	Inocencio Barrientez	12,887	1.20%
Total votes		1,075,601	100%

== Green primary ==
=== Candidates ===
==== Declared ====
- Delilah Barrios, environmental activist

== Libertarian convention ==
=== Candidates ===
==== Declared ====
- Mark Jay Tippetts, attorney, former Lago Vista city councilman, and nominee for governor in 2018

==== Withdrew/disqualified ====
- Dan Behrman, software engineer, internet personality, candidate for Texas House of Representatives in 2014, and candidate for President of the United States in 2020
- Andrew Jewell, industrial maintenance technician, secretary of Libertarian Party of Dallas County, chair of Texas Libertarian Party Radical Caucus, and candidate for Dallas County commissioner District 3 in 2020

== Independents and other parties ==
=== Candidates ===
==== Declared ====
- Jacqueline Abernathy, public health policies consultant and American Solidarity Party candidate
- Deirdre Dickson-Gilbert, public educator (previously ran for Democratic nomination)
- Ricardo Turullols-Bonilla, retired educator and write-in candidate for U.S. Senate in 2020

==== Disqualified ====
- Patrick Wynne, software engineer, data scientist and U.S. Navy veteran (Reform Party)

==== Declined ====
- Matthew McConaughey, Academy Award-winning actor (no declared party affiliation)

== General election ==
=== Predictions ===
Source	Ranking	As of
The Cook Political Report	Likely R	March 4, 2022
Inside Elections	Solid R	July 22, 2022
Sabato's Crystal Ball	Likely R	June 29, 2022
Politico	Likely R	April 1, 2022
RCP	Lean R	January 10, 2022
Fox News	Likely R	May 12, 2022
538	Solid R	September 21, 2022
Elections Daily	Likely R	November 7, 2022

=== Debates ===
2022 Texas gubernatorial general election debates
No.	Date	Host	Moderators	Link	Republican	Democratic
Key: P Participant A Absent N Non-invitee I Invitee W Withdrawn						
Key: P Participant A Absent N Non-invitee I Invitee W Withdrawn					Greg Abbott	Beto O'Rourke
1	Sep. 30, 2022	KXAN-TV	Sally Hernandez; Gromer Jeffers; Steve Spriester	KXAN-TV	P	P

=== Post-primary endorsements ===
Greg Abbott (R)

U.S. senators

- John Cornyn, U.S. senator from Texas (2002–2027)

U.S. representatives

- Dan Crenshaw, U.S. representative for Texas's 2nd congressional district (2019–2027)
- Louie Gohmert, U.S. representative for Texas's 1st congressional district (2005–2023)

Governors

- Mike Huckabee, 44th governor of Arkansas (1996–2007) and candidate for president in 2008 and 2016

State officials

- Cole Hefner, state representative from the 5th district (2017–present)
- Bryan Hughes, state senator from the 1st district (2017–present)
- Ken King, state representative from the 88th district (2013–present)
- Four Price, state representative from the 87th district (2011–2025)
- John T. Smithee, state representative from the 86th district (1985–present)

Newspapers

- The Amarillo Pioneer
- The Beaumont Examiner
- Fort Worth Star-Telegram

Organizations

- Americans for Prosperity
- The LIBRE Initiative
- National Right to Life Committee
- Texas Alliance for Life
- Texas Association of Realtors
Beto O'Rourke (D)

U.S. executive branch officials

- Julian Castro, 16th U.S. secretary of housing and urban development (2014–2017) and candidate for president in 2020
- Barack Obama, 44th president of the United States (2009–2017)

U.S. representatives

- Colin Allred, U.S. representative for Texas's 32nd congressional district (2019–2025)
- Sylvia Garcia, U.S. representative for Texas's 29th congressional district (2019–present)
- Eddie Bernice Johnson, U.S. representative for Texas's 30th congressional district (1993–2023)
- Sheila Jackson Lee, U.S. representative for Texas's 18th congressional district (1995–2024)

State officials

- Julie Johnson, state representative from the 115th district (2019–2025)
- Shawn Thierry, state representative from the 146th district (2017–present)

County officials

- Lina Hidalgo, Harris County judge (2019–present)

Local officials

- Sylvester Turner, mayor of Houston (2016–2024)

Individuals

- Matthew Broderick, actor
- The Chicks, country band
- Will Ferrell, actor and comedian
- Selena Gomez, actress and singer
- Luci Baines Johnson, businesswoman and daughter of U.S. President Lyndon B. Johnson
- Lin-Manuel Miranda, actor
- Kacey Musgraves, country singer
- Willie Nelson, country singer
- Gwyneth Paltrow, actress
- Sarah Jessica Parker, actress
- Gregg Popovich, professional basketball coach
- George Soros, businessman
- Lionel Sosa, marketing executive
- Harry Styles, musician
- Kerry Washington, actress
- Hayley Williams, singer
- Oprah Winfrey, businesswoman and talk show host
- Eugene Lee Yang, filmmaker

Labor unions

- National Education Association
- SEIU Texas
- United Auto Workers

Organizations

- Common Defense
- Equality Texas
- Everytown for Gun Safety
- Feminist Majority PAC
- Giffords
- Human Rights Campaign
- Jolt Action
- NARAL Pro-Choice America
- National Nurses United
- Texas Organizing Project
- Texas Rising Action
- Voter Protection Project

Newspapers

- San Antonio Express-News

=== Polling ===
Aggregate polls

Source of poll aggregation	Dates administered	Dates updated	Greg Abbott (R)	Beto O'Rourke (D)	Other (Note: Calculated by taking the difference of 100% and all other candidates combined.)	Margin
Real Clear Politics	October 3–19, 2022	October 25, 2022	52.8%	43.5%	3.7%	Abbott +9.3
FiveThirtyEight	June 14, 2021 – October 25, 2022	October 25, 2022	51.4%	42.9%	5.7%	Abbott +8.5
Average			52.1%	43.2%	4.7%	Abbott +8.9

Poll source	Date(s) administered	Sample size	Margin of error	Greg Abbott (R)	Beto O'Rourke (D)	Other	Undecided
CWS Research (R) (Note: Poll conducted for the Defend Texas Liberty PAC.)	November 2–5, 2022	786 (LV)	± 3.5%	53%	42%	2%	3%
UT Tyler	October 17–24, 2022	1,330 (RV)	± 2.9%	47%	44%	7% (Note: "Someone else" with 4%; Tippetts (L) with 2%; Barrios (G) with 1%)	1%
UT Tyler	October 17–24, 2022	973 (LV)	± 3.4%	50%	44%	5% (Note: "Someone else" with 2%; Tippetts (L) with 2%; Barrios (G) with 1%)	1%
Emerson College	October 17–19, 2022	1,000 (LV)	± 3.0%	52%	42%	1% (Note: Tippetts (L) with 1%; Barrios (G) with <1%)	4%
Emerson College	October 17–19, 2022	1,000 (LV)	± 3.0%	53%	44%	3% (Note: Tippetts (L) with 2%; Barrios (G) with 1%)	–
Siena College	October 16–19, 2022	649 (LV)	± 5.1%	52%	43%	2% (Note: "Another candidate" with 1%; "Not going to vote" with 1%)	4%
Beacon Research (D) (Note: Poll conducted for the Democratic Policy Institute, a non-profit organization advocating for progressive causes.)	October 15–19, 2022	1,264 (RV)	± 2.8%	48%	45%	–	–
BSP Research/UT (Note: Poll sponsored by Univision.)	October 11–18, 2022	1,400 (RV)	± 2.6%	46%	42%	3% (Note: "Someone else" with 3%)	9%
YouGov/UT	October 7–17, 2022	833 (LV)	± 3.3%	54%	43%	4% (Note: "Someone else" with 2%; Tippetts and Barrios with 1%)	2%
Civiqs	October 8–11, 2022	791 (LV)	± 4.0%	52%	44%	3% (Note: "Someone else" with 3%)	0%
Marist College	October 3–6, 2022	1,058 (RV)	± 4.4%	49%	45%	1% (Note: "Another party's candidate" with 1%)	5%
Marist College	October 3–6, 2022	898 (LV)	± 4.8%	52%	44%	1% (Note: "Another party's candidate" with 1%)	4%
Quinnipiac University	September 22–26, 2022	1,327 (LV)	± 2.7%	53%	46%	2% (Note: "Someone else" with 1%; "Refused" with 1%)	–
Emerson College	September 20–22, 2022	1,000 (LV)	± 3.0%	50%	42%	4% (Note: Tippetts (L) with 2%; "Someone else" with 2%)	5%
ActiVote	June 23 – September 21, 2022	323 (LV)	± 6.0%	47%	40%	12% (Note: Tippetts with 9%; Barrios with 3%)	–
Siena College	September 14–18, 2022	651 (LV)	± 4.4%	50%	43%	2% (Note: "Another candidate" with 1%; "Not going to vote" with 1%)	5%
Texas Hispanic Policy Foundation	September 6–15, 2022	1,172 (LV)	± 2.9%	51%	44%	2% (Note: Barrios and Tippetts with 1%)	3%
UT Tyler	September 7–13, 2022	1,268 (RV)	± 2.9%	47%	38%	9% (Note: "Someone else" with 6%; Barrios and Tippets with 3%)	2%
Data for Progress (D)	September 2–9, 2022	712 (LV)	± 4.0%	50%	45%	2% (Note: "Another candidate" with 2%)	3%
Echelon Insights	August 31 – September 7, 2022	813 (LV)	± 4.4%	48%	46%	–	6%
YouGov/UT	August 26 – September 6, 2022	1,200 (RV)	± 2.8%	45%	40%	4% (Note: Tippetts with 2% and Barrios with 2%)	11%
YouGov/UH/TSU	August 11–29, 2022	1,312 (LV)	± 2.7%	49%	42%	2% (Note: Tippetts with 1% and Barrios with 1%)	7%
UT Tyler	August 1–7, 2022	1,384 (RV)	± 2.8%	46%	39%	13% (Note: "Someone else" with 7%; Barrios and Tippetts with 3%)	1%
UT Tyler	August 1–7, 2022	1,215 (LV)	± 3.0%	48%	42%	9% (Note: "Someone else" with 4%; Tippetts with 3%; Barrios with 2%)	1%
YouGov/UH	June 27 – July 7, 2022	1,169 (RV)	± 2.9%	47%	42%	2% (Note: Tippetts with 2%; Barrios with 0%)	9%
YouGov/UH	June 27 – July 7, 2022	1,006 (LV)	± 3.1%	49%	44%	2%	5%
YouGov/CBS News	June 22–27, 2022	548 (LV)	± 6.6%	49%	41%	4%	6%
YouGov/UT	June 16–24, 2022	1,200 (RV)	± 2.8%	45%	39%	6% (Note: "Someone else" with 3%; Tippetts with 2%; Barrios with 1%)	10%
YouGov/PerryUndem	June 15–24, 2022	2,000 (RV)	± 2.2%	47%	43%	3%	5%
Quinnipiac University	June 9–13, 2022	1,257 (RV)	± 2.8%	48%	43%	2%	5%
Blueprint Polling (D)	June 8–10, 2022	603 (LV)	± 4.0%	56%	37%	–	7%
UT Tyler	May 2–10, 2022	1,232 (RV)	± 3.1%	46%	39%	14% (Note: "Someone else" with 8%; Barrios and Tippetts with 3%)	2%
YouGov/UT	April 14–22, 2022	1,200 (RV)	± 2.8%	48%	37%	7%	9%
YouGov/TXHPF	March 18–28, 2022	1,139 (LV)	± 2.9%	50%	42%	3% (Note: Tippetts with 2%, Barrios with 1%)	5%
Texas Lyceum	March 11–20, 2022	926 (RV)	± 3.2%	42%	40%	7%	11%
Emerson College	February 21–22, 2022	1,000 (LV)	± 3.0%	52%	45%	–	3%
UT Tyler	February 8–15, 2022	1,188 (RV)	± 3.1%	45%	38%	16%	1%
Climate Nexus	February 1–9, 2022	806 (LV)	± 3.6%	45%	40%	7%	8%
YouGov/UT	January 28 – February 7, 2022	1,200 (RV)	± 2.8%	47%	37%	6%	11%
UT Tyler	January 18–25, 2022	1,072 (RV)	± 3.5%	47%	36%	16%	1%
YouGov/UH	January 14–24, 2022	– (LV) (Note: Subsample of likely general election voters from a survey of 1,400 registered voters (overall margin of error ± 2.2% including design effect))	–	48%	43%	3% (Note: Tippetts with 2%; Barrios with 1%)	6%
Quinnipiac University	December 2–6, 2021	1,224 (RV)	± 2.8%	52%	37%	4%	6%
UT Tyler	November 9–16, 2021	1,106 (RV)	± 3.2%	45%	39%	16%	–
Redfield & Wilton Strategies	November 9, 2021	884 (RV)	± 3.3%	40%	39%	5%	7%
Redfield & Wilton Strategies	November 9, 2021	854 (LV)	± 3.4%	43%	44%	5%	6%
YouGov/UT/TT	October 22–31, 2021	1,200 (RV)	± 2.8%	46%	37%	7%	10%
YouGov/TXHPF	October 14–27, 2021	1,402 (RV)	± 3.1%	43%	42%	3% (Note: Behrman/Jewell with 2%, Barrios with 1%)	12%
UT Tyler	September 7–14, 2021	1,148 (RV)	± 3.7%	42%	37%	21%	–
UT Tyler	June 22–29, 2021	1,090 (RV)	± 3.0%	45%	33%	22%	–
Public Opinion Strategies (R) (Note: Poll conducted for Abbott's campaign)	June 14–17, 2021	800 (LV)	± 3.5%	52%	42%	–	6%

Hypothetical polling

Greg Abbott vs. Julián Castro

Poll source	Date(s) administered	Sample size	Margin of error	Greg Abbott (R)	Julián Castro (D)	Other	Undecided
Redfield & Wilton Strategies	November 9, 2021	884 (RV)	± 3.3%	43%	35%	4%	9%
Redfield & Wilton Strategies	November 9, 2021	854 (LV)	± 3.4%	45%	39%	4%	8%

Greg Abbott vs. Beto O'Rourke with Matthew McConaughey as an independent

Poll source	Date(s) administered	Sample size	Margin of error	Greg Abbott (R)	Beto O'Rourke (D)	Matthew McConaughey (I)	Other	Undecided
Echelon Insights	August 31 – September 7, 2022	813 (LV)	± 4.4%	42%	39%	13%	–	6%
UT Tyler	November 9–16, 2021	1,106 (RV)	± 3.2%	37%	26%	27%	10%	–
YouGov/TXHPF	October 14–27, 2021	1,402 (RV)	± 3.1%	40%	37%	9%	2% (Note: Behrman/Jewell and Barrios with 1%)	12%

Greg Abbott vs. Don Huffines

Poll source	Date(s) administered	Sample size	Margin of error	Greg Abbott (R)	Don Huffines	Other
UT Tyler	June 22–29, 2021	1,090 (RV)	± 3.0%	46%	22%	32%

Greg Abbott vs. Matthew McConaughey

Poll source	Date(s) administered	Sample size	Margin of error	Greg Abbott (R)	Matthew McConaughey	Other
UT Tyler	November 9–16, 2021	1,106 (RV)	± 3.2%	35%	43%	22%
UT Tyler	September 7–14, 2021	1,148 (RV)	± 3.7%	35%	44%	21%
UT Tyler	June 22–29, 2021	1,090 (RV)	± 3.0%	39%	38%	23%
UT Tyler	April 6–13, 2021	1,124 (RV)	± 2.9%	33%	45%	22%

Greg Abbott vs. generic Democrat

Poll source	Date(s) administered	Sample size	Margin of error	Greg Abbott (R)	Generic Democrat	Undecided
Data for Progress (D) (Note: Poll sponsored by the Defend Students Action Fund)	September 15–22, 2020	726 (LV)	± 3.6%	46%	34%	20%

Greg Abbott vs. generic opponent

Poll source	Date(s) administered	Sample size	Margin of error	Greg Abbott (R)	Generic Opponent	Undecided
Quinnipiac University	September 24–27, 2021	863 (RV)	± 3.3%	42%	51%	7%
Quinnipiac University	June 15–21, 2021	1,099 (RV)	± 3.0%	46%	48%	6%

=== Results ===
State Senate district results

State House district results

2022 Texas gubernatorial election
Party	Candidate	Votes	%	±%
Republican	Greg Abbott (incumbent)	4,435,558	54.75%	▼1.05
Democratic	Beto O'Rourke	3,553,656	43.86%	▲1.35
Libertarian	Mark Tippetts	81,932	1.01%	▼0.68
Green	Delilah Barrios	28,584	0.35%	N/A
American Solidarity	Jacqueline Abernathy	1,243	0.02%	N/A
Total votes		8,101,994	100.00%	
Majority		881,902	10.88%	▼2.40
Turnout		8,101,994	45.85%	▼6.98
Registered electors		17,672,143		
Republican hold				

==== By county ====
County	Greg Abbott Republican		Beto O'Rourke Democratic		Various candidates Other parties		Margin		Total
County	#	%	#	%	#	%	#	%	Total
Anderson	11,762	81.43%	2,545	17.62%	138	0.96%	9,217	63.81%	14,445
Andrews	3,302	86.24%	479	12.51%	48	1.25%	2,823	73.73%	3,829
Angelina	19,142	77.83%	5,174	21.04%	279	1.13%	13,968	56.79%	24,595
Aransas	7,581	78.63%	1,924	19.96%	136	1.41%	5,657	58.67%	9,641
Archer	3,498	90.90%	315	8.19%	35	0.01%	3,183	82.72%	3,848
Armstrong	833	92.25%	60	6.64%	10	1.11%	773	85.61%	903
Atascosa	8,801	69.30%	3,709	29.21%	189	1.49%	5,092	40.09%	12,699
Austin	9,209	82.19%	1,873	16.72%	123	1.10%	7,336	65.47%	11,205
Bailey	1,105	82.90%	213	15.98%	15	1.13%	892	66.92%	1,333
Bandera	8,527	81.36%	1,816	17.33%	137	1.31%	6,711	64.03%	10,480
Bastrop	16,707	57.15%	12,007	41.07%	521	1.78%	4,700	16.08%	29,235
Baylor	1,183	90.51%	105	8.03%	19	1.45%	1,078	82.48%	1,307
Bee	4,347	67.84%	1,976	30.84%	85	1.33%	2,371	37.00%	6,408
Bell	51,888	59.01%	34,785	39.56%	1,263	1.44%	17,103	19.45%	87,936
Bexar	221,993	41.05%	311,023	57.52%	7,752	1.43%	-89,030	-16.47%	540,768
Blanco	5,142	75.91%	1,522	22.47%	110	1.62%	3,620	53.44%	6,774
Borden	306	96.53%	9	2.84%	2	0.63%	297	74.06%	317
Bosque	6,278	84.07%	1,099	14.72%	91	1.22%	5,179	69.35%	7,468
Bowie	20,206	75.18%	6,060	22.55%	610	2.27%	14,146	52.63%	26,876
Brazoria	64,938	59.07%	43,364	39.44%	1,634	1.49%	21,574	19.63%	109,936
Brazos	35,768	59.66%	23,103	38.53%	1,083	1.81%	12,665	21.13%	59,954
Brewster	2,014	53.52%	1,678	44.59%	71	1.89%	336	8.93%	3,763
Briscoe	539	91.05%	49	8.28%	4	0.68%	490	82.77%	592
Brooks	785	39.09%	1,204	59.96%	19	0.95%	-419	-20.87%	2,008
Brown	10,853	88.34%	1,308	10.65%	124	1.01%	9,545	77.69%	12,285
Burleson	5,506	82.03%	1,142	17.01%	64	0.95%	4,364	65.02%	6,712
Burnet	16,505	78.18%	4,337	20.54%	269	1.27%	12,168	57.64%	21,111
Caldwell	6,351	55.92%	4,790	42.17%	217	1.91%	1,561	13.75%	11,358
Calhoun	4,228	75.61%	1,292	23.10%	72	1.29%	2,936	52.51%	5,592
Callahan	4,770	90.58%	444	8.43%	52	0.99%	4,326	82.15%	4,378
Cameron	34,290	44.48%	41,667	54.05%	1,138	1.48%	-7,377	-9.57%	77,095
Camp	3,082	77.38%	863	21.67%	38	0.95%	2,219	55.71%	3,983
Carson	2,177	90.94%	183	7.64%	34	1.42%	1,994	83.30%	2,394
Cass	8,415	84.41%	1,460	14.65%	94	0.94%	6,955	69.76%	9,969
Castro	1,226	82.12%	239	16.01%	28	1.88%	987	66.11%	1,493
Chambers	12,964	82.38%	2,559	16.26%	213	1.35%	10,405	66.12%	15,736
Cherokee	12,023	83.01%	2,323	16.04%	137	0.95%	10,405	66.98%	15,736
Childress	1,562	89.21%	162	9.25%	27	1.54%	1,400	79.96%	1,751
Clay	4,052	90.22%	393	8.75%	46	1.02%	3,659	81.47%	4,491
Cochran	506	82.14%	95	15.42%	15	2.44%	411	66.72%	616
Coke	1,260	90.71%	114	8.21%	15	1.08%	1,146	82.50%	1,389
Coleman	2,942	90.83%	269	8.31%	28	0.86%	2,673	82.52%	3,239
Collin	198,236	54.31%	161,737	44.31%	5,003	1.37%	36,499	10.00%	364,976
Collingsworth	845	91.35%	75	8.11%	5	0.54%	770	83.24%	925
Colorado	6,084	80.63%	1,395	18.49%	67	0.89%	4,689	62.14%	7,546
Comal	54,503	72.90%	19,195	25.67%	1,065	1.43%	35,308	47.23%	74,763
Comanche	4,203	87.09%	567	11.75%	56	1.16%	3,636	75.34%	4,826
Concho	818	86.74%	109	11.56%	16	1.70%	709	47.227%	943
Cooke	12,815	83.62%	2,308	15.06%	202	1.32%	10,507	68.56%	15,325
Coryell	11,652	71.19%	4,450	27.19%	266	1.63%	7,202	44.00%	16,368
Cottle	453	88.13%	54	10.51%	7	1.36%	399	77.63%	514
Crane	983	85.70%	150	13.08%	14	1.22%	833	72.62%	1,147
Crockett	964	75.73%	276	21.68%	33	2.59%	688	54.05%	1,273
Crosby	990	78.95%	255	20.33%	9	0.72%	735	58.62%	1,254
Culberson	391	53.20%	328	44.63%	16	2.18%	63	8.57%	735
Dallam	391	80.95%	78	16.15%	14	2.90%	313	64.80%	483
Dallas	224,684	35.93%	392,634	62.78%	8,073	1.29%	-167,950	-26.85%	625,391
Dawson	2,088	82.99%	402	15.98%	26	1.03%	1,686	67.01%	2,516
Deaf Smith	2,281	77.40%	635	21.55%	31	1.05%	1,646	55.85%	2,947
Delta	1,711	84.41%	295	14.55%	21	1.04%	1,416	69.86%	2,027
Denton	177,017	55.70%	136,389	42.92%	4,375	1.38%	40,628	12.78%	317,781
DeWitt	5,151	84.99%	878	14.49%	32	0.53%	4,273	70.50%	6,061
Dickens	684	86.47%	98	12.39%	9	1.14%	586	74.08%	791
Dimmit	1,080	37.55%	1,757	61.09%	39	1.36%	-677	-23.54%	2,876
Donley	1,084	90.94%	97	8.14%	11	0.92%	987	82.80%	1,192
Duval	1,600	43.53%	2,018	54.90%	58	1.58%	-418	-11.37%	3,676
Eastland	5,468	88.91%	634	10.31%	48	0.78%	4,834	78.60%	6,150
Ector	19,212	75.49%	5,950	23.38%	287	1.13%	13,262	52.11%	25,449
Edwards	712	87.47%	99	12.16%	3	0.37%	613	75.31%	814
El Paso	57,573	34.80%	105,156	63.56%	2,717	1.64%	-47,583	-28.76%	165,446
Ellis	45,564	67.23%	21,338	31.49%	868	1.28%	24,226	35.74%	67,770
Erath	10,956	83.54%	1,976	15.07%	183	1.40%	8,980	68.47%	13,115
Falls	3,480	74.00%	1,168	24.84%	55	1.17%	2,312	49.16%	4,703
Fannin	9,694	83.10%	1,831	15.70%	140	1.20%	7,863	67.40%	11,665
Fayette	8,649	82.37%	1,748	16.65%	103	0.98%	6,901	65.72%	10,500
Fisher	1,172	83.65%	210	14.99%	19	1.36%	962	68.66%	1,401
Floyd	1,250	85.21%	201	13.70%	16	1.09%	1,049	71.51%	1,467
Foard	452	85.39%	69	13.09%	8	1.52%	381	72.30%	527
Fort Bend	117,249	46.89%	129,116	51.63%	3,701	1.48%	-11,867	-4.74%	250,066
Franklin	3,369	86.01%	512	13.07%	36	0.92%	2,857	72.94%	3,917
Freestone	5,600	84.07%	991	14.88%	70	1.05%	4,609	69.19%	6,661
Frio	1,872	50.22%	1,791	48.04%	65	1.74%	81	2.17%	3,728
Gaines	3,761	91.44%	311	7.56%	41	1.00%	3,450	83.88%	4,113
Galveston	68,822	62.15%	40,229	36.33%	1,683	1.52%	28,593	25.85%	110,734
Garza	1,056	88.00%	135	11.25%	9	0.75%	921	69.79%	1,200
Gillespie	10,801	80.67%	2,421	18.08%	167	1.25%	8,380	62.59%	13,389
Glasscock	542	94.76%	27	4.72%	3	0.52%	515	90.04%	572
Goliad	2,664	79.14%	663	19.70%	39	1.16%	2,001	59.44%	3,366
Gonzales	4,369	78.49%	1,129	20.28%	68	1.22%	3,240	58.21%	5,566
Gray	5,013	90.19%	478	8.60%	67	1.21%	4,535	81.59%	5,558
Grayson	34,903	77.75%	9,563	21.30%	425	0.95%	25,340	56.45%	44,891
Gregg	24,223	72.93%	8,662	26.08%	330	0.99%	15,561	46.85%	33,215
Grimes	7,607	80.65%	1,732	18.36%	93	0.99%	5,875	62.29%	9,432
Guadalupe	36,882	64.48%	19,356	33.84%	964	1.69%	17,526	30.64%	57,202
Hale	5,094	80.49%	1,165	18.41%	70	1.11%	3,929	62.08%	6,329
Hall	772	88.03%	94	10.72%	11	1.25%	678	77.31%	960
Hamilton	3,006	86.48%	433	12.46%	37	1.06%	2,573	74.02%	3,476
Hansford	1,419	93.23%	91	5.98%	12	0.79%	1,340	87.25%	1,510
Hardeman	866	87.92%	114	11.57%	5	0.51%	752	76.35%	985
Hardin	17,447	88.88%	2,035	10.37%	147	0.75%	15,412	78.51%	19,629
Harris	490,261	44.47%	595,653	54.03%	16,504	1.50%	-105,392	-9.56%	1,102,418
Harrison	16,472	77.13%	4,688	21.95%	196	0.92%	11,784	55.18%	21,356
Hartley	1,463	92.95%	96	6.10%	15	0.95%	1,367	86.85%	1,564
Haskell	1,465	87.72%	191	11.44%	14	0.84%	1,274	76.28%	1,670
Hays	39,085	43.58%	48,970	54.60%	1,628	1.82%	-9,885	-11.02%	89,683
Hemphill	1,198	88.02%	138	10.14%	25	1.84%	1,060	77.88%	1,361
Henderson	22,909	81.81%	4,798	17.14%	295	1.05%	18,111	64.68%	28,002
Hidalgo	56,783	40.22%	82,671	58.55%	1,742	1.23%	-25,888	-18.33%	141,196
Hill	9,418	82.72%	1,830	16.07%	137	1.20%	7,588	66.65%	11,385
Hockley	4,690	84.80%	786	14.21%	55	0.99%	3,904	70.58%	5,531
Hood	22,596	82.99%	4,301	15.80%	331	1.22%	18,295	67.19%	27,228
Hopkins	10,223	83.24%	1,999	16.28%	59	0.48%	8,224	66.96%	12,281
Houston	5,726	79.71%	1,399	19.47%	59	0.82%	4,327	60.23%	7,184
Howard	5,367	81.71%	1,077	16.40%	124	1.89%	4,290	65.31%	6,568
Hudspeth	606	66.89%	270	29.80%	30	3.31%	336	37.09%	906
Hunt	23,744	77.75%	6,422	21.03%	374	1.22%	17,322	56.72%	30,540
Hutchinson	5,437	89.69%	540	8.91%	85	1.40%	4,897	80.78%	6,062
Irion	618	88.92%	70	10.07%	7	1.01%	548	78.85%	695
Jack	2,744	91.68%	227	7.58%	22	0.74%	2,517	84.10%	2,993
Jackson	4,013	87.30%	550	11.96%	34	0.74%	3,463	75.34%	4,597
Jasper	9,701	85.25%	1,601	14.07%	77	0.68%	8,100	71.18%	11,379
Jeff Davis	641	61.05%	374	35.62%	35	3.33%	267	25.43%	1,050
Jefferson	34,988	56.02%	26,641	42.66%	822	1.32%	8,347	13.36%	62,451
Jim Hogg	650	42.15%	876	56.81%	16	1.04%	-226	-14.66%	1,542
Jim Wells	5,063	53.05%	4,375	45.85%	105	2.25%	688	7.20%	9,543
Johnson	42,954	76.89%	12,266	21.96%	644	1.15%	30,688	54.93%	55,864
Jones	4,349	87.12%	581	11.64%	62	1.24%	3,768	75.48%	4,349
Karnes	3,007	78.76%	776	20.32%	35	0.92%	2,231	58.44%	3,818
Kaufman	28,306	66.09%	14,024	32.74%	501	1.17%	14,282	33.35%	42,831
Kendall	17,719	78.55%	4,506	19.98%	332	1.47%	13,213	58.57%	22,557
Kenedy	109	71.24%	42	27.45%	2	1.31%	67	43.79%	153
Kent	312	89.14%	34	9.71%	4	1.14%	278	79.43%	350
Kerr	17,524	77.95%	4,648	20.68%	308	1.37%	12,876	57.27%	22,480
Kimble	1,666	88.81%	188	10.02%	22	1.17%	1,478	78.79%	1,876
King	100	97.09%	3	2.91%	0	0.00%	97	94.18%	103
Kinney	907	75.96%	258	21.61%	29	2.43%	649	54.35%	1,194
Kleberg	4,074	53.40%	3,463	45.39%	92	1.21%	611	7.71%	7,629
Knox	889	85.48%	140	13.46%	11	1.06%	749	72.02%	1,040
Lamar	12,521	81.61%	2,657	17.32%	164	1.07%	9,864	74.29%	15,342
Lamb	2,628	85.33%	419	13.60%	33	1.07%	2,209	71.72%	3,080
Lampasas	6,625	80.29%	1,502	18.20%	124	1.50%	5,123	62.09%	8,251
La Salle	761	52.96%	662	46.07%	14	0.97%	99	6.89%	1,437
Lavaca	7,380	89.90%	759	9.25%	70	0.85%	6,621	80.65%	8,209
Lee	5,108	81.31%	1,095	17.43%	79	1.26%	4,013	63.88%	6,282
Leon	5,108	86.74%	698	11.85%	83	1.41%	4,410	74.89%	5,889
Liberty	16,080	81.25%	3,488	17.62%	223	1.13%	12,592	63.63%	19,791
Limestone	5,390	78.67%	1,366	19.94%	95	1.39%	4,776	58.73%	6,851
Lipscomb	894	91.51%	69	7.06%	14	1.43%	825	84.44%	977
Live Oak	3,424	85.60%	545	13.63%	31	0.78%	2,879	71.98%	4,000
Llano	8,977	81.39%	1,920	17.41%	132	1.20%	7,057	63.98%	11,029
Loving	70	88.61%	6	7.59%	3	3.80%	64	81.02%	79
Lubbock	58,163	69.43%	24,497	29.24%	1,108	1.32%	33,666	40.19%	83,768
Lynn	1,502	86.97%	196	11.35%	28	1.68%	1,306	75.62%	1,726
Madison	3,272	83.75%	595	15.23%	40	1.02%	2,677	68.52%	3,907
Marion	2,557	77.44%	700	21.20%	45	1.36%	1,857	56.14%	3,302
Martin	1,341	88.93%	149	9.88%	18	1.19%	1,192	79.05%	1,508
Mason	1,703	85.54%	268	13.46%	20	1.01%	1,435	72.07%	1,991
Matagorda	7,350	75.61%	2,273	23.38%	98	1.01%	5,077	52.23%	9,721
Maverick	3,862	40.30%	5,555	57.97%	166	1.73%	-1,693	-17.61%	9,583
McCulloch	2,221	86.66%	314	12.25%	28	1.09%	1,907	74.40%	2,563
McLennan	47,875	65.95%	23,765	32.74%	950	2.10%	24,110	33.21%	72,590
McMullen	343	92.20%	28	7.53%	1	0.27%	315	84.67%	372
Medina	12,601	72.56%	4,591	26.44%	174	1.00%	8,010	46.12%	17,366
Menard	659	85.03%	110	14.19%	6	0.77%	549	70.84%	775
Midland	32,389	80.87%	7,154	17.86%	510	1.27%	25,235	63.01%	40,053
Milam	6,717	80.37%	1,559	18.65%	82	0.98%	5,158	61.72%	8,358
Mills	1,894	89.30%	198	9.34%	29	1.37%	1,696	79.96%	2,121
Mitchell	1,576	88.49%	185	10.39%	20	1.12%	1,391	78.10%	1,781
Montague	7,004	89.17%	765	9.74%	86	1.09%	6,239	79.43%	7,855
Montgomery	152,694	73.39%	52,654	25.31%	2,707	1.30%	100,040	48.08%	208,055
Moore	3,081	85.51%	479	13.30%	43	1.19%	2,602,	72.22%	3,603
Morris	3,041	76.10%	921	23.05%	34	0.85%	2,120	53.05%	3,996
Motley	482	95.64%	18	3.57%	4	0.79%	464	92.06%	504
Nacogdoches	13,248	69.91%	5,480	28.92%	222	1.17%	7,768	40.99%	18,950
Navarro	10,830	76.63%	3,157	22.34%	146	1.03%	7,673	54.29%	14,133
Newton	3,660	83.70%	689	15.76%	24	0.55%	2,971	67.94%	4,373
Nolan	3,093	81.33%	647	17.01%	63	1.66%	2,446	64.32%	3,803
Nueces	47,567	53.27%	40,474	45.32%	1,260	1.41%	7,093	7.95%	89,301
Ochiltree	1,975	92.90%	135	6.35%	16	0.75%	1,840	86.55%	2,126
Oldham	710	92.21%	50	6.49%	10	1.30%	660	85.72%	770
Orange	21,153	84.28%	3,722	14.83%	224	0.01%	17,431	69.45%	25,099
Palo Pinto	7,039	83.21%	1,213	15.66%	61	1.13%	5,826	67.55%	8,313
Panola	7,039	84.68%	1,213	14.59%	61	0.73%	5,826	70.08%	8,313
Parker	52,523	82.80%	10,123	15.96%	791	1.25%	42,400	66.84%	63,437
Parmer	1,546	87.44%	202	11.43%	20	1.13%	1,344	76.01%	1,768
Pecos	2,548	69.20%	1,043	28.33%	91	2.47%	1,505	40.87%	3,682
Polk	13,377	79.74%	3,229	19.25%	170	1.01%	10,148	60.49%	16,776
Potter	16,082	73.75%	5,361	24.59%	363	1.67%	10,721	49.17%	21,806
Presidio	561	32.54%	1,133	65.72%	30	1.74%	-572	-33.18%	1,724
Rains	4,339	87.01%	596	11.95%	52	1.04%	3,743	75.06%	6,528
Randall	39,243	81.72%	8,228	17.14%	548	1.14%	31,015	64.59%	48,019
Reagan	616	81.62%	90	16.67%	10	1.71%	526	64.96%	716
Real	1,337	85.21%	218	13.89%	14	0.89%	1,119	71.32%	1,569
Red River	3,482	81.47%	764	17.88%	28	0.66%	2,718	63.59%	4,274
Reeves	1,341	61.57%	801	36.78%	36	1.65%	540	24.79%	2,178
Refugio	1,658	71.59%	639	27.59%	19	0.82%	1,019	44.00%	2,316
Roberts	430	96.85%	7	1.58%	7	1.58%	423	95.27%	444
Robertson	4,643	77.16%	1,293	21.49%	81	1.35%	3,350	55.67%	6,017
Rockwall	30,211	70.43%	12,132	28.28%	550	1.28%	18,079	42.15%	42,893
Runnels	2,924	90.41%	277	8.57%	33	1.02%	2,647	81.84%	3,234
Rusk	12,762	81.66%	2,697	17.26%	169	1.08%	10,065	64.40%	15,628
Sabine	3,755	90.16%	385	9.24%	25	0.60%	3,370	80.92%	4,165
San Augustine	2,288	79.86%	546	19.06%	31	1.08%	1,742	60.80%	2,865
San Jacinto	7,882	82.54%	1,540	16.13%	127	2.00%	6,342	66.41%	9,549
San Patricio	12,028	67.20%	5,643	31.53%	227	1.27%	6,385	35.67%	17,898
San Saba	1,947	89.93%	200	9.24%	18	0.83%	1,747	80.69%	2,165
Schleicher	834	82.74%	159	15.77%	15	1.49%	834	66.97%	1,008
Scurry	3,607	87.38%	480	11.63%	41	0.99%	3,127	75.75%	4,128
Shackelford	1,148	92.66%	81	6.54%	10	0.81%	1,067	86.12%	1,239
Shelby	5,846	84.33%	1,045	15.08%	104	0.59%	4,801	69.25%	6,995
Sherman	665	93.93%	35	4.94%	8	1.13%	630	88.99%	708
Smith	56,608	74.27%	18,763	24.62%	849	1.11%	37,845	41.88%	76,220
Somervell	3,430	84.90%	553	13.69%	57	1.41%	2,877	71.21%	4,040
Starr	4,460	40.12%	6,455	58.06%	202	1.82%	-1,995	-17.94%	14,182
Stephens	2,511	91.48%	217	7.91%	17	0.62%	2,294	83.57%	2,745
Sterling	423	94.42%	20	4.46%	5	1.12%	403	89.96%	448
Stonewall	492	87.08%	70	12.39%	3	0.53%	422	74.69%	565
Sutton	970	83.48%	178	15.32%	14	1.20%	792	68.16%	1,162
Swisher	1,399	83.97%	238	14.29%	29	1.74%	1,161	69.68%	1,666
Tarrant	303,600	51.34%	279,423	47.25%	8,345	1.41%	24,177	4.09%	591,368
Taylor	30,030	76.12%	8,888	22.53%	535	1.36%	21,142	53.59%	39,453
Terrell	326	76.53%	94	22.07%	6	1.41%	232	54.46%	426
Terry	2,167	83.67%	377	14.56%	46	1.78%	1,790	69.11%	2,590
Throckmorton	612	91.75%	51	7.65%	4	0.60%	561	84.10%	667
Titus	5,701	77.86%	1,535	20.96%	86	1.18%	4,166	56.90%	7,322
Tom Green	23,873	74.96%	7,516	23.60%	458	1.44%	16,357	51.36%	31,847
Travis	119,321	25.89%	334,667	72.61%	6,911	1.50%	-215,346	-46.72%	460,979
Trinity	4,465	83.60%	825	15.45%	51	0.95%	3,640	68.15%	5,341
Tyler	6,343	87.54%	816	11.26%	87	1.20%	5,527	76.28%	7,246
Upshur	12,270	86.00%	1,856	13.01%	142	1.00%	10,414	72.99%	14,268
Upton	908	85.82%	124	11.72%	26	2.46%	784	74.10%	1,058
Uvalde	4,779	60.14%	3,048	38.36%	119	1.50%	1,731	21.78%	7,946
Val Verde	5,530	58.16%	3,814	40.11%	165	1.74%	1,716	18.05%	9,509
Van Zandt	17,773	87.21%	2,414	11.85%	192	0.94%	15,359	75.36%	20,379
Victoria	18,519	73.23%	6,452	25.51%	317	1.25%	12,067	39.69%	25,288
Walker	12,309	70.78%	4,861	27.95%	220	1.27%	7,448	42.83%	17,390
Waller	11,381	68.13%	5,100	30.53%	223	1.34%	6,281	37.60%	16,704
Ward	2,065	82.01%	418	16.60%	35	1.39%	1,647	65.41%	2,518
Washington	10,965	78.48%	2,824	20.21%	183	1.31%	8,141	58.27%	13,972
Webb	16,409	36.70%	27,156	60.73%	1,151	2.57%	-10,747	-24.03%	44,716
Wharton	9,354	76.96%	2,697	22.19%	103	0.85%	6,657	54.77%	12,154
Wheeler	1,569	93.06%	103	6.11%	14	0.83%	1,466	86.95%	1,686
Wichita	23,328	73.75%	7,824	24.74%	479	1.51%	15,504	49.01%	31,631
Wilbarger	2,606	82.68%	517	16.40%	29	0.92%	2,493	66.28%	3,152
Willacy	1,656	43.13%	2,138	55.68%	46	1.20%	-482	-12.55%	3,840
Williamson	111,488	49.43%	110,242	48.88%	3,823	1.69%	1,246	0.55%	225,553
Wilson	14,952	76.81%	4,317	22.18%	197	1.01%	10,635	54.63%	19,466
Winkler	1,130	85.54%	177	13.40%	14	1.06%	953	72.14%	1,321
Wise	21,979	85.12%	3,538	13.70%	304	1.18%	18,441	71.42%	25,821
Wood	15,678	86.27%	2,331	12.83%	164	0.90%	13,347	73.44%	18,173
Yoakum	1,427	87.23%	190	11.61%	19	1.16%	1,237	75.61%	1,636
Young	5,498	88.76%	630	10.17%	66	1.07%	4,868	78.58%	6,194
Zapata	1,817	52.77%	1,585	46.04%	41	1.19%	232	6.73%	3,443
Zavala	780	31.84%	1,642	67.02%	28	1.14%	-862	-35.18%	2,450
Totals	4,435,558	54.75%	3,553,656	43.86%	112,780	1.39%	881,902	10.88%	8,101,994

==== Counties that flipped from Democratic to Republican ====
- Culberson (largest city: Van Horn)
- Zapata (largest city: Zapata)

==== Counties that flipped from Republican to Democratic ====
- Fort Bend (largest city: Sugar Land)

==== By congressional district ====
Abbott won 25 of 38 congressional districts.

District	Abbott	O'Rourke	Representative
1st	77%	22%	Louie Gohmert (117th Congress)
1st	77%	22%	Nathaniel Moran (118th Congress)
2nd	62%	36%	Dan Crenshaw
3rd	59%	39%	Van Taylor (117th Congress)
3rd	59%	39%	Keith Self (118th Congress)
4th	66%	33%	Pat Fallon
5th	63%	35%	Lance Gooden
6th	65%	34%	Jake Ellzey
7th	35%	63%	Lizzie Fletcher
8th	67%	32%	Kevin Brady (117th Congress)
8th	67%	32%	Morgan Luttrell (118th Congress)
9th	23%	76%	Al Green
10th	61%	37%	Michael McCaul
11th	74%	25%	August Pfluger
12th	60%	39%	Kay Granger
13th	75%	24%	Ronny Jackson
14th	66%	32%	Randy Weber
15th	52%	46%	Vicente Gonzalez (117th Congress)
15th	52%	46%	Monica De La Cruz (118th Congress)
16th	35%	64%	Veronica Escobar
17th	65%	34%	Pete Sessions
18th	25%	73%	Sheila Jackson Lee
19th	77%	22%	Jodey Arrington
20th	32%	66%	Joaquín Castro
21st	61%	38%	Chip Roy
22nd	59%	39%	Troy Nehls
23rd	54%	44%	Tony Gonzales
24th	58%	41%	Beth Van Duyne
25th	68%	31%	Roger Williams
26th	61%	37%	Michael Burgess
27th	64%	35%	Michael Cloud
28th	46%	52%	Henry Cuellar
29th	30%	68%	Sylvia Garcia
30th	22%	77%	Eddie Bernice Johnson (117th Congress)
30th	22%	77%	Jasmine Crockett (118th Congress)
31st	61%	37%	John Carter
32nd	34%	64%	Colin Allred
33rd	26%	73%	Marc Veasey
34th	43%	56%	Mayra Flores (117th Congress)
34th	43%	56%	Vicente Gonzalez (118th Congress)
35th	26%	73%	Lloyd Doggett (117th Congress)
35th	26%	73%	Greg Casar (118th Congress)
36th	67%	31%	Brian Babin
37th	21%	77%	Lloyd Doggett
38th	61%	38%	Wesley Hunt

== Analysis ==
Map of MECE (mutually exclusive and collectively exhaustive) partition of Texas into 12 regions

Texas Democrats hoped for Beto O'Rourke to achieve an upset over the incumbent Greg Abbott, which did not materialize. Abbott won by 10.9%, down from 13.3% in 2018. Abbott's margin was slightly larger than aggregate polling, but virtually in line with the last poll conducted. He won the vast majority of counties (235 out of 254), mostly rural, and by significant margins. In particular, 34 counties, mainly in West Texas and the Texas panhandle, gave Abbott over 90% of the vote. This was the most by any Texas Republican gubernatorial candidate, and the most for any candidate since Democrat Allan Shivers' 1954 re-election.

Abbott won the three largest metro areas in the state, which include Dallas–Fort Worth–Arlington in North Texas, Houston–The Woodlands–Sugar Land in Southeast Texas, and San Antonio–New Braunfels in South-Central Texas. He also won all of the state's mid-sized metro areas outside of the Rio Grande Valley, which include Corpus Christi along the coastal bend; Waco, Killeen–Temple–Fort Hood, and Bryan–College Station in Central Texas; Beaumont–Port Arthur, Tyler and Longview in East Texas; Lubbock, Abilene, and Midland-Odessa in West Texas; and Amarillo in the Panhandle. Abbott also won an urban county, Tarrant, home to Fort Worth and did well in the suburban counties of the Texas Triangle, winning Brazoria, Galveston, and Montgomery counties around Houston; Comal and Guadalupe around San Antonio; Collin, Denton, Ellis, Kaufman, and Rockwall in the Dallas-Fort Worth metroplex; and Williamson in Greater Austin.

In DFW and Austin specifically, Republican strength had declined somewhat in these metros, with Abbott carrying Collin, Denton, Tarrant, and Williamson by 10.07%, 12.81%, 4.11%, and 0.62% respectively, down from his margins of 19.48%, 20.60%, 10.64%, and 10.71% from 2018. Excluding the largest metro areas, Abbott improved on his 2018 margins.

O'Rourke, despite his loss, did best in most of Texas's urban centers. He carried Travis, home to the state capital Austin (72.6%-25.9%), his best performance in the state; El Paso, his home county, 63.4%-35%; Dallas (62.8%-35.9%); Bexar, home to San Antonio (57.5%-41.1%); and Harris, home to Houston (54%-44.5%). He also carried Hays, a rapidly growing county south of Austin which contains San Marcos and Texas State University along with fast-growing cities of Kyle, and Buda by 54.5%-43.7%. Despite improving on 2018 nominee Lupe Valdez's margins in these counties, he did worse in all of them compared to his Senate campaign in 2018, and, excluding Travis and Hays, worse than Joe Biden in the 2020 presidential race. The only county O'Rourke flipped was suburban Fort Bend outside Houston, which voted for Abbott by 0.2% in 2018, but voted for O'Rourke by 4.68% in this election.

Outside the Texas Triangle and Trans Pecos, the only other area O'Rourke won was heavily Hispanic South Texas along the U.S. border with Mexico. His performance was worse than Valdez's and his own from 2018, which continued the trend of rural Hispanic voters away from the Democrats towards Republicans, but he did outperform Biden from 2020. Counties that voted for Biden by single digits like Duval (2.61%), Starr (5%), and Maverick (9.45%); voted for O'Rourke 11.02%, 17.85%, and 17.68% respectively. Despite this improvement from the 2020 presidential race, Abbott flipped two heavily Hispanic counties, Zapata and Culberson (in the Trans Pecos).

Exit polls according to NBC News showed Abbott winning male (58%-41%) and female voters (51%-48%), whites (66%-33%), and other races (67%-31%), voters over 45 (60%-39%), college graduates (52%-47%) and non-college graduates (56%-43%), and voters who denied the results of the 2020 presidential election (94%-5%). O'Rourke won black voters (84%-15%), Latinos (57%-40%), Asians (52%-48%), voters between 18 and 44 (54%-44%), Independents (49%-47%) and moderates (60%-38%).

Fox News Voter Analysis exit polls showed Abbott winning male (59%-39%) and female voters (51%-48%); whites (68%-30%) and other races and ethnicities (53%-42%); voters over 45 (61%-37%); college graduates (54%-44%), non-college graduates (56%-43%); white men (70%-28%); white women (67%-32%). O'Rourke won African Americans (81%-18%), Latinos (56%-42%); African American men (76%-24%); African American women (85%-13%) Latino men (55%-45%) and Latina women (61%-37%).

=== Voter demographics ===
Voter demographic data was collected by CNN. The voter survey is based on exit polls. There were 4,327 total respondents.

2022 Texas gubernatorial election (CNN)
Demographic subgroup	Abbott	O'Rourke	% of total vote
Ideology
Liberals	10	89	22
Moderates	38	60	36
Conservatives	91	9	42
Party
Democrats	3	97	30
Republicans	95	5	41
Independents	47	49	29
Age
18–24 years old	31	67	9
25–29 years old	39	61	6
30–39 years old	47	50	15
40–49 years old	53	45	16
50–64 years old	61	38	27
65 and older	62	37	27
Gender
Men	58	41	49
Women	51	48	51
Marital status
Married	63	36	63
Unmarried	45	54	37
Gender by marital status
Married men	64	35	33
Married women	61	38	29
Unmarried men	49	49	17
Unmarried women	42	58	21
Race/ethnicity
White	66	33	62
Black	15	84	12
Latino	40	57	21
Asian	48	52	3
Other	67	31	2
Gender by race
White men	69	30	30
White women	64	36	32
Black men	22	78	6
Black women	9	90	6
Latino men	45	53	10
Latina women	36	62	11
Other racial/ethnic groups	57	42	5
Education
Never attended college	60	40	12
Some college education	53	45	28
Associate degree	57	41	15
Bachelor's degree	54	44	26
Advanced degree	49	50	18
Education by race
White college graduates	60	39	31
White no college degree	72	27	31
Non-white college graduates	34	65	14
Non-white no college degree	35	63	25
Education by gender/race
White women with college degrees	57	42	15
White women without college degrees	70	29	17
White men with college degrees	63	36	16
White men without college degrees	75	24	14
Non-white	35	64	39
Issue regarded as most important
Crime	58	36	11
Inflation	76	22	28
Immigration	88	12	15
Gun policy	32	67	12
Abortion	19	80	27
Abortion should be
Legal	23	75	54
Illegal	92	7	43
First-time midterm election voter
Yes	43	57	14
No	55	44	86
2020 presidential vote
Trump	97	2	50
Biden	4	96	41
Other	N/A	N/A	3
Did not vote	N/A	N/A	5
Biden legitimately won in 2020
Yes	25	74	54
No	94	5	42
Area type
Urban	49	50	42
Suburban	56	43	47
Rural	66	32	11

== See also ==
- 2022 United States House of Representatives elections in Texas
- 2022 United States gubernatorial elections
- 2022 Texas State Senate election
- 2022 Texas House of Representatives election
- 2022 Texas elections

== Notes ==
Partisan clients
