= Examiner =

Examiner or The Examiner may refer to:

== Occupations ==
- Bank examiner, a kind of auditor
- Examiner (Roman Catholicism), a type of office in the Roman Catholic Church
- Examinership, a concept in Irish law
- Medical examiner
- Patent examiner
- Trademark examiner, an attorney employed by a government entity

== Newspapers ==
=== Australia ===
- The Examiner (Kiama, New South Wales), a newspaper published in Kiama, New South Wales
- Examiner Newspapers, newspaper publisher in Perth, Western Australia
- The Examiner (Tasmania), a daily paper in Launceston, Tasmania
- The Daily Examiner, local newspaper in Grafton, New South Wales

=== Canada ===
- Westmount Examiner, a newspaper in Westmount, Quebec
- The Examiner (Toronto), a newspaper founded by Francis Hincks
- Barrie Examiner, a newspaper in Barrie, Ontario, 1864–2017

=== United Kingdom ===
- The Examiner (1710–1714), an early 18th-century journal with contributions by Jonathan Swift
- The Examiner (1808–1886), a weekly paper founded by Leigh and John Hunt in London
- Huddersfield Daily Examiner, a local newspaper in Huddersfield, Yorkshire

=== United States ===
- The Baltimore Examiner, a newspaper in Baltimore, Maryland
- The Examiner (Beaumont), a weekly paper in Beaumont, Texas
- The Examiner (Brooklyn), a Jewish weekly published from 1955 to 1956
- The Examiner (Missouri), in Independence, Missouri
- The Examiner, a morning newspaper merged into the Los Angeles Herald Examiner in 1962
- The San Francisco Examiner, a newspaper in San Francisco, California
- Lake County Examiner in Lake County, Oregon
- The Examiner (New York)

=== Other ===
- Irish Examiner in Cork, Ireland
- IT Examiner, an information technology magazine based in India

== Websites ==
- Examiner.com, a network of websites publishing articles by citizen journalists
- The Washington Examiner, a political journalism website and weekly magazine
