= NCBI (disambiguation) =

NCBI or National Center for Biotechnology Information is part of the US National Institutes of Health.

NCBI may also refer to:

- National Coalition Building Institute
- National Council for the Blind of Ireland
