= Mike Martinez =

American politician (born 1969)

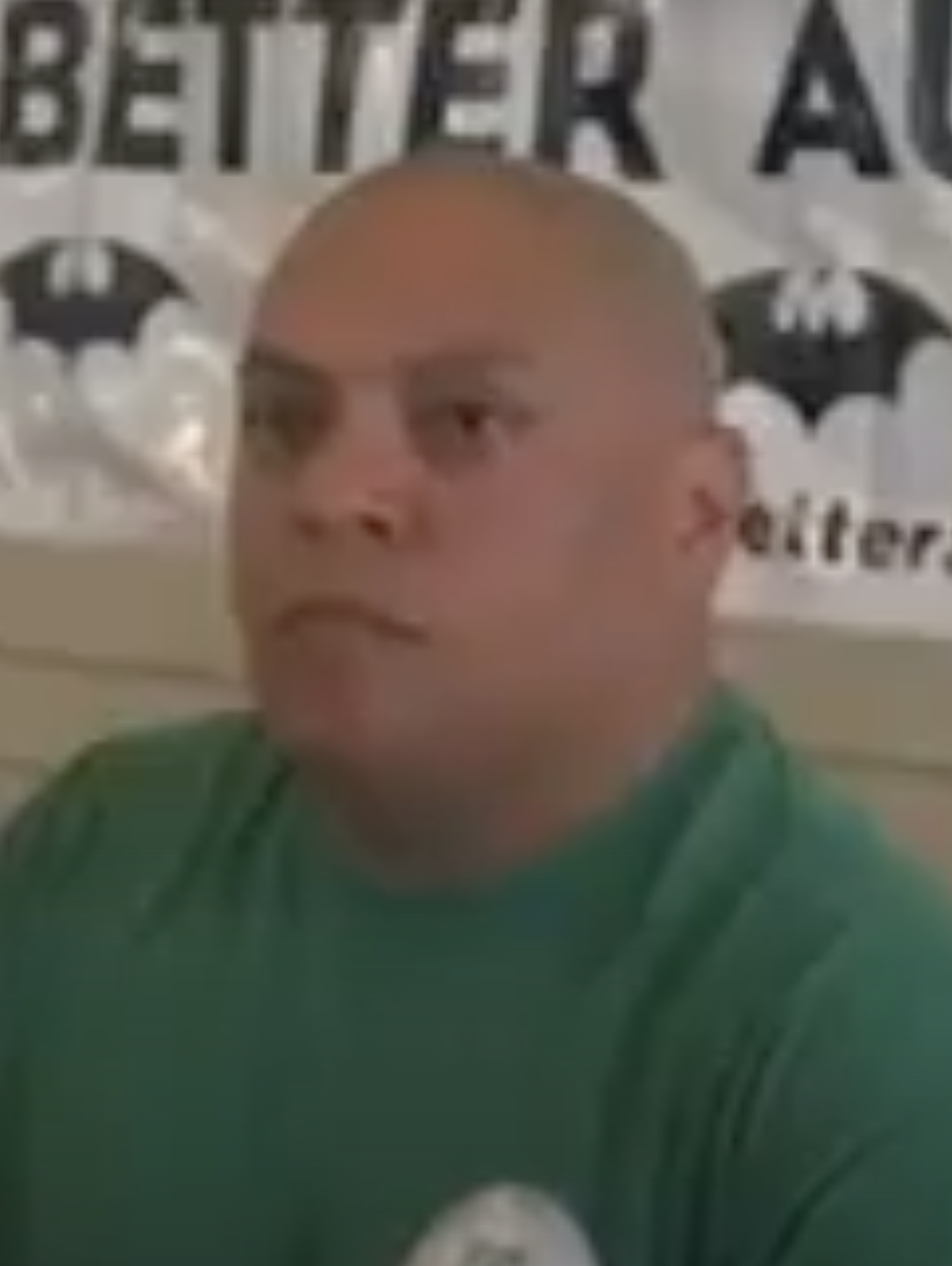
- Born: August 1, 1969 (age 56)
- Occupation: Politician
- Known for: Austin City Council Member
- Spouse: Lara Wendler

Michael W. Martinez (August 1, 1969) is a former Austin City Council member and former mayoral candidate in Austin, Texas. He served as the Board Chair of the Capital Metropolitan Transportation Authority (CapMetro), the Minority-Owned and Women-Owned Business Enterprise and Small Business Council Subcommittee. Martinez was a member of the Judicial Committee, Public Health and Human Services Subcommittee and was on the CapMetro board of directors. He has served on the board of directors of Big Brothers Big Sisters of Central Texas and worked as a diversity trainer with the National Coalition Building Institute.

Martinez previously worked for the Austin Fire Department and was head of the firefighter's union. He graduated from Leadership Austin and completed the LBJ School of Public Affairs West Point Military Leadership Program; however, he has never served in the military. Martinez has never received a college degree.

== Early life ==
Martinez grew up in Rockdale, Texas, a city 65 miles northeast of Austin, Texas.

== Career ==
=== Austin Fire Department ===
Martinez began working for the Austin Fire Department in October 1992. In 1993, he served as a Drill and Ceremony team member of the Austin Fire Department's Honor Guard. He was Chair of the Austin Firefighters Association Political Action Committee from 2001 to 2004. Martinez was elected president of the Austin Firefighters Association in 2003. During his term as president, he helped secure collective bargaining rights for firefighters and a pay raise that made Austin firefighters among the highest paid in Texas.

=== Capital Metropolitan Transportation Authority ===
In June 2007, he joined the Capital Metropolitan Transportation Authority's board of directors. Martinez became the board chairman in February 2010.

=== Political ===
Martinez became an Austin City Council member in June 2006. That December, he sponsored a resolution to preserve Oak Springs in East Austin from development. In January 2007, Martinez sponsored an ordinance to create a Homestead Preservation District that aimed to reduce the effects of rising values by using a portion of increased property taxes to fund affordable housing in East Austin. In 2009, Mike Martinez was the lead sponsor on a city ordinance that banned the use of mobile devices while driving.

In April 2014, Martinez launched his campaign for the 2014 Austin mayoral election. In August, he supported an Austin City Council resolution that would help create more solar energy for Austin Energy consumers. That September, Martinez supported Austin City Council member Kathie Tovo's proposal to give Austin homeowners a $5,000 cut through a general homestead exemption.

Martinez advanced to a run-off by placing second in the November 4, 2014 general election after the leading voter getter, Steve Adler, failed to achieve a majority of the vote. In the run-off election held on December 16, 2014, Martinez was defeated by Adler by a total of 52,125 (67%) to 25,610 (33%).

=== Business ===
In 2015, Martinez joined the affordable housing startup Kasita as head of Government and Community Affairs. Martinez also serves as Diversity Advocate at Kasita.

=== Electoral history ===
2014 Austin Mayoral Run-Off Election
Party	Candidate	Votes	%
Nonpartisan	Steve Adler	52,125	67
Nonpartisan	Mike Martinez	25,610	33

2012 Austin City Council Place 2
Party	Candidate	Votes	%
Nonpartisan	Mike Martinez	26,462	55.5
Nonpartisan	Laura Pressley	21,196	44.5

2006 Austin City Council Place 2
Party	Candidate	Votes	%
Nonpartisan	Mike Martinez	26,028	56.6
Nonpartisan	Eliza May	12,071	26.3
Nonpartisan	Wes Benedict	7,882	17.1

2009 Austin City Council Place 2
Party	Candidate	Votes	%
Nonpartisan	Mike Martinez	43,725	85
Nonpartisan	Jose Quintero	7,746	15

== Personal life ==
Mike Martinez lives in a newly built East Austin home with his wife, Lara Wendler and his two children.

== Awards ==
The Austin Chronicle named Mike Martinez the "Best Council Member" in 2008, 2009, 2010 and 2012.

== Controversy ==
=== Council emails ===
In February 2011 it was reported that Martinez had referred to City Manager Marc Ott and an assistant council member as "jokes" in an email exchange with Austin Mayor Lee Leffingwell. Martinez apologized for his comments the following day. One day later, the Austin chapter of The National Association for the Advancement of Colored People filed ethics complaints against Martinez and Leffingwell. The City of Austin Ethics Review Commission dismissed the NAACP complaints in April 2011.

In an initial response to an early 2011 public information request for email exchanges between Austin City Council members, Mike Martinez's office released fewer than a dozen emails. Later, Martinez acknowledged that his office did not release all emails pursuant to the request and accepted for responsibility for the "oversight."

=== Open meetings ===
In April 2011, Capital Metro released 3,000 emails pursuant to a request by the Travis County attorney to determine whether or not the Capital Metro board was meeting in small groups to avoid a quorum.

According to the Austin American Statesman, there was "scant" evidence of this.

Martinez in his role as Council Member was under criminal investigation for sending e-mails in violation of the Open Meetings Act. In order to avoid criminal prosecution, Martinez had to enter into a compliance agreement with prosecutors. While under criminal investigation, he was charged $24,657.50 in legal fees which was covered with taxpayer funds.
