= 2014 Austin mayoral election =

- November 4, 2014 (first round); December 16, 2014 (runoff)
- Turnout: 33.83% ▲ (first round); 15.37% ▼ (runoff)
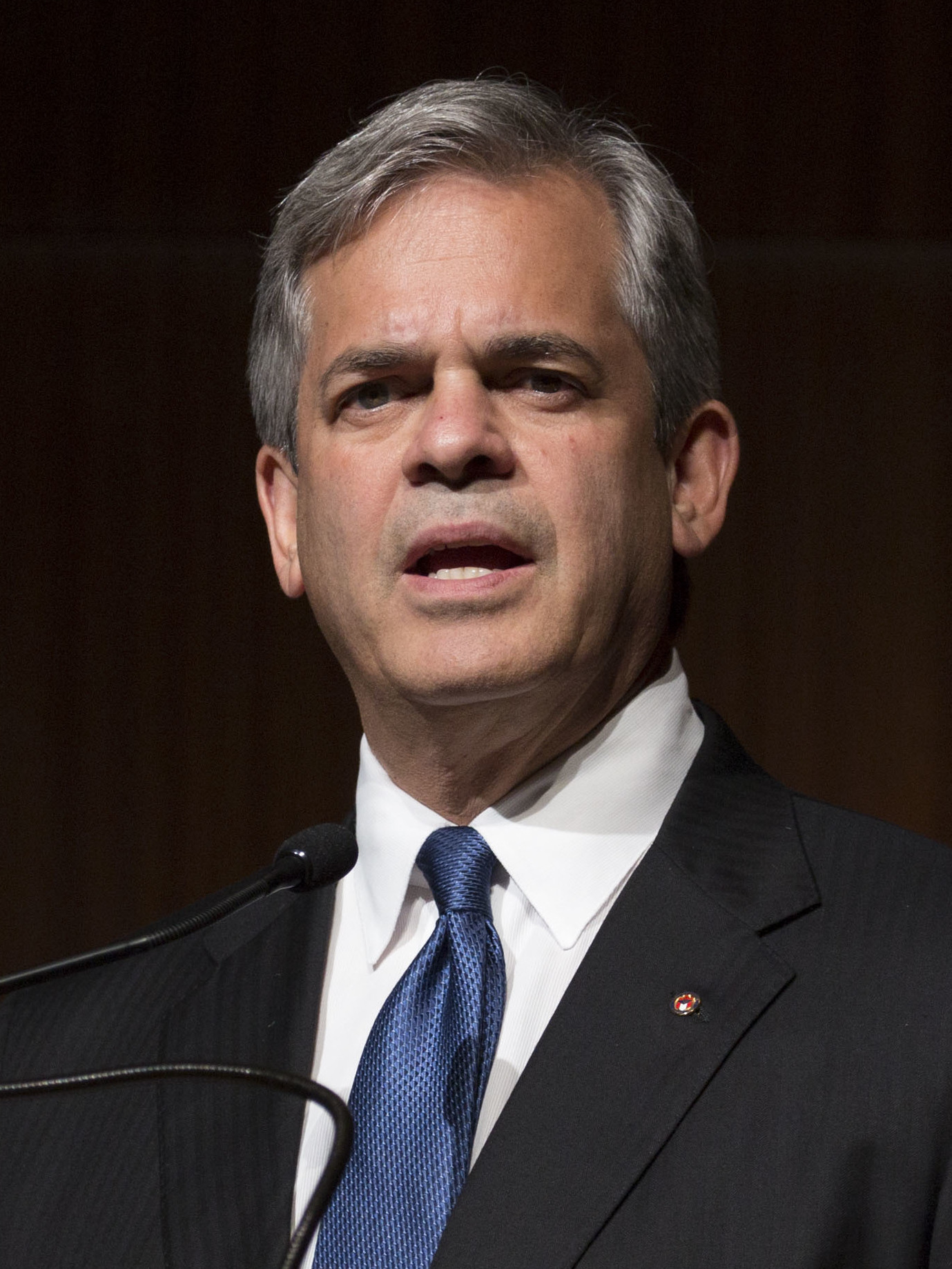

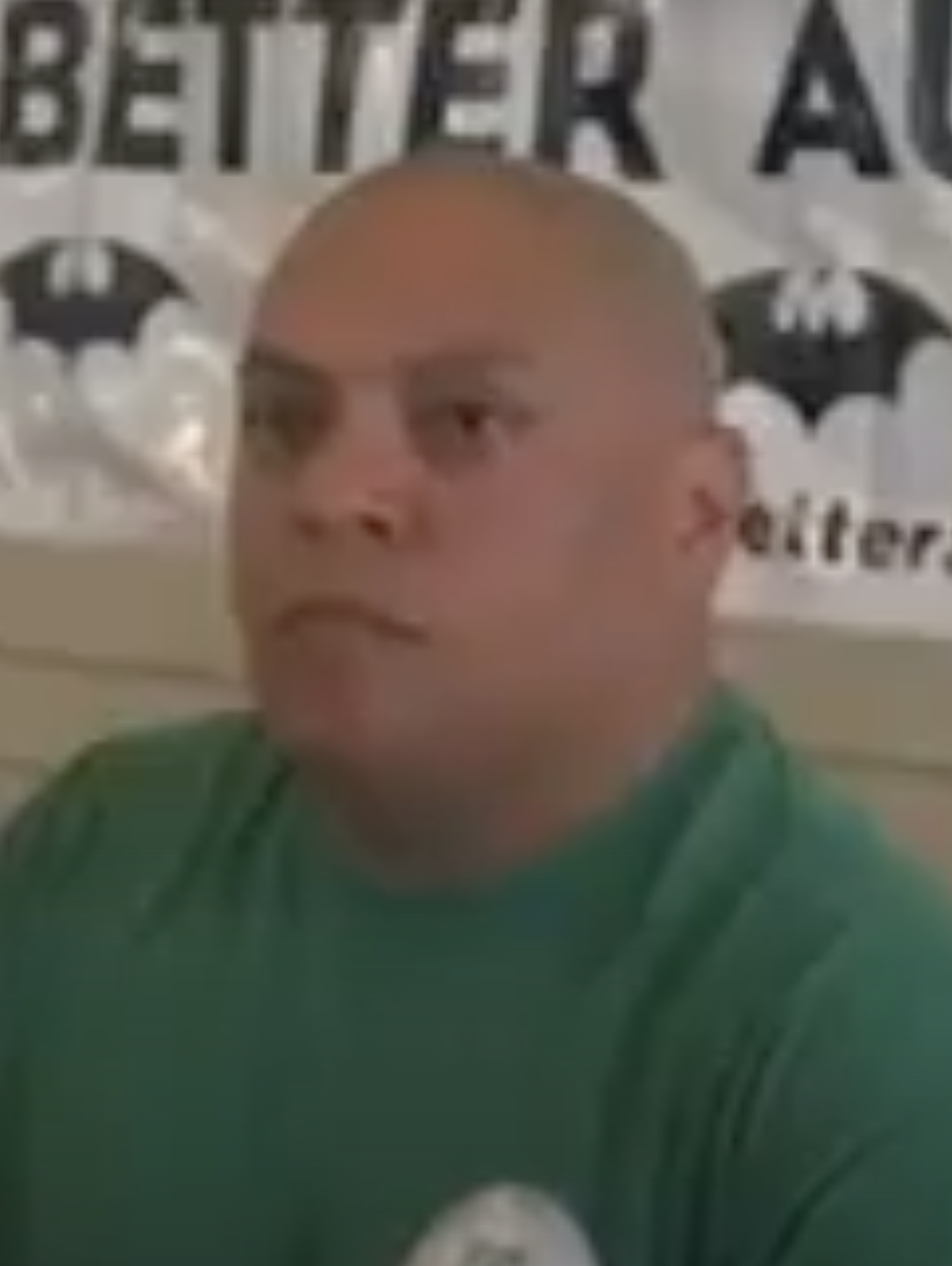

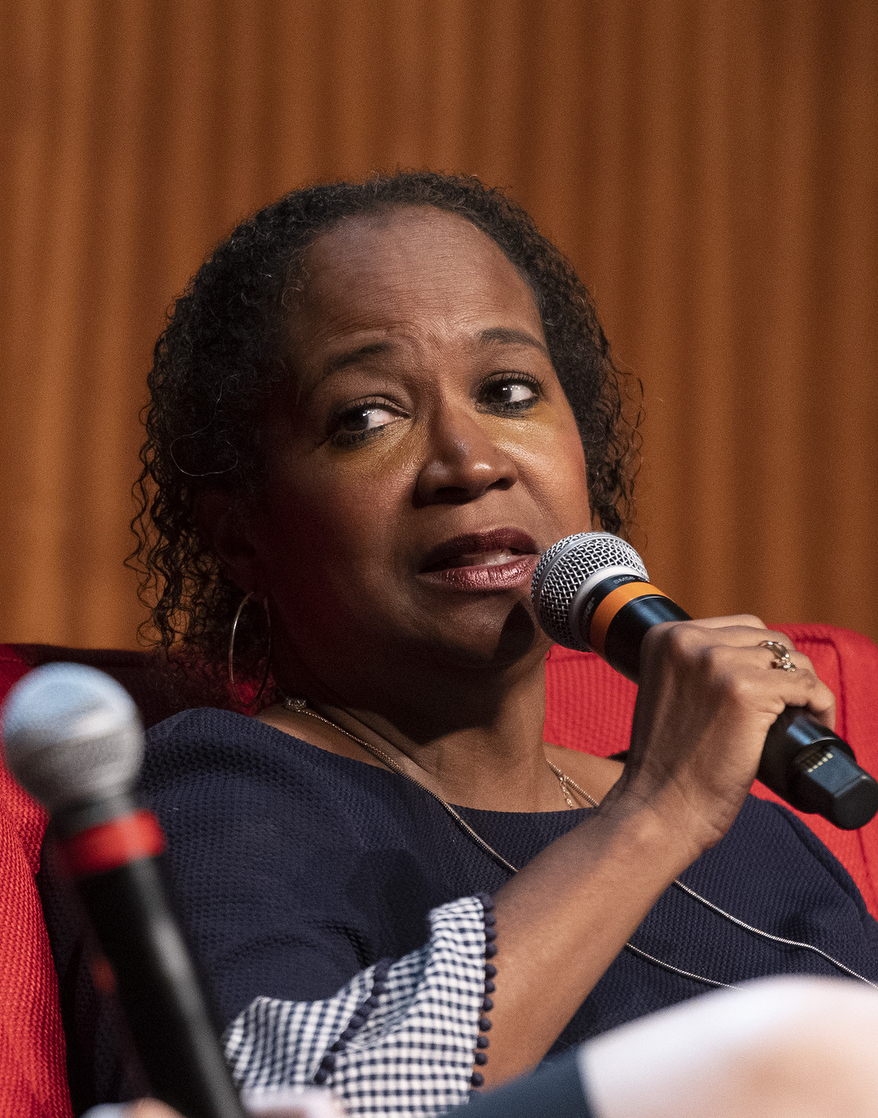

Candidate	Steve Adler	Mike Martinez
First round vote	64,416	51,892
First round percentage	36.77%	29.62%
Runoff vote	52,159	25,639
Runoff percentage	67.04%	32.96%
Candidate	Sheryl Cole	Todd Phelps
First round vote	25,846	17,333
First round percentage	14.76%	9.90%
Mayor before election
Lee Leffingwell
Elected mayor
Steve Adler

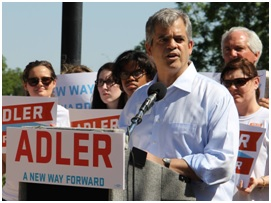
Adler launching his candidacy

The 2014 Austin mayoral election was held on November 4 and December 16, 2014, to elect the mayor of Austin, Texas. It saw the election of Steve Adler.

This was the first election held according to the new schedule in which elections are held every four years during the United States midterm election.

== Election results ==
=== First round ===
First round results
Candidate	Votes	%
Steve Adler	64,416	36.77
Mike Martinez	51,892	29.62
Sheryl Cole	25,846	14.76
Todd Phelps	17,333	9.90
Mary Catherine Krenek	7,370	4.21
David Orshalick	3,746	2.14
Randall Stephens	3,204	1.83
Ronald Culver	1,358	0.78
Turnout	175,165	%

=== Runoff ===
Runoff results
Candidate	Votes	%
Steve Adler	52,159	67.04
Mike Martinez	25,639	32.96
Turnout	77,798	%
