= 2018 Austin mayoral election =

- November 6, 2018
- Turnout: 41.73% ▲
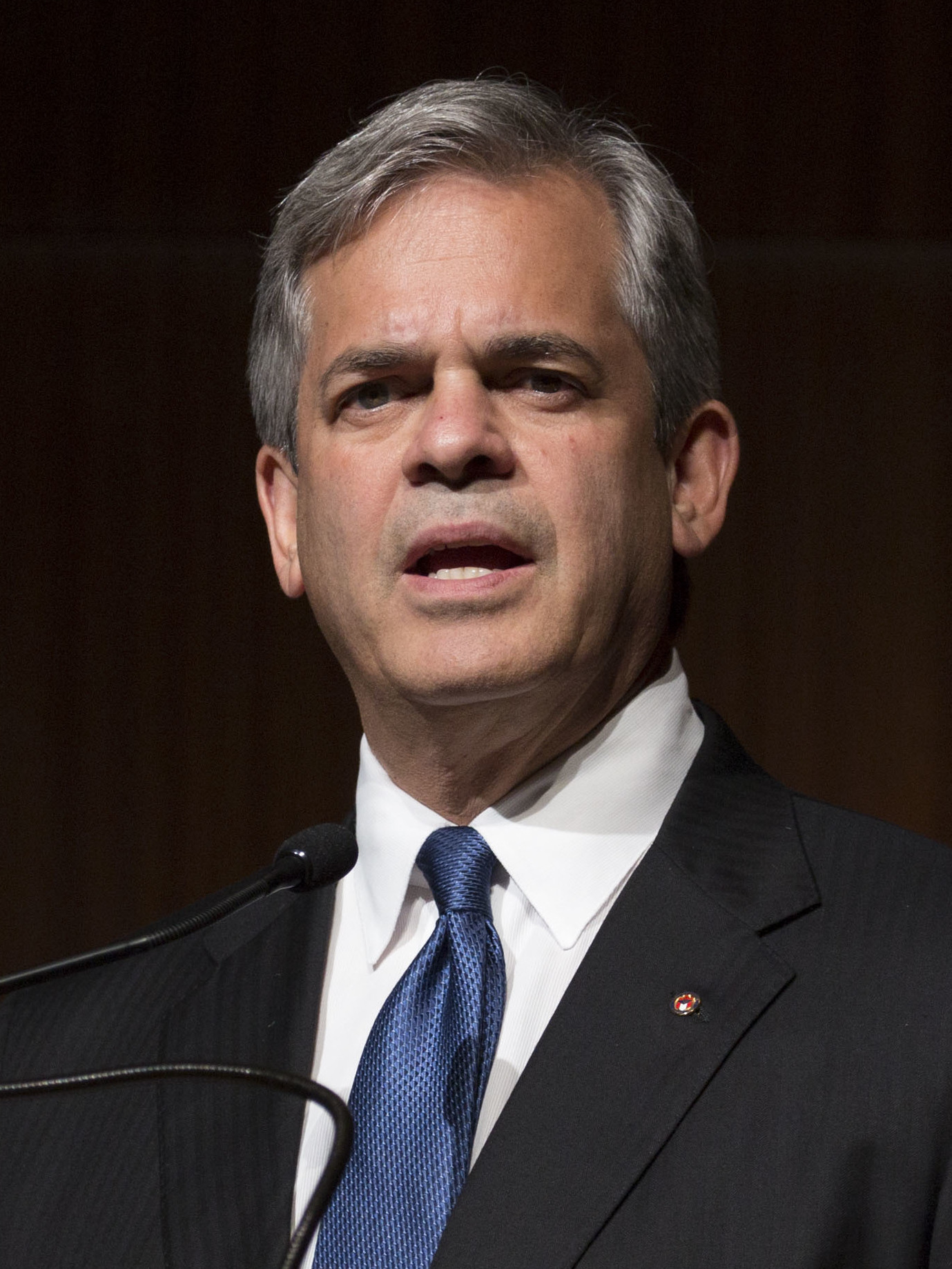

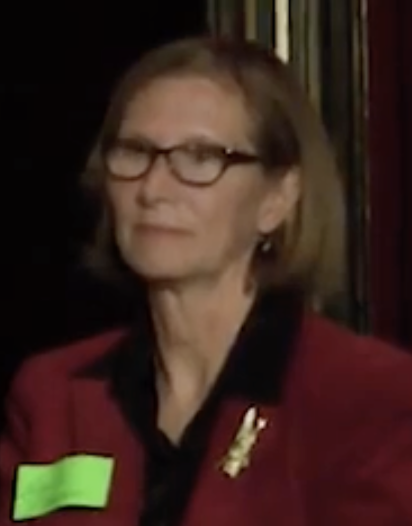
Candidate	Steve Adler	Laura Morrison
Popular vote	171,198	56,110
Percentage	59.15%	19.39%
Candidate	Gustavo Peña	Todd Phelps
Popular vote	32,519	18,323
Percentage	11.23%	6.33%
Mayor before election
Steve Adler
Elected mayor
Steve Adler

The 2018 Austin mayoral election was held on November 6, 2018, to elect the mayor of Austin, Texas. The election was a non-partisan mayoral election. If a candidate received a majority of the votes (50%+1 or greater), the candidate was elected, otherwise a runoff would be held between the top two candidates with the most votes. As incumbent Steve Adler secured a majority in the first round, a runoff was not required, and Adler was re-elected mayor for a second term.

== Campaign ==
Adler entered the election with a strong fundraising advantage over his challengers.

Adler's most formidable challenger was perceived to be former Austin City Council member Laura Morrison. Morrison had been a prominent critic of CodeNEXT (a shelved effort to rewrite the city's land development code) and the deal Adler was offering to bring a Major League Soccer team to the city.

== Election results ==
Results
Candidate	Votes	%
Steve Adler (incumbent)	171,198	59.15
Laura Morrison	56,110	19.39
Gustavo "Gus" Peña	32,519	11.23
Todd Phelps	18,323	6.33
Travis Duncan	6,532	2.26
Alexander Strenger	2,860	0.99
Alan Pease	1,908	0.66
Turnout	289,450	%
