= 2009 Austin mayoral election =

- May 9, 2009
- Turnout: 13.02%
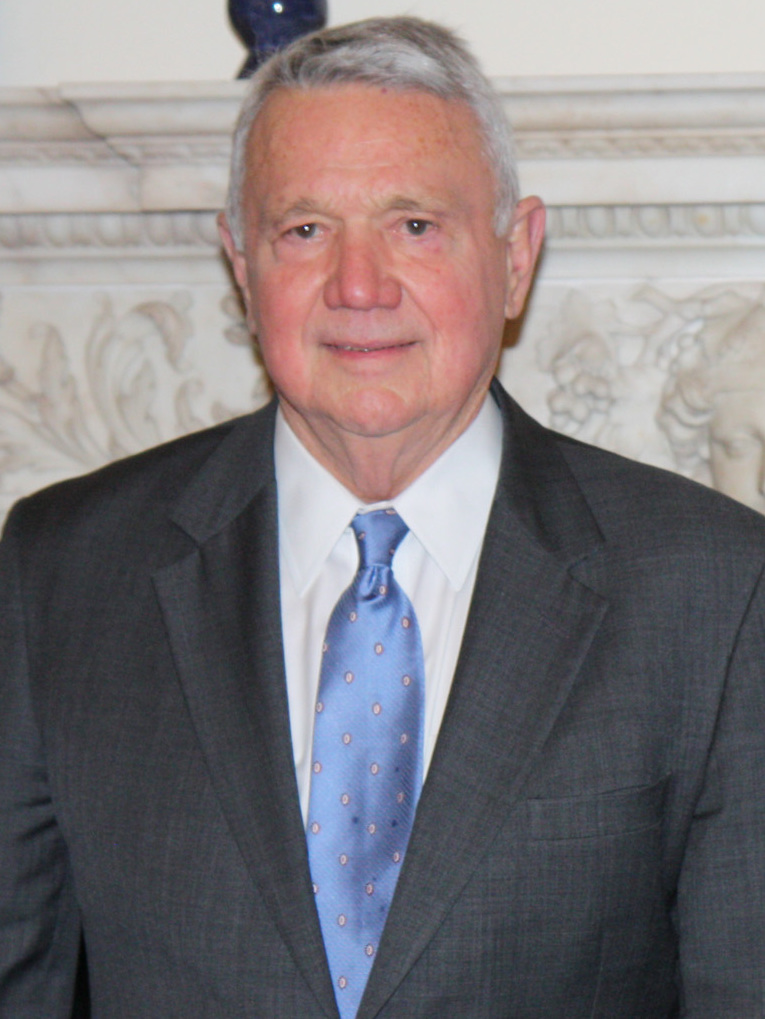

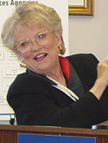
Candidate	Lee Leffingwell	Brewster McCracken	Carole Keeton Strayhorn
Popular vote	27,500	15,613	12,482
Percentage	47.23%	26.81%	21.44%
Mayor before election
Will Wynn
Elected mayor
Lee Leffingwell

The 2009 Austin mayoral election was held on May 9, 2009. Incumbent Mayor Will Wynn was term-limited. No candidate received a majority of the vote, which would have precipitated a runoff election, but second-place finisher Brewster McCracken withdrew from the race making Lee Leffingwell the winner by default.

== Candidates ==
- David Buttross
- Josiah James Ingalls
- Lee Leffingwell - Austin City Councilman
- Brewster McCracken - Austin City Councilman
- Carole Keeton Strayhorn - former Austin mayor, former Texas Comptroller, 2006 Independent gubernatorial candidate

== Forum ==
2009 Austin mayoral election candidate forum
No.	Date	Host	Moderator	Link	Nonpartisan	Nonpartisan	Nonpartisan	Nonpartisan	Nonpartisan
Key: P Participant A Absent N Not invited I Invited W Withdrawn									
Key: P Participant A Absent N Not invited I Invited W Withdrawn					David Buttross	Josiah Ingalls	Lee Leffingwell	Brewster McCracken	Carole Keeton Strayhorn
1	Oct. 5, 2022	Austin American-Statesman; KLRU; KUT	Bruce Hight	YouTube	P	P	P	P	P

== Election results ==
2009 Austin Mayoral election
Party	Candidate	Votes	%	±%
Nonpartisan	Lee Leffingwell	27,500	47.23	
Nonpartisan	Brewster McCracken	15,613	26.81	
Nonpartisan	Carole Keeton Strayhorn	12,482	21.44	
Nonpartisan	David Buttross	2,230	3.83	
Nonpartisan	Josiah James Ingalls	403	0.69	
Turnout		58,228		
