= 2012 Austin mayoral election =

- May 12, 2012
- Turnout: 10.60% ▼
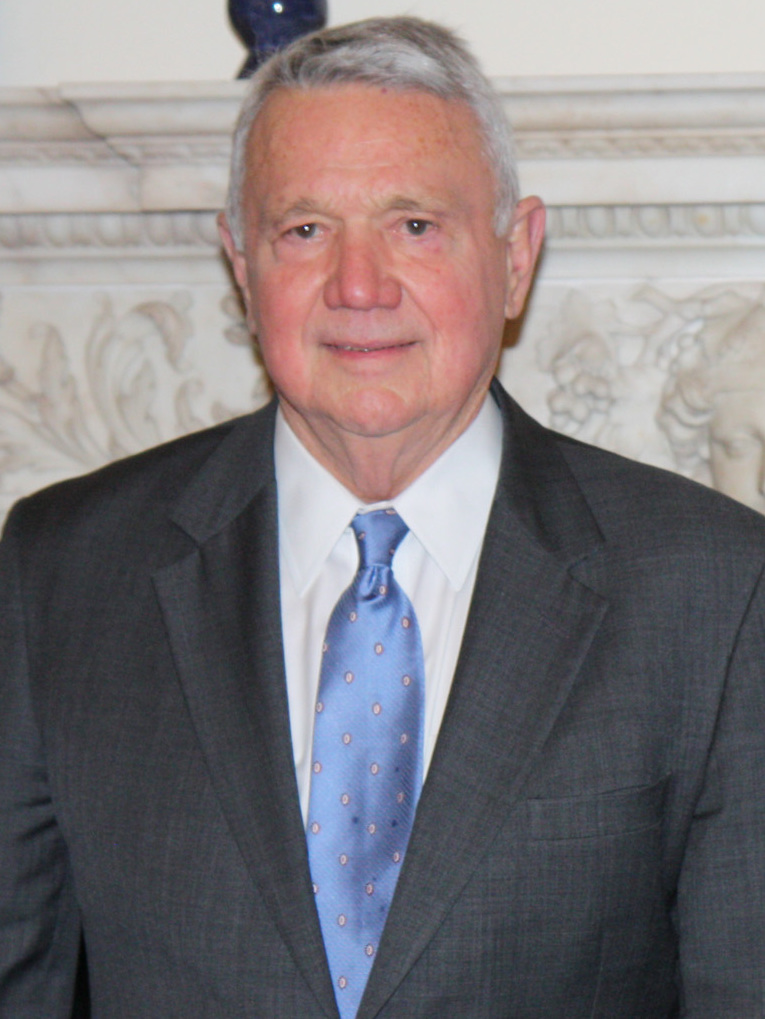

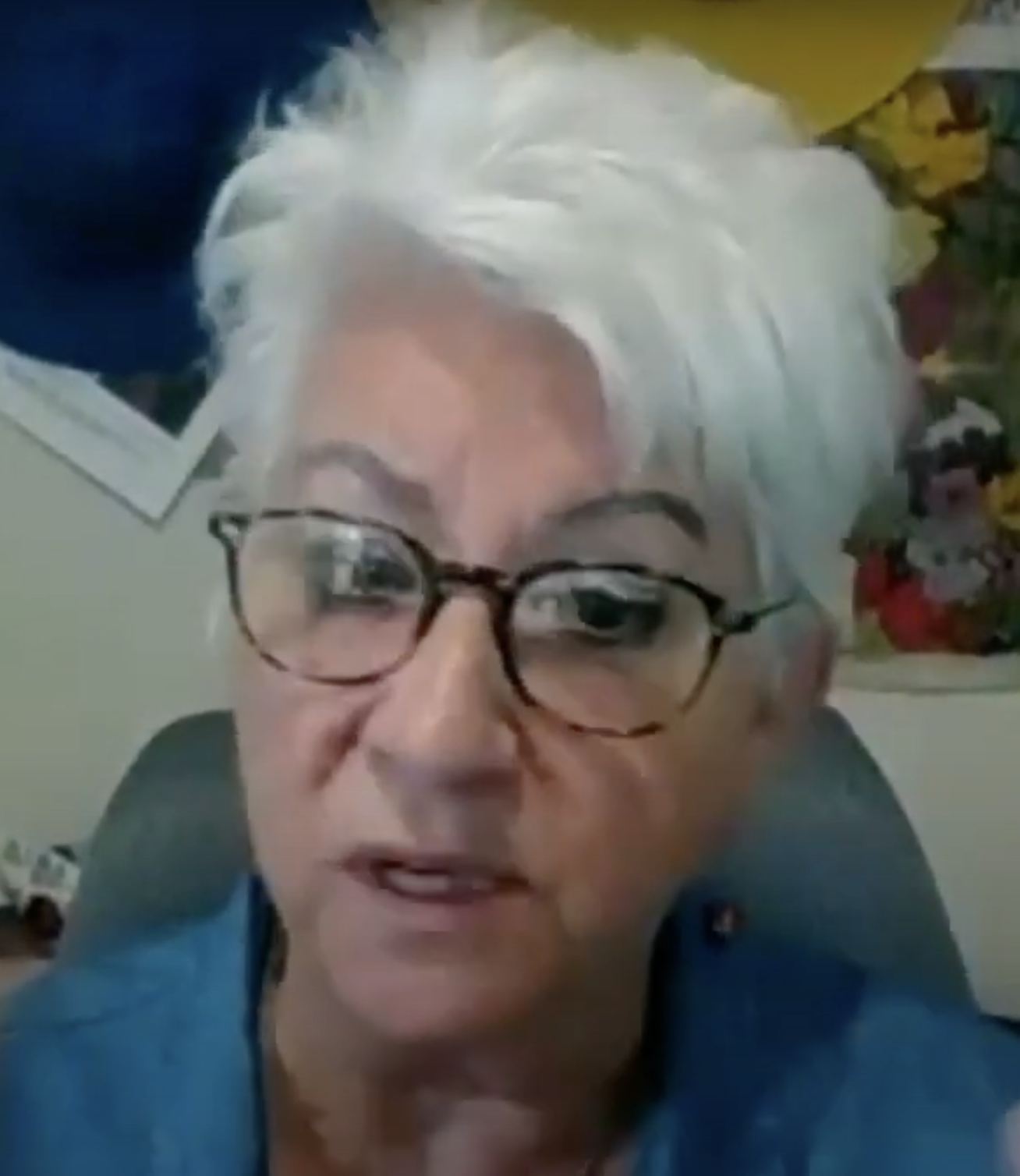

Candidate	Lee Leffingwell	Brigid Shea	Clay Dafoe
Popular vote	25,446	18,126	5,310
Percentage	52.06%	37.08%	10.86%
Mayor before election
Lee Leffingwell
Elected mayor
Lee Leffingwell

The 2012 Austin mayoral election was held on May 12, 2012, to elect the mayor of Austin, Texas. It saw the reelection of incumbent mayor Lee Leffingwell.

Due to a shift in the following 2014 election from mayoral elections from being held every three years to being held every four years in United States midterm election years, this was an election to an abbreviated term.

== Debate ==
2012 Austin mayoral debate
No.	Date	Host	Moderator	Link	Nonpartisan	Nonpartisan	Nonpartisan
Key: P Participant A Absent N Not invited I Invited W Withdrawn							
Key: P Participant A Absent N Not invited I Invited W Withdrawn					Clay Dafoe	Lee Leffingwell	Brigid Shea
1	Apr. 16, 2012	KXAN	Robert Hadlock	YouTube (Part 1); YouTube (Part 2); YouTube (Part 3); YouTube (Part 4); YouTube (Part 5); YouTube (Part 6)	P	P	P

== Election results ==
2012 Austin mayoral election
Party	Candidate	Votes	%
Nonpartisan	Lee Leffingwell (incumbent)	25,446	52.06
Nonpartisan	Brigid Shea	18,126	37.08
Nonpartisan	Clay Dafoe	5,310	10.86
Turnout		48,882	
