= Lee Leffingwell =

American environmentalist and politician

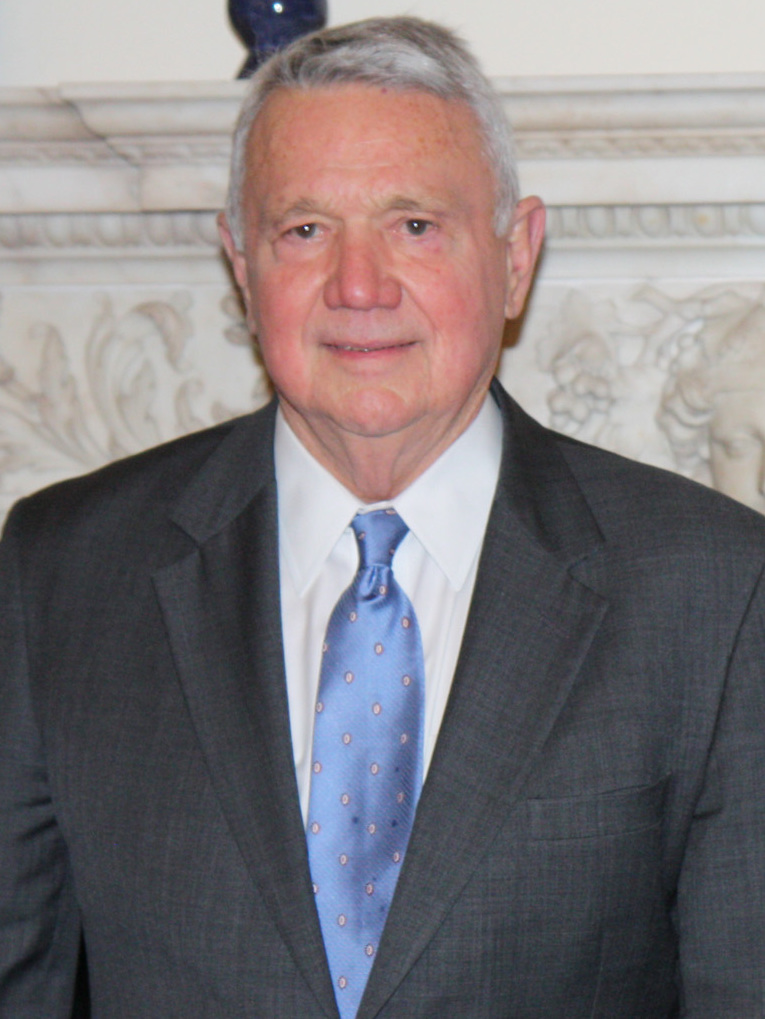

57th Mayor of Austin
- In office June 22, 2009 – January 6, 2015
- Preceded by: Will Wynn
- Succeeded by: Steve Adler

Personal details
- Born: October 13, 1939 (age 86) Austin, Texas, U.S.
- Party: Democratic
- Spouse: Julie Byers
- Children: 2
- Education: University of Texas at Austin (BS)
- Occupation: Aircraft pilot; politician; environmentalist

Military service
- Allegiance: United States
- Branch/service: United States Navy
- Years of service: 1961-1966
- Battles/wars: Vietnam War

Shelly "Lee" Leffingwell (born October 13, 1939) is an American environmentalist and politician who served as the 57th mayor of Austin from 2009 to 2015. A member of the Democratic Party, Leffingwell previously served as chair of Austin's Environmental Board.

He was first elected to the Austin City Council in 2005, and won re-election in 2008. He was elected mayor in 2009, and re-elected to a second three-year term on May 12, 2012, with over 52% of the vote.

== Early life and education ==
Leffingwell is a native of Austin, and grew up in the Bouldin neighborhood of South Austin. He graduated from the University of Texas at Austin with a degree in mechanical engineering. His father was an Austin firefighter and later a Travis County Deputy Sheriff and his mother worked as an admissions clerk at UT.

Prior to serving as an elected official, Leffingwell was officer and pilot in the United States Navy and commercial airline pilot. After spending five years on active duty, including Vietnam service, Leffingwell joined the Navy Reserves, completing a total of 20 years military service. He was a pilot for Delta Air Lines for almost 32 years, ending his airline career as an international Boeing 767 and MD-11 Captain.

== Career ==
After retiring from Delta, Lee volunteered in Austin, working on environmental issues. He was appointed to the Environmental Board by the Austin City Council in 1999, and subsequently elected Chair by his colleagues. In 2005, he ran for city council, suffering through the death of his wife just two weeks before election day. In 2008 he won re-election for the Place 1 seat.

Leffingwell became mayor of Austin in the 2009 election when his opponent Brewster McCracken, a distant second place contender in the initial round, voluntarily dropped out of the run-off election. He ran on a platform of increased public transparency, investment in transportation infrastructure, and support of small business. Throughout his career, Leffingwell has paid particular interest to environmental concerns, including water conservation, banning plastic grocery bags and supporting Austin environmental symbol Barton Springs.

He was reelected mayor in 2012. Leffingwell endorsed Steve Adler for Austin Mayor during the 2014 Mayoral election even though colleagues Mike Martinez and Sheryl Cole were running.

Political offices
Preceded by Will Wynn	Mayor of Austin; 2009–2015	Succeeded by Steve Adler
