= Chad Prather =

American internet personality (born 1972)

- Prather in 2025
- Born: Chad Prather; December 9, 1972 (age 53)
- Education: Columbia International University (BA, MA)
- Occupations: Comedian, talk show host
- Years active: 2000–present
- Political party: Republican
- Spouse: Jadrien Berry (m. 2012; div. 2021)
- Children: 4
- Website: www.watchchad.com

Chad Prather (born December 9, 1972) is an American conservative political commentator, comedian and Internet personality known for a series of YouTube videos in which he comments on life, right wing politics and current events. His video "Unapologetically Southern" went viral in 2015. He formerly hosted The Chad Prather Show for 5 years on BlazeTV. Prather ran for Governor of Texas against incumbent Greg Abbott in the 2022 Republican gubernatorial primary, but was eliminated in the primary on March 1, 2022.

== Early life and education ==
Prather grew up in Augusta, Georgia, where he attended Westside High School. Prather graduated from high school in 1991 and then attended the University of Georgia. He earned a bachelor's degree in communications and a master's degree from Columbia International University.

== Career ==
In 2013, Prather was approached by fledgling television network Ride TV about potentially hosting a humor, travel show called "It's My Backyard". While working on the show Prather began to use social media outlets to promote the program. He is best known for his viral YouTube video "Unapologetically Southern," which was featured on Fox News and in Country Living. Prather has also appeared in other media outlets including Fox and Friends, MSN, CNN and Nash Country Weekly. Prather has been referred to as an armchair philosopher. He often wears a cowboy hat and speaks to the camera from the cab of his truck.

In 2016, Chad Prather and Fort Worth, Texas comedian Cowboy Bill Martin teamed up to begin the Kings of Cowtown World Comedy Tour. In 2017, working with Steve McGrew, Prather released the satirical song "I've Got Friends in Safe Spaces", based on Garth Brooks' hit "Friends in Low Places", about progressive college students immuring themselves in safe spaces.

Prather formerly hosted The Chad Prather Show for 5 years on BlazeTV until taking the show independent in 2024.

== Political career ==
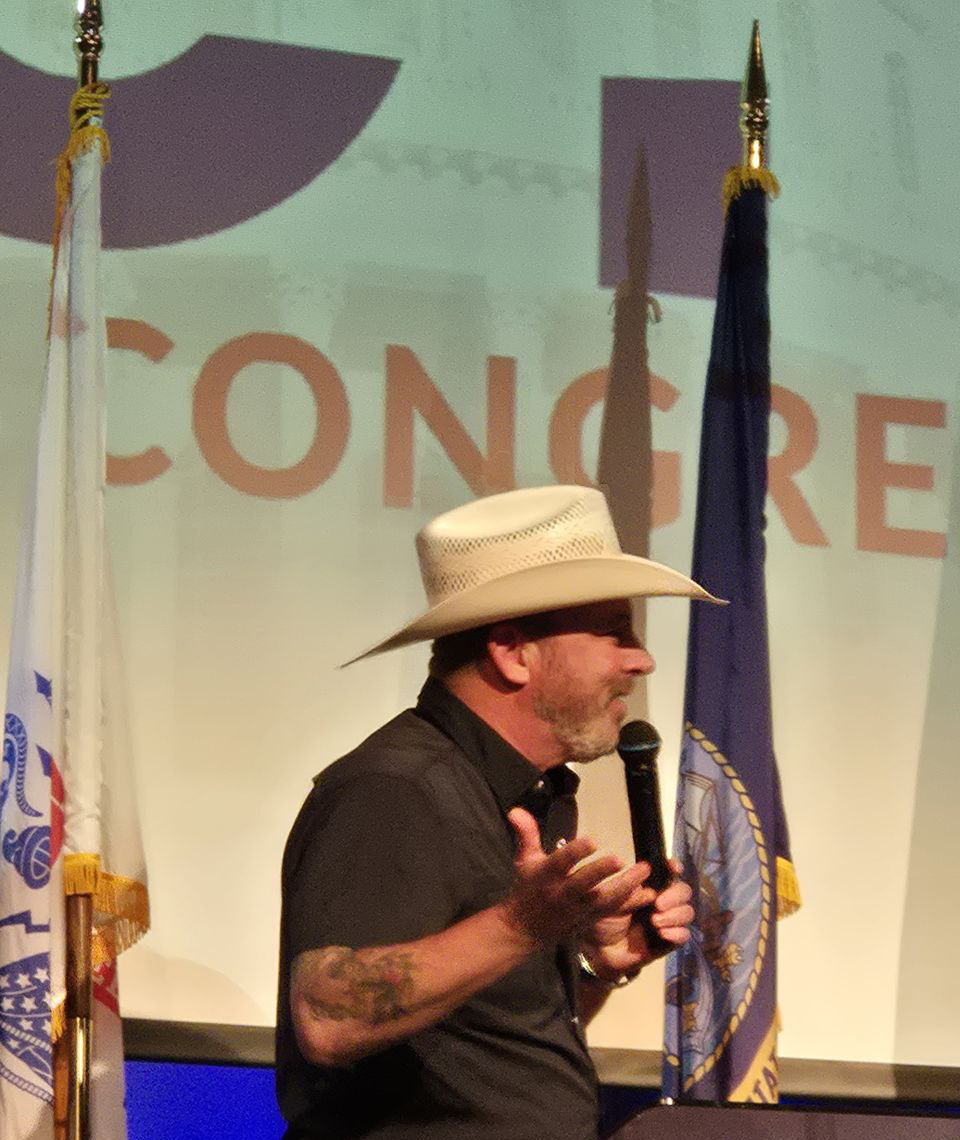
Chad Prather speaking at a political rally in Spring, Texas on July 15, 2025

In 2020, Prather announced his candidacy for the 2022 Texas gubernatorial election in reaction to incumbent governor Greg Abbott's policy of mandating face coverings throughout his state amid the COVID-19 pandemic in Texas. Prather included "pro-life", "pro-gun", and promised to "defend First Amendment speech rights against those in academia, big tech media organizations and politics who seek to silence conservatives" on his weekly podcast on Blaze Radio Network. Prather has stated that he believes the issue of Texas secession from the United States should be put on the ballot for voters to decide. Chad Prather ran for governor of Texas in the Republican primary but lost to the incumbent governor Greg Abbott.
