= Confessor =

Title used within Christianity

In a number of Christian traditions, including Eastern Orthodoxy, Catholicism, Lutheranism and Anglicanism, a confessor is a priest who hears the confessions of penitents and pronounces absolution.

== History ==
During the Diocletianic Persecution, a number of Christians had, under torture or threat thereof, weakened in their profession of the faith. When persecutions ceased under Constantine the Great, they wanted to be reunited with the church. It became the practice of the penitents to go to the Confessors, who had willingly suffered for the faith and survived, to plead their case and effect their restoration to communion.

Over time, the word came to denote any priest who had been granted the authority to hear confessions. Historically, priests were sometimes tested by officers of the church called examiners, before being granted this authority.

== As spiritual advisor ==
An individual may have a regular confessor, sometimes called a "spiritual advisor" or "spiritual father", to whom they turn for confidential and disinterested advice, especially on spiritual matters. Historically, this has been a common practice for Christian monarchs.

It is standard practice for a religious community of women, whether enclosed or just very large, to have one or several priests serving their spiritual needs, including being their confessor.

== See also ==
- Confession (religion)
- Elder (Christianity)
- Priesthood (Catholic Church)
- Starets
