= Sheryl Cole =

Texas politician (born 1964)

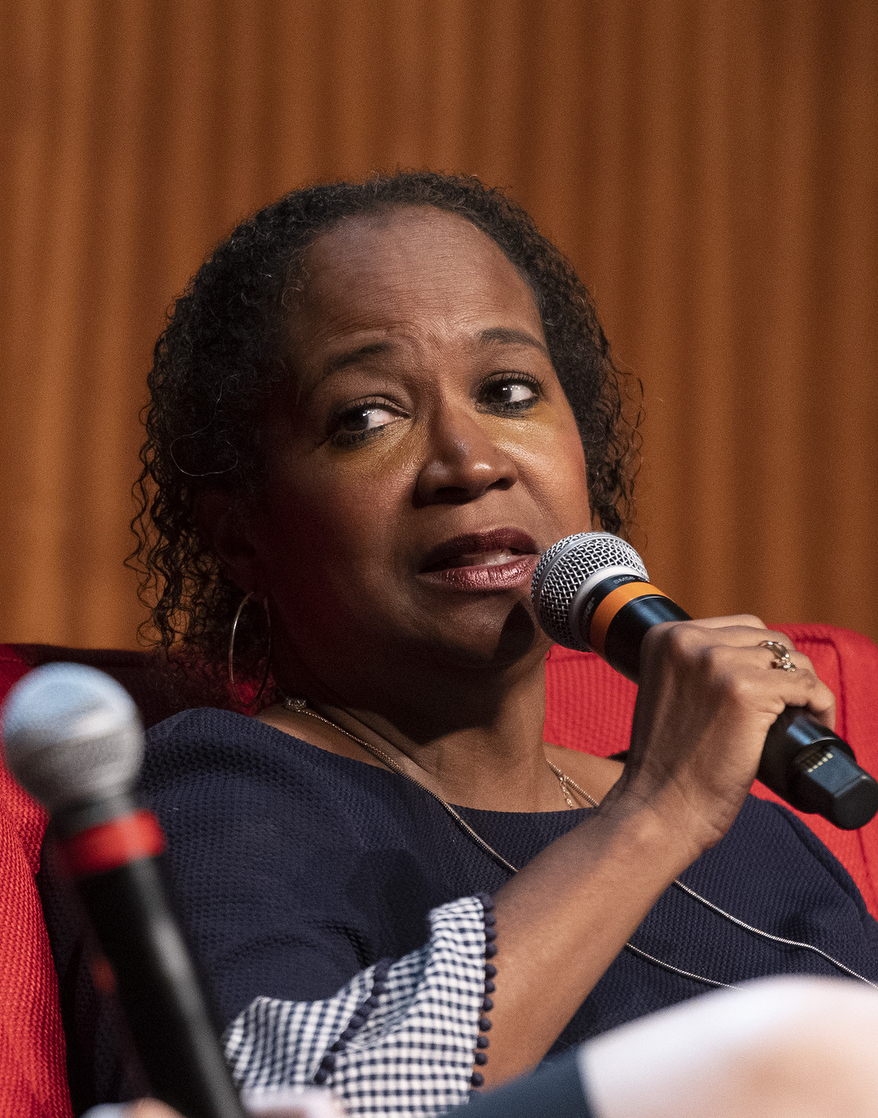
- Cole in 2022

Member of the Texas House of Representatives from the 46th district
- Incumbent
- Assumed office January 8, 2019
- Preceded by: Dawnna Dukes

At-Large Member of the Austin City Council, Place 6
- In office 2006–2015
- Preceded by: Danny Thomas
- Succeeded by: Constituency Abolished

Personal details
- Born: August 16, 1964 (age 62)
- Party: Democratic
- Education: University of Texas, Austin (BA, JD)

Sheryl Nelson Cole (born August 16, 1964) is a Democratic member of the Texas House of Representatives for House District 46, which is located within Travis County, Texas.

== Education ==
Cole earned her Bachelor of Arts in accounting from University of Texas in Austin and her Juris Doctor from the University of Texas School of Law.

== Politics ==
Cole served three terms on the Austin City Council from 2006 to 2015. She was Mayor Pro Tempore of Austin and a candidate in the 2014 Austin mayoral election.

=== Texas House of Representatives ===
On May 22, 2018, Cole won the Democratic primary runoff election for Texas House District 46 with 51% of the vote to her opponent's 49%. On November 6, 2018, she won the general election with 82% of the vote to her opponent's 18%.

== Election History ==
2018 Texas House of Representatives District 46 Democratic primary runoff
Party	Candidate	Votes	%
Democratic	Sheryl Cole	4,967	50.9
Democratic	Jose Vela	4,794	49.1
Total votes		9,761	100

2018 Texas House of Representatives District 46 Democratic primary
Party	Candidate	Votes	%
Democratic	Jose Vela	6,209	39.6
Democratic	Sheryl Cole	6,000	38.2
Democratic	Dawnna Dukes (incumbent)	1,595	10.2
Democratic	Ana Cortez	1,275	8.1
Democratic	Casey McKinney	312	2
Democratic	Warren Baker	300	1.9
Total votes		15,691	100

2014 Austin mayoral election
Candidate	Votes	%
Steve Adler	64,416	36.77
Mike Martinez	51,892	29.62
Sheryl Cole	25,846	14.76
Todd Phelps	17,333	9.90
Mary Catherine Krenek	7,370	4.21
David Orshalick	3,746	2.14
Randall Stephens	3,204	1.83
Ronald Culver	1,358	0.78
Turnout	209,140	%

May 12th, 2012 Austin City Council Place 6 election
Candidate	Votes	%
Sheryl Cole (incumbent)	32,395	70.86
Shaun Ireland	13,323	29.14
Turnout	45,718	100%

May 9th, 2009 Austin City Council Place 6 election
Candidate	Votes	%
Sheryl Cole (incumbent)	42,631	83.16
Sam Osemene	8,632	16.84
Turnout	51,263	100%

May 13th, 2006 Austin City Council Place 6 election
Candidate	Votes	%
Sheryl Cole	27,205	59.77
Darrell Pierce	14,377	31.59
DeWayne W. Lofton	3,932	8.64
Turnout	45,514	100%
