= Examiner (Roman Catholicism) =

Officer of the Roman Catholic church

Examiners were officers of the Roman Catholic church who conducted examinations relating to church positions. Synodal examiners were licensed by Catholic dioceses, while Apostolic examiners were licensed by the Pope directly. Both types of examiners conducted examinations for junior clergy, confessors, and prospective members of religious orders.
