= Steve Adler (politician) =

Mayor of Austin, Texas, United States

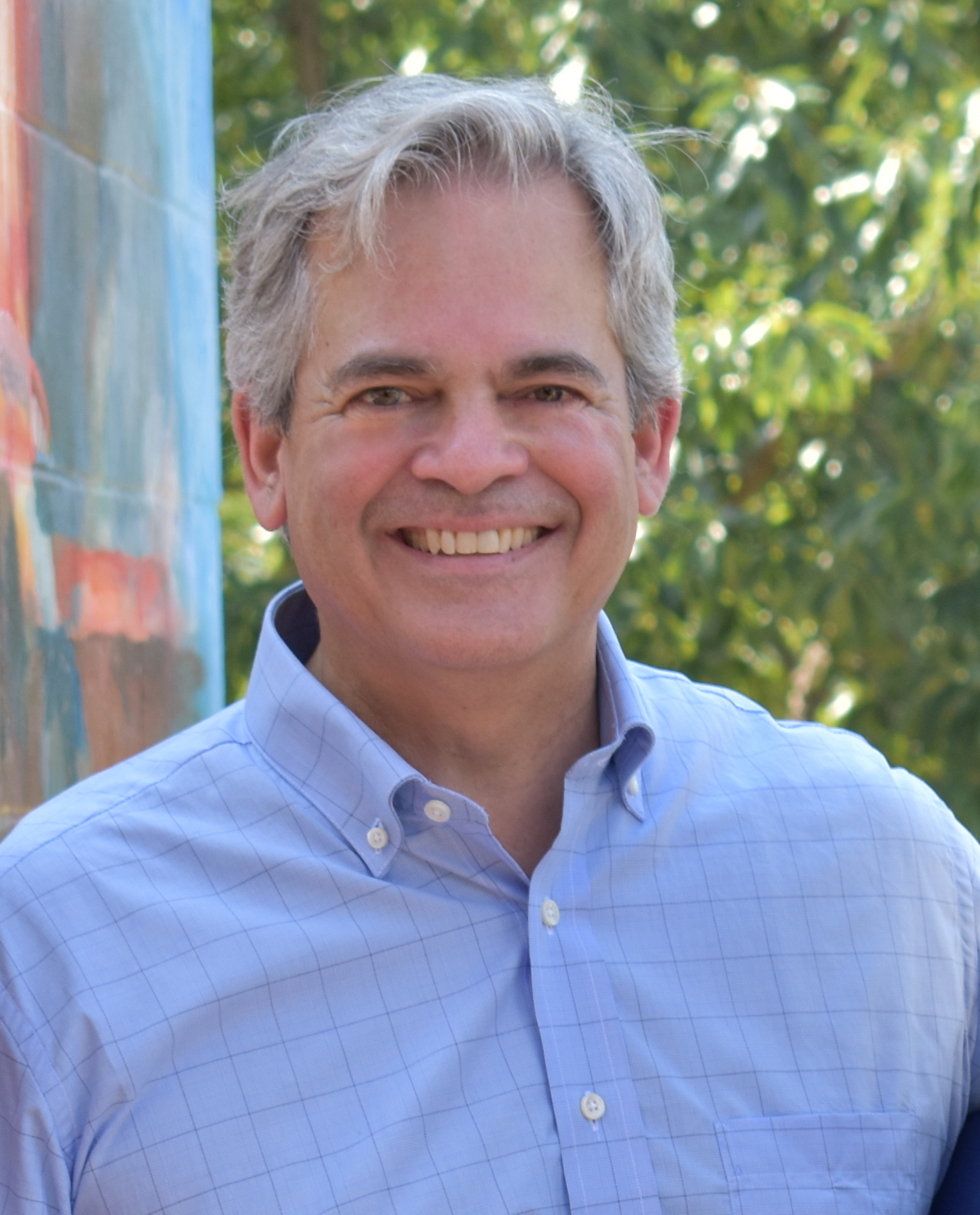
- Adler in 2019

58th Mayor of Austin
- In office January 6, 2015 – January 6, 2023
- Preceded by: Lee Leffingwell
- Succeeded by: Kirk Watson

Personal details
- Born: Stephen Ira Adler; March 23, 1956 (age 70) Washington, D.C., U.S.
- Party: Democratic
- Spouse: Diane Land
- Education: Princeton University (BA); University of Texas at Austin (JD)
- Website: Official website

Stephen Ira Adler (born March 23, 1956) is an American lawyer and politician who served as the 58th mayor of Austin from 2015 to 2023.

Adler has been a practicing attorney in Austin in the areas of eminent domain and civil rights law for 35 years. For eight years he worked as the chief of staff and later general counsel to Democratic State Senator Eliot Shapleigh in the Texas Legislature. He has also worked with or board chaired Austin-based nonprofits and civic organizations, including the Texas Tribune, Anti-Defamation League, and Ballet Austin.

A Democrat, Adler was elected to be mayor of Austin in the 2014 mayoral race and was sworn in on January 6, 2015; he was re-elected in 2018. He was the first mayor of Austin to serve under the 10-ONE council system. During Adler's tenure he lifted a ban on camping, sitting, or lying down in public causing Texas governor Greg Abbott to threaten the deployment of state resources to combat the move. In response to the COVID-19 pandemic, Adler declared a local state of emergency and cancelled Austin's annual SXSW events in 2020. He came under controversy for flying in his private plane to Cabo San Lucas while urging people in Austin to stay home amid rising cases of COVID-19.

== Early life and education ==
Steve Adler was born to a Jewish family and first lived in Washington, D.C. and grew up in Kensington, Maryland. His father was a World War II veteran with the U.S. Navy who later became a film editor with CBS News. His mother was a homemaker.

In 1978, he graduated from Princeton University with a B.A. from the Woodrow Wilson School of Public and International Affairs. He then attended the University of Texas at Austin School of Law and received his juris doctor in 1982. After graduating from the University of Texas, Adler remained in Austin to practice law.

== Legal career ==
In the mid-1980s, Steve Adler co-founded the Barron, Graham & Adler LLP law firm, later Barron & Adler, LLP. He represented primarily landowners who were dealing with eminent domain and condemnation cases where the government or a private company seek to acquire their property. In addition to this practice, Adler spent most of the 1980s, his early legal career, doing civil rights employment discrimination cases. This work included representing women as well as Hispanic, African American and other minority workers in federal court, before the Equal Employment and Opportunity Commission and on matters filed with the Austin Human Rights Commission. He represented clients seeking equal treatment and opportunity in the workplace, redress from sexual harassment and denial of equal pay for equal work.

Adler has argued before state appellate courts, the United States Court of Appeals for the Fifth Circuit, and the Texas Supreme Court and was named a Texas Super Lawyer from 2007 to 2013 and one of the Best Lawyers in America in 2007–2014.

== Early political career ==
In 1996, Steve Adler assisted El Paso Democrat Eliot Shapleigh in his run for Texas State Senate. He then served as Senator Shapleigh's chief of staff and later general counsel from 1997 to 2005.

During Adler's time working in the Texas Senate, he primarily focused on fairness in school funding formulas, teachers' salary issues, state budget policy, environmental protection, and equity and access issues.

== Mayor of Austin (2015–2023) ==
=== Elections ===
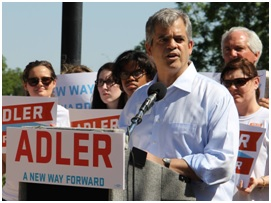
Adler at his 2014 campaign launch

Steve Adler began his campaign in January 2014 for Austin Mayor and ran on a platform of reforming governance at the Austin City Council. His primary issues included governance, traffic congestion, education, affordability, environment and water, and neighborhoods. Adler entered into a run-off with City Council Member Mike Martinez in November after both candidates failed to get a majority of votes. Adler won the run-off on December 16, 2014, with 67% percent of the total vote.

Adler won reelection in 2018, garnering 59% of the vote in a 7-way race. He was ineligible to run for reelection in 2022 due to term limits.

=== Tenure ===
Adler is affiliated with the Democratic Party.

Adler was the first mayor to serve as part of the "10–1" City Council system that was approved via referendum by voters during the 2012 election and implemented after the 2014 election. Previously, the Austin City Council was composed of six at-large Council members and a mayor. The new system is composed of a mayor and ten Council members representing geographic districts, prompted by Austin's dramatic population growth as well as a recognition that the former system often resulted in an underrepresentation of Austin's minority communities, particularly its rapidly growing Latino population. For years, the city's political establishment had abided by an unwritten "gentleman's agreement" that reserved one Council seat for a Latino and one for an African American.

In May 2017, when the Alamo Drafthouse Cinema in Austin announced that it would hold a women-only screening of the movie Wonder Woman, one man wrote Mayor Adler an angry email about allowing the event to take place, in which he urged the boycott of Austin and called women "the second rate gender". Adler's response, in which he facetiously warned the writer that his email account had been "hacked by ... an unusually hostile individual", and listed women's accomplishments, drew national attention.

On April 14, 2019, Adler gave the introductory speech at Pete Buttigieg's announcement of his candidacy for president.

In 2022, Adler advocated for a $1 million pilot program to provide monthly checks of $1,000 to 85 low-income families in order to examine the effects of guaranteed income.

=== Race relations ===
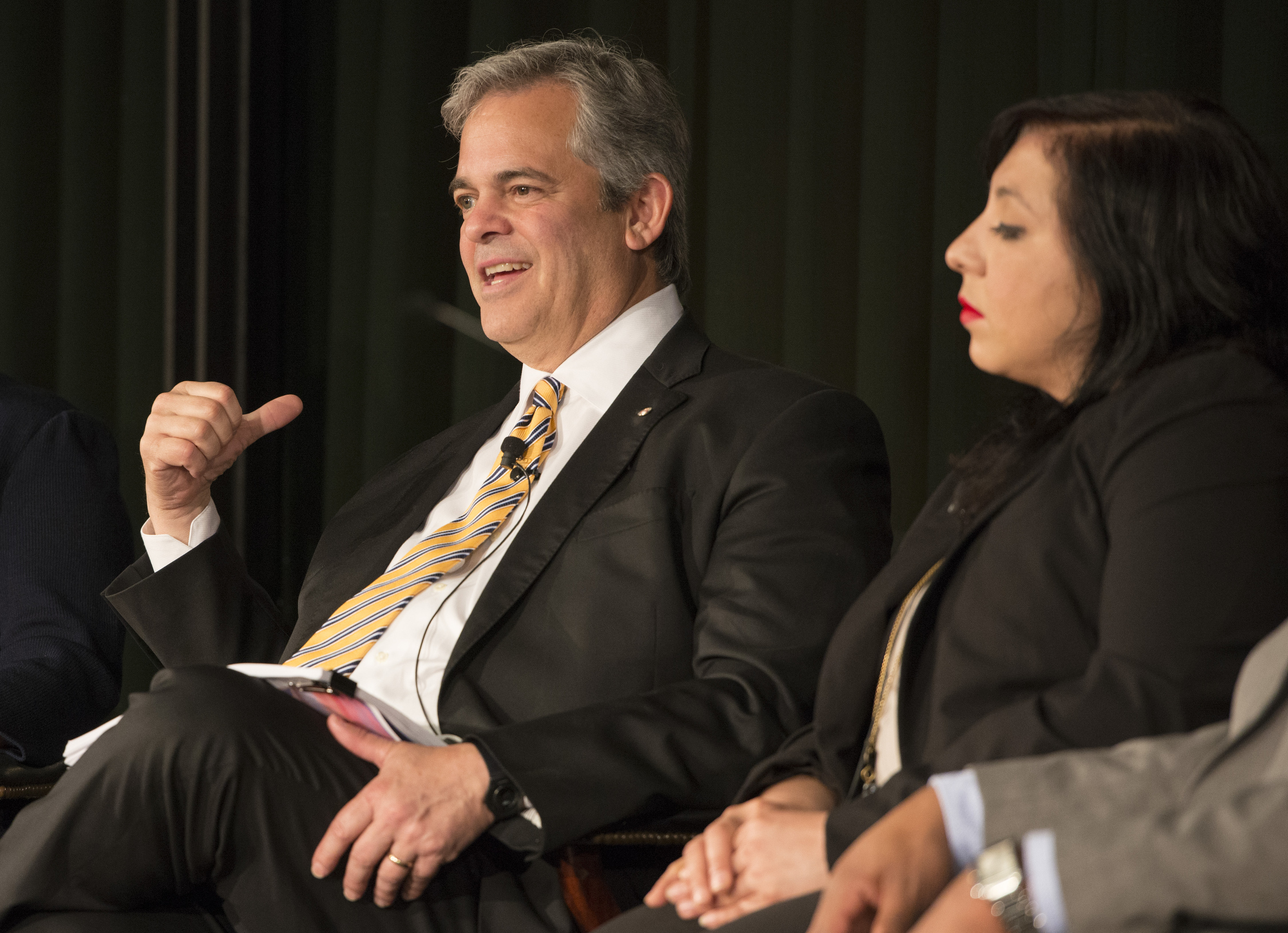
Adler speaking at the LBJ Library's Future forum regarding the Austin Mayor's Task Force Report on Institutional Racism and Systemic Inequities, 2017.

In March 2015, Adler denounced an anonymous group's attempt to inflame discussion of gentrification in historically black neighborhoods of East Austin by placing stickers on the doors of East Side businesses that proclaimed them off-limits to non-whites. "This is an appalling and offensive display of ignorance in our city," said Adler. "Our city is a place where respect for all people is a part of our spirit and soul. We will keep it that way."

Adler has been a proponent of the Equity Office . Following a six-month search, Brion Oaks was selected September 2016 as the city's first Chief Equity Officer.

In 2017, Adler hosted a Future forum at the Lyndon Baines Johnson Library and Museum regarding his Task Force Report on Institutional Racism and Systemic Inequities.

In June 2021, Adler was one of 11 U.S. mayors to form Mayors Organized for Reparations and Equity (MORE), a coalition of municipal leaders dedicated to starting pilot reparations programs in their cities.

=== Homelessness ===
In 2016, Adler and the United States Department of Housing and Urban Development declared that significant progress had been made to house homeless veterans. Despite progress in the area of veterans, work remains to be done to further reduce homelessness and associated drug use. During the summer of 2016, several people were hospitalized during an outbreak of K2 overdoses around the Austin Resource Center for the Homeless.

In June 2019, following a federal court ruling on homeless people sleeping in public, Adler and the City Council lifted a 25-year-old ban on camping, sitting, or lying down in public unless doing so causes an obstruction. The resolution also included the approval of a new housing-focused shelter in South Austin. On October 2, 2019, Texas Governor Greg Abbott sent a letter to Adler threatening to deploy state resources to combat the camping ban repeal. Adler responded by denying that the rule changes increased crime, but invited Abbott to join groups related to combatting homelessness. On October 26, 2019, Adler and Governor Abbott clashed over Twitter after Abbott posted a video of a man vandalizing a car in Downtown Austin, in an effort to criticize the City Council's camping ordinance. Adler responded by pointing out that the video was filmed in 2018 before the ordinance took effect and that the man in question was not homeless, saying "This isn't the first time you've fallen victim to social media trolls trying to mislead and scare Austinites." Under Adler's tenure, in 2020 the homeless population in Austin reached a 10-year high as counted by the Ending Community Homelessness Coalition. Austin citizens successfully petitioned for a referendum on the issue."On May 1, 2021, Austin voters approved Proposition B, making it a criminal offense (Class C misdemeanor punishable by a fine) for anyone to sit, lie down, or camp in public areas and prohibiting solicitation of money or other things of value at specific hours and locations."

=== COVID-19 pandemic and SXSW cancellation ===
On March 6, 2020, Adler declared a local state of emergency as a result of the COVID-19 pandemic. Adler, along with other city officials, also responded to the outbreak by cancelling Austin's annual SXSW events for the first time since they started in 1987 due to the ongoing health concerns.

In November 2020, Adler flew to Cabo San Lucas on a private plane with eight or more family members and friends, all from multiple different households, and attended the wedding of his daughter in an inside venue with 20+ individuals. Controversy ensued as Adler has encouraged people to stay home amid rising caseloads in Austin. Adler has stated that while he regrets making the trip, he "violated no orders or guidelines."

=== Cybersecurity and Infrastructure Security Agency ===
In December 2021, Adler was appointed to the White House’s Cybersecurity and Infrastructure Security Agency (CISA)'s Advisory Committee by then director Jen Easterly.

=== Work with community organizations ===
Adler has been involved in a number of community organizations in the Greater Austin region. Adler has served on the Ballet Austin board since the late 1990s. From 2009 to 2012, Adler served as the board chair of the Anti-Defamation League Austin Region where he contributed to the creation of the Austin Hate Crimes Task Force and expanding the "No Place for Hate" anti-bullying program to schools throughout Central Texas. In 2010, he joined the board of Girls Empowerment Network (formerly GENAustin)

Adler was on the founding board of directors for the Texas Tribune in 2009. He was later appointed board chair, a role he resigned from in January 2014 in order to launch his run for Austin mayor.

== Media appearances ==
On May 25, 2021, Adler appeared as a guest on episode 1657 of The Joe Rogan Experience.

== See also ==
- List of mayors of the 50 largest cities in the United States

Political offices
Preceded by Lee Leffingwell	Mayor of Austin; 2015–2023	Succeeded by Kirk Watson
