= National Coalition Building Institute =

The National Coalition Building Institute (NCBI) is a nonprofit leadership training organization based in Washington, D.C., United States. It was founded by Cherie Brown in 1984. Recognized by the U.S. Department of Education as a national "best practice,” it excels at transforming workplaces and campuses into equity-centered, highly collaborative environments.

== Foundation and approach ==
NCBI trains community leaders in skills designed to reduce intergroup conflicts. NCBI believes that no type of oppression (racism, classism, sexism, etc.) takes priority over another. NCBI’s work focuses on sharing personal stories of discrimination and mistreatment without shaming or blaming the perpetrators, and on building allies in other groups, so that members of who they regard as oppressed groups are not isolated.

== Chapters and affiliates ==
Currently NCBI has 50 city-based leadership teams, known as NCBI Chapters; 30 organization-based leadership teams, known as NCBI Affiliates; and 61 college/university-based teams, known as Campus Affiliates. Most NCBI chapters include participants from public and private schools, local businesses, law enforcement agencies, religious institutions, community organizations, trade unions, and government offices. The local leadership includes elected officials, law enforcement officers, government workers, educators, students, business executives, labor union leaders, community activists, and religious leaders. These community leaders work together as a resource team to deal with prejudice and intergroup tensions.

NCBI teams meet regularly and lead prejudice reduction programs for organizations in their communities, and they intervene with conflict resolution skills when intergroup conflicts arise. They may also offer programs that aim to help organizations to build inclusive environments.

NCBI has conducted diversity programs on college campuses. There are active Campus Affiliates at 65 colleges and universities in the United States and Canada. An NCBI Campus Affiliate consists of a representative cross-section of students, faculty, and administrators, trained by NCBI, in order to provide a proactive response to what they believe to be discrimination and inter-group conflict on campus. The NCBI-trained team offers year-long leadership workshops that aim to create a more inclusive campus environment. Participants in the team-led workshops acquire skills designed to change what NCBI regards as prejudicial attitudes and learn how to become more effective allies for one another.

A college or university becomes an NCBI Campus Affiliate by paying a lead trainer from NCBI headquarters to lead a three-day Train-the-Trainer Seminar. In this training, campus participants learn how to lead the eight-hour Prejudice Reduction Workshop and the NCBI Controversial Issue Process. Following the Train-the-Trainer Seminar, NCBI, in consultation with the sponsoring institution, selects a Campus Affiliate Director. The Affiliate Director leads the campus team and serves as the liaison with the NCBI National Office. The NCBI Campus Program Director, an experienced campus consultant, offers monthly telephone support and supervision to the Affiliate Director. Members of the campus team also receive ongoing training and support through monthly campus meetings as well as through NCBI's Annual National Campus Conference, where Campus Affiliates share resources and information on best practices.

Chapters contribute 10% of income generated from fee-for-service work back to NCBI headquarters. No chapters have paid full-time staff and are generally run by a combination of volunteers and paid consultants who conduct trainings and related programs in their local community.

== Reception ==
After an independent evaluation of dozens of college diversity programs, the U.S. Department of Education recognized NCBI's campus work as a "promising practice," a designation given to few programs in the United States.
