= The Examiner (Beaumont) =

Investigative newspaper in Texas, USA

The Examiner is an investigative weekly newspaper based in Beaumont, Texas published by the Examiner Corporation. It calls itself "The Independent Voice of Southeast Texas". The paper was founded in 1996 and its staff has been awarded a variety of local, state and national awards.
