= List of Mexican Americans =

Mexican Americans are residents of the United States who are of Mexican descent. The list includes Mexican immigrants and those who lived in the southwestern United States when the territory was incorporated in 1848.

== Sports ==
=== American football ===
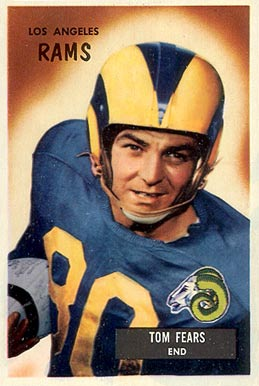
Tom Fears

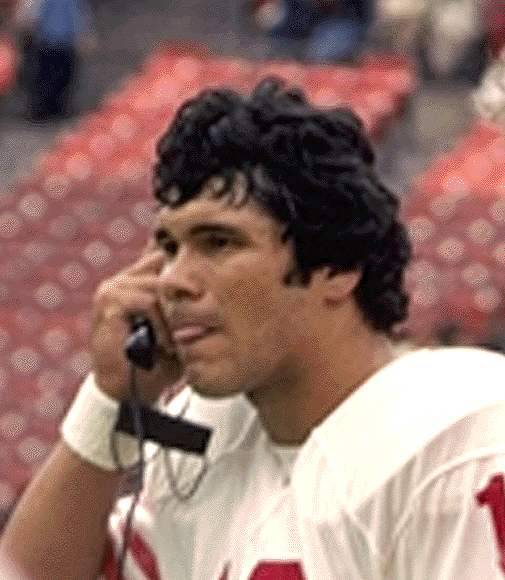
Two-time Super Bowl-winning quarterback Jim Plunkett

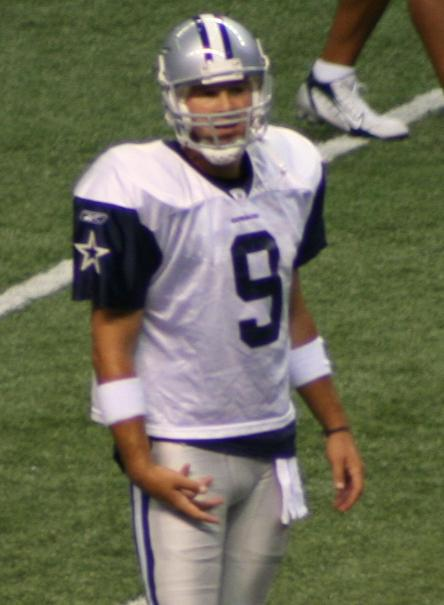
Tony Romo

- Louie Aguiar – NFL punter
- Joe Aguirre – NFL tight end
- Roberto Aguayo – NFL and NCAA Division I placekicker at Florida State University
- Leo Araguz – NFL kicker and punter
- Joe Arenas – NFL running back, safety, punt returner and kick returner
- Gene Brito – defensive end, 1955 NFL player of the year
- Anthony Calvillo – CFL quarterback
- Greg Camarillo – NFL wide receiver
- Joe Cardona – NFL long snapper
- Tony Casillas – NFL defensive lineman
- Sergio Castillo – NFL kicker and punter
- Jorge Cordova – NFL linebacker
- Frank Corral – NFL placekicker
- Ronnie Cruz – NFL fullback
- Josh Cuevas – NFL tight end
- Michael Davis – NFL defensive back
- Brian de la Puente – NFL center
- Donnie Edwards – NFL linebacker
- Tom Fears – NFL wide receiver and head coach, member of Pro Football Hall of Fame
- Manny Fernandez – NFL defensive tackle
- Tom Flores – one of two people in NFL history to win a Super Bowl as a player, assistant coach and head coach
- Arian Foster – NFL running back
- Aaron Garcia – college and Arena Football quarterback
- Jeff Garcia – NFL quarterback
- Max Garcia – NFL guard
- Norberto Garrido – NFL offensive lineman
- Roberto Garza – NFL offensive guard
- Zane Gonzalez – NFL placekicker
- Brock Gutierrez – NFL offensive lineman
- Joe Hernandez – NFL wide receiver
- Will Hernandez – NFL guard
- Efren Herrera – NFL placekicker
- Ziggy Hood – NFL defensive end
- David Diaz-Infante – NFL guard and center
- Matt Kalil – NFL offensive tackle
- Ryan Kalil – NFL center
- Joe Kapp – NFL quarterback
- J. P. Losman – NFL quarterback
- Blake Martinez – NFL inside linebacker
- Mike Mohamed – former NFL linebacker
- Max Montoya – NFL
- Matt Moore – NFL quarterback
- Moses Moreno – NFL quarterback
- Zeke Moreno – NFL linebacker
- Anthony Muñoz – Hall of Fame NFL offensive tackle
- Ricky Ortiz – NFL
- Luis Perez – NCAA quarterback
- Mike Perez – NFL quarterback
- Jim Plunkett – NFL quarterback
- Jose Portilla – NFL offensive tackle
- Manny Ramirez – NFL offensive lineman
- Aldo Richins – NFL wingback
- Ron Rivera – NFL linebacker and coach
- Jacob Rodriguez – NFL linebacker
- Pete Rodriguez – NFL special teams coach
- Ruben Rodriguez – NFL punter
- Tony Romo – NFL quarterback
- Juan Roque – NFL offensive tackle
- Aldrick Rosas – NFL placekicker
- Eddie Saenz – NFL running back
- Mark Sanchez – NFL quarterback
- Rigoberto Sanchez – NFL punter
- Zack Sanchez – NFL cornerback
- Andrew Sendejo – NFL strong safety
- Rafael Septién – NFL placekicker
- Daniel Sepulveda – NFL punter
- Louis Vasquez – NFL offensive lineman
- Danny Villa – NFL guard
- Danny Villanueva – NFL punter/place kicker
- Fred Warner (American football) – NFL linebacker
- Bryce Young – NFL quarterback
- Tony Zendejas – NFL placekicker

=== Baseball ===
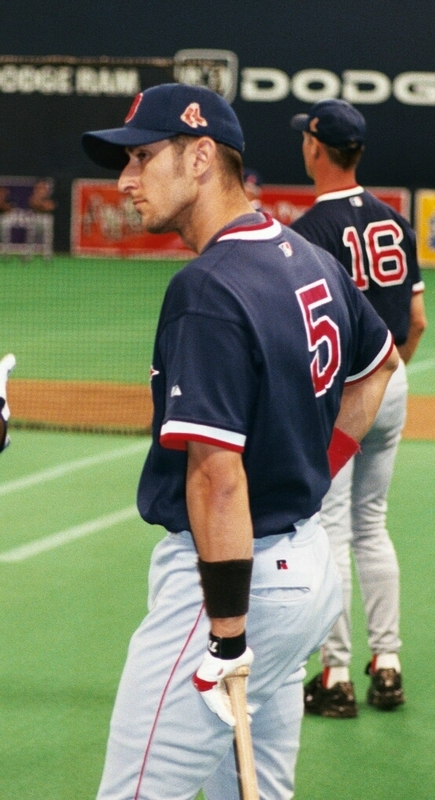
Nomar Garciaparra

- Mike Adams – MLB pitcher
- Hank Aguirre – MLB all-star pitcher
- Mike Aldrete – MLB First Baseman and Outfielder
- Mel Almada – MLB outfielder
- Armando Almanza – MLB pitcher
- Abe Alvarez – MLB pitcher
- Héctor Ambriz – MLB pitcher
- Rubén Amaro Jr. – MLB outfielder
- Bob Apodaca – MLB pitcher and coach
- Frank Arellanes – MLB pitcher
- Fernando Arroyo – MLB pitcher
- Rod Barajas – MLB catcher
- Austin Barnes – MLB catcher
- Cuno Barragan – MLB catcher
- Manny Barreda – MLB pitcher
- Freddie Benavides – MLB infielder
- Brennan Bernardino – MLB pitcher
- Quintin Berry – MLB outfielder and pinch runner
- Taj Bradley – MLB pitcher
- Matt Bush – MLB pitcher
- Jorge Cantú – MLB infielder
- Cam Carreon – MLB catcher
- Mark Carreon – MLB first baseman
- Cisco Carlos – MLB pitcher
- Jason Castro – MLB catcher
- Alex Carrillo – MLB pitcher
- Cesar Carrillo – MLB pitcher
- Bobby Castillo – MLB pitcher
- Frank Castillo – MLB starting pitcher
- Marty Castillo – MLB catcher and third baseman
- Jaime Cerda – MLB pitcher
- Eric Chavez – MLB third baseman
- Jesse Chavez – MLB pitcher
- Matt Chico – MLB pitcher
- Chad Cordero – MLB relief pitcher
- Pat Corrales – MLB catcher and coach
- Dan Cortes – MLB pitcher
- Jacob Cruz – MLB outfielder
- Bobby Cuellar – MLB pitcher and coach
- Khris Davis – MLB outfielder
- Chris Dominguez – MLB infielder
- Matt Dominguez – MLB infielder
- Jarren Duran – MLB outfielder
- Chuck Estrada – MLB pitcher
- Johnny Estrada – MLB catcher
- Marco Estrada – MLB pitcher
- Fernando Cortez – MLB infielder
- Danny Espinosa – MLB infielder
- Andre Ethier – MLB outfielder
- Phillip Evans – MLB Infielder
- Carlos Fisher – MLB pitcher
- Jesse Flores – MLB pitcher
- Randy Flores – MLB pitcher
- Ron Flores – MLB pitcher
- Brian Fuentes – MLB all-star relief pitcher
- Yovani Gallardo – MLB pitcher
- Mike Gallego – MLB outfielder and coach
- Greg Garcia – MLB infielder
- Kiko Garcia – MLB infielder
- Mike Garcia – MLB all-star pitcher
- Robert Garcia – MLB pitcher
- Nomar Garciaparra – MLB all-star shortstop
- Matt Garza – MLB pitcher
- Eddie Gamboa – MLB pitcher
- Chris Gomez – MLB infielder
- Luis Gómez – MLB infielder
- Nick Gonzales – MLB infielder
- Adrián González – MLB first baseman
- Edgar Gonzalez – MLB infielder
- Michael Gonzalez – MLB closer/pitcher
- Bob Greenwood – MLB pitcher
- Eddie Guardado – MLB all-star pitcher
- Javy Guerra – MLB closer/pitcher
- Carlos Guevara – MLB pitcher
- Jerry Hairston Jr. – MLB infielder
- Scott Hairston – MLB outfielder
- Dan Haren – MLB all-star pitcher
- Gil Heredia – MLB spot starting pitcher
- David Hernandez – MLB starting pitcher
- Jeremy Hernandez – MLB pitcher
- Daniel Herrera – MLB relief pitcher
- Rudy Jaramillo – Hitting coach
- Jason Jaramillo – MLB catcher
- Jason Jiménez – MLB
- Brandon Laird – MLB infielder
- Eddie Leon – MLB infielder
- Nick Leyva – MLB manager
- Albie Lopez – MLB pitcher
- Rafael Martin – MLB relief pitcher
- Alfonso Márquez – MLB Umpire
- Alex Mejia – MLB infielder
- Sergio Mitre – MLB pitcher
- Sid Monge – MLB all-star relief pitcher
- Carlos Muñiz – MLB relief pitcher
- Sandy Nava – MLB infielder
- Efrén Navarro – MLB first baseman
- Vidal Nuño – MLB pitcher
- Ricky Nolasco – MLB pitcher
- Edgar Olmos – MLB pitcher
- Augie Ojeda – MLB infielder
- Steve Ontiveros – MLB infielder
- Jesse Orosco – MLB all-star pitcher
- Jorge Orta – MLB all-star second baseman
- Joey Ortiz – MLB infielder
- Russ Ortiz – MLB pitcher
- Jordan Pacheco – MLB infielder/catcher
- Manny Parra – MLB pitcher
- James Pazos – MLB pitcher
- Marty Perez – shortstop and baseman
- Óliver Pérez – MLB pitcher
- Chris Prieto – MLB outfielder
- Carlos Quentin – MLB all-star outfielder
- Omar Quintanilla – MLB shortstop
- Erasmo Ramirez – MLB relief pitcher
- Horacio Ramírez – MLB pitcher
- Noe Ramirez – MLB pitcher
- Roel Ramirez – MLB pitcher
- A.J. Ramos – MLB closer pitcher
- Cesar Ramos – MLB relief pitcher
- Rudy Regalado – MLB infielder
- Rick Renteria – MLB infielder and coach
- Anthony Rendon – MLB infielder
- Anthony Reyes – MLB pitcher
- Jo-Jo Reyes – MLB pitcher
- Fernando Rodriguez – MLB pitcher
- Rich Rodriguez – MLB pitcher
- JoJo Romero – MLB pitcher
- Stefen Romero – MLB Outfielder
- Ricky Romero – MLB starting pitcher
- Sergio Romo – MLB pitcher
- Rio Ruiz – MLB infielder
- Adam Rosales – MLB infielder
- Leo Rosales – MLB relief pitcher
- Mark Salas – MLB catcher
- Jeff Salazar – MLB outfielder
- Alex Sanabia – MLB pitcher
- Aaron Sanchez – MLB pitcher
- Freddy Sanchez – MLB all-star infielder and batting champion
- Jake Sanchez – MLB pitcher
- Patrick Sandoval – MLB pitcher
- Sergio Santos – MLB relief pitcher
- Rudy Seánez – MLB pitcher
- José Silva – MLB pitcher
- Tyler Skaggs – MLB pitcher
- Frank Snyder – MLB pitcher
- Rowdy Tellez – MLB first baseman
- Alek Thomas – MLB outfielder
- Carlos Torres – MLB relief pitcher
- Mike Torrez – MLB pitcher
- Alan Trejo – MLB infielder
- Jason Vargas – MLB pitcher
- Fernando Valenzuela – MLB pitcher
- Anthony Vasquez – MLB pitcher
- Randy Velarde – MLB infielder
- Gil Velazquez – MLB infielder
- Vince Velasquez – MLB pitcher
- Alex Verdugo – MLB outfielder
- Ryan Verdugo – MLB pitcher
- Pedro Villarreal – MLB pitcher
- Fernando Viña – MLB all-star second baseman
- Victor Vodnik – MLB pitcher
- Taijuan Walker – MLB pitcher
- Ted Williams – MLB left fielder and Hall of Fame legend
- Michael Young – MLB all-star MVP, shortstop and batting champion
- Joel Zumaya – MLB pitcher

=== Basketball ===
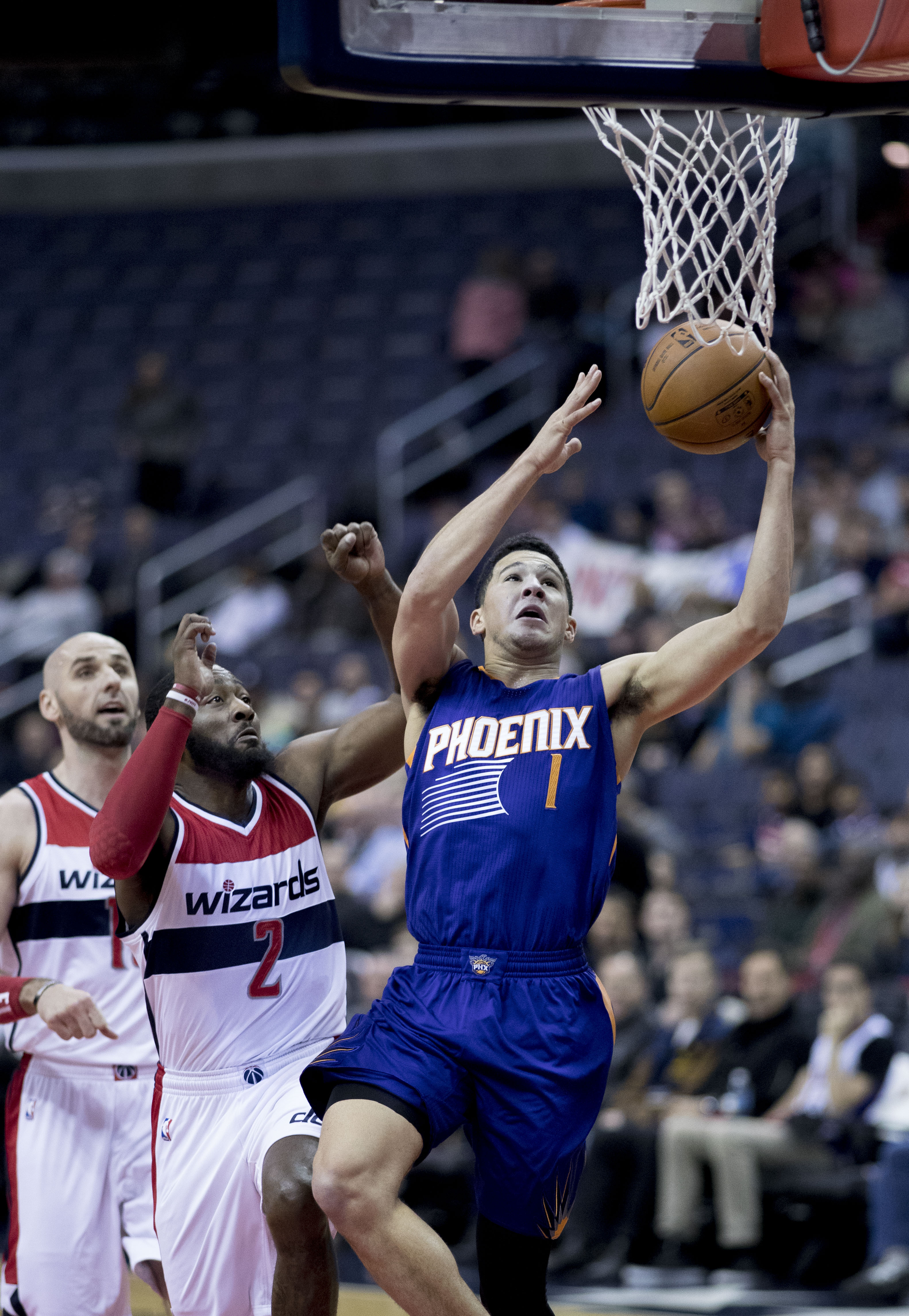
Devin Booker

- Mark Aguirre – USBWA college basketball player of the year, 3-time NBA all-star, and 2-time NBA champion
- Jack Avina – college coach
- Devin Booker – guard
- James Borrego – NBA coach
- Kaleb Canales – NBA coach
- Cedric Ceballos – forward
- Rene Herrerias – college coach
- Lorenzo Mata – center
- Elijah Millsap – forward
- Anthony Pedroza – guard
- Paul Stoll – guard
- Juan Toscano-Anderson – forward
- Orlando Méndez-Valdez – guard
- Earl Watson – guard
- Jaime Jaquez Jr. – small forward/shooting guard

=== Boxing ===
Solomon Garcia Smith became the first world champion of Latino ancestry in 1897.

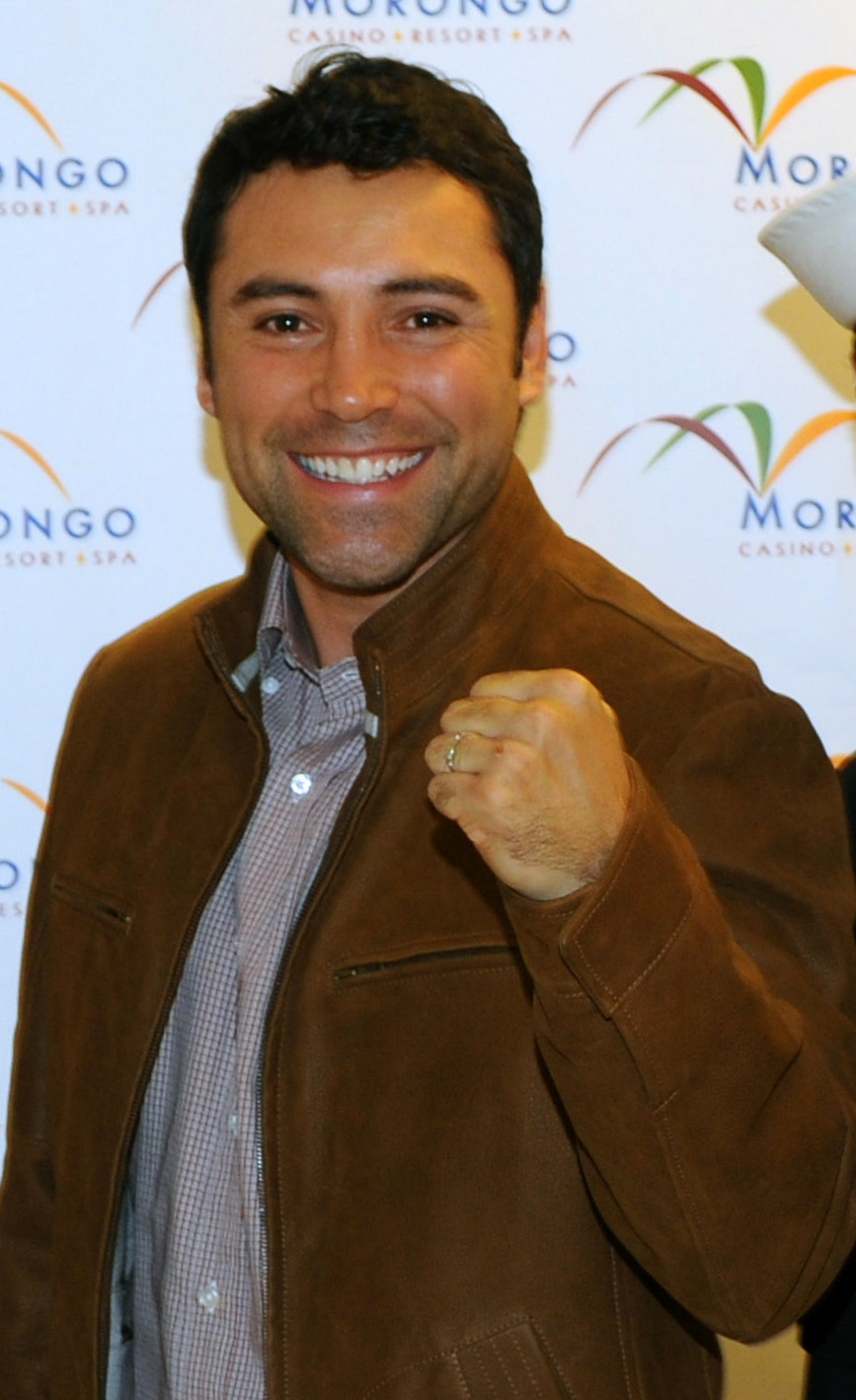
Oscar De La Hoya was the first boxer to win major titles in six divisions.

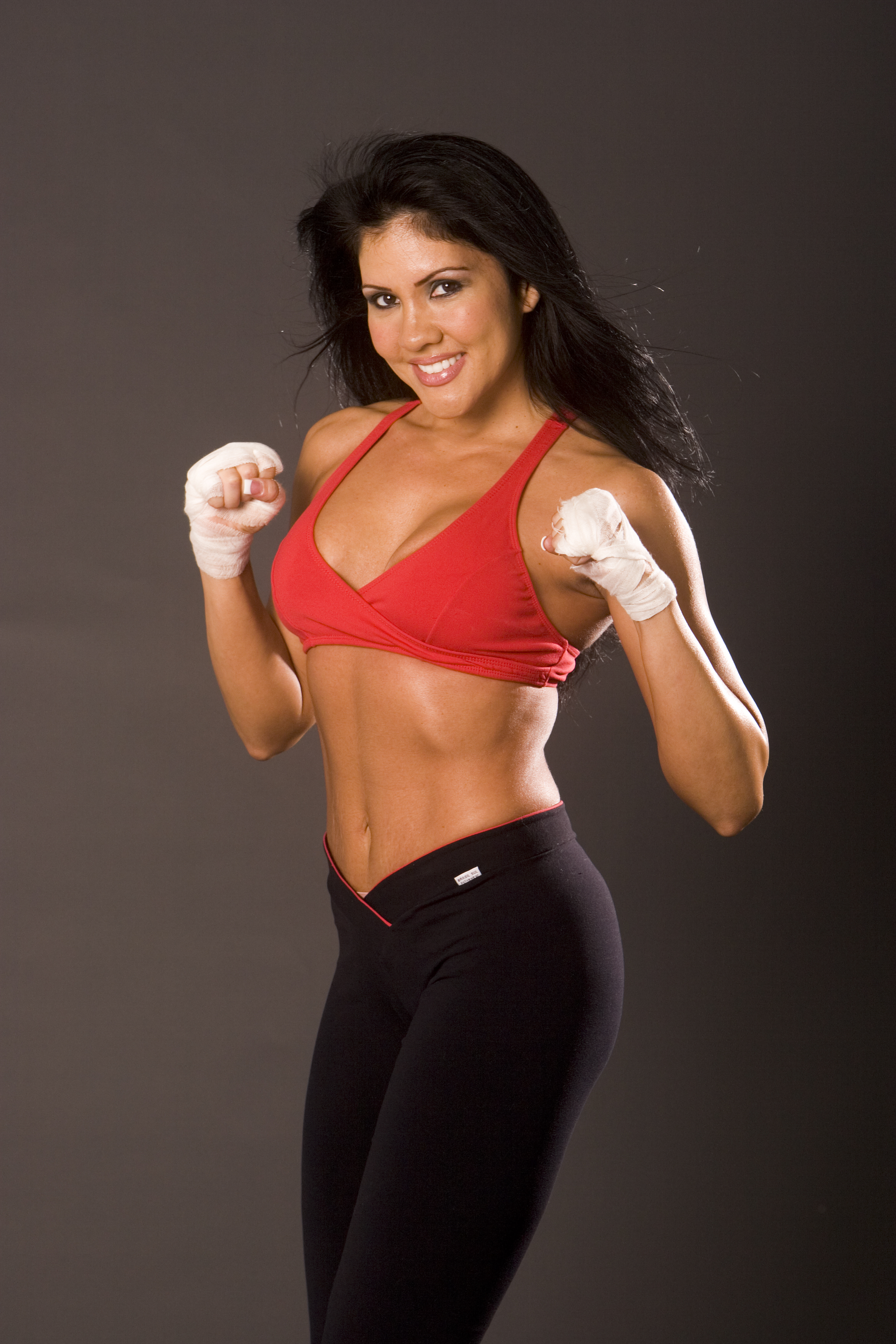
World champion Mia St John

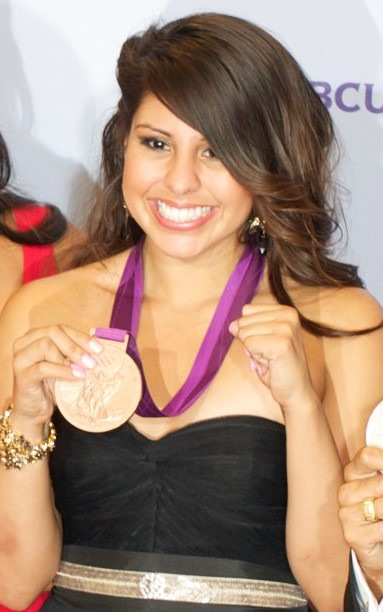
Olympic medalist Marlen Esparza

- Oscar Albarado – light middleweight champion
- Art Aragon – lightweight boxer
- Baby Arizmendi – title holder, Hall of Famer
- Chris Arreola – heavyweight boxer
- Paulie Ayala – WBA bantamweight champion
- Tony Ayala Jr. – junior middleweight boxer
- Carlos Balderas – professional boxer
- Tony Baltazar – professional boxer
- Arnold Barboza Jr. – professional boxer
- David Benavidez – WBC super middleweight champion
- José Benavidez Jr. – WBA interim light welterweight champion
- Norberto Bravo – professional boxer
- Gaby Canizales – bantamweight world champion boxer
- Orlando Canizales – bantamweight world champion boxer, Hall of Famer
- Michael Carbajal – four-time light flyweight champion boxer, Hall of Famer
- Ruben Castillo – professional boxer
- Bobby Chacon – two-time champion boxer, Hall of Famer
- Jesús Chávez – two division world champion
- Jackie Chavez – female boxer and IFBA World super bantamweight champion
- Rudy Cisneros – boxer, Contender contestant
- Diego Corrales – super featherweight and lightweight champion
- Steve Cruz – featherweight champion
- Alberto Dávila – bantamweight champion
- Oscar De La Hoya – ten-time world champion, Hall of Famer
- David Díaz – WBC lightweight champion
- Joseph Diaz – IBF super featherweight champion
- Juan Díaz – WBA and WBO and IBF World lightweight champion
- Marlen Esparza – 2012 women's boxing bronze medalist
- Louie Espinoza – WBA featherweight champion
- Brandon Figueroa – WBC super bantamweight champion
- Omar Figueroa Jr. – WBC lightweight champion
- Alexander Flores – professional boxer
- B. J. Flores – professional boxer
- Joshua Franco – WBA super flyweight champion
- Arturo Frias – world champion
- Alex García – heavyweight boxer
- Roberto Garcia – IBF super featherweight champion
- Ryan Garcia – professional boxer
- Miguel Ángel García – featherweight, super featherweight and lightweight champion, brother of Roberto Garcia
- Jaime Garza – WBC Super bantamweight
- Loreto Garza – world champion light welterweight
- Frankie Gómez – lightweight prospect
- Jaime Manuel Gómez – Mexican-American professional boxer in the Light Middleweight division
- Delia Gonzalez – flyweight female boxer
- Jesús González – amateur champion and Super middleweight contender
- Paul Gonzales – flyweight Olympic gold medalist
- Rodolfo Gonzales – boxer, poet, and leader of the Chicano civil rights movement
- Robert Guerrero – IBF featherweight and super featherweight champion
- Genaro Hernández – WBA and WBC super featherweight champion, Hall of famer
- Jesse James Leija – world champion boxer
- Don Jordan – world welterweight champion
- Willie Jorrín – WBC super bantamweight champion
- Rocky Juarez – Olympic silver medalist
- Brandun Lee – professional boxer
- Richie Lemos – professional boxer
- Carlos Licona – professional boxer
- Danny Lopez – world featherweight champion, Hall of Famer
- Josesito López – professional boxer
- Tony Lopez – three-time world champion
- Steven Luevano – WBO featherweight champion
- Jesse Magdaleno – WBO super bantamweight champion
- Raúl Márquez – world champion boxer and boxing announcer
- Abner Mares – bantamweight, super bantamweight and featherweight champion
- Antonio Margarito – WBO welterweight champion
- Sergio Mora – WBC super welterweight world champion
- Manuel Ortiz – world bantamweight champion, Hall of Famer
- Victor Ortiz – WBC welterweight champion
- Vergil Ortiz Jr. – professional boxer
- Bobby Pacho – professional boxer
- Zack Padilla – light welterweight champion
- Robert Quiroga – IBF superflyweight champion
- José Ramírez – WBC and WBO light welterweight champion
- Mando Ramos – lightweight champion
- Daniel Roman – WBA super bantamweight champion
- Andy Ruiz Jr. – WBA (Super), IBF, WBO and IBO heavyweight champion
- Danny Romero – world champion boxer
- Brandon Ríos – WBA lightweight champion
- David Rodriguez – undefeated heavyweight boxer
- Raul Rojas – WBA featherweight champion
- Joseph Salas – featherweight Olympic silver medalist
- Martha Salazar – WBC heavyweight boxing champion
- Abel Sanchez – professional boxing trainer
- Richie Sandoval – bantamweight champion
- Alex Saucedo – professional boxer
- Maureen Shea – professional boxer, known as the "Real Million Dollar Baby"
- Solly Smith – first Latino featherweight champion of the world
- Mia St. John – WBC champion, professional female boxer
- Johnny Tapia – five-time flyweight, bantamweight and featherweight champion, Hall of famer
- Jesse Valdez – Olympic bronze medalist (1972)
- Fernando Vargas – two-time light middleweight champion
- Jessie Vargas – WBA super lightweight and WBO welterweight champion
- Jose Zepeda – professional boxer

=== Football (soccer) ===
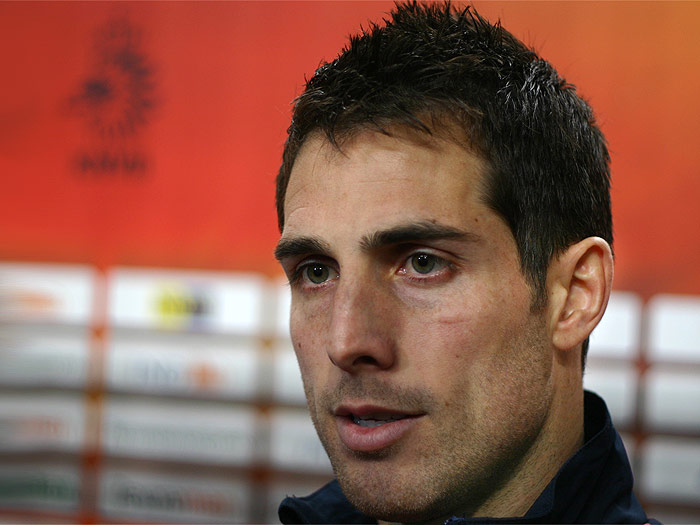
Carlos Bocanegra served as the US team captain for six years

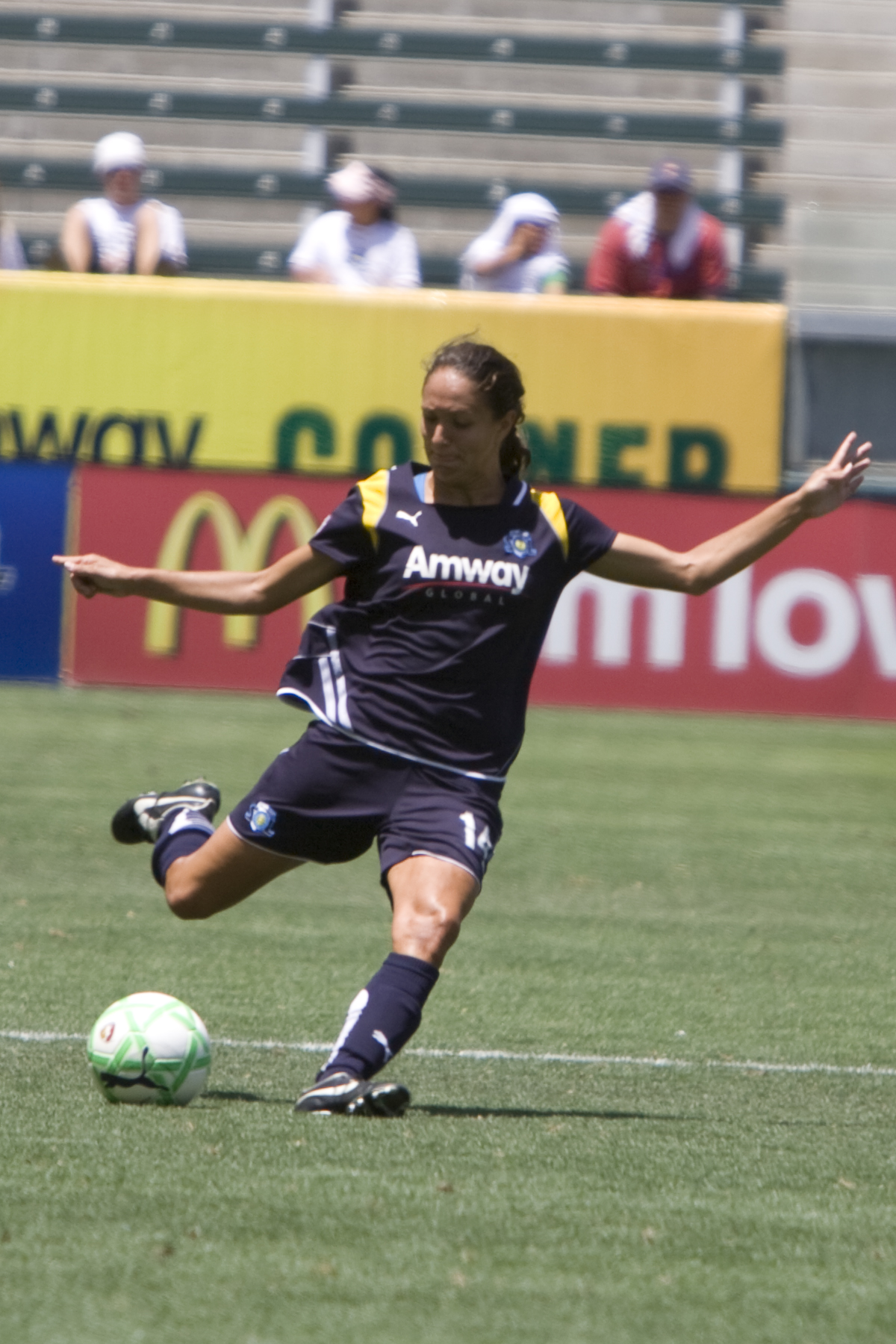
Stephanie (Lopez) Cox, U.S. Woman's National Team Olympic gold medalist

- Jackie Acevedo – striker
- Isaac Acuña – midfielder
- Emily Alvarado – goalkeeper
- Mónica Alvarado – defender, international footballer
- Ventura Alvarado – defender
- Alejandro Alvarado Jr. – midfielder
- Efraín Álvarez – midfielder
- Carlos Alvarez – midfielder
- Frankie Amaya – midfielder
- Daniel Antúnez – midfielder
- Fernando Arce Jr. – midfielder
- Julián Araujo – defender
- Esteban Arias – defender
- Eder Arreola – midfielder
- Luis Arriaga – midfielder
- Paul Arriola – midfielder
- Josh Atencio – midfielder
- Eric Avila – midfielder
- Carlos Avilez – goalkeeper
- Fidel Barajas – midfielder
- Ivan Becerra – forward
- Carlos Bocanegra – center back and captain of the US National Team
- Carlos Borja – defender
- Jonathan Bornstein – defender and midfielder
- Jose Burciaga Jr. – defender
- Christina Burkenroad – forward
- Ariana Calderón – striker
- Javier Casas – midfielder
- Edgar Castillo – defender
- Bri Campos – defender
- Servando Carrasco – midfielder
- Nico Carrera – defender
- Edwin Cerrillo – midfielder
- Alfonso Ocampo-Chavez – forward
- Julian Chavez – midfielder
- Joe Corona – midfielder
- Antonietta Collins – sports commentator and soccer player, daughter of the well-known television reporter María Antonieta Collins
- Chris Cortez – forward
- Ramiro Corrales – midfielder
- Cade Cowell – forward
- Stephanie Cox – defender, Olympic gold medalist
- Renae Cuéllar – forward
- Daniel Cuevas – winger
- Mauricio Cuevas – defender
- A. J. DeLaGarza – defender
- Marco Delgado – midfielder
- Erik Dueñas – defender
- David Estrada – defender
- Marco Farfan – defender
- Janelly Farias – defender
- Omir Fernandez – attacking midfielder
- Vidal Fernandez – midfielder
- Dennis Flores – midfielder
- Jorge Flores – midfielder
- Monica Flores – leftback
- Jaime Frías – defender
- Joe Gallardo – forward
- Christopher Garcia – forward
- Freddie Garcia – forward
- Irving Garcia – midfielder
- Natalie Garcia – defender
- Nick Garcia – defender
- Poli Garcia – midfielder
- Rafael Garcia – midfielder
- Alina Garciamendez – defender
- Greg Garza – defender
- Monica Gerardo – coach and former player
- Luis Gil – midfielder
- Alejandro Guido – attacking midfielder
- Elizabeth Gómez – defender
- Francisco Gomez – midfielder
- Herculez Gomez – forward
- Johan Gomez – forward
- Jonathan Gómez – defender
- Daniel Gonzalez – midfielder
- Jesse González – goalkeeper
- Jonathan Gonzalez – midfielder
- Miguel Gonzalez – midfielder
- Mónica Gonzalez – forward
- Omar Gonzalez – defender
- Antonio De La Torre – defender
- Luis Gil – midfielder
- Sonny Guadarrama – midfielder
- Anisa Guajardo – striker
- Brian Gutiérrez – midfielder
- Diego Gutiérrez – forward
- Nancy Gutiérrez – defender
- Bianca Henninger – goalkeeper
- Alonso Hernández – attacking midfielder
- Daniel Hernández – defender
- Jorge Hernandez – midfielder
- Laurie Hill – midfielder
- Sofia Huerta – forward
- Miguel Ibarra – midfielder
- Rafael Jauregui – midfielder
- Hector Jiménez – defender
- Benji Joya – midfielder
- Freddy Juarez – defender
- Da'vian Kimbrough – forward
- Kiki Lara – midfielder, coach
- Richard Ledezma – midfielder
- Danny Leyva – midfielder
- Ulysses Llanez – forward
- Aaron Lopez – defender
- Mikey Lopez – midfielder
- Rodrigo López – midfielder
- Christian Lucatero – midfielder
- Diego Luna – midfielder
- Richie Marquez – defender
- Alma Martínez – defender
- Antonio Martínez – midfielder
- Gerardo Mascareño – forward
- John Matkin – midfielder
- Cruz Medina – midfielder
- Annia Mejia – defender
- Alex Mendez – midfielder
- Ruben Mendoza – forward
- Martha Moore – defender
- Susana Mora – defender
- Julio César Morales – forward
- Amando Moreno – forward
- Mike Muñoz – midfielder
- Santiago Muñóz – forward
- Christina Murillo – defender
- Lisa Nanez – forward
- Teresa Noyola – attacking midfielder, international player
- Ernest Nungaray – forward
- Juan Pablo Ocegueda – left back
- Gina Oceguera – defender
- David Ochoa – goalkeeper
- Emmanuel Ochoa – goalkeeper
- Sammy Ochoa – forward
- Nathan Ordaz – forward
- Diana Ordóñez – forward
- Emilio Orozco – defender
- Michael Orozco Fiscal – defender
- Ralph Orquin – left back
- Rey Ortiz – forward
- Jesús Padilla – forward, striker
- Miguel Palafox – defender
- Amanda Perez – midfielder
- Ricardo Pepi – forward
- Jonathan Perez – attacking midfielder
- Orlando Perez – defender
- Veronica Perez – forward
- Bruno Piceno – striker
- Mauricio Pineda – defender
- Miguel Ángel Ponce – defender, Olympic gold medalist
- Linnea Quinones – goalkeeper
- Maricarmen Reyes – midfielder, UANL Tigres Feminil
- Nick Rimando – goalkeeper
- Allan Rodríguez – midfielder
- Mario Rodriguez – forward
- Memo Rodríguez – midfielder
- Arianna Romero – defender
- César Romero – forward
- Rubio Rubin – forward
- Adrián Ruelas – striker
- Jennifer Ruiz – midfielder, defender
- Jorge Ruvalcaba – winger
- Katie Johnson – forward, international footballer
- Jorge Salcedo – defender
- Hugo Salcedo – forward, coach
- Omar Salgado – forward and midfielder
- Shea Salinas – winger
- Tanya Samarzich – forward
- Ashley Sanchez – forward
- Keri Sanchez – defender, coach
- Maria Sánchez – midfielder
- Richard Sánchez – goalkeeper
- Marlene Sandoval – defender
- Sebastian Saucedo – midfielder
- Bianca Sierra – defender, international footballer
- Luis Silva – midfielder
- Sebastian Soto – forward
- Jonathan Top – forward
- Antonio de la Torre – midfielder
- Arturo Torres – defender
- Christian Torres – forward
- José Francisco Torres – midfielder
- Dioselina Valderrama – midfielder
- Obed Vargas – midfielder
- Jose Vasquez – defender
- Julián Vázquez – forward
- Martin Vasquez – midfielder and head coach
- Brandon Vazquez – forward
- Jesús Antonio Vázquez – left back
- Marco Vidal – midfielder
- Jaime Villarreal – midfielder
- Jorge Villafaña – defender
- Jose Villarreal – forward
- Natalie Vinti – defender
- William Yarbrough – goalkeeper
- Carlos Zavala – midfielder
- Adrian Zendejas – goalkeeper
- Alejandro Zendejas – midfielder
- Veronica Zepeda – forward

=== Golf ===
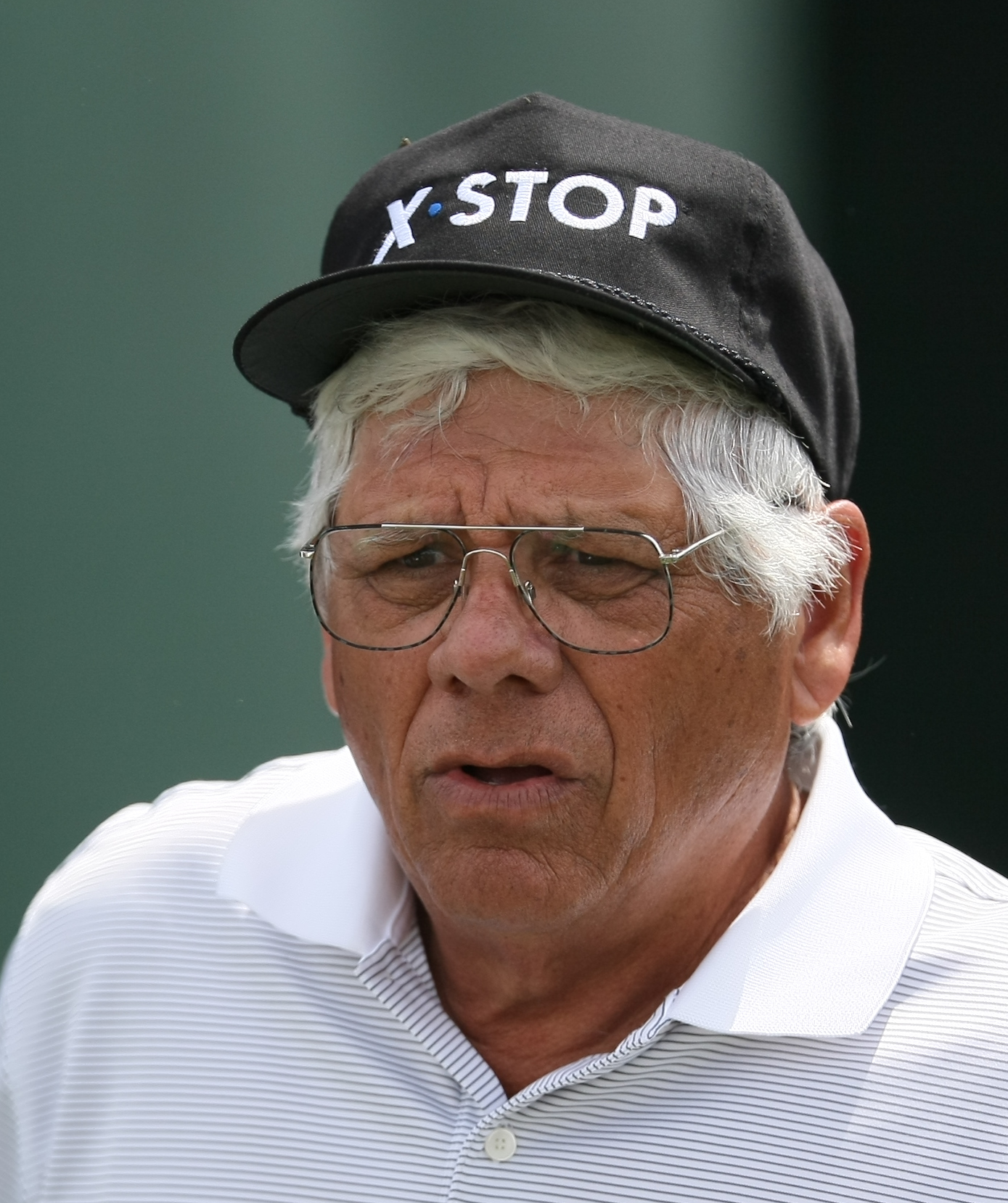
Lee Trevino

- Abraham Ancer – professional golfer
- Alex Aragon – professional golfer
- Homero Blancas – PGA tour winner
- Sam Chavez – professional golfer
- Abe Espinosa – first Hispanic-American to win a championship
- Al Espinosa – PGA tour winner
- Armando Favela – professional golfer
- Robert Gamez – PGA tour winner
- Ernie Gonzalez – PGA tour winner
- Tony Holguin – PGA tour winner
- Joe Jimenez – PGA Senior's champion
- Pat Perez – PGA tour winner
- Nancy Lopez – Hall of Fame American professional golfer
- Lizette Salas – LPGA tour winner
- J. J. Spaun – PGA tour winner
- Lee Trevino – Hall of Fame American professional golfer

=== Ice hockey ===
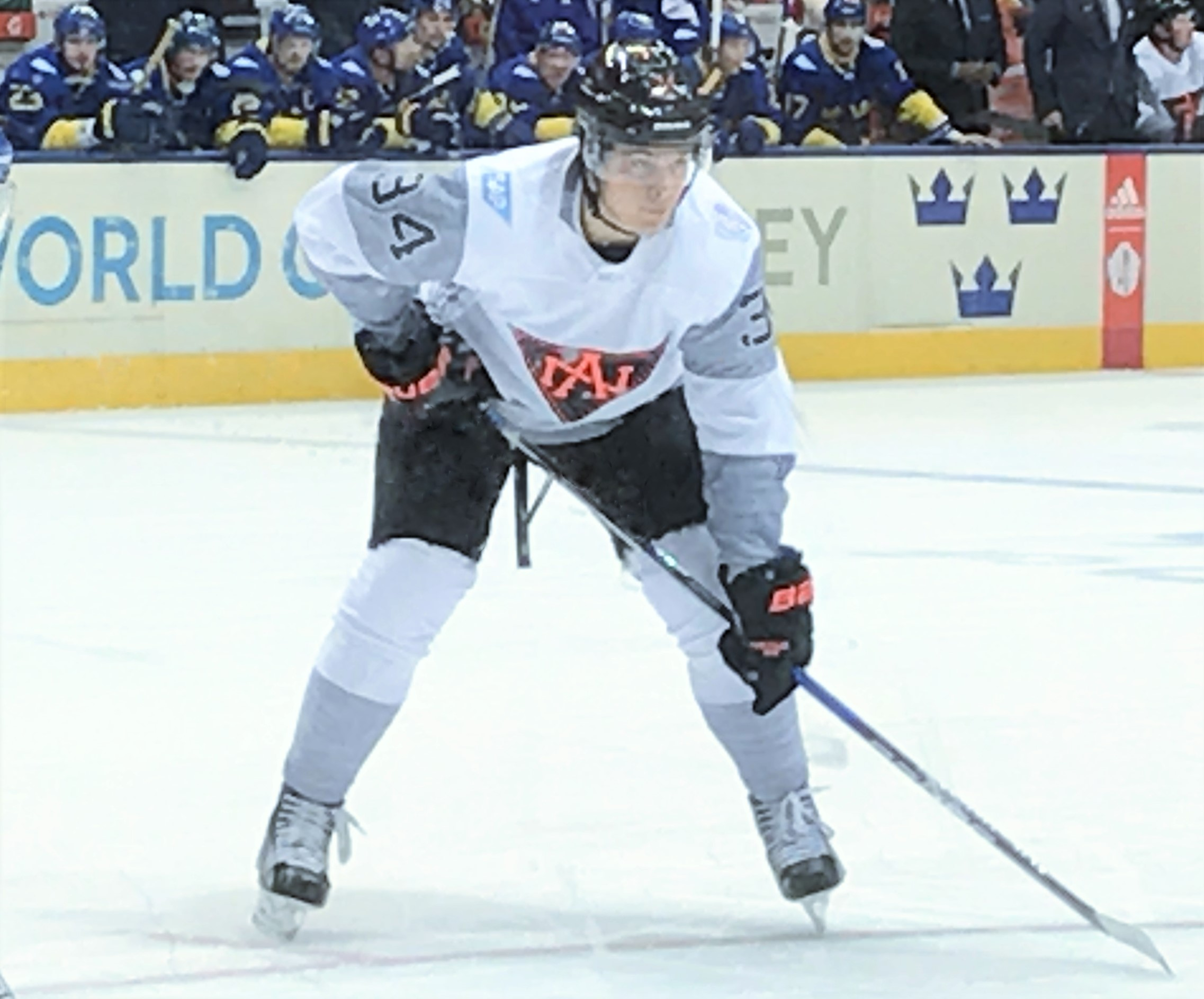
NHL No. 1 pick Auston Matthews

- Scott Gomez – NHL center
- Max Pacioretty – NHL left wing
- Auston Matthews – NHL center
- Matthew Nieto – NHL left wing
- Rhett Rakhshani – NHL right wing

=== Mixed martial arts ===
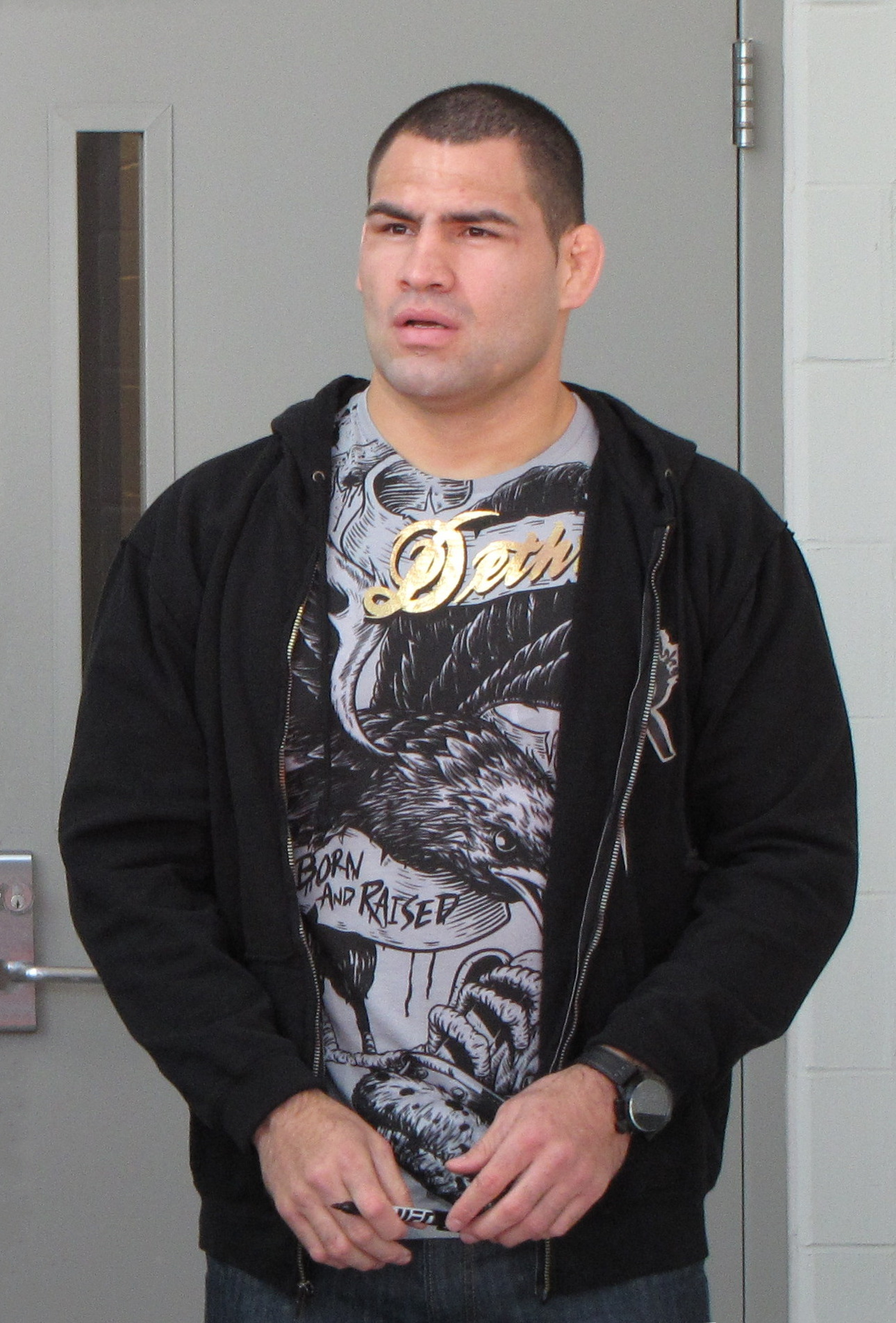
Cain Velasquez

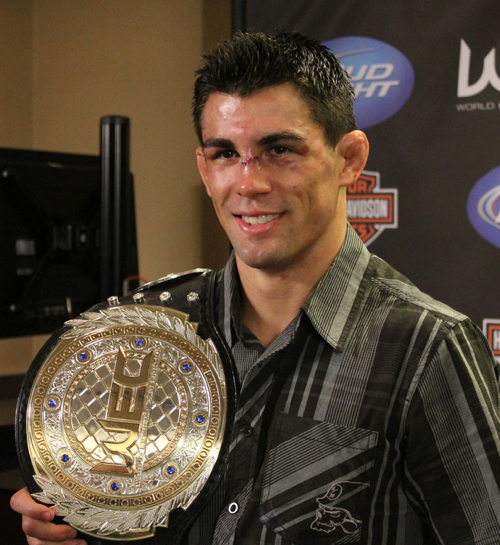
Dominick Cruz

- Joseph Benavidez – UFC, mixed martial arts
- Eddie Bravo – mixed martial arts, Brazilian jiu-jitsu and Submission grappling
- Paul Buentello – UFC, mixed martial arts
- Graciela Casillas – kickboxing and boxing title holder, martial arts practitioner
- Henry Cejudo – UFC champion, mixed martial arts
- Carlos Condit – UFC champion, mixed martial arts
- Dominick Cruz – UFC champion, mixed martial arts
- Nate Diaz – UFC, mixed martial arts TUF Winner
- Nick Diaz – UFC, mixed martial arts
- Carla Esparza – UFC champion, mixed martial arts
- Tony Ferguson – mixed martial arts TUF Winner
- Justin Gaethje – UFC champion, mixed martial arts, former collegiate wrestler
- Kelvin Gastelum – mixed martial arts TUF Winner
- Anthony Hernandez – UFC, mixed martial arts
- Josh Hokit - UFC, mixed martial arts
- Roger Huerta – Bellator, mixed martial arts
- Juanito Ibarra – mixed martial arts and boxing trainer
- Ricardo Lamas – UFC, mixed martial arts
- Jonathan Martinez – UFC, mixed martial artist of Mexican and Salvadorian descent
- Rob McCullough – Muay Thai kickboxing, mixed martial arts
- Gilbert Melendez – Strikeforce champion, UFC mixed martial arts
- Brian Ortega – UFC, mixed martial arts
- Tito Ortiz – UFC champion, mixed martial arts
- Damacio Page – UFC, mixed martial arts
- Julianna Peña – UFC, mixed martial arts
- Alex Perez – UFC, mixed martial arts
- Anthony Pettis – UFC champion, mixed martial arts
- Sergio Pettis – UFC, mixed martial arts
- Dominick Reyes – UFC, mixed martial arts
- Ricco Rodriguez – UFC champion, mixed martial arts
- Mia St. John – tae kwon do champion
- Diego Sanchez – UFC, mixed martial arts TUF 1 Winner
- Emmanuel Sanchez – Bellator, mixed martial arts
- Frank Shamrock – UFC champion, mixed martial arts
- Joe Soto – Bellator champion, UFC mixed martial arts
- Jeremy Stephens – UFC, mixed martial arts
- Joe Stevenson – UFC, mixed martial arts
- Cub Swanson – UFC, mixed martial arts
- Manny Tapia – mixed martial arts
- Josh Thomson – Strikeforce champion, UFC mixed martial arts
- Miguel Torres – WEC champion, UFC mixed martial arts
- Charlie Valencia – mixed martial arts
- Cain Velasquez – UFC heavyweight champion, mixed martial arts
- Joey Villasenor – mixed martial arts
- Adrian Yañez – UFC, mixed martial arts

=== Wrestling ===
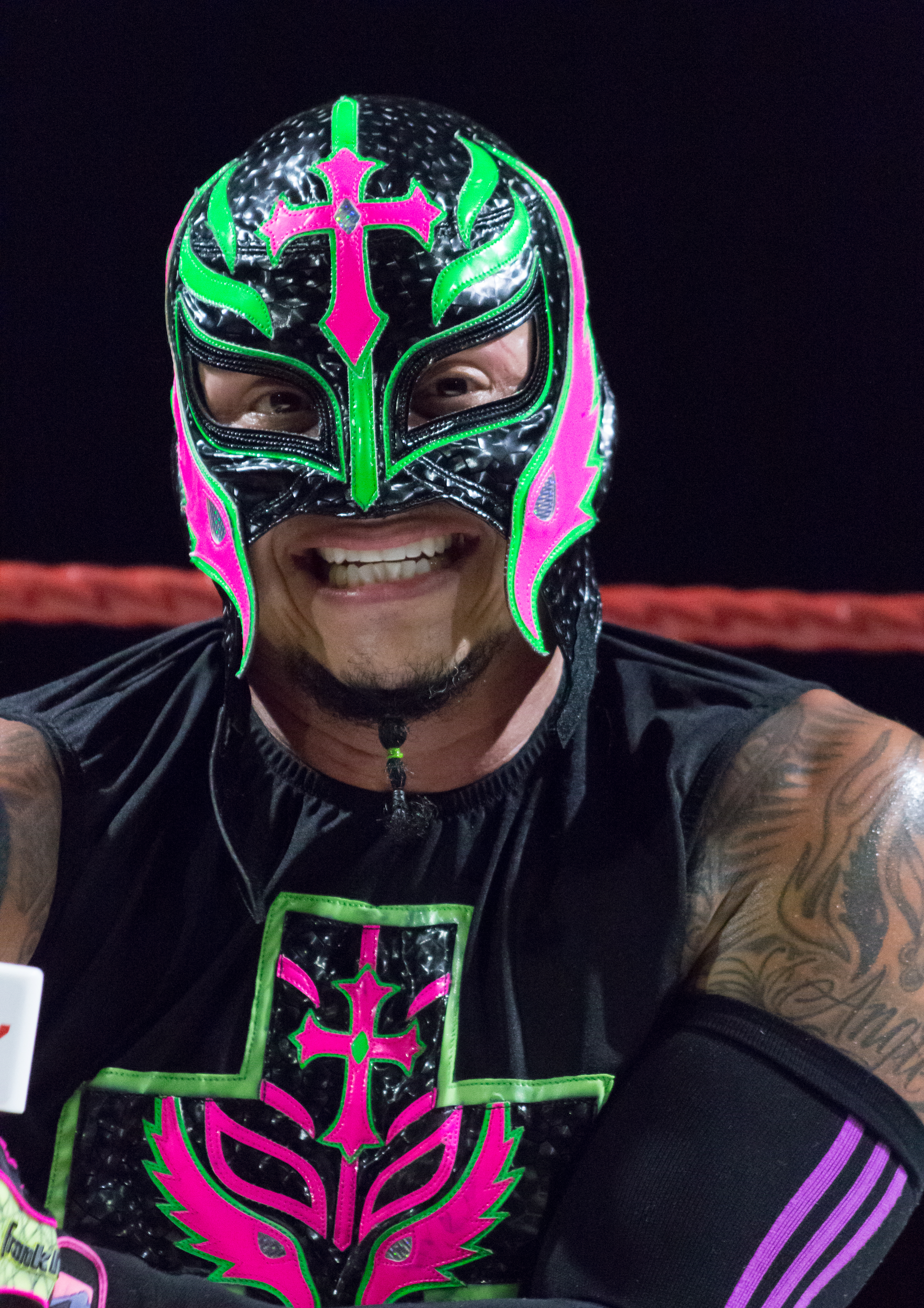
Rey Mysterio

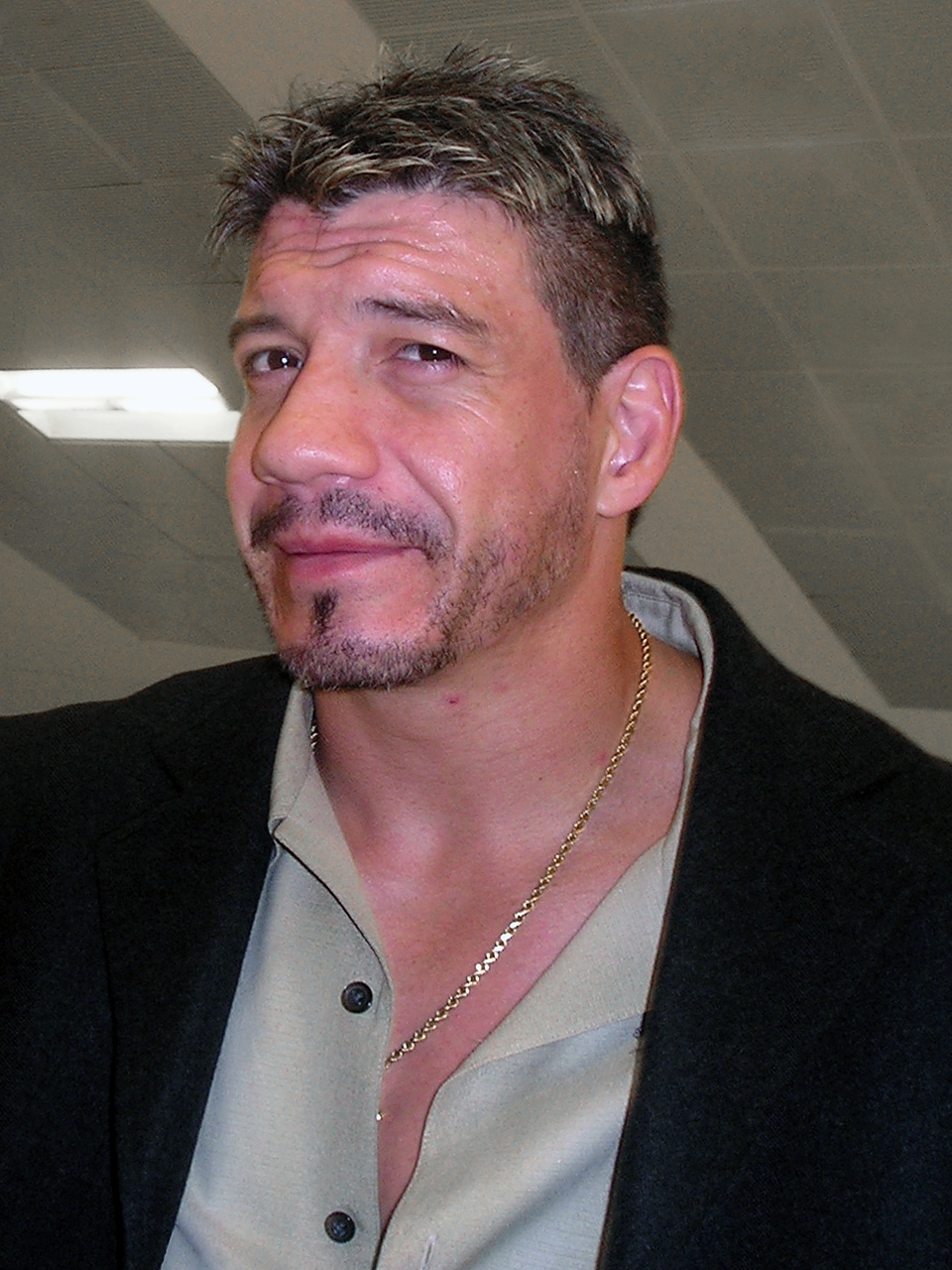
Eddie Guerrero

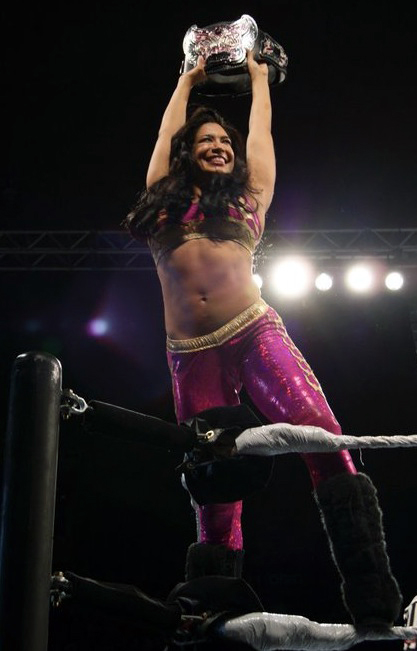
Three-time WWE Women's Champion Melina Perez

- Aaron Aguilera – professional wrestler
- The Bella Twins – professional wrestlers
- Bayley – professional wrestler
- Sin Cara – professional wrestler
- Manny Fernandez – professional wrestler
- Pepper Gomez – professional wrestler
- Chavo Guerrero Sr. – professional wrestler
- Chavo Guerrero Jr. – professional wrestler
- Eddie Guerrero – professional wrestler
- Gory Guerrero – professional wrestler
- Hector Guerrero – professional wrestler
- Mando Guerrero – professional wrestler
- Gino Hernandez – professional wrestler
- Shawn Hernandez – professional wrestler
- Incognito – professional wrestler
- Kaitlyn – professional wrestler
- Kalisto – professional wrestler
- Paul London – professional wrestler
- Eva Marie – professional wrestler
- Dominik Mysterio – professional wrestler
- Rey Mysterio – professional wrestler
- Magno – professional wrestler
- Shelly Martinez – professional wrestler
- Misterioso – professional wrestler
- JoJo Offerman – professional wrestler
- Persephone – professional wrestler
- Roxanne Perez – professional wrestler
- Melina Perez – professional wrestler
- Johnny Rodz – professional wrestler
- Ricky Romero – professional wrestler
- Tito Santana – professional wrestler
- José Luis Jair Soria – professional wrestler
- Enrique Torres – professional wrestler
- Lady Victoria – professional wrestler
- Chris Youngblood – professional wrestler
- Jay Youngblood – professional wrestler

=== Other sports ===
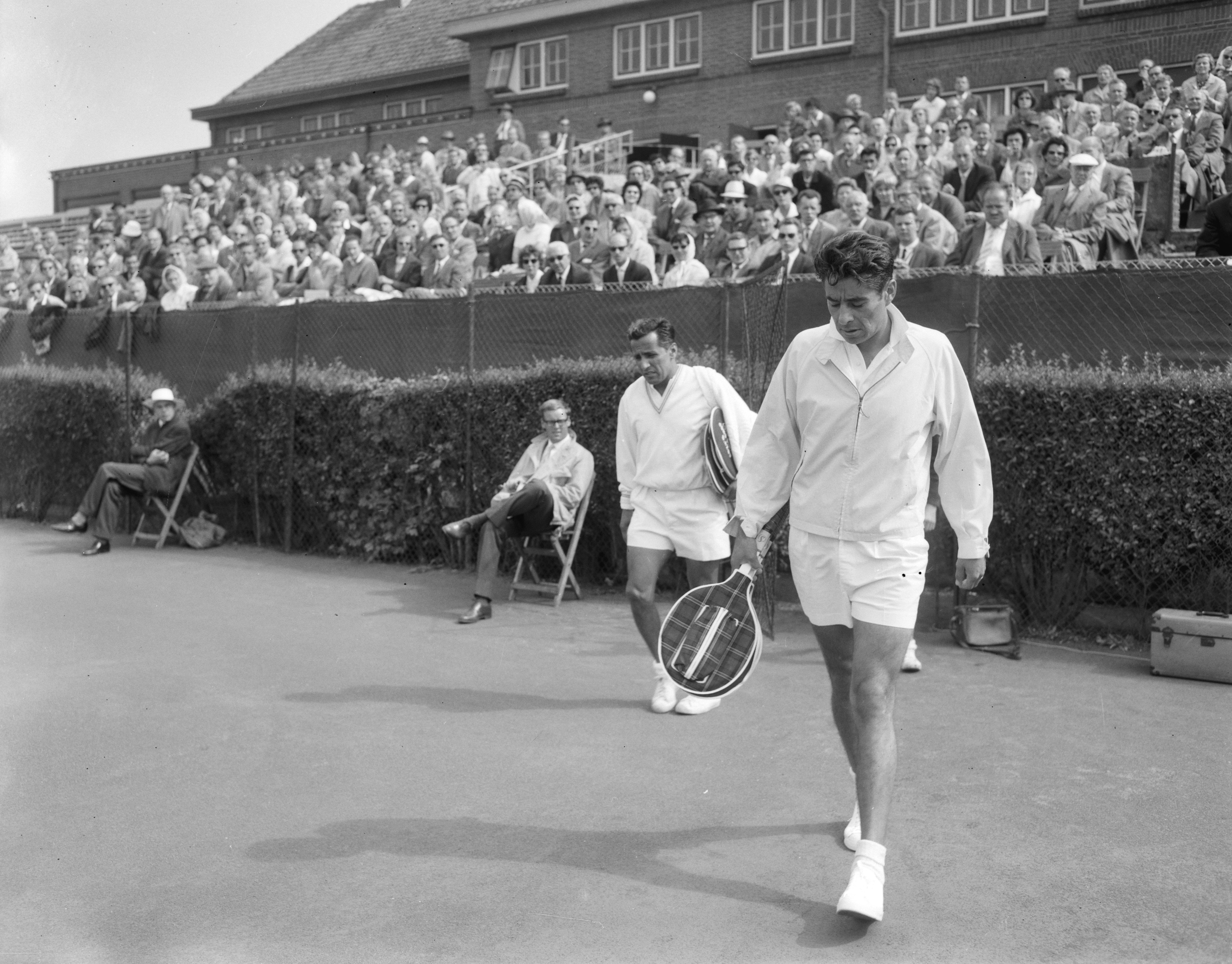
Pancho Gonzales was the World No. 1 tennis player for an all-time record eight years from 1952 to 1960.

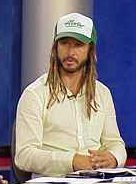
Tony Alva is among the most influential skateboarders of all time.

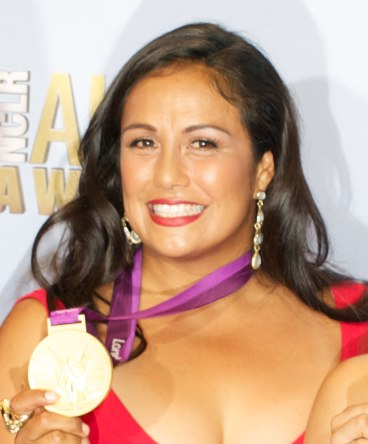
U.S. Olympian Brenda Villa, the most decorated athlete in women's water polo

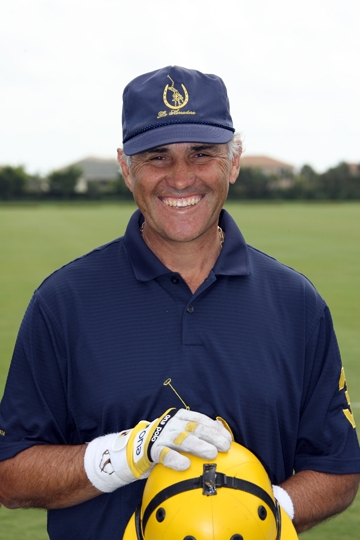
Guillermo Gracida Jr. is considered one of the greatest polo players of all time, along with his brother Carlos.

- David Aldana – professional motorcycle racer
- Tony Alva – professional skateboarder, founding member of the Z-Boys.
- Anita Alvarez – synchronized swimmer, Olympic medalist
- Olga Appell – Olympic Track and Field Athlete, winner of the LA Marathon
- Inaki Basauri – rugby union player, member the U.S. national team
- Crystl Bustos – softball player, two-time Olympic Gold and silver medalist
- Steve Caballero – professional skateboarder, pioneer of vertical skating
- Miguel de Capriles – fencer, two time Olympic medalist, and President of the FIE
- Patricia Cardenas – world champion water polo gold medalist
- Henry Cejudo – freestyle wrestler and Olympic gold medalist
- Michael Chacon – professional fixed gear freestyle bike rider
- Antonio Cruz – cyclist, US National Criterium Champion
- Ronnie Deleon – two-time World kickboxing champion
- Erica Dittmer – swimmer
- Ernesto Escobedo – tennis player
- David R. Flores – jockey
- Gary Gabelich – motorsport driver, set the Land Speed Record
- Rudy Galindo – figure skater, U.S. National champion
- Jackie Galloway – taekwondo competitor, Olympic medalist
- Martin Garcia – jockey
- Angélica Gavaldón – tennis player
- Memo Gidley – race car driver
- Mark Gonzales – skateboarder, named by the Transworld Skateboarding magazine as the "Most Influential Skateboarder of all Time"
- Pancho Gonzales – professional tennis player, regarded as one of the greatest of all time.
- Carlos Gracida – polo player, hall of fame member
- Guillermo Gracida Jr. – polo player, hall of fame member
- Natalia Grossman – professional competition climber
- Jesus Hernandez – race car driver
- Danny Herrera – weightlifting powerlifter
- Jessa Khan – ju-jitsu practitioner, international gold medalist
- Ricardo Laguna – professional BMX rider and television personality
- Arlene Limas – taekwondo, Olympic gold medalist
- Andy Lopez – college baseball coach
- Rob Machado – surfer
- Leonel Manzano – middle-distance runner, Olympic silver medalist
- Bobby Martinez – professional surfer
- Brenda Martinez – track and field athlete
- Mario Martinez – weightlifting powerlifter Olympic silver medalist (1984)
- Rachel McLish – bodybuilder, first Ms. Olympia champion
- Marten Mendez – badminton player, U.S. national title winner
- Jessica Mendoza – softball player and Olympic Gold and silver medalist
- Marc Frank Montoya – professional snowboarder
- Juan Moreno – taekwondo, two-time Olympic silver medalist
- Sylvia Mosqueda – long-distance runner
- Justine Wong-Orantes – volleyball player, Olympic gold medalist
- Derek Parra – professional speed skater and Olympic gold medalist
- Kevin Peraza – BMX freestyle rider, two-time X Games gold medalist
- Cruz Pedregon – two-time drag racing champion
- Tony Pedregon – two-time drag racing champion
- Tori Pena – pole vaulter
- Stacy Peralta – professional skateboarder, founding member of the Z-Boys
- Sarah Robles – weightlifter, Olympic medalist
- Paul Rodriguez Jr. – professional skateboarder
- Rico Roman – ice sledge hockey player, Paralympics gold medalist and Purple Heart recipient
- Gene Romero – professional motorcycle racer, winner of the 1970 A.M.A. Grand National Championship and the 1975 Daytona 200
- Leo Romero – professional skateboarder
- Sierra Romero – softball player, first player to record 300 runs, 300 hits and 300 RBI in NCAA history
- Jesse Ruíz – wrestler
- Oz Sanchez – handcyclist and triathlete, six-time Paralympic Games medalist
- Cristian Soratos – middle-distance runner
- Tracee Talavera – gymnast, Olympic silver medalist
- Jorge Torres – long-distance runner
- Vanessa Torres – professional skateboarder
- Tony Trujillo – professional skateboarder
- Benny Urquidez – World kickboxing champion
- Ismael Valenzuela – Kentucky Derby winner
- Patrick Valenzuela – Kentucky Derby and Preakness Stakes winner
- Brenda Villa – World Class water polo player, Olympic gold, silver and bronze medalist

== Arts and entertainment ==
=== Actors and media personalities ===
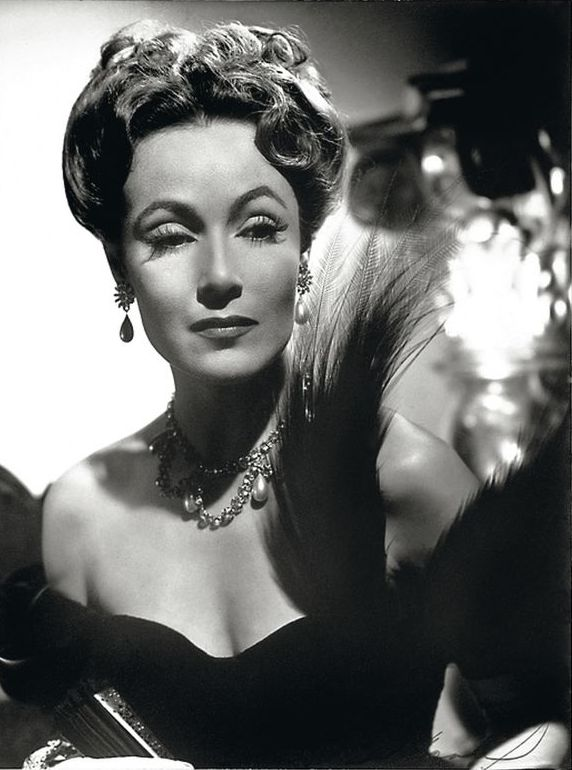
Dolores del Río

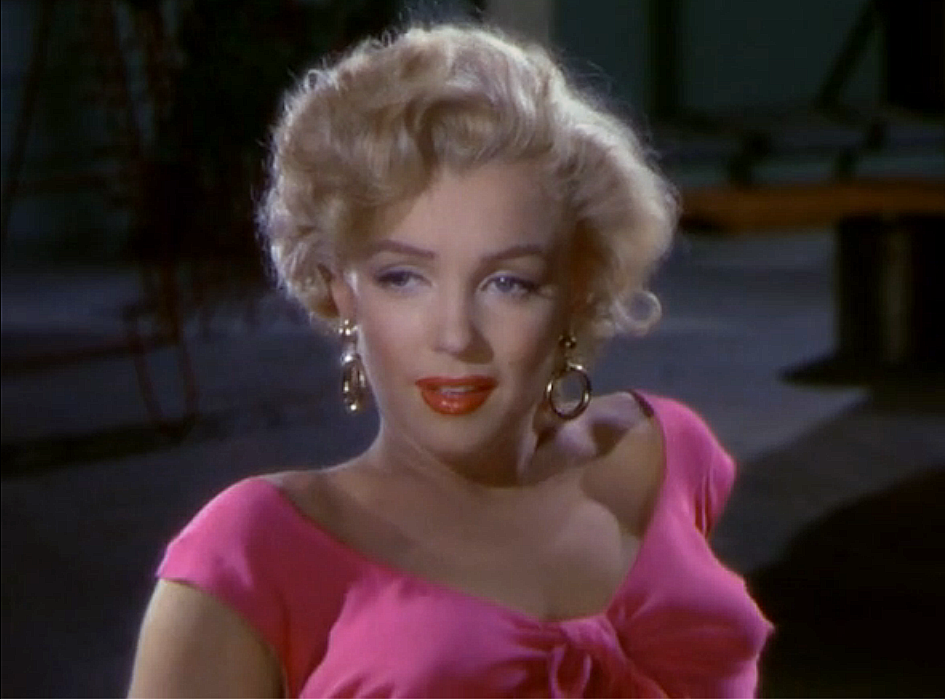
Marilyn Monroe

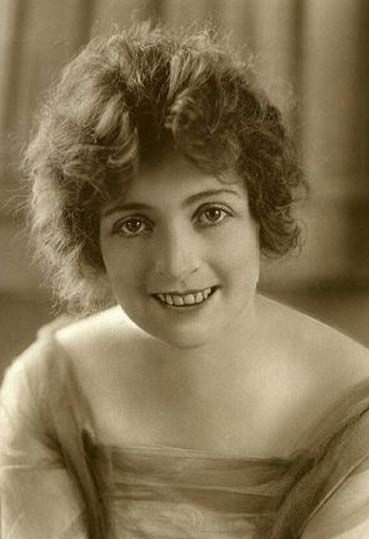
Myrtle Gonzalez

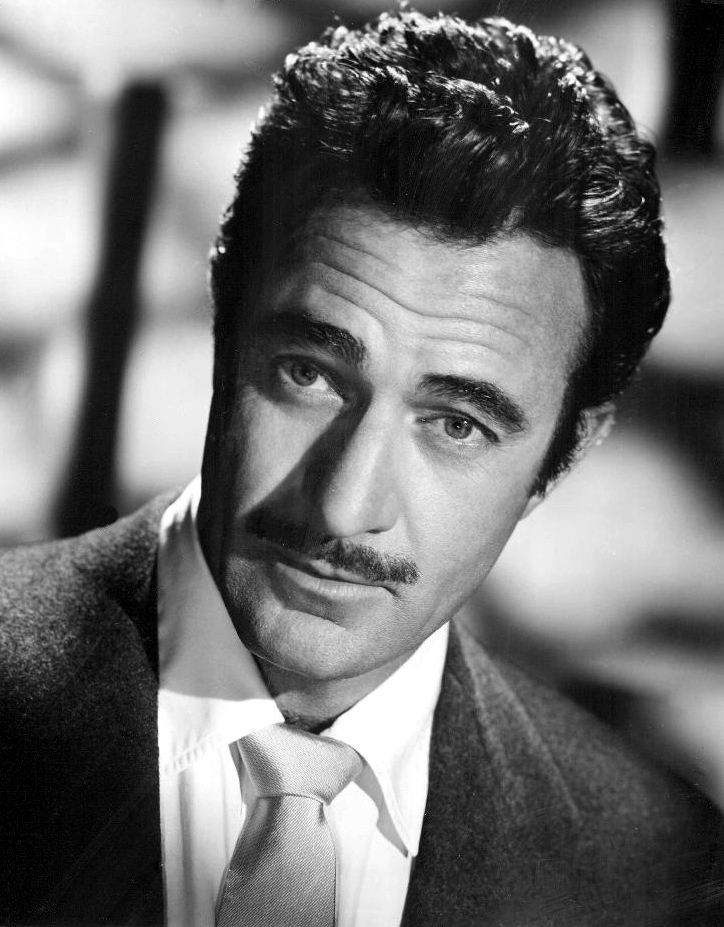
Gilbert Roland

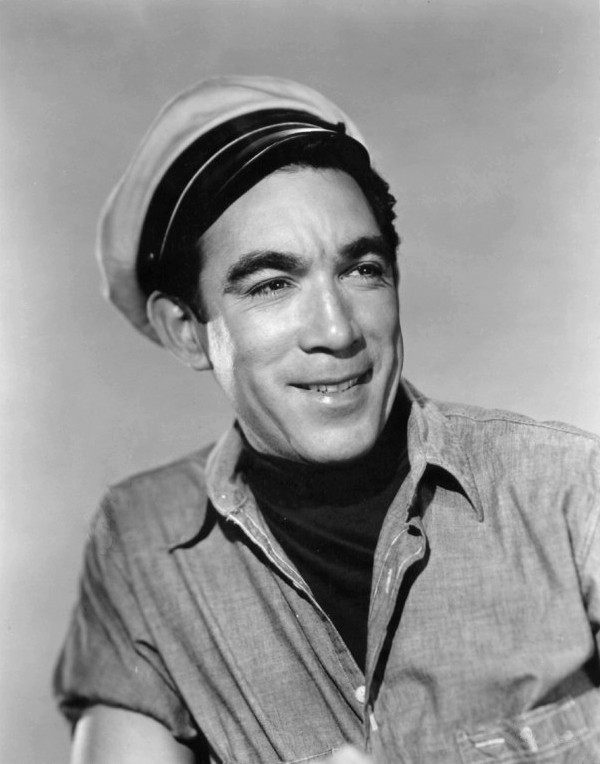
Anthony Quinn

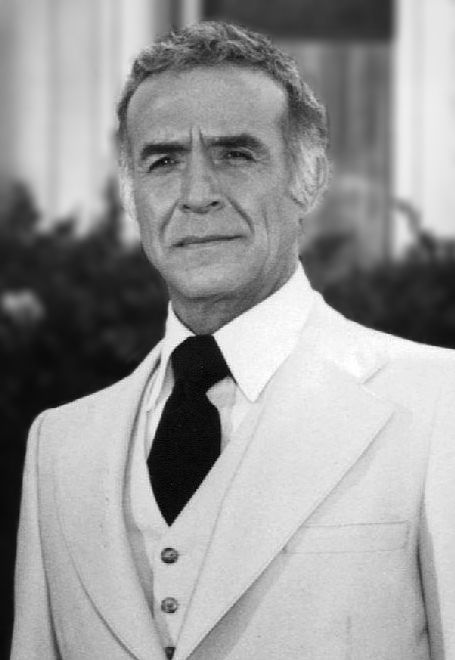
Ricardo Montalbán

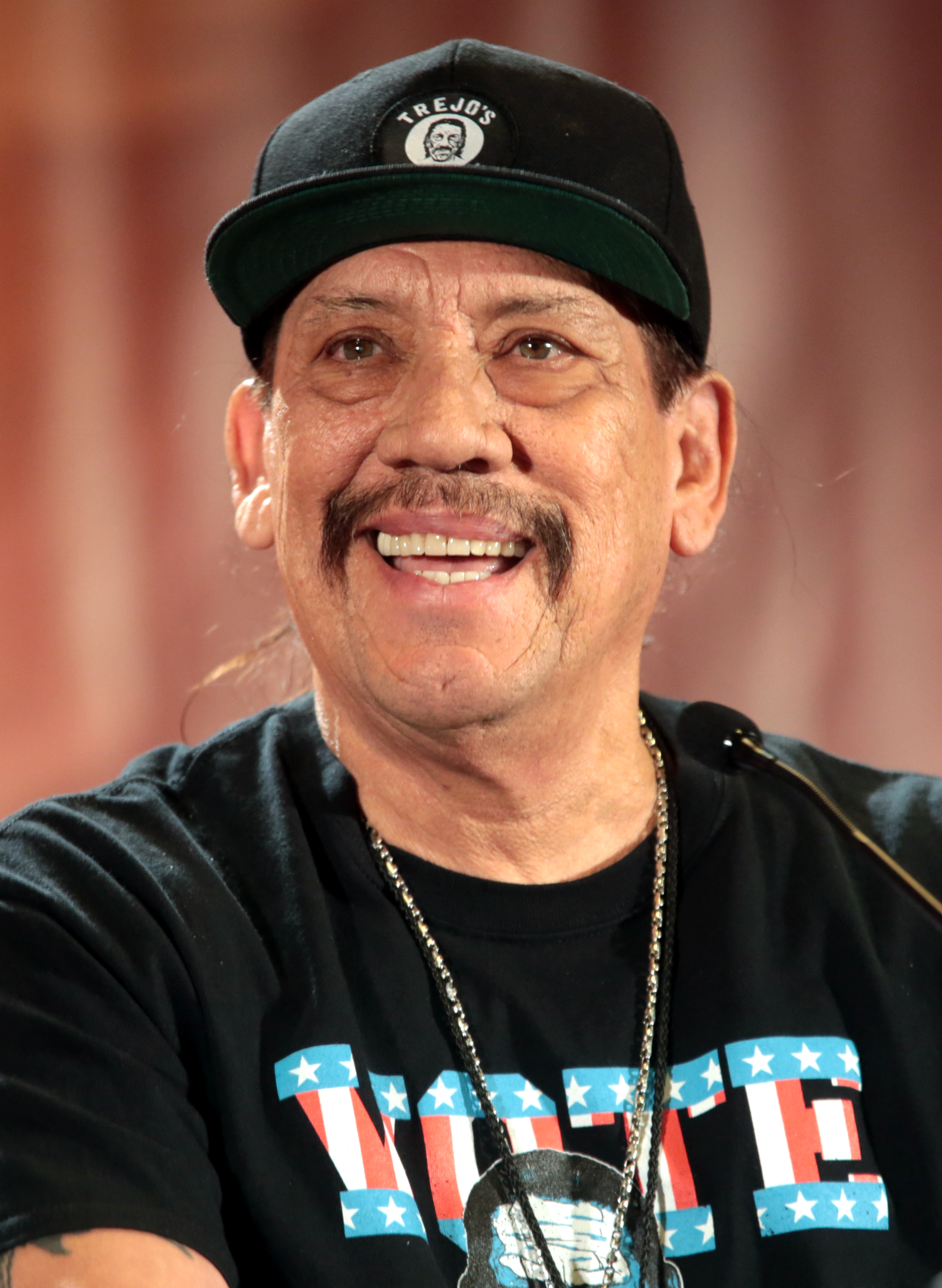
Danny Trejo

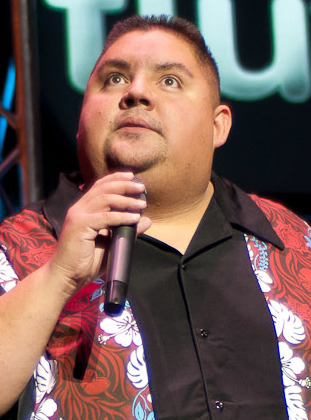
Gabriel Iglesias

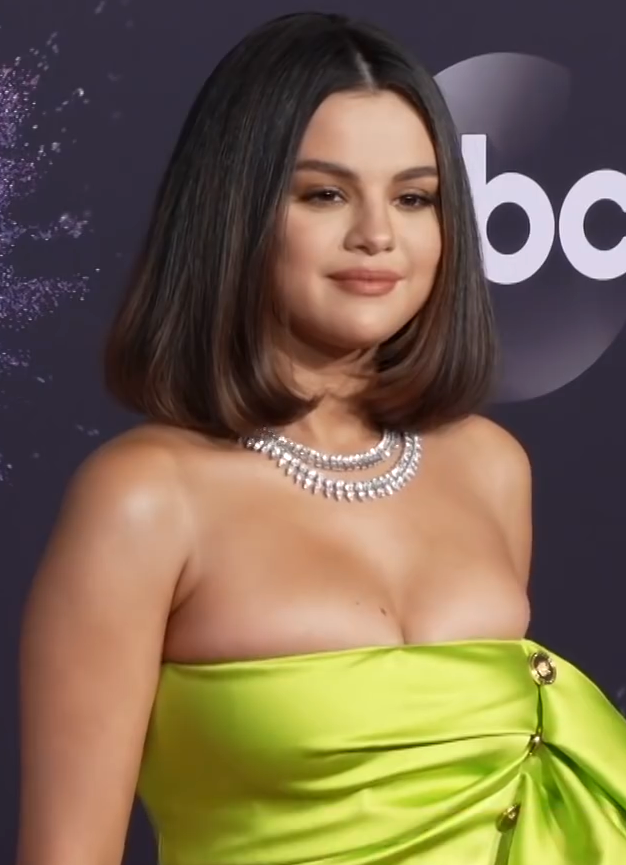
Selena Gomez

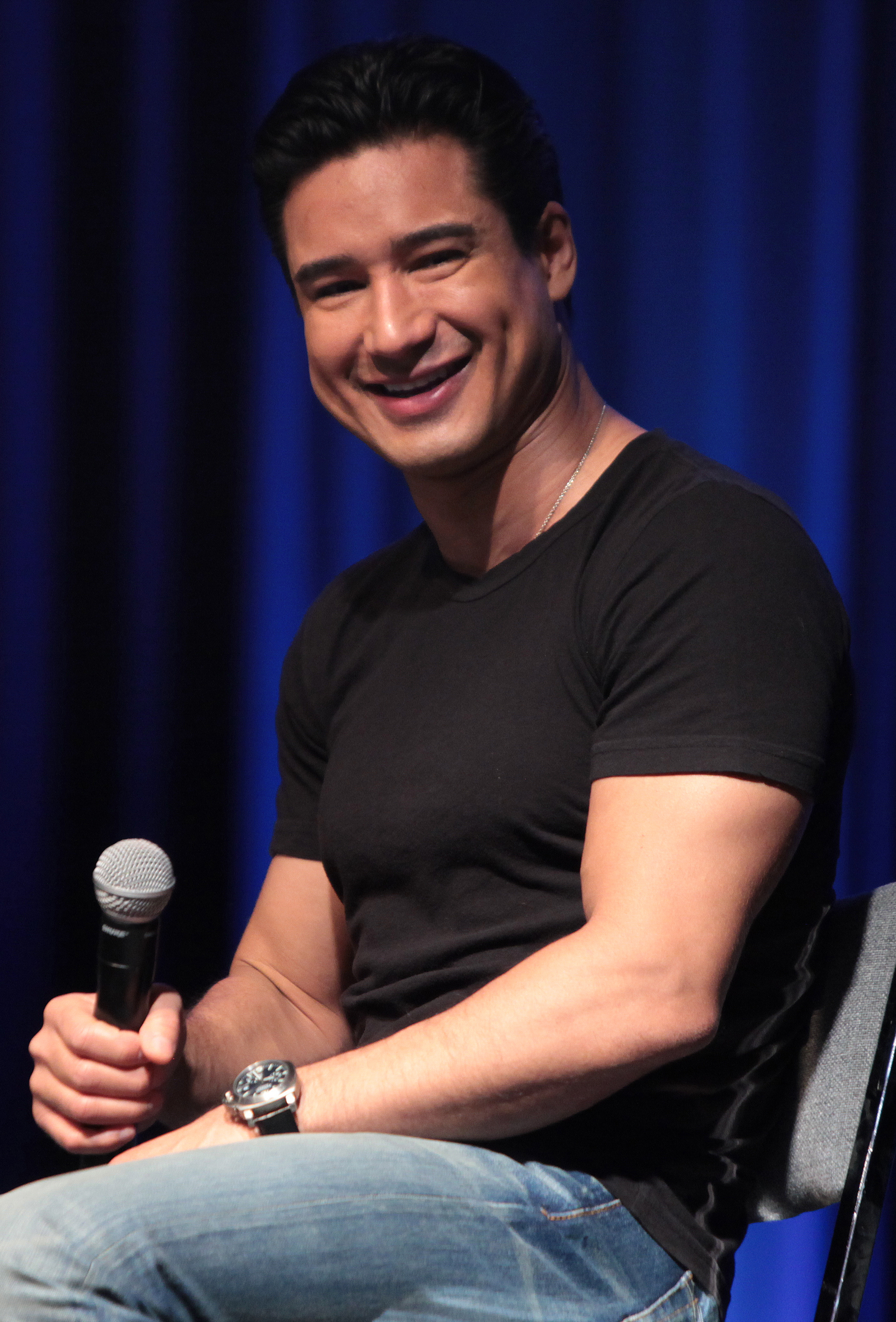
Mario Lopez

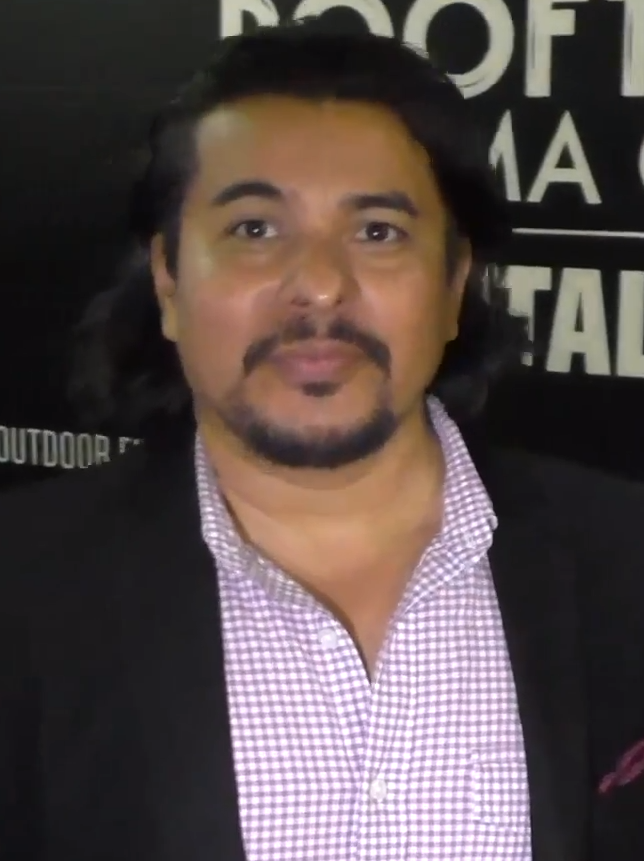
Jacob Vargas

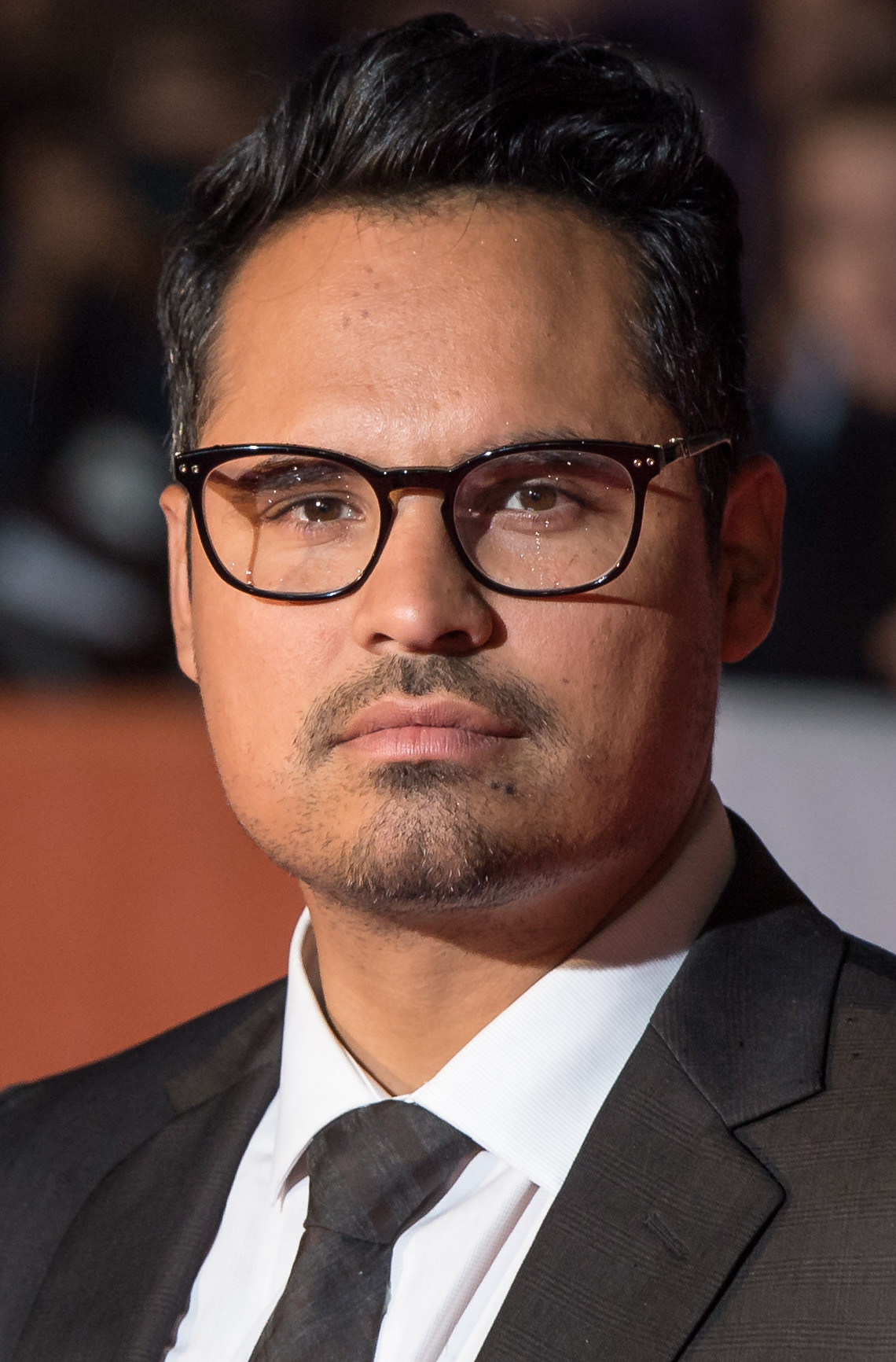
Michael Peña

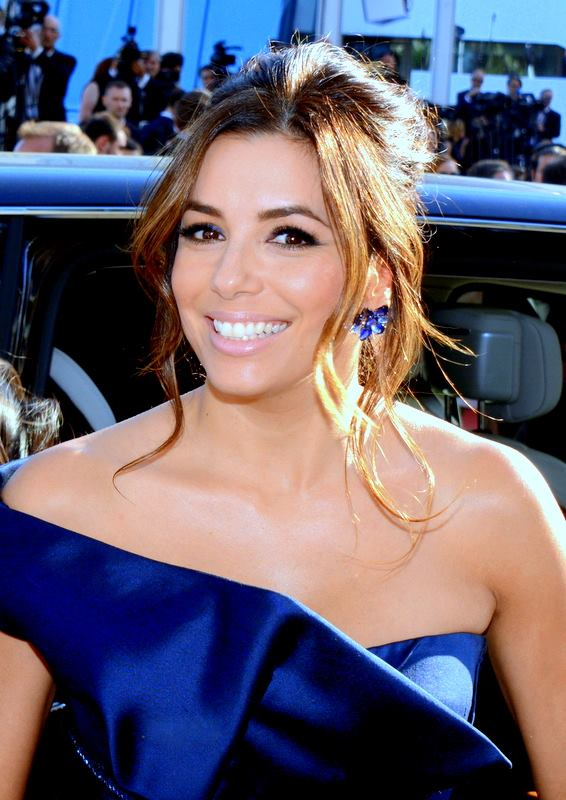
Eva Longoria

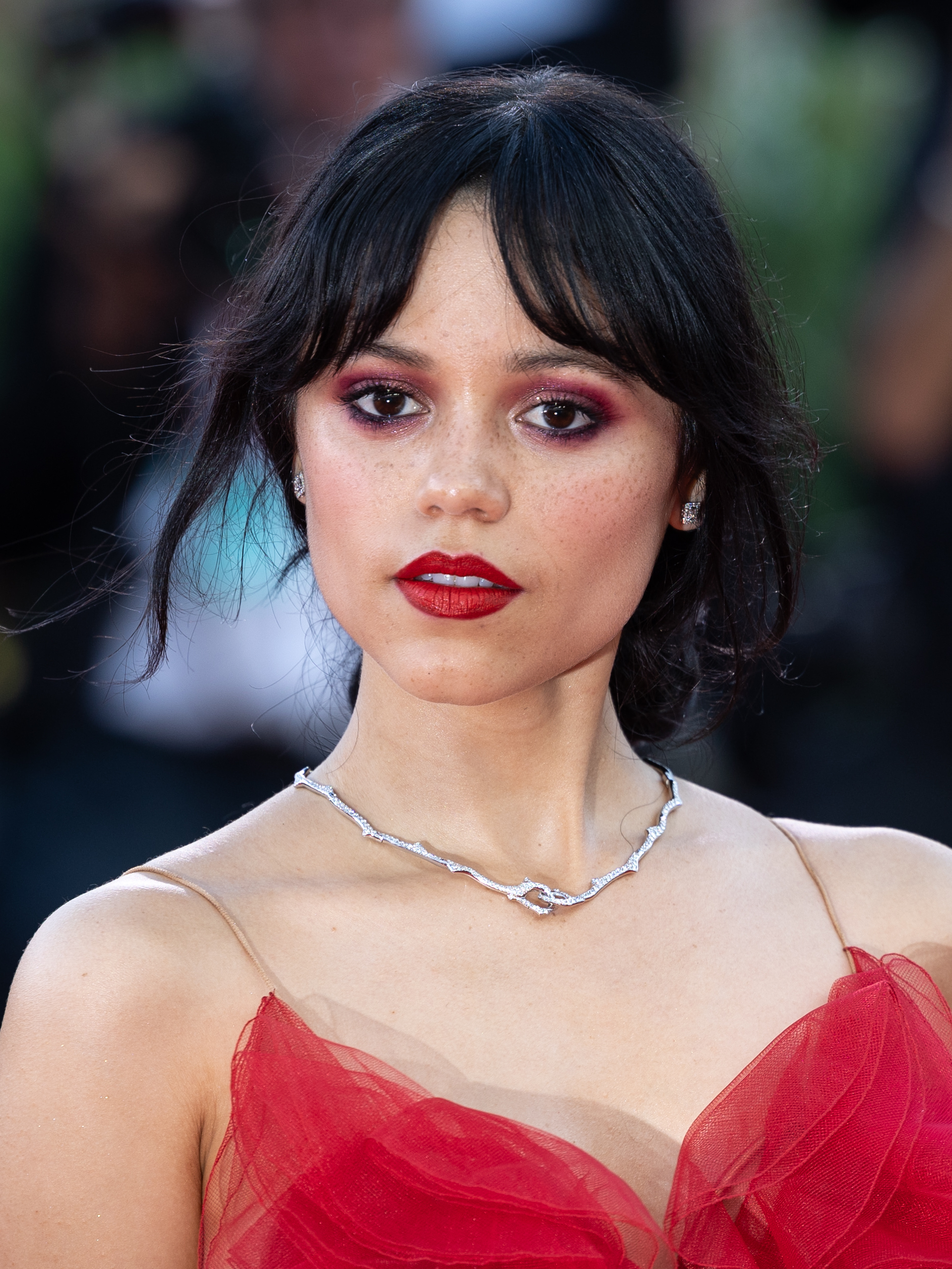
Jenna Ortega

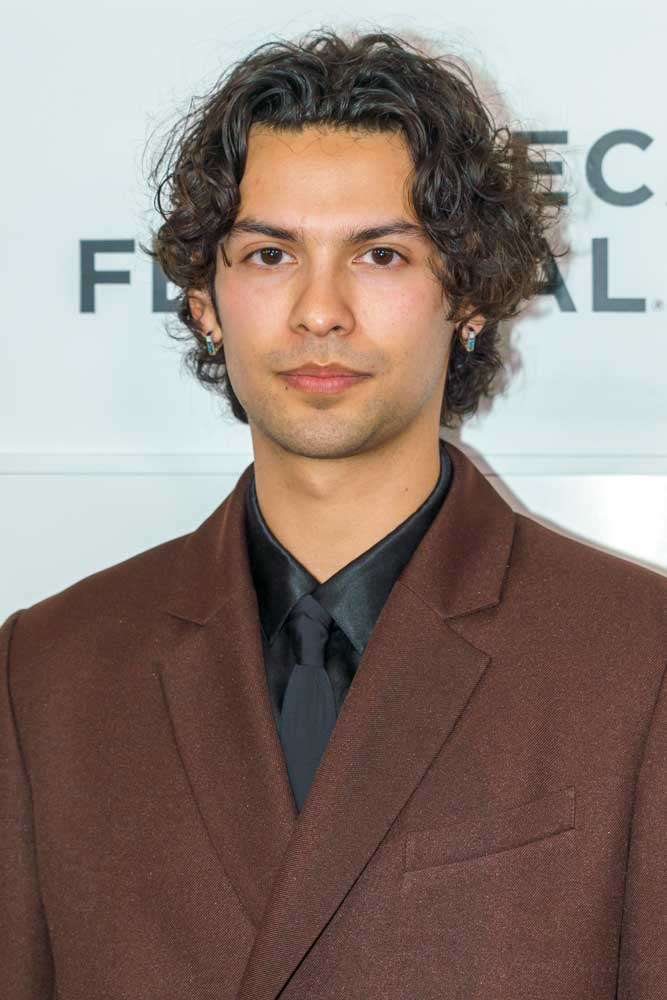
Xolo Maridueña

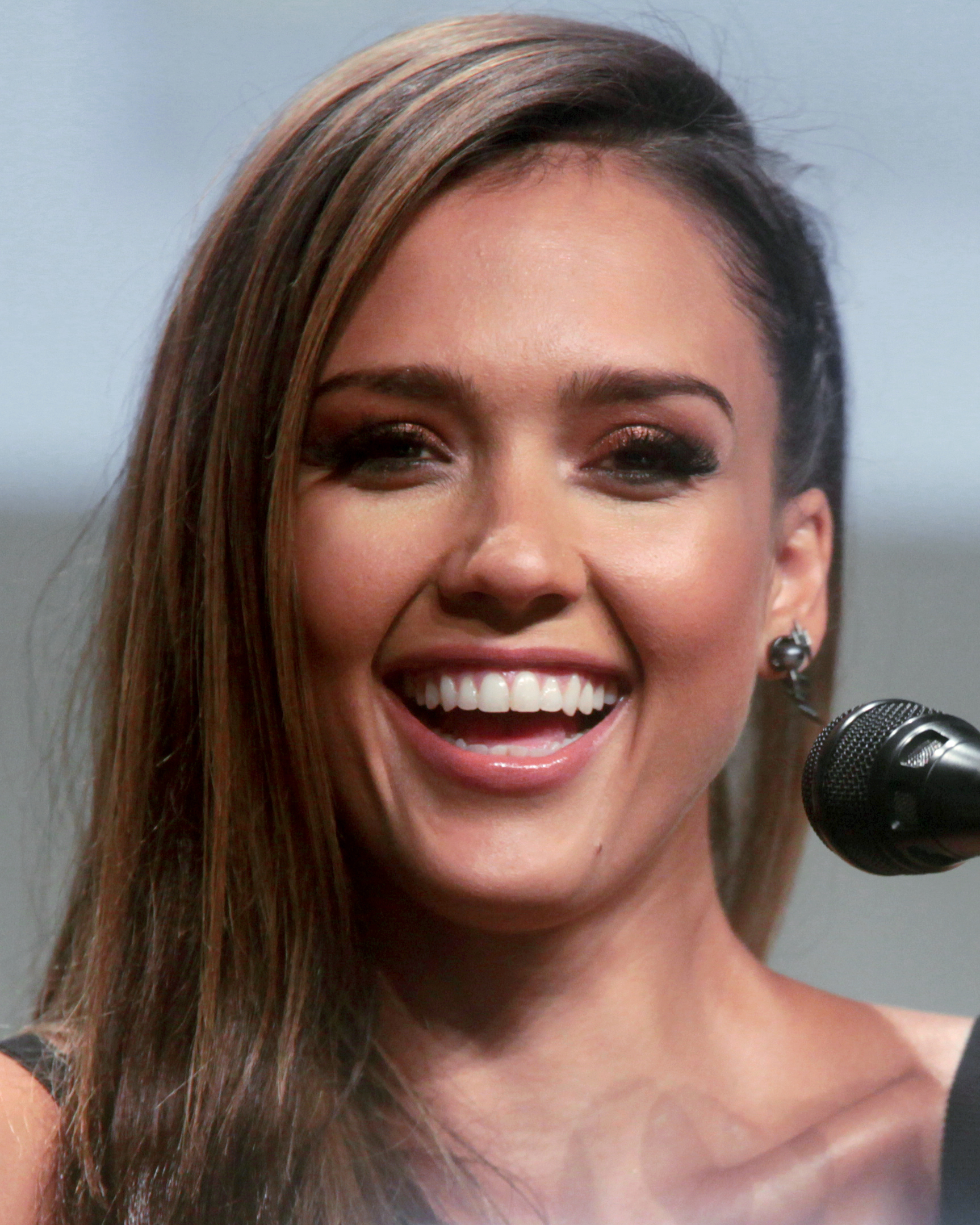
Jessica Alba

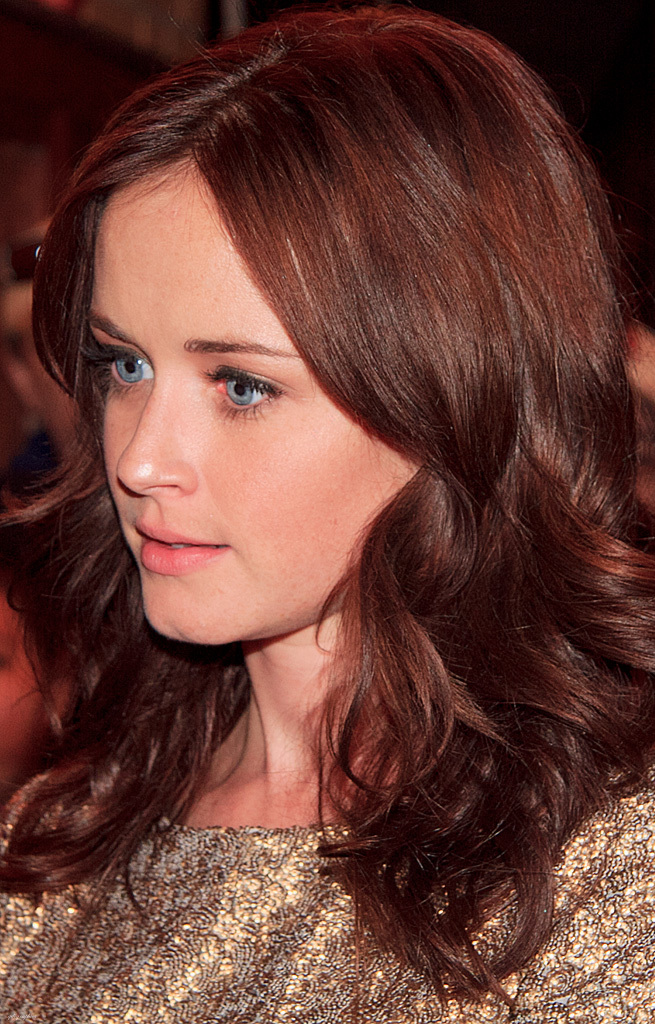
Alexis Bledel

Inde Navarrette

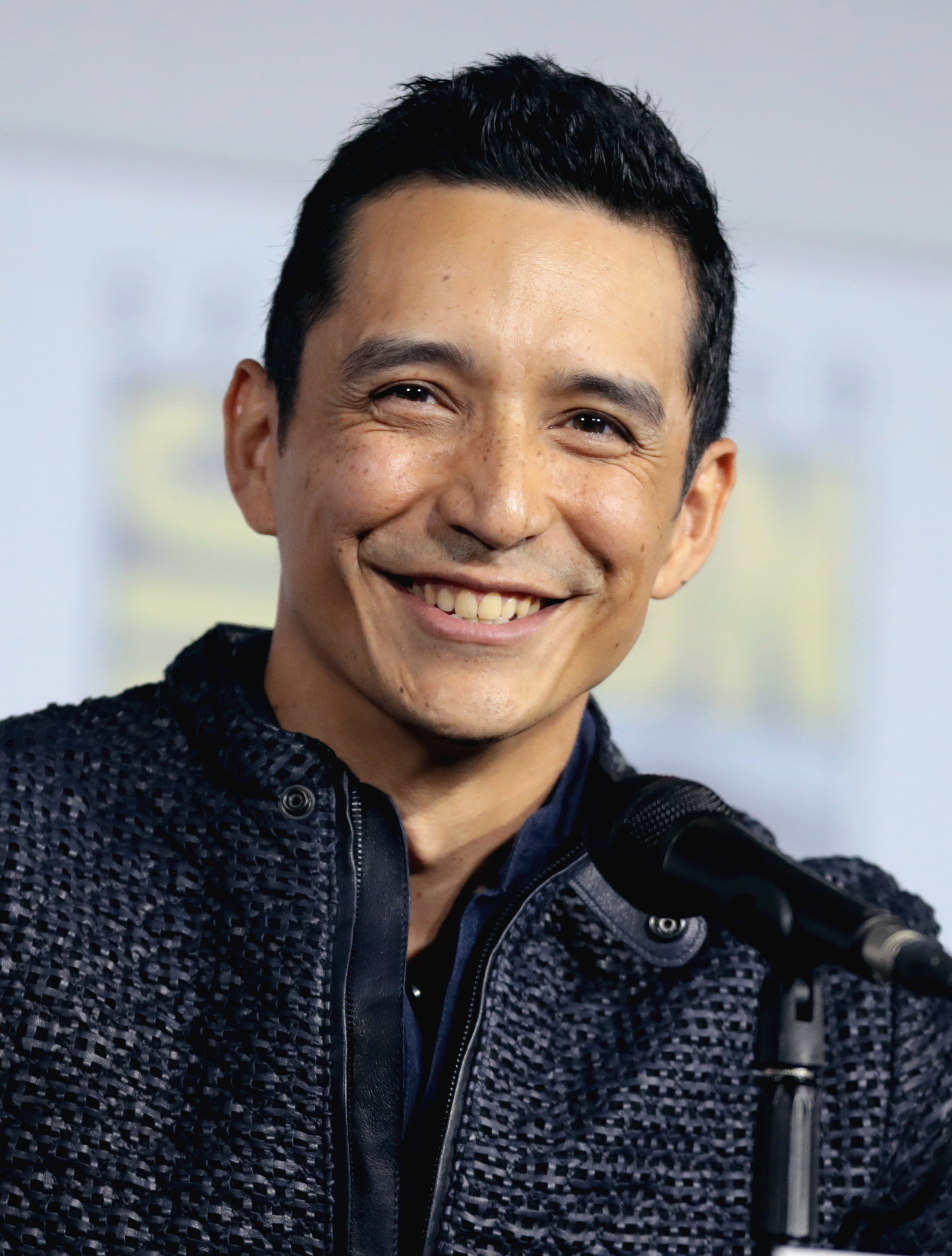
Gabriel Luna

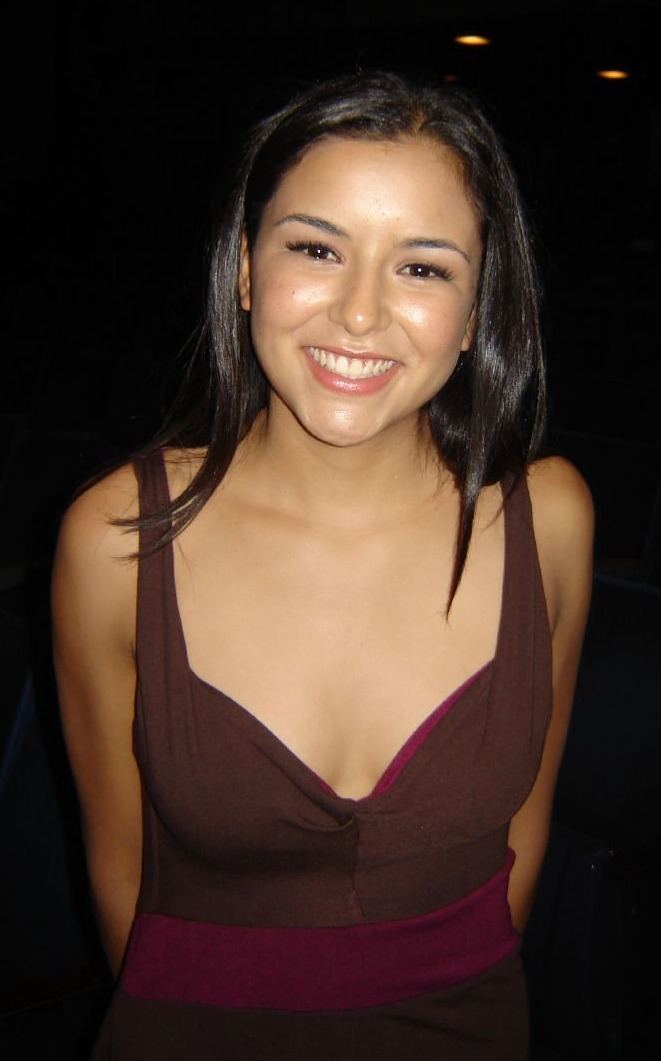
Emily Rios

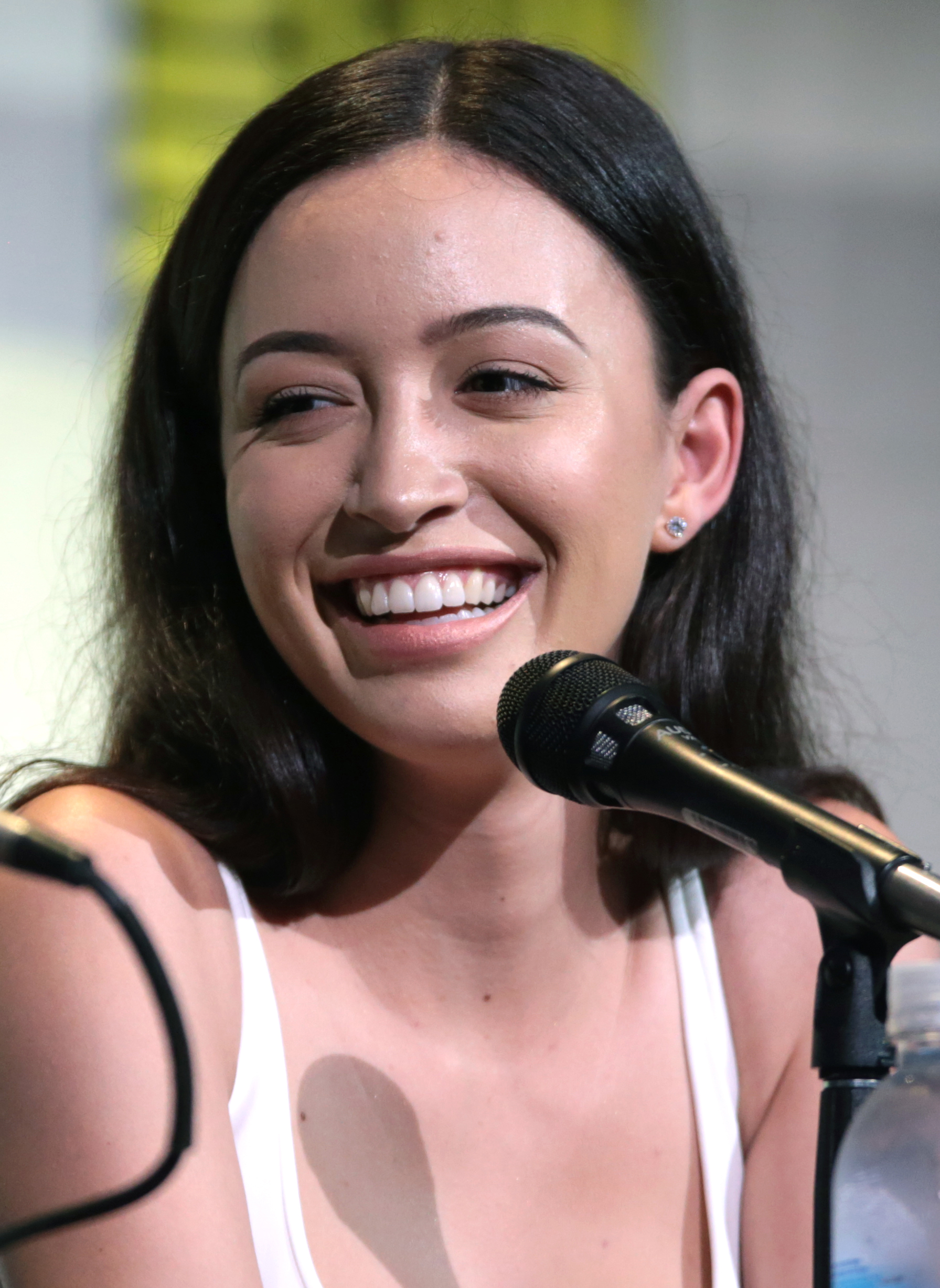
Christian Serratos

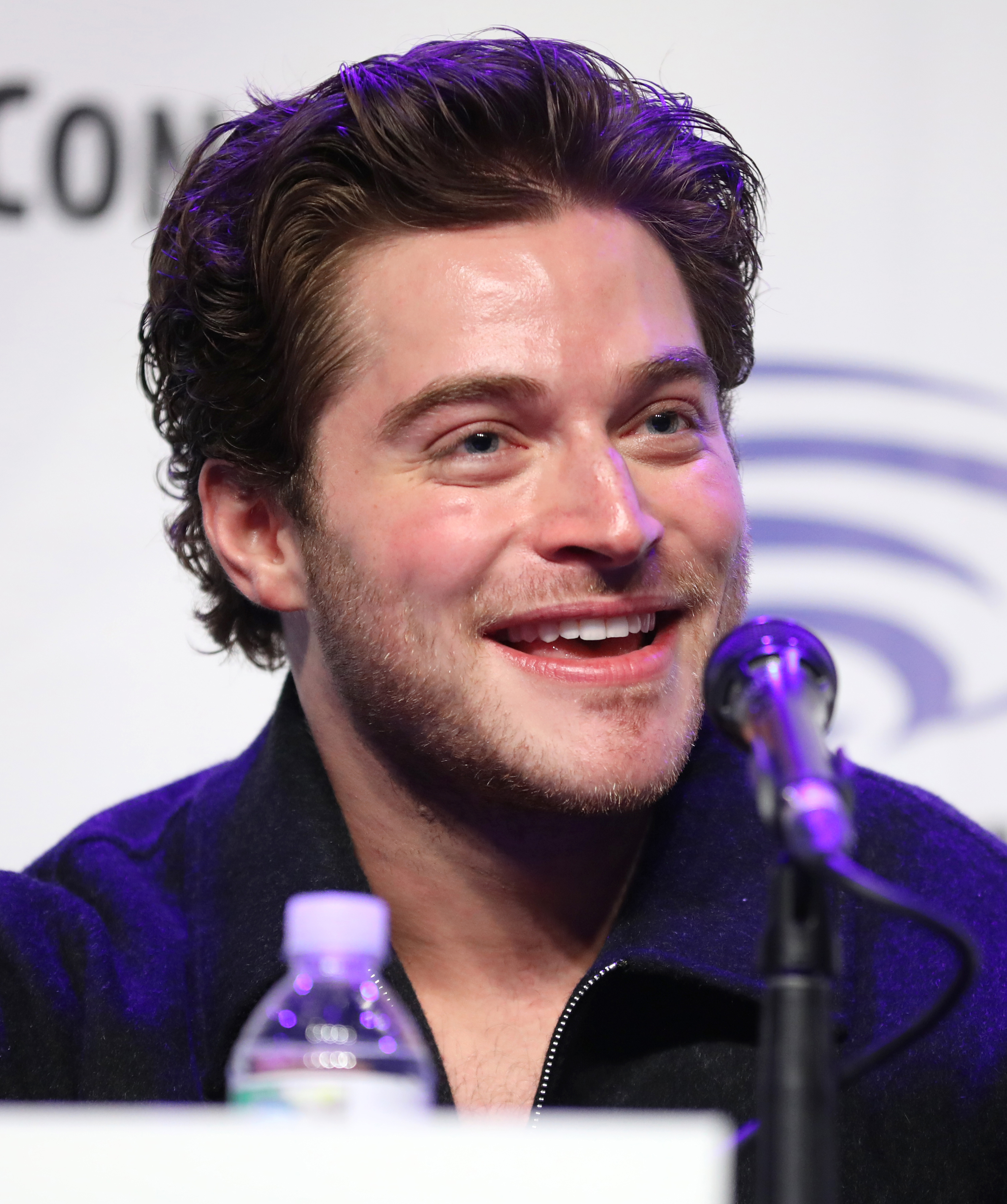
Froy Gutierrez

Eiza González

- Dolores del Río (1904–1983) – Mexican actress; with a career spanning more than 50 years, she is regarded as the first major female or male Latin American crossover star in Hollywood
- Rodolfo Acosta (1920–1974) – Mexican character actor of Western films
- Rico Alaniz (1919–2015) – character actor, active during the 1950s and 1990s
- Jessica Alba (born 1981) – Golden Globe-nominated actress (father of Mexican descent)
- Marilyn Monroe (1926–1962) – model and actress (mother of Mexican descent)
- Edward Albert (1951–2006) – Golden Globe-winning actor
- Kevin Alejandro (born 1976) – actor
- Ana Alicia (born 1956) – actress
- Francia Almendárez (born 1988) – actress
- Don Alvarado (1900–1967) – actor and director who began his career during the silent film era
- Armida (1911–1989) – actress, singer and dancer
- Joe Arquette (born 1981) – actor
- Karan Ashley – actor
- Alexis Ayala (born 1965) – actor
- Catherine Bach (born 1954) – actress (mother of Mexican descent)
- Jaylen Barron (born 1997) – actress
- Alma Beltran (1919–2007) – actress, appeared in 82 films between 1945 and 2002.
- Robert Beltran (born 1953) – actor
- Demián Bichir (born 1963) – actor
- Summer Bishil (born 1988) – actress
- Luna Blaise – actress
- Alexis Bledel (born 1981) – actress
- Daniela Bobadilla (born 1993) – actress
- Diego Boneta (born 1990) – actor
- Jesse Borrego (born 1962) – actor
- Sabrina Bryan (born 1984) – dancer, choreographer, actress and singer
- Shelbie Bruce (born 1992) – actress (mother of Mexican descent)
- Artt Butler (born 1969) – voice actor (half Mexican)
- Richard Cabral (born 1984) – Emmy-nominated actor
- Christian Camargo (born 1971) – actor
- Ralph Camargo (1912–1992) actor
- Charlie Cannon (1911–2003) singer, theater performer
- Steve Cardenas (born 1974) actor
- Leo Carrillo (1881–1961) actor, vaudevillian, political cartoonist and conservationist
- Enrique Castillo (born 1949) actor
- David Castañeda (born 1988), actor
- Movita Castaneda (1916–2015) actress
- Teresa Castillo (born 1983) actress
- Julio Cedillo (born 1970) actor
- Angélica Celaya (born 1982) actress
- Laura Cerón (born 1964) ALMA Award-winning actress
- Damian Chapa (born 1963) actor, film director and producer
- Ricardo Antonio Chavira (born 1971) actor
- Louis C.K. (born 1967) actor, comedian, Emmy Award-winning screenwriter, producer, and director (Mexican father)
- Gary Clarke (born 1933) TV actor active during the 1950s–1960s
- Steve Clemente (1885–1950) Mexican-born American actor known for his many villainous roles
- Clifton Collins Jr. (born 1970) Emmy Award-nominated actor (mother of Mexican descent)
- Mark Consuelos (born 1971) actor
- Ana Brenda Contreras (born 1986) Mexican-based television actress
- Margarita Cordova (born 1939) actress, most known for her various TV appearances during the '60s
- Raymond Cruz (born 1961) actor
- Kid Cudi (born 1984) musician and actor (father was of partial Mexican descent)
- Ethan Cutkosky (born 1999) actor
- Alana de la Garza (born 1976) actress
- Madison De La Garza (born 2001) American actress of Mexican descent (Desperate Housewives)
- Ana de la Reguera (born 1977) actress
- Gonzalo de la Torre (born 1977) singer and producer
- Kate del Castillo Mexican-born American actress (Muchachitas, Alguna vez tendremos alas, La Mentira, Ramona, Bajo la misma piel).
- Tony Dalton (born 1975) actor
- Stacey Dash (born 1967) actress
- Emilio Delgado (1940–2022) actor; best known for his role of Luis Rodriguez on Sesame Street
- Grey DeLisle (born 1973) singer-songwriter and voice actress
- Alexa Demie (born 1990) actress (mother is Mexican)
- Rosanna DeSoto (born 1950) film and television actress
- Aarón Díaz (born 1982) actor (father of Mexican descent)
- Alyssa Diaz (born 1985) actress
- Mónica Dionne American actress of Mexican descent
- Julia Louis-Dreyfus (born 1961) multiple Emmy award-winning actress (grandmother of Mexican and German-Brazilian ancestry)
- Alejandro Edda (born 1984) actor
- Ayiiia Elizarraras TV personality and model
- Jade Esteban Estrada (born 1975) actor and comedian
- Richard Esteras (born 1968) Screen Actors Guild Award-winning actor of Mexican (mother) and Puerto Rican descent
- Felipe Esparza (born 1976) actor and comedian
- Tamara Feldman (born 1980) actress
- Abel Fernandez (1930–2016) actor who played in movies 1953–2002
- Michelle Forbes (born 1965) Emmy-nominated and Saturn Award-winning actress
- Eduardo Franco
- Edward Furlong (born 1977) Saturn Award-winning actor (mother of Mexican descent)
- Vic Fuentes (born 1983) vocalist, guitarist
- Mike Fuentes (born 1984) drummer
- Edy Ganem (born 1983) actress
- Seychelle Gabriel (born 1991) singer and actress, father of part Mexican descent
- Aimee Garcia (born 1978) Screen Actors Guild-nominated actress
- Al Ernest Garcia (1887–1938) actor and casting director active between 1911 and 1938, known for his association with Charlie Chaplin
- Jeff Garcia (born 1977) comedian and Annie Award-winning voice actor
- Jesse Garcia (born 1982) ALMA Award-winning actor
- Jessica Marie Garcia (born 1987) American actress known for On My Block (TV series), Mexican father
- Michael Garza (born 2000) American actor of Mexican descent (Scary Stories to Tell in the Dark)
- John Gavin (1931–2018) actor, politician and head of the Screen Actors Guild
- William Gaxton (1893–1963) actor of film and theatre
- Hunter Gomez (born 1991) American actor
- Selena Gomez (born 1992) actress, singer, model, spokesperson, Mexican father
- Xochitl Gomez (born 2005/2006) actress
- Eiza González (born 1990) actress, model and singer
- Mandy Gonzalez (born 1978) theater and film actress
- Myrtle Gonzalez (1891–1918) silent film actress; regarded as Hollywood's first Latin and Hispanic movie star
- Nicholas Gonzalez (born 1976) actor
- Pedro Gonzalez-Gonzalez (1925–2006) character actor
- Michele Greene (born 1962) Emmy-nominated actress, best known for the role of Abigail Perkins on the series L.A.
- Lita Grey (1908–1995) silent film actress
- Jackie Guerra (born 1965) actress
- Noel Gugliemi (born 1970) actor
- Elizabeth Gutiérrez (born 1979) actress
- Froy Gutierrez (born 1998) actor
- Ryan Guzman (born 1987) actor, father of Mexican descent
- Nikki Hahn (born 2002) actress
- Gabriella Hall (born 1966) actress and model
- Laura Harring (born 1964) actress and Miss USA (1985)
- Salma Hayek (born 1966) Oscar, Emmy, and Golden Globe-nominated actress, TV-film director and producer
- Callie Hernandez (born 1995) actress, singer
- Jay Hernandez (born 1978) actor
- Kristin Herrera (born 1989) actress
- Gabriel Iglesias (born 1976) actor and comedian
- Osvaldo de León (born 1984) Telenovelas actor
- Ana Brenda Contreras (born 1986) TV actress
- Ryan Guzman (born 1987) TV actor
- Mónica Dionne (born 1967) film and TV actress
- David Iacono (born 2002) actor
- Michael Irby (born 1972) actor
- Rebeca Iturbide (1924–2003) actress during the Mexican Age of Golden cinema
- Shar Jackson (born 1976) actress
- Anjelah Johnson (born 1982) actress, comedian, and former NFL cheerleader
- Susan Kohner (born 1936) Golden Globe-winning and Oscar-nominated actress, mother was Lupita Tovar, Mexican actress
- Apollonia Kotero (born 1959) actress, singer and model
- Samuel Larsen (born 1991) actor and singer
- Logan Lerman (born 1992) actor; (Mexican-born paternal grandmother of Russian Jewish descent)
- George J. Lewis (1903–1995) Mexican-born American actor (Zorro (1957 TV series))
- Sebastián Ligarde (born 1954) telenovela actor
- Iyari Limón (born 1976) actress
- Natalia Livingston (born 1976) Emmy Award-winning actress
- Eva Longoria (born 1975) Golden Globe-nominated and Screen Actors Guild-winning actress and model
- George Lopez (born 1961) actor and comedian
- Mario López (born 1973) actor and host
- Seidy López actress and director
- Linda Loredo (1907–1931) actress
- Gabriel Luna (born 1982) actor, best known for his role as Robbie Reyes / Ghost Rider on the series Marvel's Agents of S.H.I.E.L.D.
- Julio Macias (born 1990) actor from On My Block
- Al Madrigal (born 1971) actor and comedian
- Angélica María (born 1944) actress and life-time Grammy Award-winning singer-songwriter. She was one of the main movie and TV attractions in Mexico during the 60s and 70s and the no. 1 record seller in the country during the same period
- Vanessa Marcil (born 1968) Emmy-winning actress
- Xolo Maridueña (born 2001) actor
- Constance Marie (born 1965) actress
- Cheech Marin (born 1946) actor and comedian
- Ada Maris (born 1957) actress
- Chrispin Martin (1893–1953) actor
- A Martinez (born 1948) Emmy Award-winning actor
- Joaquín Martínez (1930–2012) actor, appeared in many Western films
- Kimberly McCullough (born 1978) actress, best known for her role as Robin Scorpio on the soap opera General Hospital
- Alex Meneses (born 1965) actress and model
- Alex Meraz (born 1985) actor
- Yvette Mimieux (1942–2022) actress
- Lin-Manuel Miranda (born 1980) American actor, composer, lyricist, singer, rapper, actor, producer, and playwright, known by his roles in Broadway musicals; of mostly Puerto Rican descent, and is one-quarter Mexican
- Ricardo Montalbán (1920–2009) Emmy and Screen Actors Guild award-winning actor
- Carlos Montalbán (1903–1991) actor
- Manny Montana (born 1983) American actor of Mexican descent
- Belita Moreno (born 1949) actress
- Rene L. Moreno (born 1969) actor
- Lindsey Morgan (born 1990) Emmy-nominated actress
- Bethany Mota (born 1995) social media personality
- Inde Navarrette (born 2001) actress (father of Mexican descent)
- Marisol Nichols (born 1973) actress
- Eva Noblezada (born 1996) actress and singer, two-time Tony Award nominee and Grammy winner
- Ramón Novarro (1899–1968) actor, one of the top box office attractions of the 1920s and early 1930s
- Paola Núñez (born 1978) actress
- Lupita Nyong'o (born 1983) actress, born in Mexico City to Kenyan parents
- Raymond Ochoa (born 2001) actor
- Edward James Olmos (born 1947) Golden Globe and Emmy-winning actor and director
- Lupe Ontiveros (1942–2012) Emmy-nominated actress
- Hayley Orrantia (born 1994) actress, singer-songwriter; grandfather is of Mexican descent and she identifies as Latina
- Jenna Ortega (born 2002) actress
- Joy Page (1924–2008) actress
- Sara Paxton (born 1988) actress and singer, mother is Mexican, of Mexican-Jewish descent
- Michael Peña (born 1976) actor
- Walter Perez (born 1982) actor
- Tony Perry (born 1986) guitarist
- Daniella Pineda (born 1987) actress
- Tyler Posey (born 1991) actor (mother of Mexican descent)
- Mishel Prada (born 1989) actress
- Jaime Preciado (born 1986) bassist
- Anthony Quinn (1915–2001) two-time Oscar-winning actor
- Cierra Ramirez (born 1995) actress and model
- Efren Ramirez (born 1973) actor
- Danny Ramirez (born 1997) American actor of Colombian and Mexican descent
- Marisa Ramirez (born 1977) actress
- Sara Ramirez (born 1975) Tony Award-winning actress and singer
- Raylene (born 1977) pornographic actress
- Alex Reymundo comedian and actor
- Nicole Richie (born 1981) actress of partial Mexican descent
- Mona Rico (1907–1994) actress
- Lauren Ridloff (born 1978) Tony Award-nominated actress
- Emily Rios (born 1989) actress and model
- Lalo Rios (1927–1973) actor, active during the 1950s and 1960s
- James Roday (born 1976) actor, father of Mexican descent
- Lee Rodriguez actress (father is Mexican)
- Rico Rodriguez (born 1998) actor
- Paul Rodriguez (born 1955) comedian and actor
- Patty Rodriguez radio host, entrepreneur, and children's book author
- Valente Rodriguez (born 1961) actor
- Gilbert Roland (1905–1994) two-time Golden Globe-nominated actor
- Fernanda Romero (born 1983) actress
- Tina Romero (born 1949) Mexico-based actress
- Luis van Rooten (1906–1973) Mexican-born American actor
- Gabrielle Ruiz (born 1989) film and theater actress
- Teresa Ruiz (born 1988) actress, won multiple international awards
- Andy Russell (1919–1992) born Andrés Rábago in Boyle Heights, California
- Claudia Salinas (born 1981) actress and model
- Johnny A. Sanchez (born 1982) actor and comedian
- Lauren Sánchez (born 1969) news anchor, entertainment and media personality
- Ref Sanchez (1917–1986) actor and photographer
- Paul Sand (born 1935) Tony Award-winning actor
- Miguel Sandoval (born 1951) film and television actor
- Michael Saucedo (born 1970) actor
- Christian Serratos (born 1990) actress, model and singer, of part Mexican descent
- Vinessa Shaw (born 1976) actress
- Stephanie Sigman (born 1987) actress
- Zuleyka Silver (born 1991) actress, model
- Alicia Sixtos (born 1988) actress
- Karla Souza (born 1985) film and television actress
- David Spielberg (1939–2016) film and television actor; mother was Mexican American
- Scout Taylor-Compton (born 1989) actress and singer (mother of Mexican descent)
- Julia Goldani Telles (born 1995) actress
- Tessa Thompson (born 1983) actress
- Raquel Torres (1915–1987) actress, active during the 1920s to 1930s
- Renee Torres (1911–1998) Mexican American actress, sister of Raquel Torres
- Emeraude Toubia (born 1989) actress, model
- Elena Tovar Daytime Emmy Award-nominated actress
- Lupita Tovar (1910–2016) actress
- Danny Trejo (born 1944) actor
- Michael Trevino (born 1985) actor
- Alanna Ubach (born 1975) actress
- Natividad Vacío (1912–1996) actor
- Erik Valdez (born 1979) actor
- Jacob Vargas (born 1971) actor
- James Vasquez (born 1972) actor and director to a Mexican father
- Ray Vasquez (1924–2019) singer, musician, and actor
- Randy Vasquez (born 1961) actor and director; brother of James Vasquez
- Lupe Vélez (1908–1944) one of the first successful Latin American actresses in the United States, began her career in the silent film era
- Vanessa Villela (born 1978) actress
- Melissa Villaseñor (born 1987) actress
- Nena von Schlebrügge (born 1941) actress
- Pee Wee (entertainer) (born 1988) actor and singer
- Victoria Wyndham (born 1945) two-time Emmy-nominated actress
- Eduardo Xol (born 1966) actor
- Carmen Zapata (1927–2014) actress, appeared in over 100 films and TV series
- Austin Zajur (born 1995) actor

=== Directors and filmmakers ===
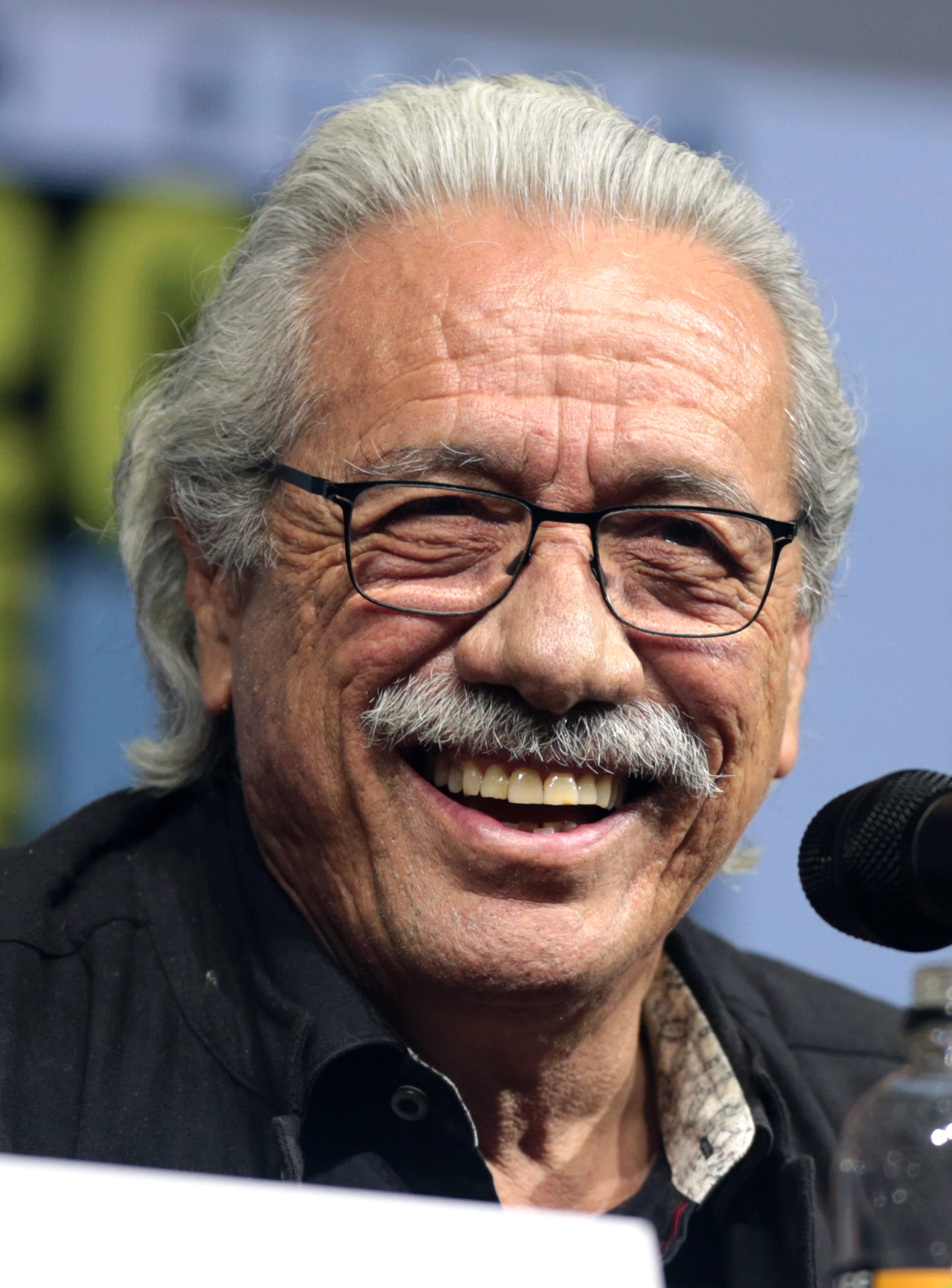
Edward James Olmos

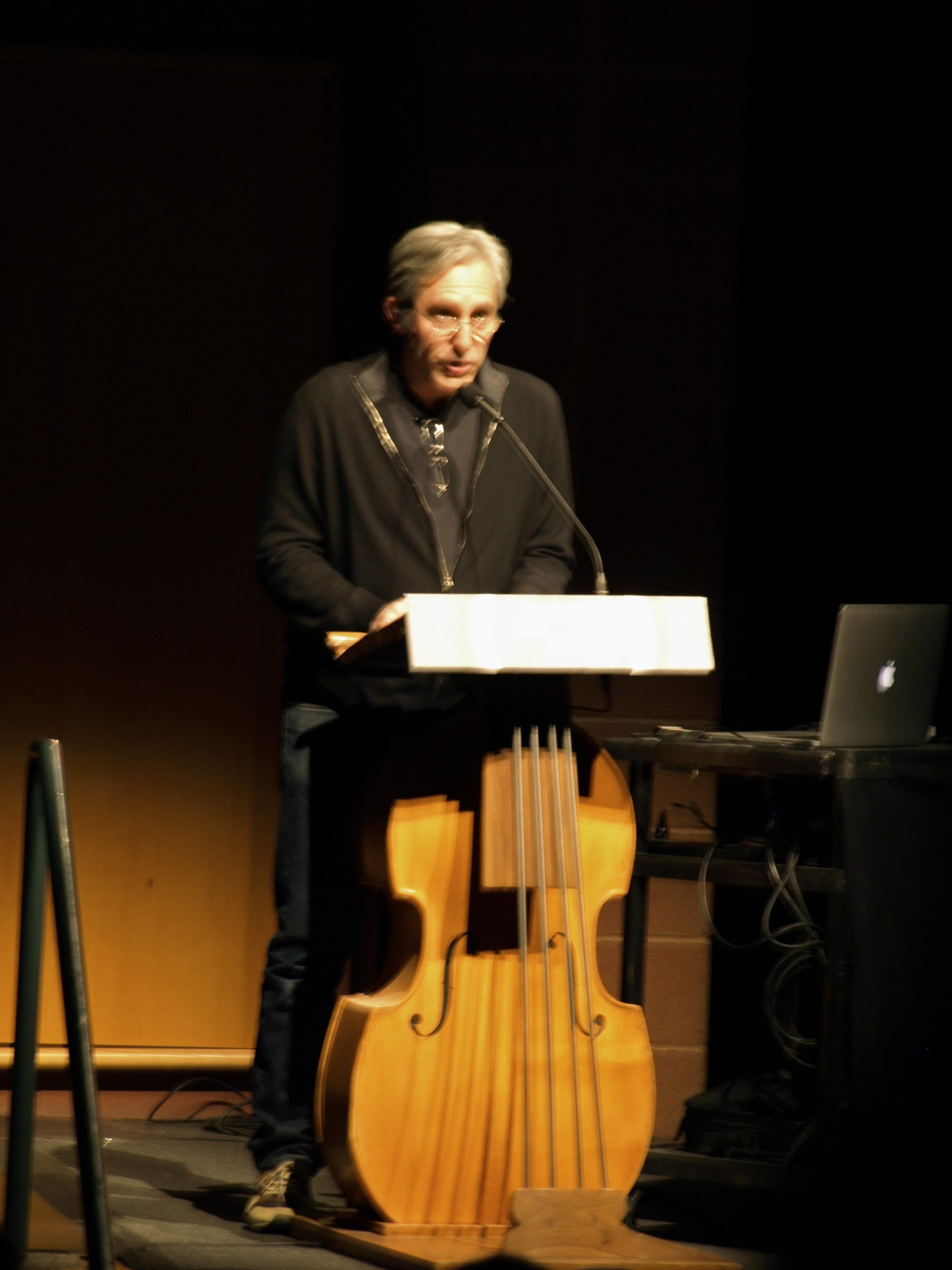
Paul Weitz

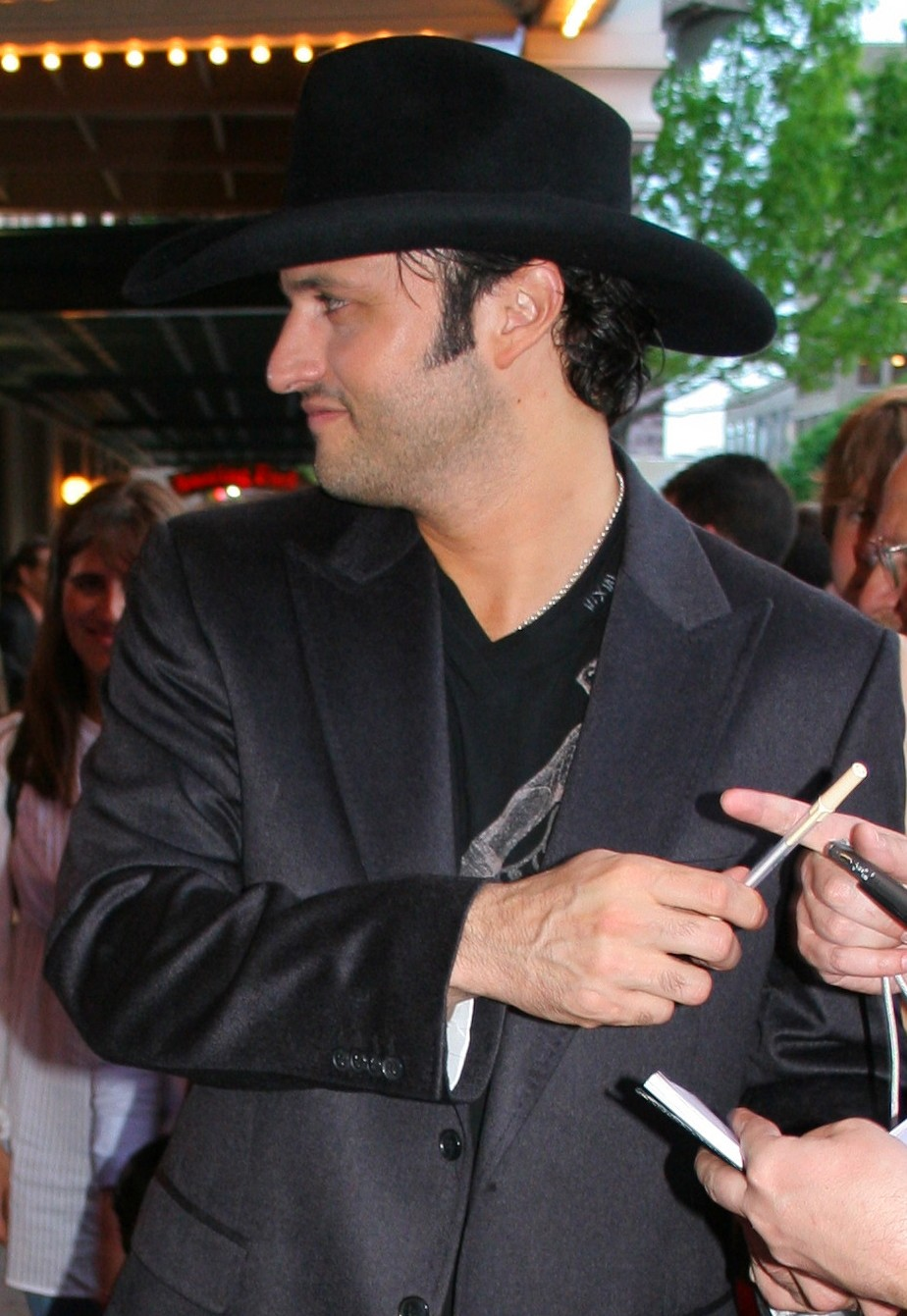
Robert Rodriguez

Chris Weitz

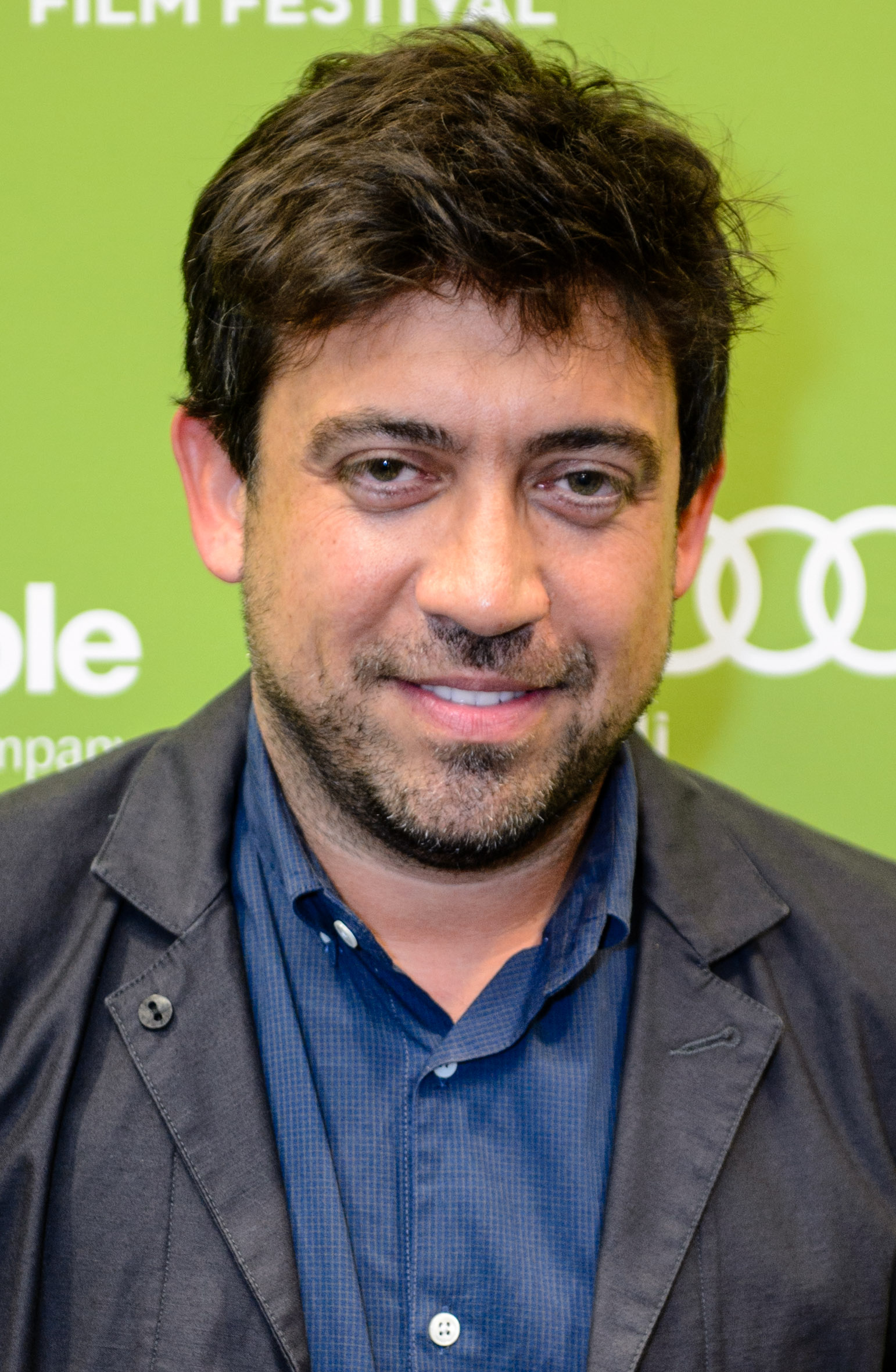
Alfonso Gomez-Rejon

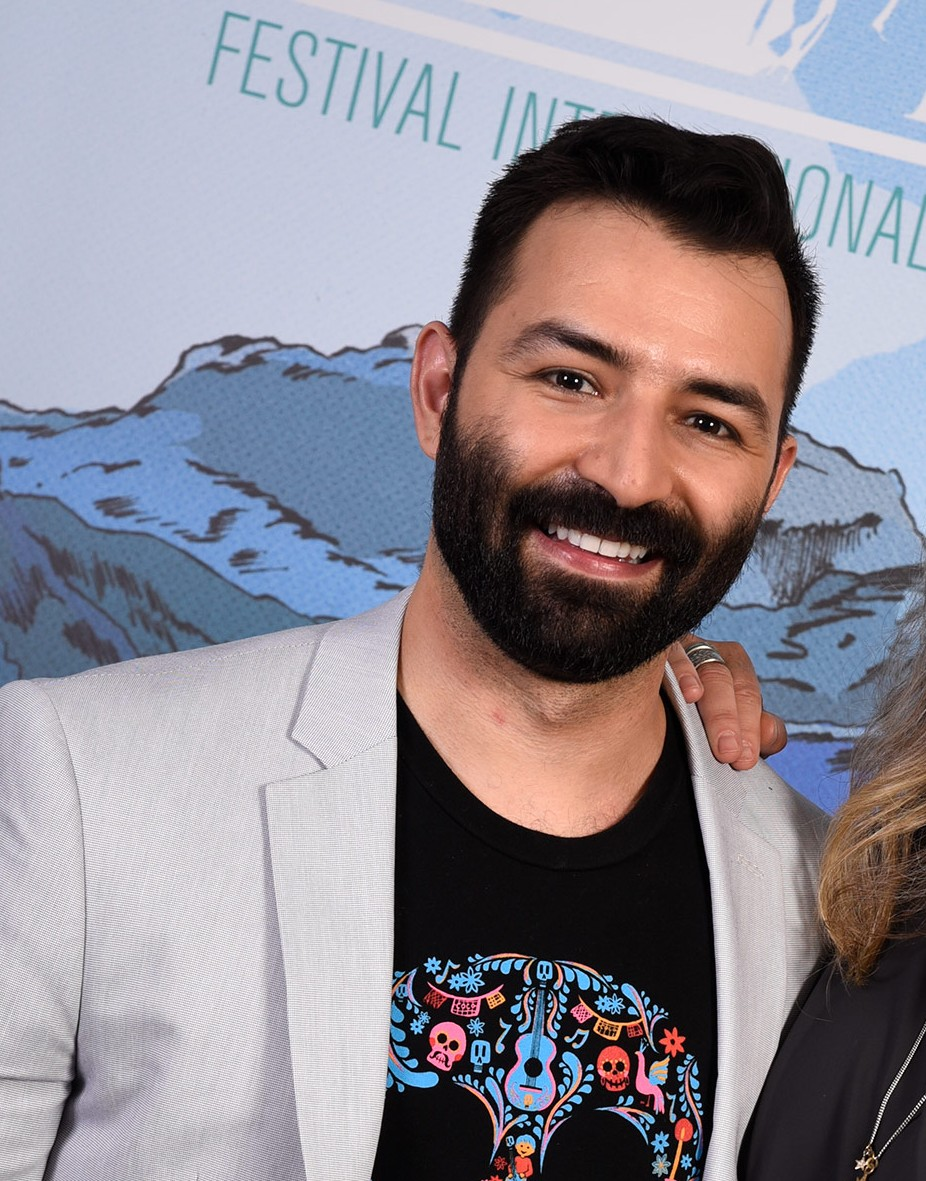
Adrian Molina

- Elisa Marina Alvarado – director
- Guillermo del Toro (born 1964) – film director
- Félix Enríquez Alcalá (born 1951) – television and film director
- Natalia Almada (born 1974) – documentary filmmaker
- Robert Alvarez (born 1948) – animator, television director, and writer
- John A. Alonzo (1934–2001) – influential cinematographer, Academy Award nominee and Emmy Award winner
- Michael Arias (born 1968) – anime filmmaker based in Japan
- Eva Aridjis (born 1974) – film director, screenwriter, TV writer
- Roberto Benabib (born 1959) – television writer, producer, and film director, Emmy Award nominee
- J. Robert Bren (1903–1981) – screenwriter and producers, wrote 30 films between the '30s and '50s
- Edward Carrere (1906–1084) – art director, Academy Award winner and two-time nominee
- Natalie Chaidez (born 1950) – writer and producer, Emmy Award nominee
- Fernanda Coppel – screenwriter and playwright
- Julio Hernández Cordón (born 1975) – director and screenwriter
- Terri Doty (born 1984) – animation voice actress, voice director, and writer
- Mike Elizalde (born 1960) – special makeup effects artist, Academy Award nominee
- Moctezuma Esparza (born 1949) – producer, Academy Award and Emmy Award nominee
- Carlos López Estrada (born 1988) – music video, commercial, and film director
- Hampton Fancher (born 1938) – producer and screenwriter
- William A. Fraker (1923–2010) – cinematographer, director, and producer, six-time Academy Award nominee
- Nick Gomez (born 1963) – American film director
- Alfonso Gomez-Rejon (born 1972) – film and television director, two-time Emmy Award nominee
- Neal Jimenez (born 1960) – screenwriter and film director
- Emile Kuri (1907–2000) – set decorator, won two Academy Awards and was nominated for six more in the category Best Art Direction
- William Douglas Lansford (1922–2013) – screenwriter, film producer, and author
- Paul Lerpae (1900–1989) – special effects artist, Academy Award nominee
- Jenée LaMarque (born 1980) – writer and director
- Bill Melendez (1916–2008) – animator, director, and producer, eight-time Emmy Award winner and Academy Award nominee
- Steven C. Melendez (born 1945) – animator, director, and producer, Emmy Award winner (son of Bill Melendez)
- Linda Mendoza (born 1950) – television and film director
- Lindsay Mendez (born 1983) – Tony Award-winning actress
- Adrian Molina (born 1985) – screenwriter, storyboard artist, and animation director, Emmy Award nominee
- Sylvia Morales (born 1943) – director, writer, and producer, Emmy Award nominee
- Gregory Nava (born 1949) – director, producer and screenwriter, Academy Award and Emmy Award nominee
- Tony Olmos – screenwriter, filmmaker and musician
- Edward James Olmos (born 1947) – director and actor, Emmy and Golden Globe winner
- Roberto Orci (born 1973) – screenwriter and producer
- Manuel Perez (animator) (1914–1981) – animator and animation director
- Polish brothers – screenwriters and producers
- Lourdes Portillo (1943–2024) – Academy Award-nominated filmmaker
- Georgina Garcia Riedel – filmmaker and scriptwriter
- Jonas Rivera (born 1971) – producer with Pixar films, Academy Award winner
- Robert Rodríguez (born 1968) – director, producer and screenwriter
- Phil Roman (born 1930) – animation director, founder of Film Roman animation studio, six-time Emmy Award winner
- Bernardo Ruiz – documentary filmmaker
- Craig Saavedra (born 1963) – producer and director, two-time Tony Award nominee
- Victor Salva (born 1958) – filmmaker
- Jesús Salvador Treviño (born 1946) – television director, three-time Emmy Award nominee
- Jose Luis Valenzuela – theater and film director
- Jeff Valdez (born 1956) – producer, writer, and studio executive
- Luis Valdez (born 1940) – playwright and director
- Chris Weitz (born 1969) – writer, producer, director; grandmother was Mexican actress Lupita Tovar
- Paul Weitz (born 1965) – writer, producer, director; grandmother was Mexican actress Lupita Tovar
- Rudy Zamora (1910–1989) – animator and animation director, Emmy Award nominee
- Alfonso Cuarón (born 1961) – film director, producer, editor, and screenwriter

=== Models ===
- Arianny Celeste – MMA ring girl, model, TV host
- Nikita Dragun – YouTuber, make-up artist, and model
- Ayiiia Elizarraras – TV personality and model
- Wendolly Esparza – beauty pageant titleholder
- Yoanna House – model, fashion model, TV host and America's Next Top Model winner (Cycle 2)
- Erika Medina – model
- Christian Monzon – model and actor
- Naima Mora – model, fashion model, America's Next Top Model winner (cycle 4)
- Carter Oosterhouse – Nautica and HGTV's Carter Can
- Nia Sanchez – model, Miss USA 2014
- Mia St. John – professional boxer, model, businesswoman and tae kwon do champion
- Christian Serratos – actress, model and singer
- Frida Sofía – musician, TV host, model, singer and media personality
- Ylianna Guerra – model, beauty pageant titleholder

=== Musicians, singers and music groups ===
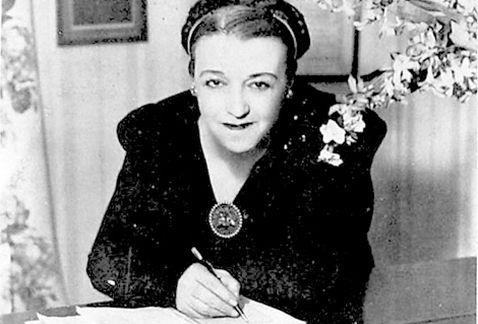
María Grever was a prolific Mexican-born and U.S.-based composer who achieved crossover success.

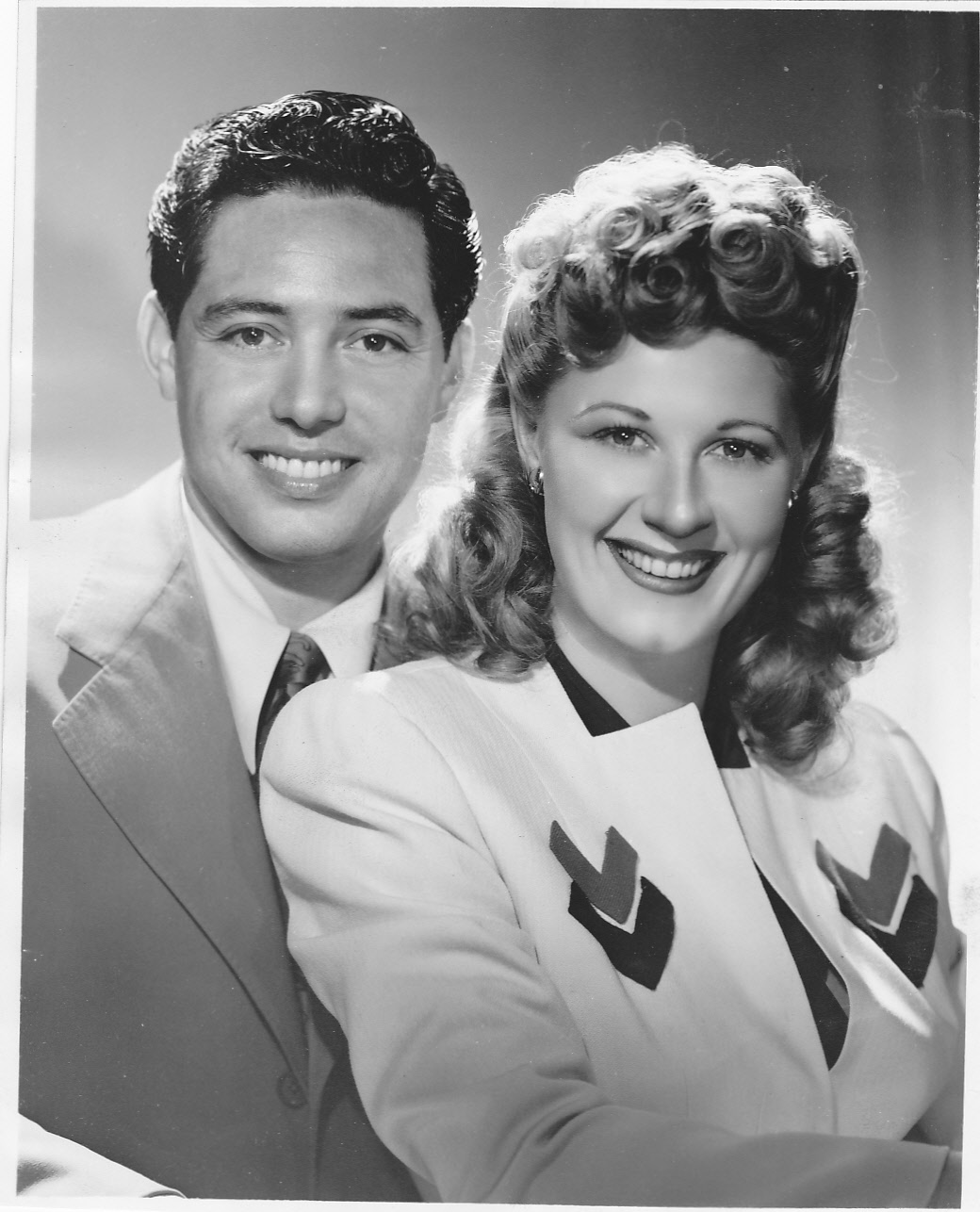
Andy Russell (born Andrés Rábago) is recognized as the first Latino crossover singer in the U.S.

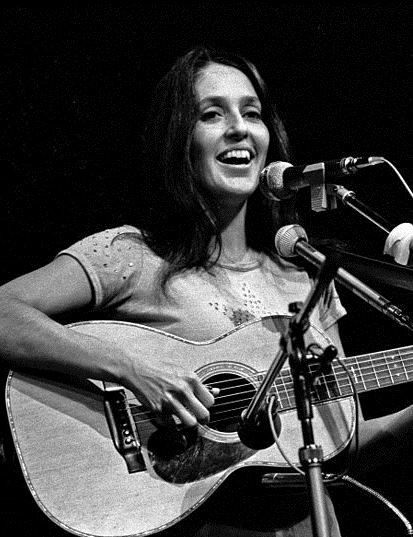
Joan Baez

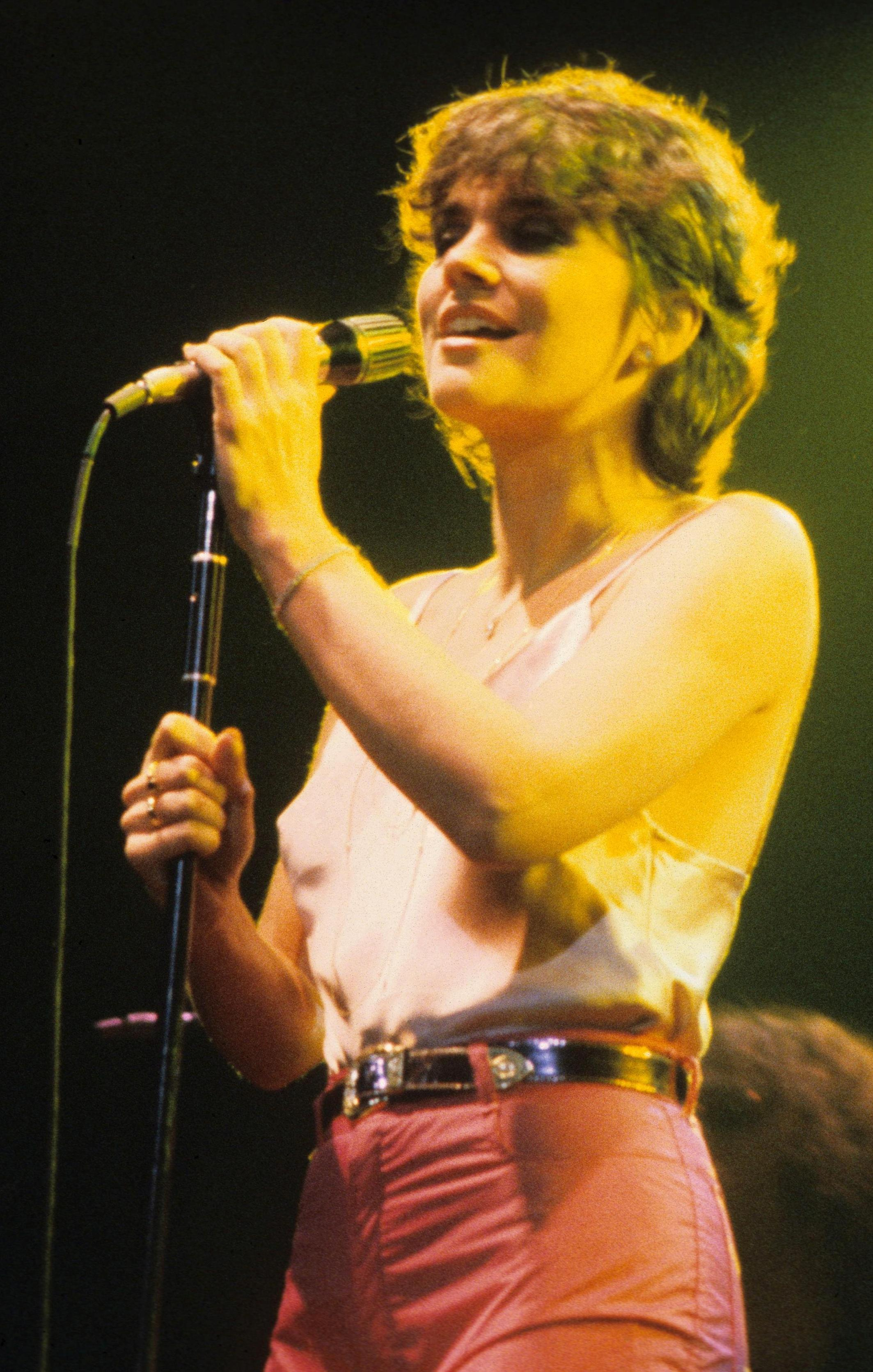
Linda Ronstadt has sold more than 100 million records, making her one of the world's best-selling artists of all time

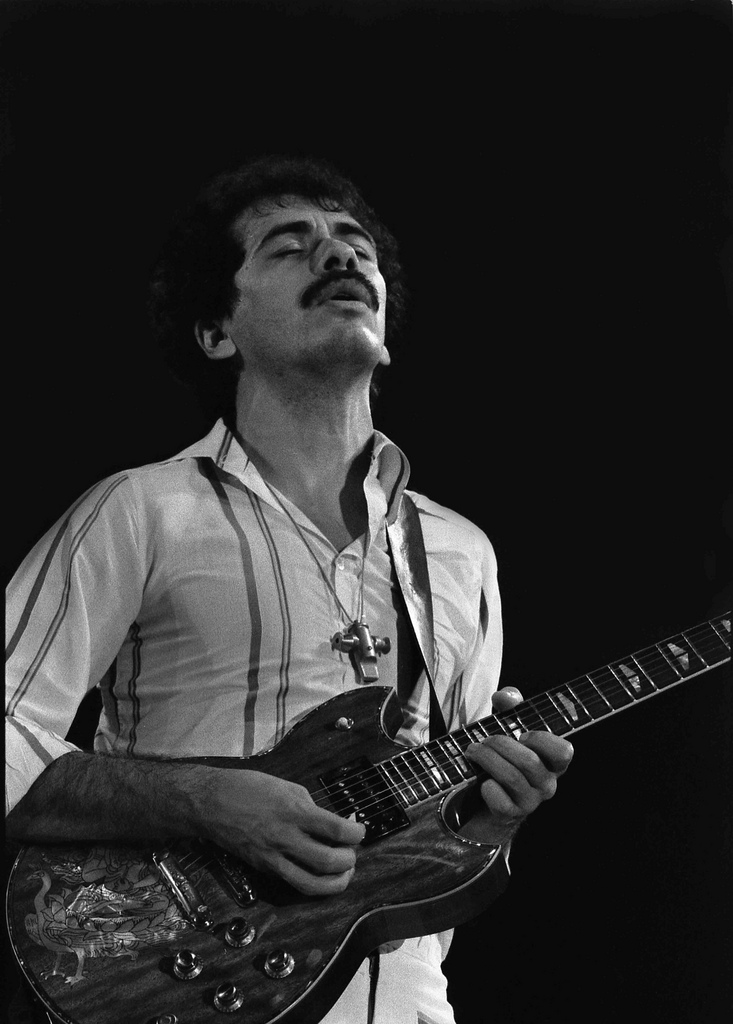
Carlos Santana

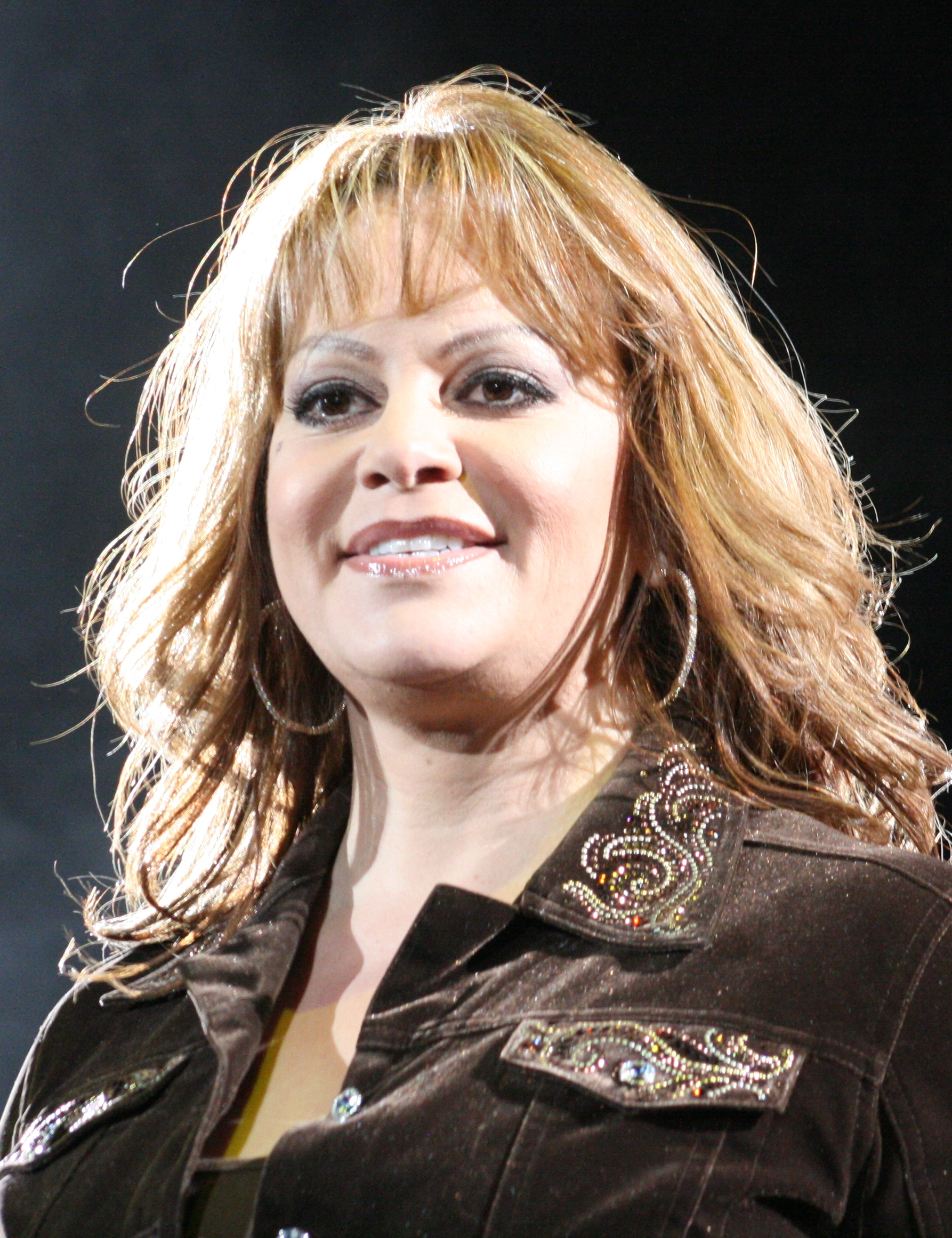
Jenni Rivera

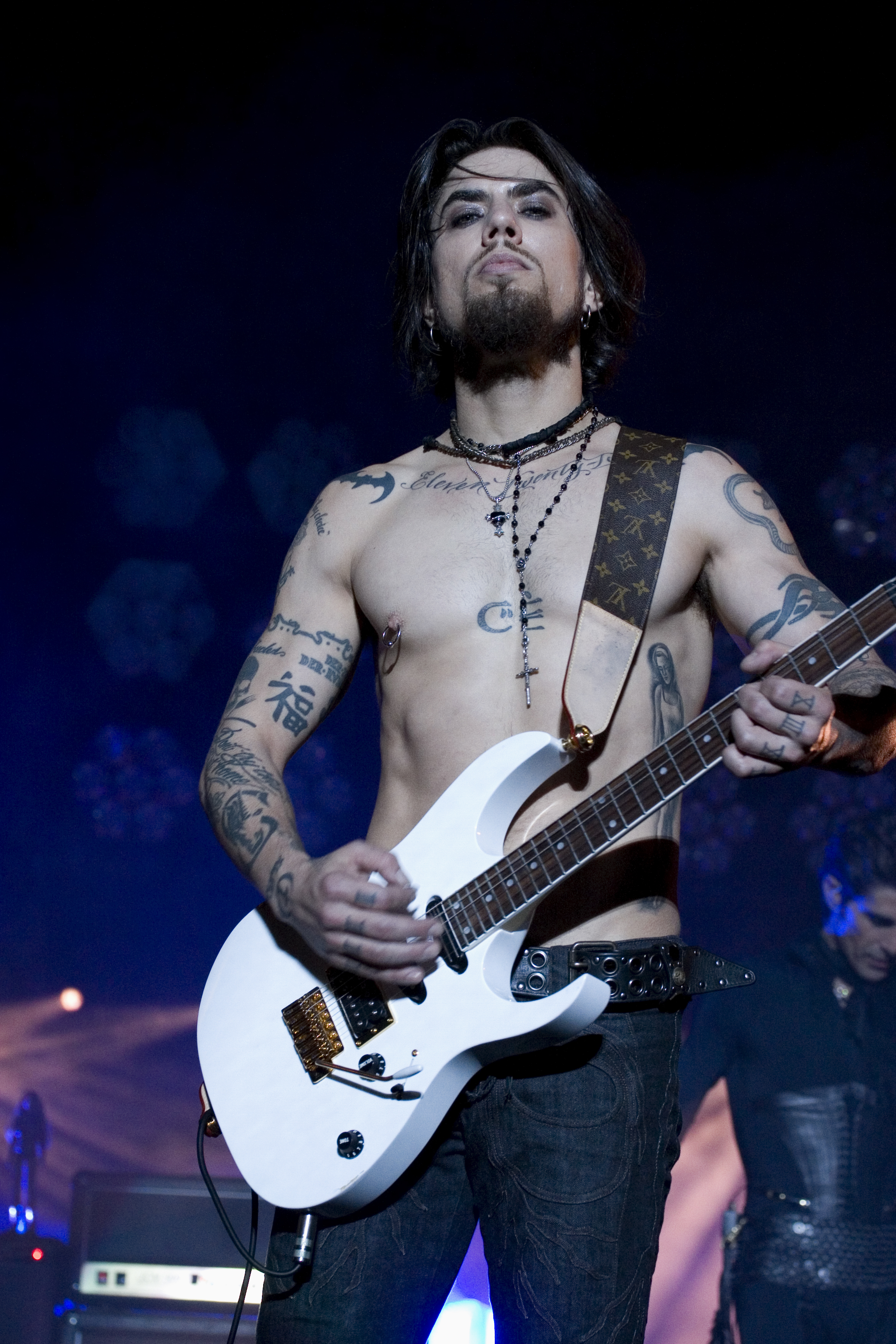
Dave Navarro

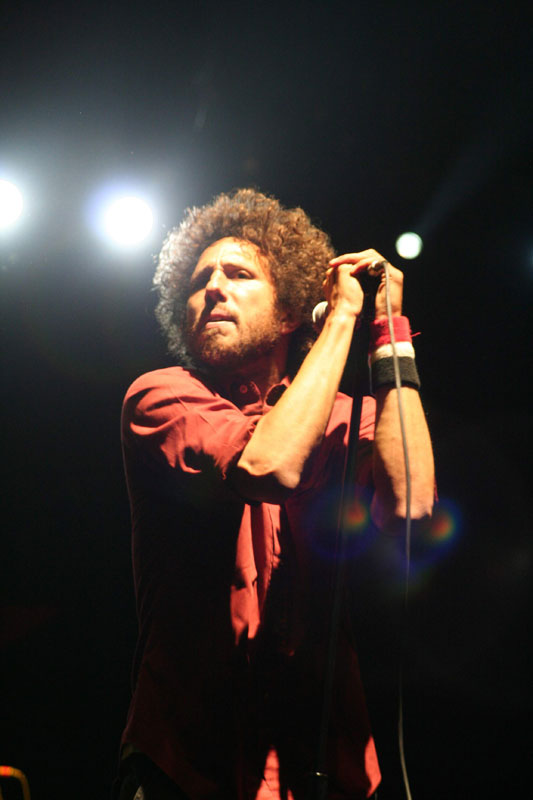
Lead singer Zack De La Rocha of Rage Against the Machine

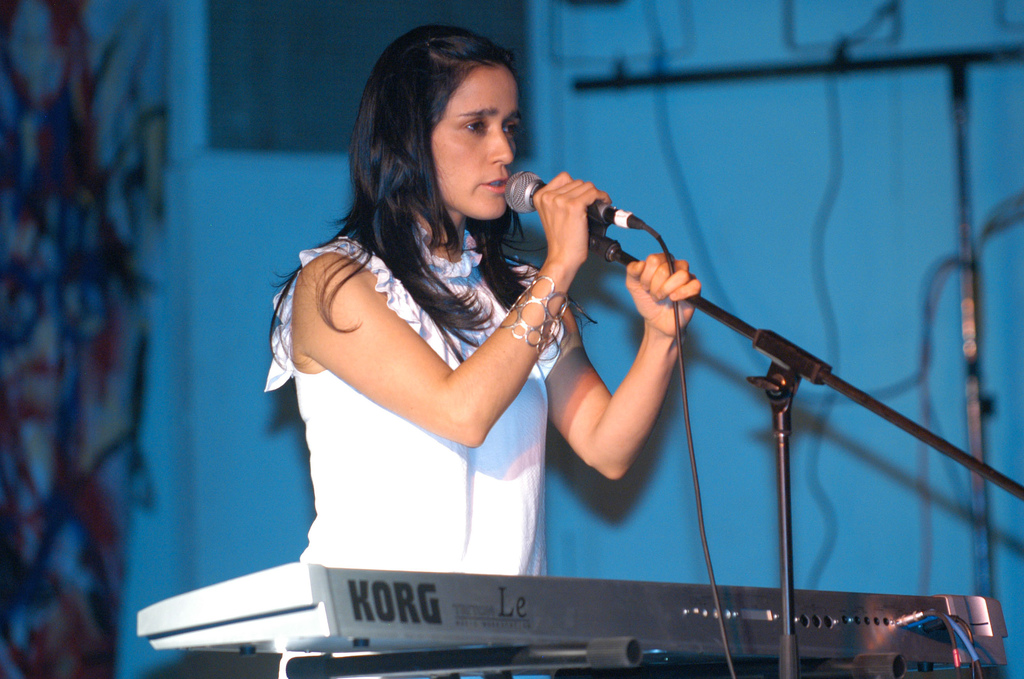
Julieta Venegas

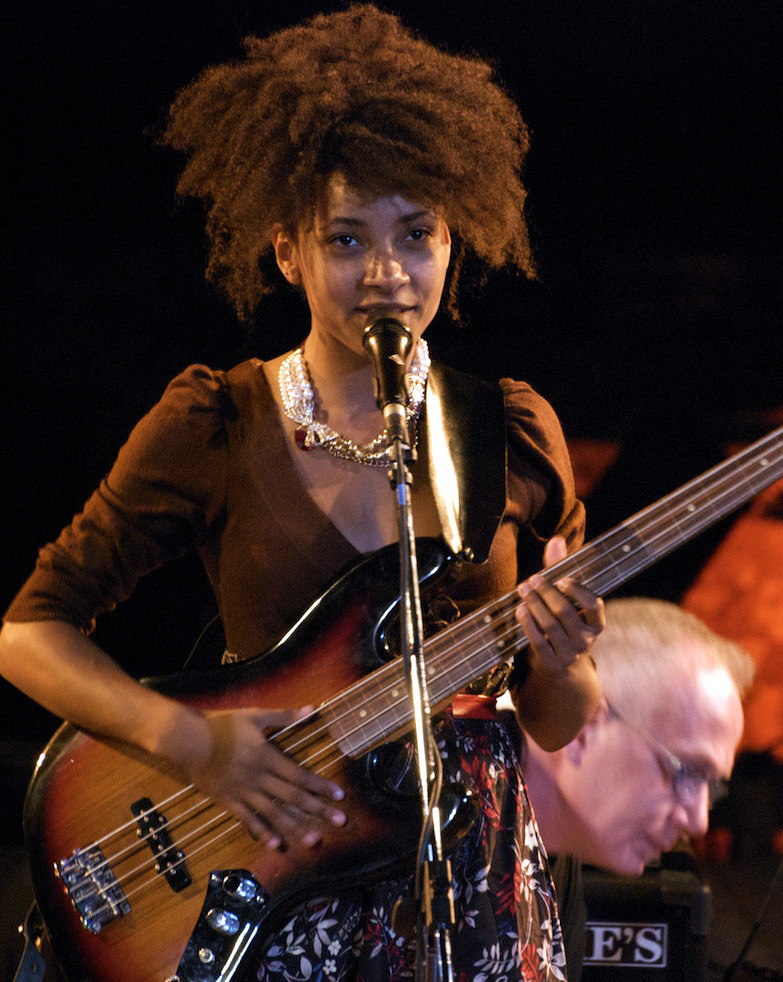
Esperanza Spalding

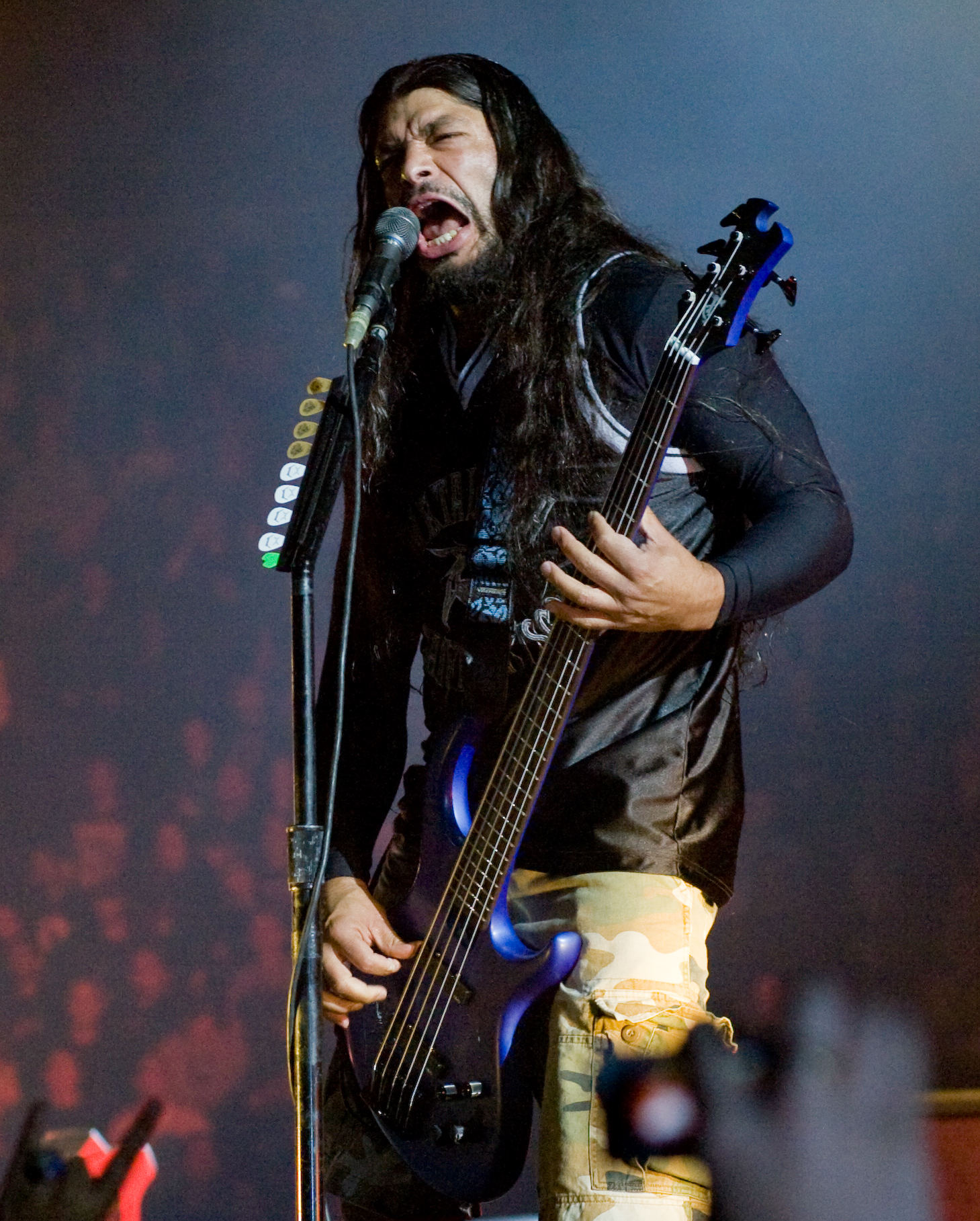
Robert Trujillo

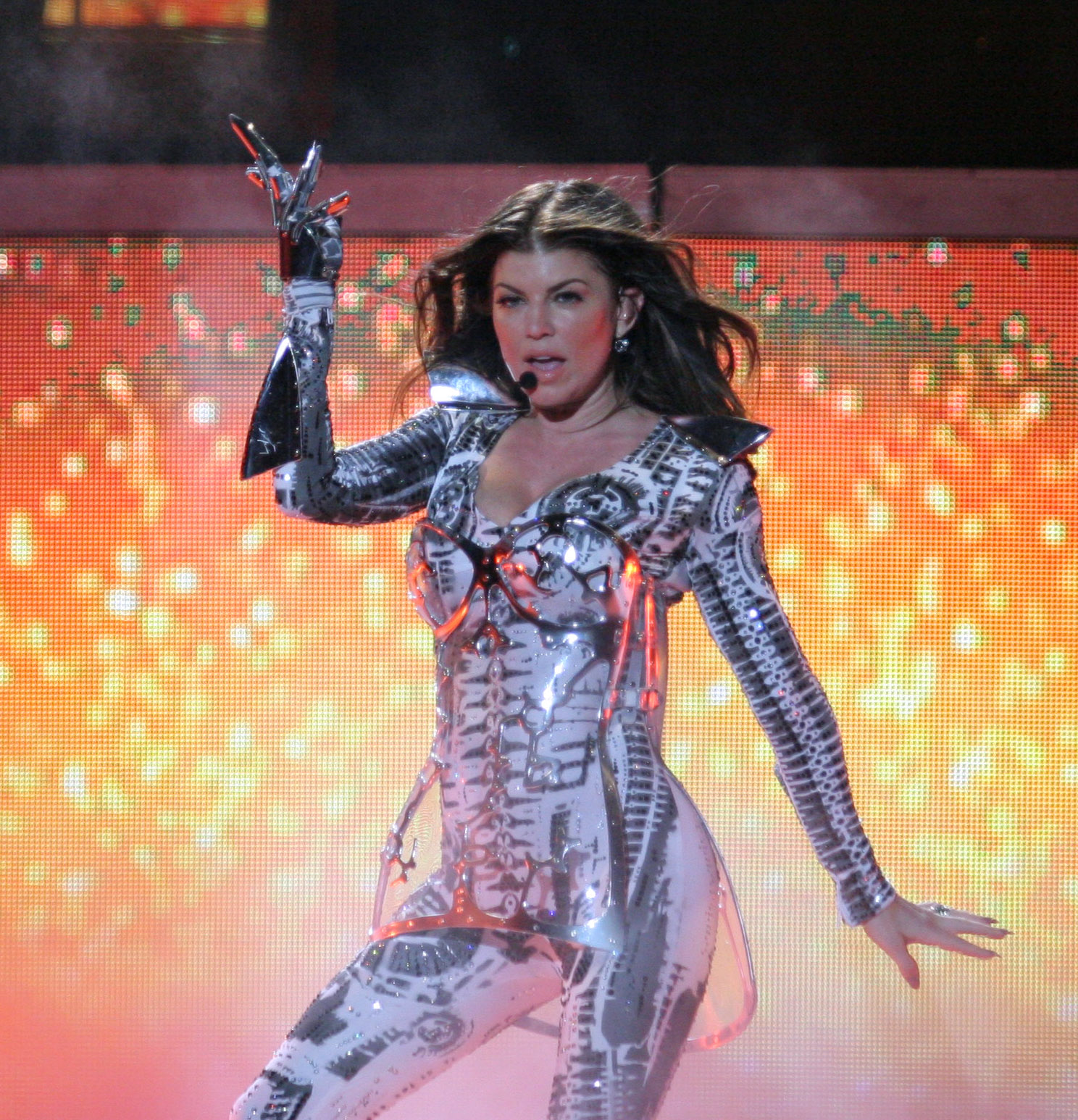
Fergie

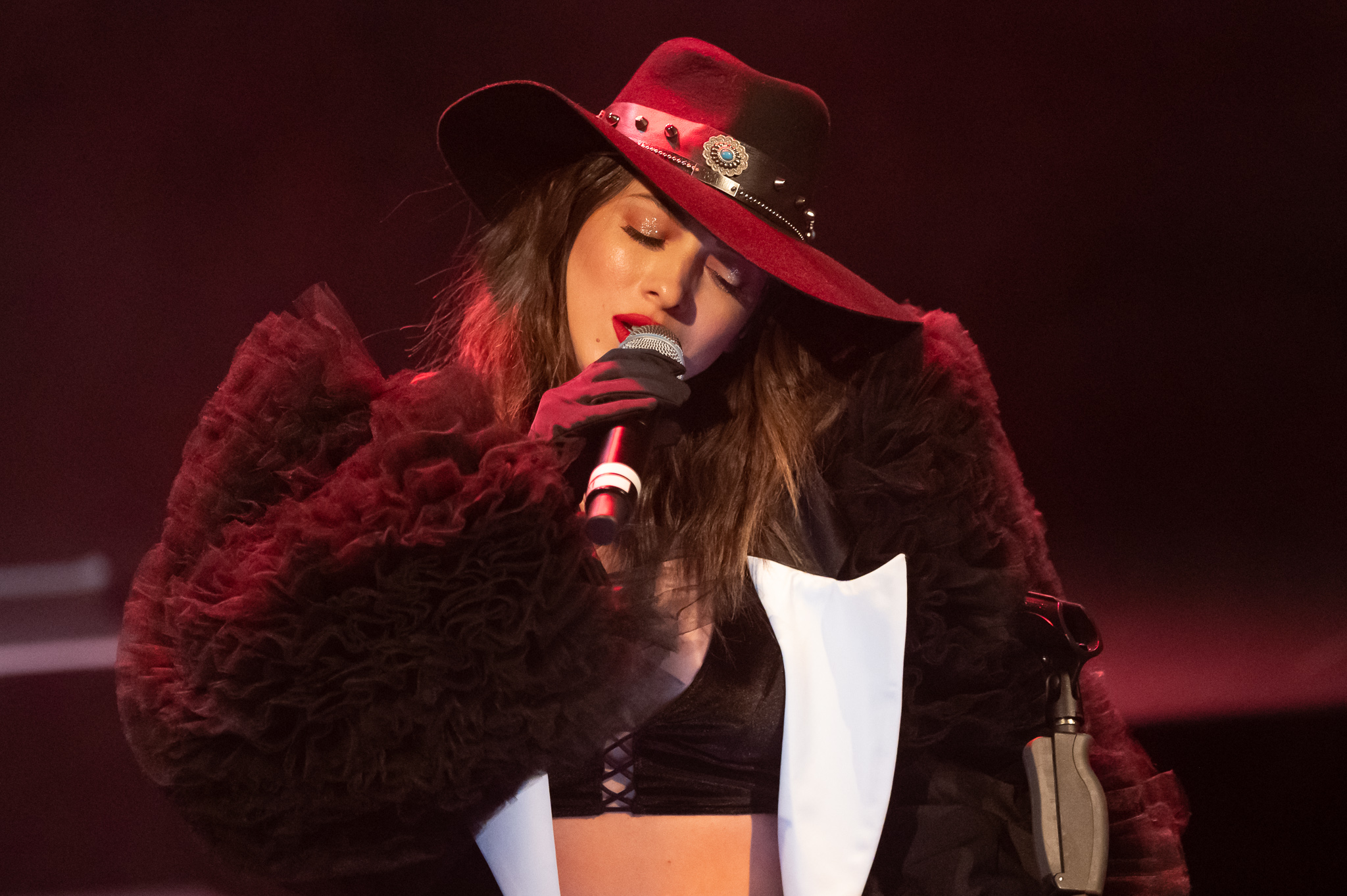
Paty Cantú

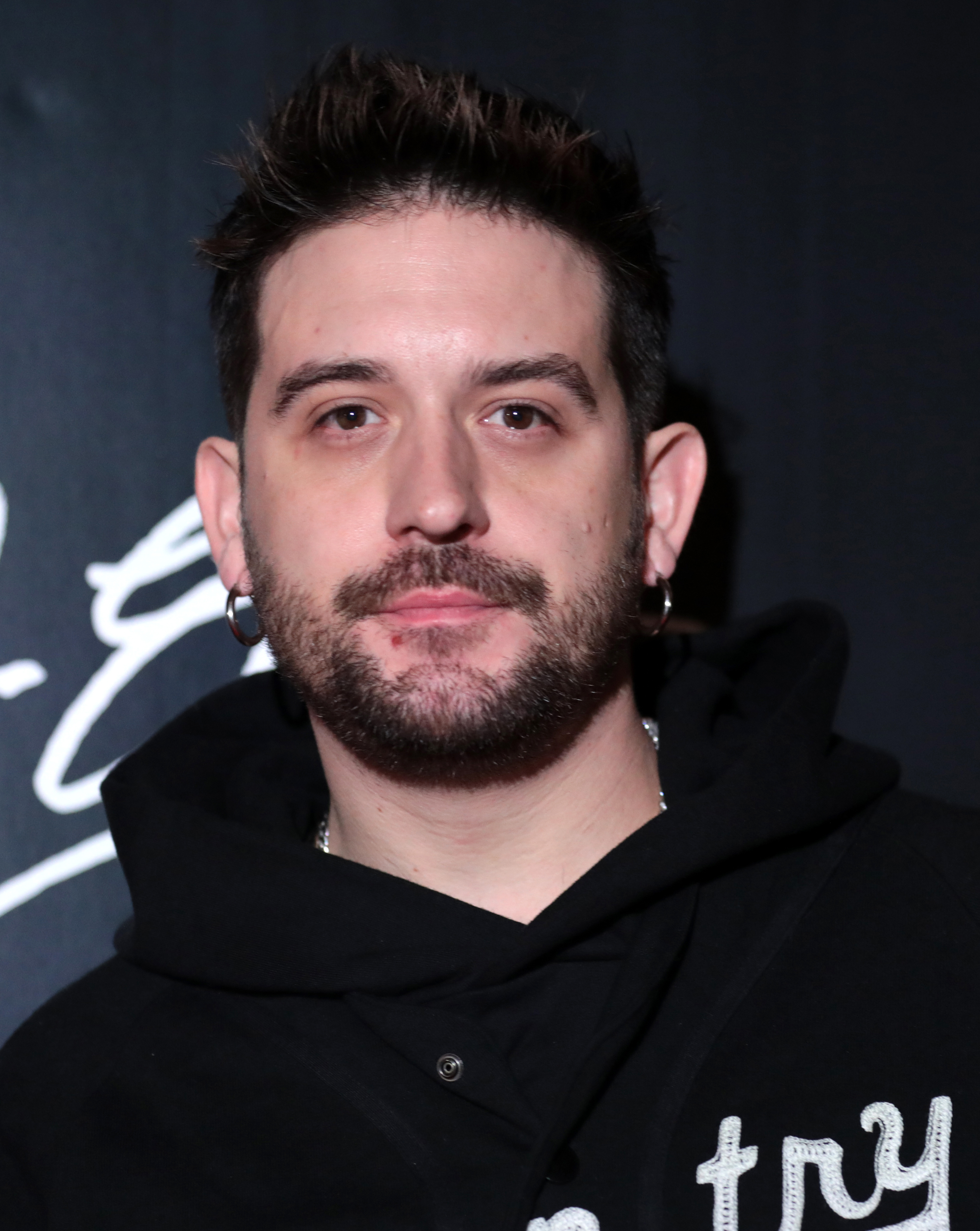
G-Eazy

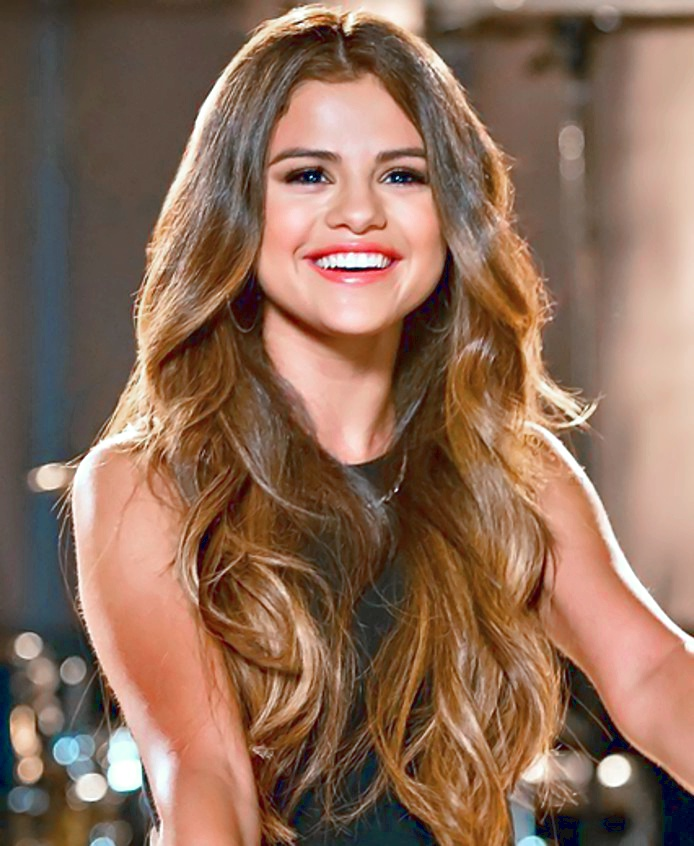
Selena Gomez

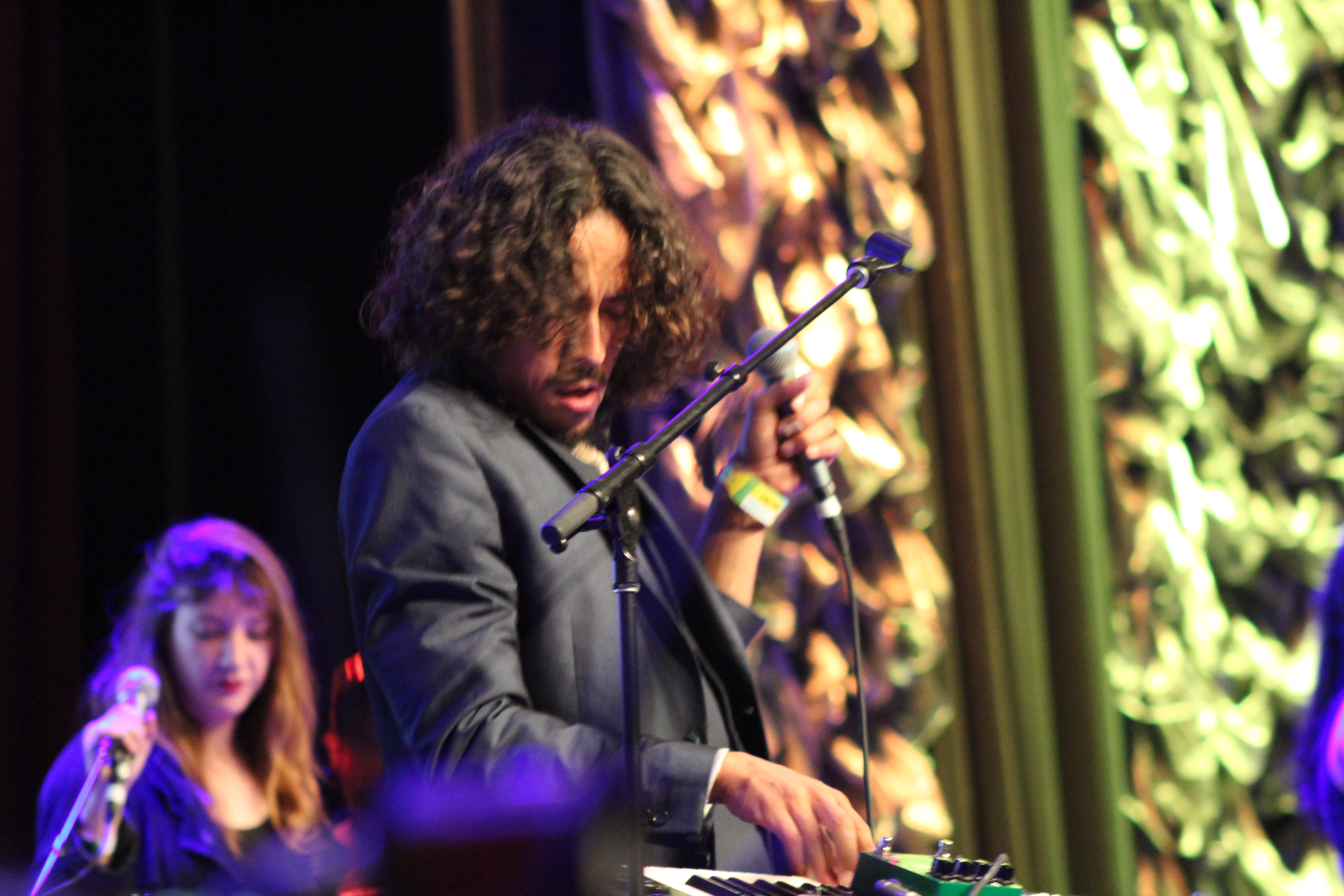
Chicano Batman

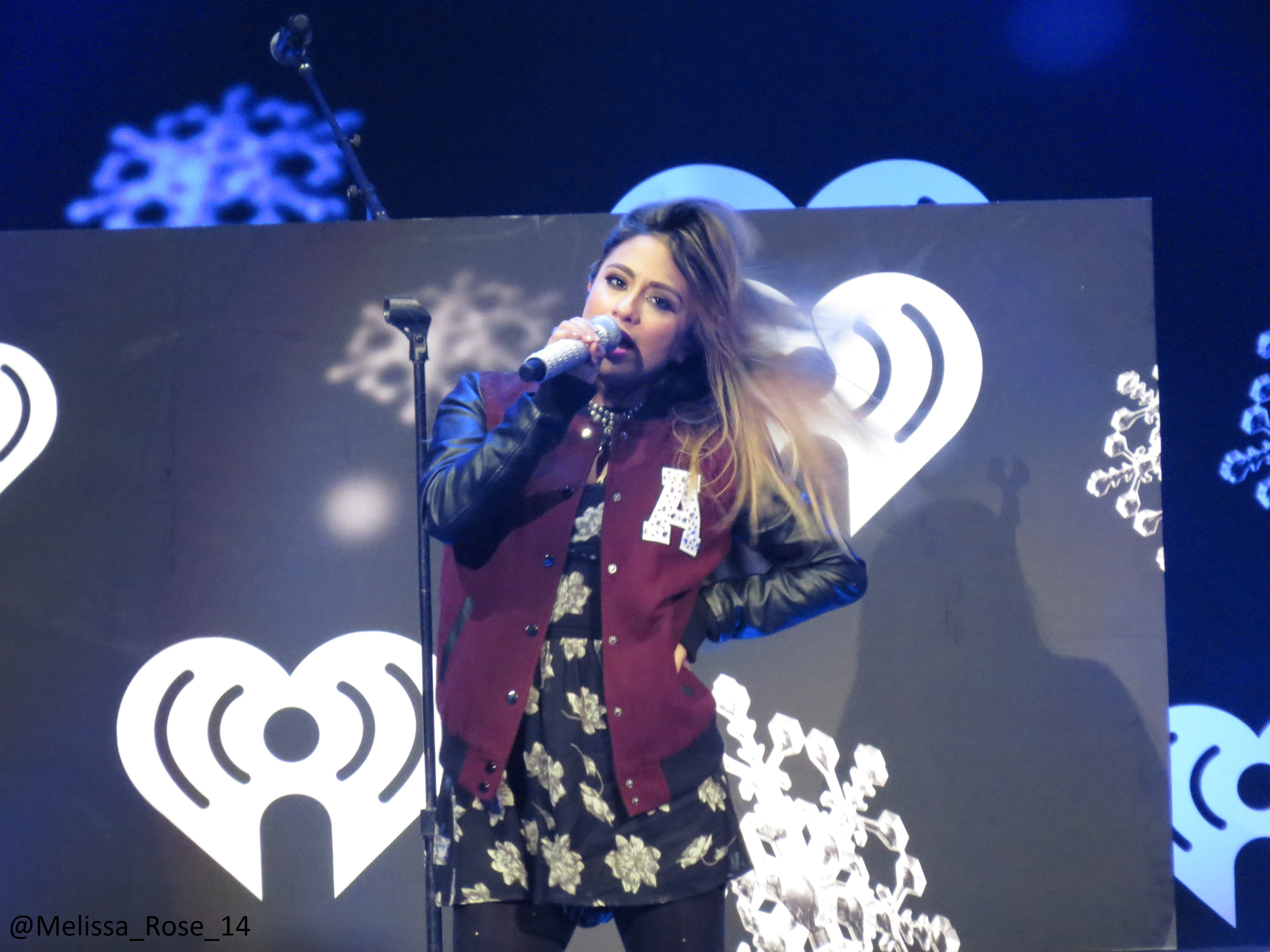
Ally Brooke

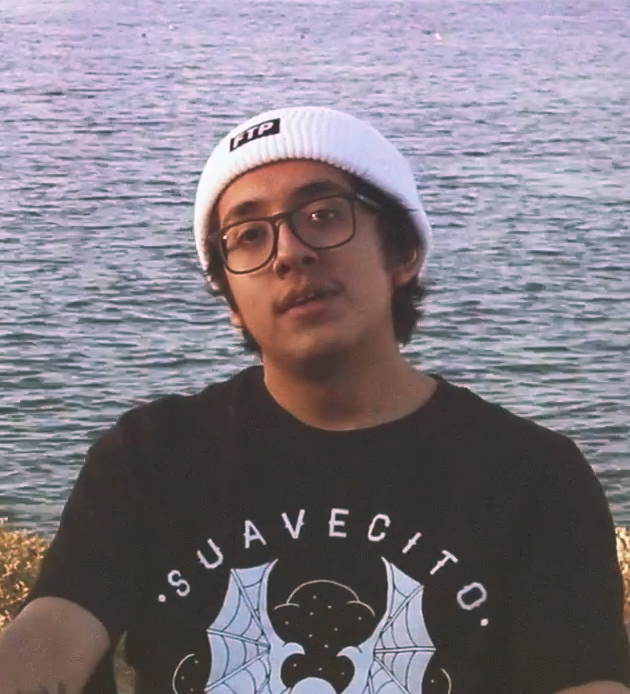
Los Angeles born singer-songwriter Cuco

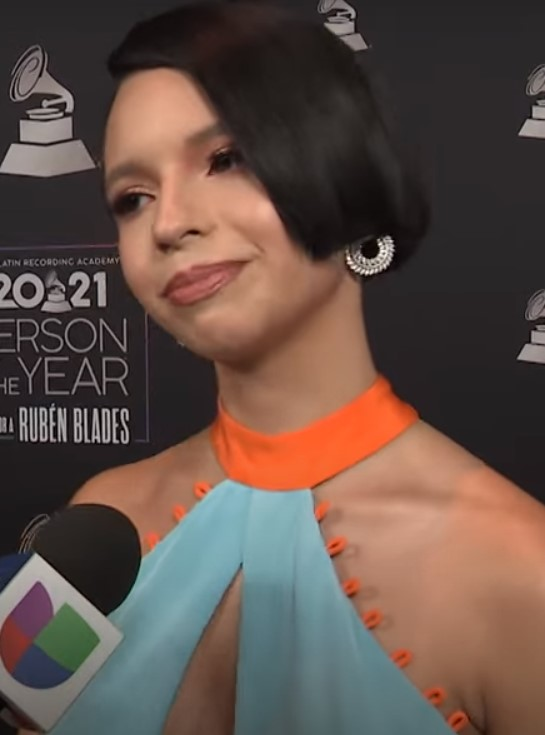
Ángela Aguilar

- 2Mex – rapper
- 2Slimey (born 2006) – rapper
- Paula DeAnda (born 1989) – singer
- Pepe Aguilar (born 1968) – singer
- Rikk Agnew (born 1958) – singer, musician
- Santiago Almeida (1911–1999) – musician, influential in the development of the musical genres of tejano and conjunto
- Anacani (born 1954) – singer
- B-Real (born 1970) – rapper
- Joan Baez (born 1941) – singer-songwriter, activist
- Baby Bash (born 1975) – rapper
- Jeff Becerra (born 1968) lead singer of the death metal band Possessed
- Becky G (born 1997) – pop singer and rapper
- Berner – rapper and entrepreneur
- Rebecca Black (born 1997) – singer
- Tony Bellamy (1946–2009) (Mexican/Yaqui) – musician and vocalist of the Native American rock band Redbone
- Betzaida (born 1981) – Latin pop singer
- Cedric Bixler-Zavala (born 1974) – singer, musician
- The Blendells – soul band
- Chingo Bling – rapper
- Beau Bokan (born 1981) – lead vocalist
- Ally Brooke (born 1993) – singer, member of Fifth Harmony
- Juan Brujo – lead singer of Brujeria
- Reginald Arvizu bassist from the band Korn
- Sabrina Bryan (born 1984) – singer, actress
- Camila Cabello (born 1997) – singer
- Chuck Cabot (1915–2007) – saxophonist and big band leader
- Carla Dirlikov Canales – mezzo-soprano singer
- Las Cafeteras – folk and traditional Mexican musical group
- Laura Canales (1954–2005) – Tejano singer
- Nati Cano (1933–2014) – Grammy Award-winning mariachi musician
- Stephen Carpenter (born 1970) – co-founder and lead guitarist of the band Deftones
- Vicki Carr (born 1941) – Grammy Award-winning singer
- Albert Castillo – music producer
- Emilio Castillo (born 1950) – founding member of Tower of Power
- Carlos Cavazo (born 1957) – lead guitarist of the rock band Quiet Riot
- Dino Cazares (born 1966) – guitarist
- Ingrid Chavez (born 1965) – singer-songwriter, poet
- Mark Chavez – musician
- El Chicano – soul and jazz band
- Chicano Batman – four-piece Chicano rock band
- Keyshia Cole – R&B singer (Paternal Mexican ancestry)
- Lisa Coleman (born 1960) – Grammy and ASCAP Award-winning musician/composer, funk keyboardist, member of Prince and The Revolution and Wendy and Lisa
- Ramiro Cortés (1933–1984) – classical composer
- Cuco (born 1998) – singer-songwriter, and producer
- Kid Cudi (born 1984) – rapper, singer, record producer, and actor
- Marcos Curiel (born 1974) – guitarist
- Ray Dalton – singer (Mexican-American mother)
- Alfonso D'Artega (1907–1998) – songwriter and conductor
- Diana DeGarmo (born 1987) – singer, actress
- Fito de la Parra – drummer of Canned Heat
- Zack De La Rocha (born 1970) – rapper, singer, poet, lead member of Rage Against the Machine
- Gonzalo de la Torre (born 1977) – singer, musician
- Grey DeLisle (born 1973) – singer-songwriter, voice actress
- Andrew Martinez (1983–2009) – drummer
- Lhasa De Sela (1972–2010) – singer-songwriter
- Deorro (born 1991) – DJ
- Dev (singer) (born 1989) – singer, rapper, model and radio host
- Down AKA Kilo (born 1985) – rapper
- Nadir D'Priest – musician
- Sheila E. (born 1957) – musician
- Roberto Enrique – singer-songwriter, actor
- Joe Escalante (born 1963) – musician
- Alejandro Escovedo (born 1951) – singer-songwriter, musician
- Coke Escovedo (1941–1986) – percussionist
- Pete Escovedo (born 1935) – percussionist
- Mimi Fariña (1945–2001) – singer-songwriter
- Louis Febre (born 1959) – Mexican-born composer
- Freddy Fender (1937–2006) – Tejano and country musician
- Fergie (born 1975) – singer-songwriter, actress, member of The Black Eyed Peas
- Rosita Fernández (1918–2006) – Tejano singer
- Aundrea Fimbres (born 1983) – singer, member of Danity Kane
- Dom Flemons (born 1982) – singer, Grammy nominee
- Paty Cantú (born 1983) – singer, musician
- Rosie Flores (born 1950) – rockabilly and country singer
- Mando Fresko (born 1987) – DJ, radio personality, actor
- Frost (born 1962) – rapper
- Kap G (born 1994) – rapper
- Victoria Galvan (born 1986) – singer, musician
- Andrew Garcia (born 1985) – musician, American Idol (Season 9 contestant)
- Eva Garza (1917–1966) – vocalist, film actress
- G-Eazy (born 1989) – rapper
- Vivica Genaux (born 1969) – operatic mezzo-soprano
- Girl In a Coma – rock band
- Juan Gotti – rapper
- Selena Gomez (born 1992) – singer, actress
- Lalo Guerrero (1916–2005) – singer-songwriter
- María Grever (1894–1951) – prolific Emmy Award-winning composer who achieved international recognition
- Ha*Ash – rock pop duo
- Cenobio Hernandez (1863–1950) – composer
- Daniel Hernandez – rapper better known as 6ix9ine
- Marcos Hernandez (born 1982) – singer-songwriter
- Miguel (born 1985) – recording artist, songwriter, producer of Mexican and African-American descent
- Raymond Herrera (born 1972) – drummer
- David Hidalgo (born 1954) – singer-songwriter
- Marques Houston (born 1981) – singer
- Intocable – Tejano band
- Frankie J (born 1975) – singer
- Johnny J (1969–2008) – multi-platinum music producer, rapper, songwriter
- Prima J – Pop duo
- Flaco Jiménez (1939–2025) – accordionist, musician
- Santiago Jiménez Jr. (born 1944) – folk musician, won the National Heritage Fellowship for lifetime achievement in traditional Tex-Mex/folk music
- Little Joe (born 1940) – Tejano performer
- Maya Jupiter (born 1978) – DJ, emcee
- Jeanette Jurado (born 1965) – singer, member of the girl group Exposé which achieved much success between 1984 and 1993, becoming the first group to have four top ten hits on the Billboard Hot 100 chart from its debut album
- DJ Kane (born 1975) – singer
- Joshua Kadison (born 1965) – singer-songwriter
- Kehlani (born 1995) – singer
- Down AKA Kilo (born 1985) – rapper
- Apollonia Kotero (born 1959) – actress, singer and model
- Stefano Langone (born 1989) – singer
- Shelly Lares (born 1971) – singer
- Kiana Lede (born 1997) – singer
- Lucky Luciano – rapper
- A Lighter Shade of Brown – rap group
- The Lennon Sisters – vocal group, popular during the '50s and '60s
- Robert Lopez (born 1960) – musician
- Trini Lopez (1937–2020) – singer, guitarist
- Demi Lovato (born 1992) – singer and actress
- Kirstin Maldonado (born 1992) – member of Grammy-winning group Pentatonix
- Malo – Latin rock and roll soul band
- Angélica María (born 1944) – Lifetime Grammy Award-winning singer-songwriter and actress
- Marisela (born 1966) – singer
- Cruz Martínez (born 1972) – musician, music producer
- Narciso Martínez (1911–1992) – musician, influential in the development of the musical genres of tejano and conjunto
- Vicci Martinez (born 1984) – singer-songwriter
- Xiuhtezcatl Martinez (born 2000) – hip hop artist
- Julia Michaels – singer-songwriter (Mexican-Puerto Rican father)
- Lydia Mendoza (1916–2007) – Tejano music singer
- Jorge Mester (born 1935) – conductor
- Roy Mitchell-Cardenas (born 1977) – rock bassist
- Laura Molina (born 1957) – singer, musician, artist, painter, muralist
- Chris Montez (born 1943) – singer, musician
- Manuel Mora (1919–2001) – musician
- Annette Moreno (born 1972) – Grammy-nominated Spanish-language Christian music singer
- Chino Moreno (born 1973) – lead singer of Team Sleep and Deftones
- Ricardo Zohn-Muldoon (born 1962) – composer, finalist for the 2011 Pulitzer Prize for Music
- Myra (born 1986) – singer-songwriter
- Natalie (born 1979) – singer-songwriter
- Los Nativos – rap group
- Emilio Navaira (1962–2016) – Tejano singer, Grammy Award winner
- Dave Navarro (born 1967) – guitarist
- Vince Neil (born 1961) – lead vocalist of the band Mötley Crüe
- Asia Nitollano (born 1988) – member of The Pussycat Dolls
- OhGeesy (born 1993) – rapper and member of Shoreline Mafia
- Pete Orta (born 1971) – Grammy Award-winning guitarist Petra
- José Pasillas (born 1976) – drummer
- Sara Paxton (born 1988) – singer, actress
- Pee Wee (born 1988) – singer-songwriter, actor
- Jennifer Peña (born 1983) – Tejano singer
- Bobby Pulido (born 1971) – singer-songwriter
- Amanda Perez (born 1980) – singer-songwriter
- Chris Pérez (born 1969) – singer, operatic soprano
- Chris Pérez – Grammy Award-winning guitarist
- Jay Perez (born 1963) – Tejano singer
- Yolanda Pérez (born 1983) – musician, singer
- Romina Power (born 1951) – singer-songwriter, actress
- Snow Tha Product (born 1987) – rapper
- A.B. Quintanilla (born 1963) – musician, music producer
- Abraham Quintanilla (1939–2025) – singer-songwriter
- Ramirez (born 1994) – rapper and songwriter
- Elida Reyna (born 1972) – Tejano singer
- Johnny Richards (1911–1968) – jazz composer active during the 1950s and 1960s
- Jenni Rivera (1969–2012) – singer-songwriter
- Lil Rob (born 1975) – rapper
- Roger Rocha – singer-songwriter, guitarist for the group 4 Non Blondes
- Johnny Rodriguez (1951–2025) – country music singer
- Robert Xavier Rodriguez (born 1946) – classical composer
- Sixto Rodriguez (1942–2023) – folk musician
- Chan Romero (1941–2024) – singer, musician
- Linda Ronstadt (born 1946) – Grammy Award-winning musician
- Rick Rosas (1949–2014) – singer, musician, bassist for Joe Walsh and Neil Young, Crosby Stills Nash and Young, Buffalo Springfield, Crazy horse
- Andy Russell (1919–1992) vocalist, specializing in traditional pop and Latin music. His parents were Mexican immigrants
- Sam the Sham (born 1937) – leader of Sam the Sham and the Pharaohs
- Adán Sánchez (1979–2004) – singer, son of Chalino Sanchez
- Antonio Sanchez (born 1971) – jazz drummer, composed film score for the film Birdman, Golden Globe-nominated
- Jessica Sanchez (born 1995) – singer; father is Mexican American
- Hope Sandoval (born 1966) – singer-songwriter
- Esteban Jordan (1939–2010) – singer-songwriter
- Sonny Sandoval (born 1974) – singer, member of P.O.D.
- Carlos Santana (born 1947) – Grammy Award-winning guitarist
- Selena Quintanilla-Pérez (1971–1995) – Tejano superstar / Grammy award-winning singer
- Jessy Serrata (1953–2017) – Tejano musician
- Arban Severin (born 1976) – musician, actress
- Mariee Sioux (born 1985) – folk singer-songwriter
- Denise Stefanie (born 1988) – singer
- Steve Soto (1963–2018) – punk rock guitarist
- Comanche Sound – Grammy-nominated producer
- Shakey Graves (born 1987) – Americana musician
- Esperanza Spalding (born 1984) – jazz singer, musician
- Taboo (born 1975) – rapper, member of The Black Eyed Peas
- Abel Talamantez (born 1978) – singer; former member of Menudo, MDO, Kumbia Kings, Los Super Reyes and Los EnVivo Kings
- John Tejada (born 1974) – electronic musician, music producer
- Thee Midniters – rock and soul band
- Melody Thornton (born 1984) – singer, model, member of The Pussycat Dolls
- Tierra – R&B, soul band
- Randy Torres – guitarist
- Tina Piña Trachtenburg – rock pop band
- Robert Treviño (born 1984) – music conductor
- Robert Trujillo (born 1964) – bassist
- John Trudell (1946–2015) – musician, author, poet, political activist
- Chayito Valdez (1945–2016) – singer, actress
- Ritchie Valens (1941–1959) – singer, musician
- Patrick and Lolly Vegas – Mexican/Yaqui/Shoshone musicians and vocalists of the Native American rock band Redbone
- Jaci Velasquez (born 1979) – contemporary Christian Latin pop singer
- Julieta Venegas (born 1970) – singer-songwriter, instrumentalist
- Cassie Ventura (born 1986) – singer-songwriter and dancer
- Angela Via (born 1981) – singer-songwriter
- Jasmine Villegas (born 1993) – R&B, pop singer
- Kyle Vincent – singer-songwriter; producer
- Lil Xan (born 1996) – rapper
- Yeat (born 2000) – rapper, singer, producer; paternal grandmother is Mexican and is from Tijuana
- Taco Shop Poets – spoken word and world music band
- The Zeros – punk-rock band
- That Mexican OT – rapper

=== Authors and poets ===
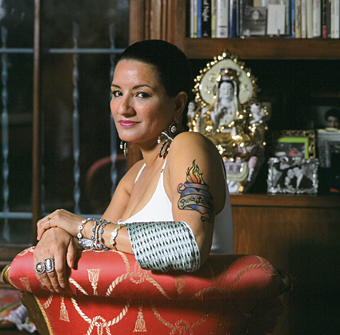
Sandra Cisneros, author of The House on Mango Street (1983)

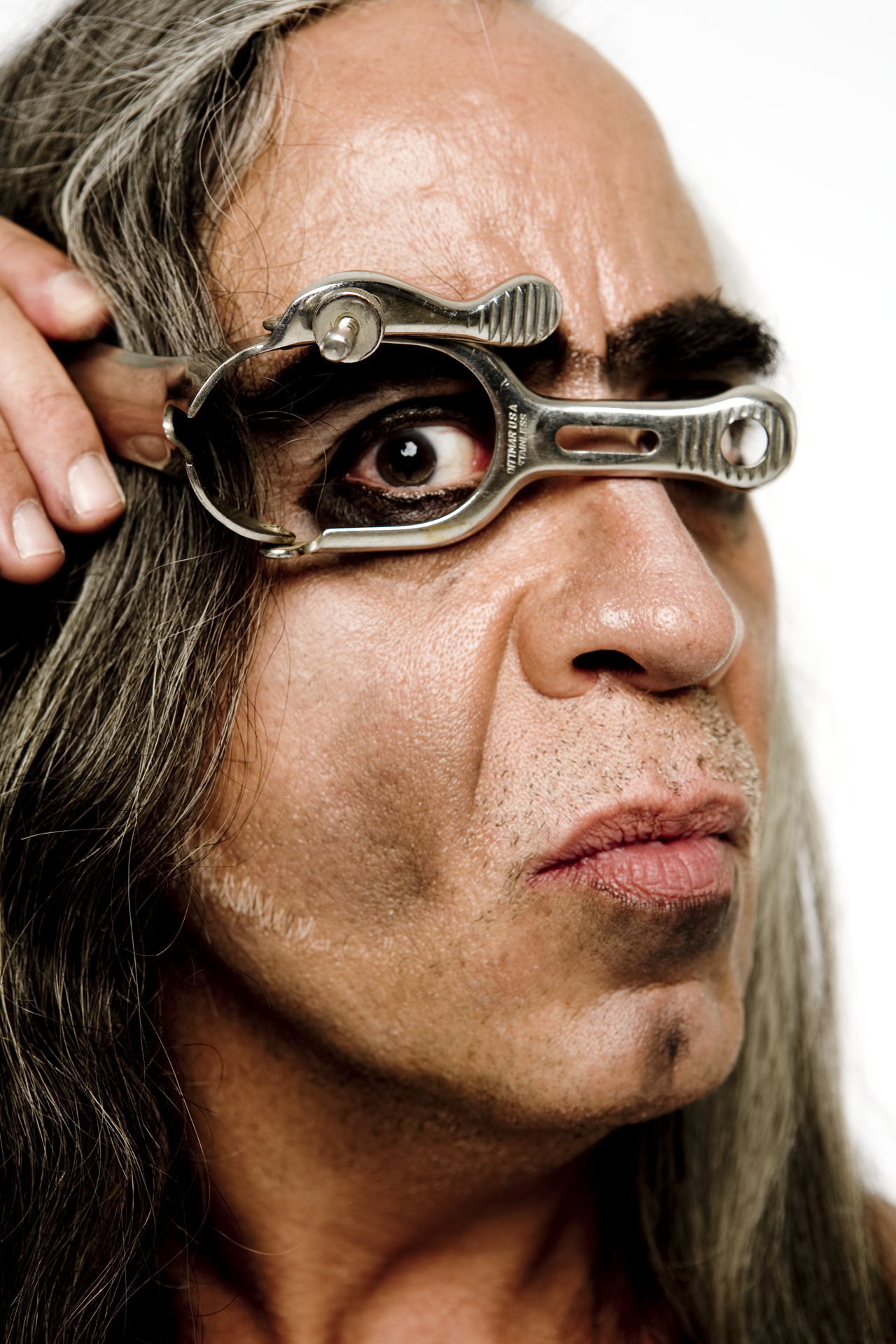
Guillermo Gómez-Peña

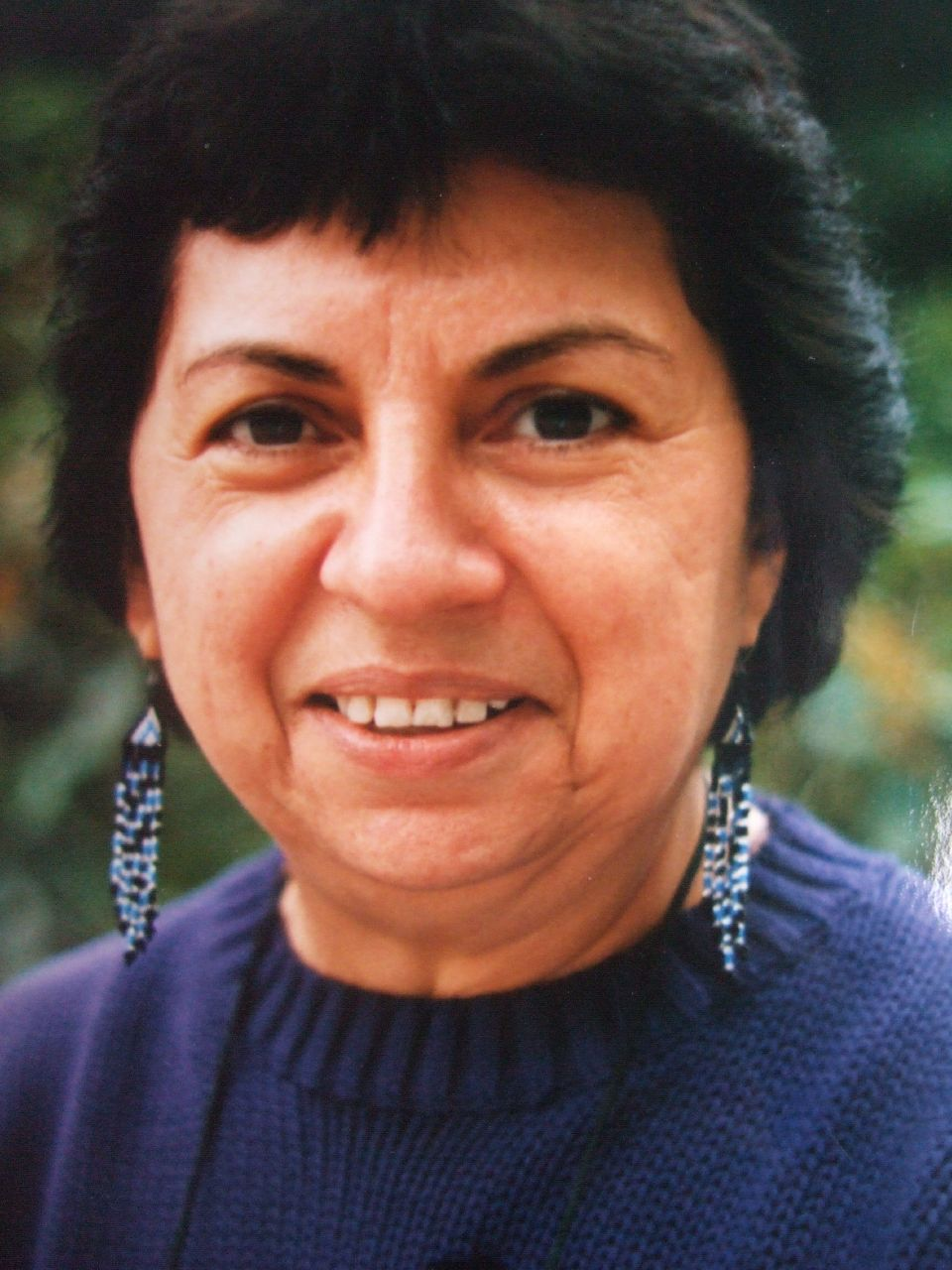
Gloria E. Anzaldúa

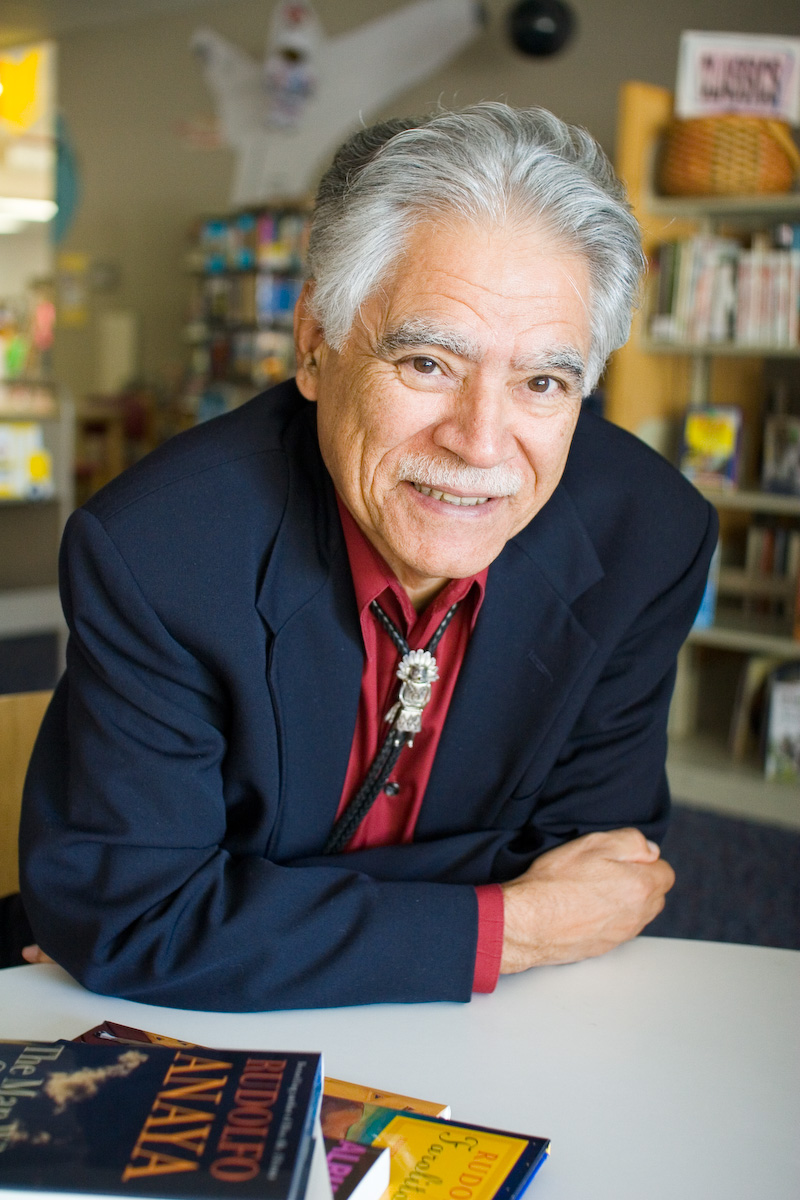
Rudolfo Anaya

- Oscar Zeta Acosta (1935–1974) – minor novelist, activist, attorney and politician
- Francisco X. Alarcon (1954–2016) – author, poet, activist, and college professor
- Alurista (born 1947) – poet, activist, and college professor
- María Amparo Ruiz De Burton (1832–1895) – author
- James Anaya – poet
- Rudolfo Anaya (1937–2020) – author
- Gloria E. Anzaldúa (1942–2004) – author, poet, scholar and activist
- Chloe Aridjis – novelist
- Alfred Arteaga – poet and writer
- Carmen Beltrán (1905–2002) – poet and playwright
- Silvester Brito (1937–2018) – poet and academic
- Xochiquetzal Candelaria (born 1973) – poet and professor
- Norma Elia Cantú (born 1947) – writer and professor
- Ana Castillo (born 1953) – author, novelist, poet and essayist
- Lorna Dee Cervantes (born 1954) – poet
- Ingrid Chavez (born 1965) – singer-songwriter and poet
- Sandra Cisneros (born 1954) – author, novelist and poet
- María Antonieta Collins (born 1952) – TV host, journalist and author
- Lucha Corpi (born 1945) – poet and writer
- Carlos Cumpián (born 1953) – author and poet
- María Amparo Escandón (born 1957) – novelist, screenwriter, advertising creative director, and film producer
- Diana Gabaldon (born 1952) – novelist
- Dana Gioia (born 1950) – writer, chairman of the National Endowment of the Arts
- Guillermo Gómez-Peña (born 1955) – artist, author, poet and activist
- Rigoberto González (born 1970) – author and critic
- Rodolfo Gonzales (1928–2005) – political activist, poet and featherweight boxing champion
- Reyna Grande (born 1975) – author, memoirist
- Juan Felipe Herrera (born 1948) – poet, author, translator and activist
- Miriam Herrera – author and poet
- Rolando Hinojosa (1929–2022) – author, novelist, poet and essayist
- Luis Leal (writer) (1907–2010) – writer and literary critic
- Elizabeth Martínez – activist and author
- Paul Martínez Pompa – author and poet
- José Montalvo (1946–1994) – author, poet and activist
- José Montoya (1932–2013) – artist and poet
- Pat Mora (born 1942) – author and poet
- Cherríe Moraga (born 1952) – author, poet, essayist and activist
- Angela Morales (born 1966) – award-winning essayist
- Julian Nava (1927–2022) – author, educator and diplomat
- Daniel Olivas (born 1959) – author and attorney
- Americo Paredes (1915–1999) – novelist
- Tomás Rivera (1935–1984) – author, poet and educator
- Alberto Rios (born 1952) – American poet and author
- Luis J. Rodriguez (born 1954) – author, poet, novelist, journalist, critic and columnist
- Richard Rodriguez (born 1944) – author
- Pam Muñoz Ryan (born 1951) – award-winning children's author
- Luis Omar Salinas (1937–2008) – author and poet
- raúlrsalinas (1934–2008) – activist and poet
- Erika Sánchez (born 1984) – author and poet
- Ricardo Sánchez (1941–1995) – poet and professor
- Ricardo Sanchez (born 1953) – author and United States Army general
- Jimmy Santiago Baca (born 1952) – author and poet
- John Phillip Santos (born 1957) – author, journalist, and filmmaker
- Leslie Marmon Silko (born 1948) – writer, key figure in the First Wave of the Native American Literary Renaissance
- Octavio Solis (born 1958) – award-winning playwright and director
- Gary Soto (born 1952) – author and poet
- Luis Talamantez (born 1943) – poet and activist
- Sergio Troncoso (born 1961) – author, novelist, short-story writer and essayist
- John Trudell (1946–2015) – musician, author, poet and political activist
- Luís Alberto Urrea (born 1955) – author, poet, novelist and essayist
- José Antonio Villarreal (1924–2010) – author and novelist
- Victor Villaseñor (born 1940) – author and public speaker
- Maria Helena Viramontes (born 1954) – author and professor
- Karen Zacarias (born 1969) – award-winning playwright

=== Visual arts ===
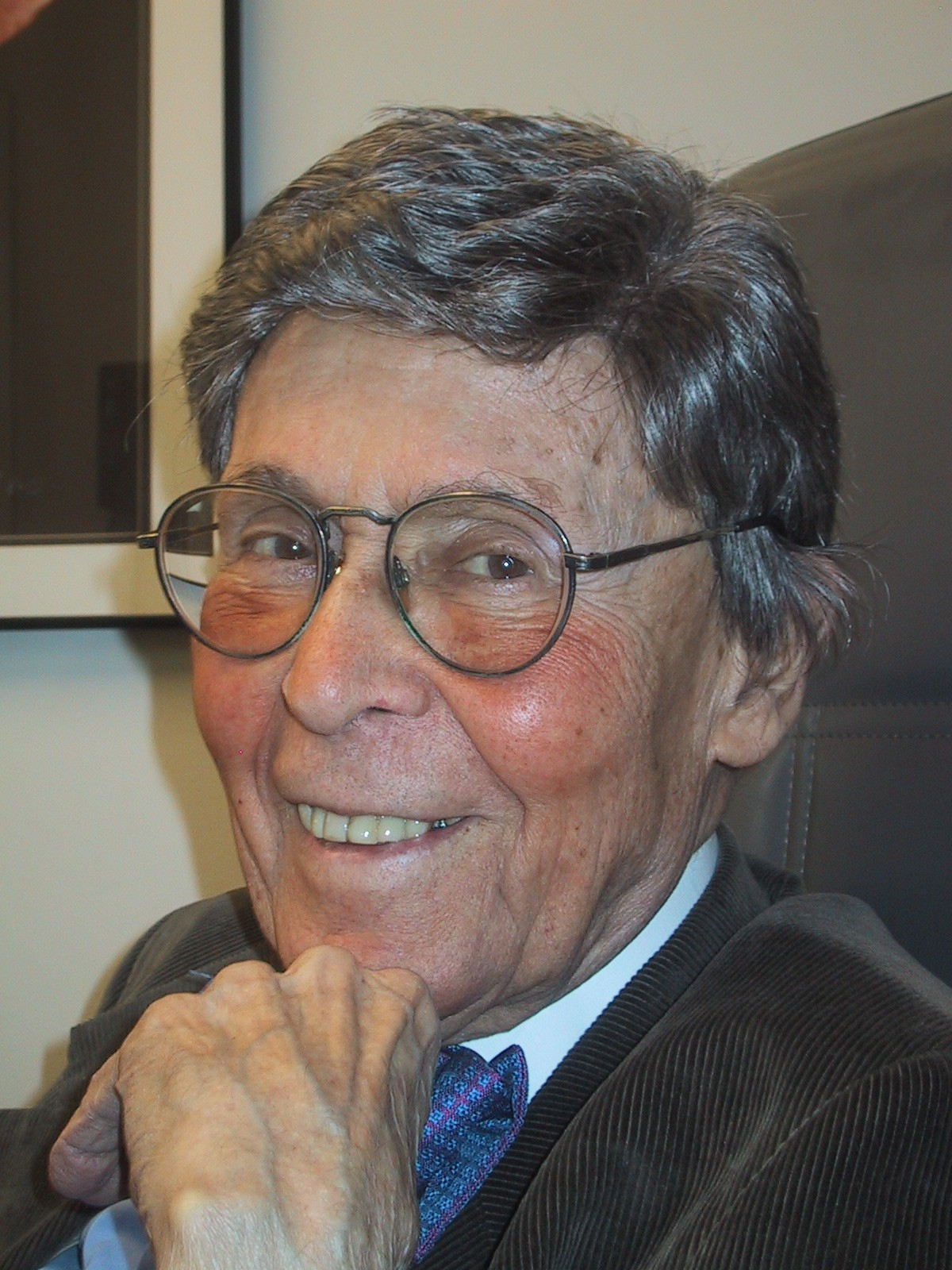
Edgar de Evia

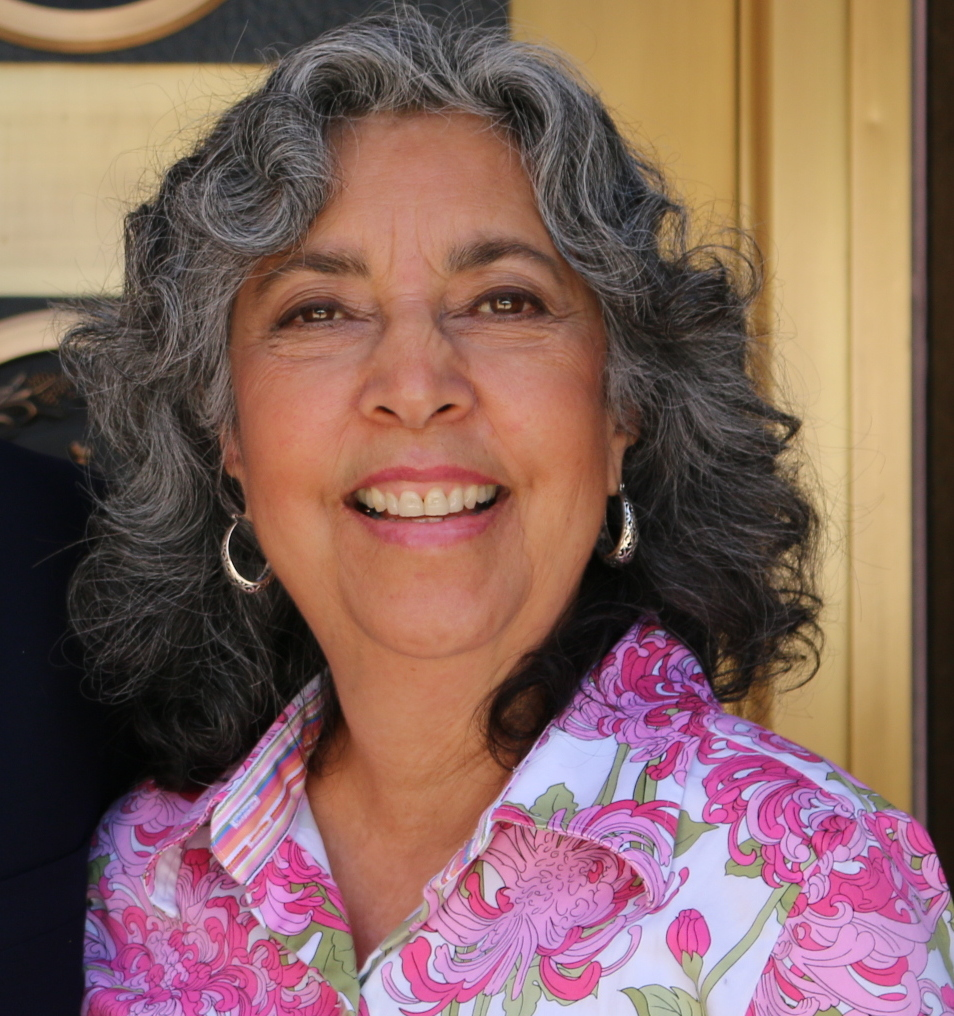
Carmen Lomas Garza

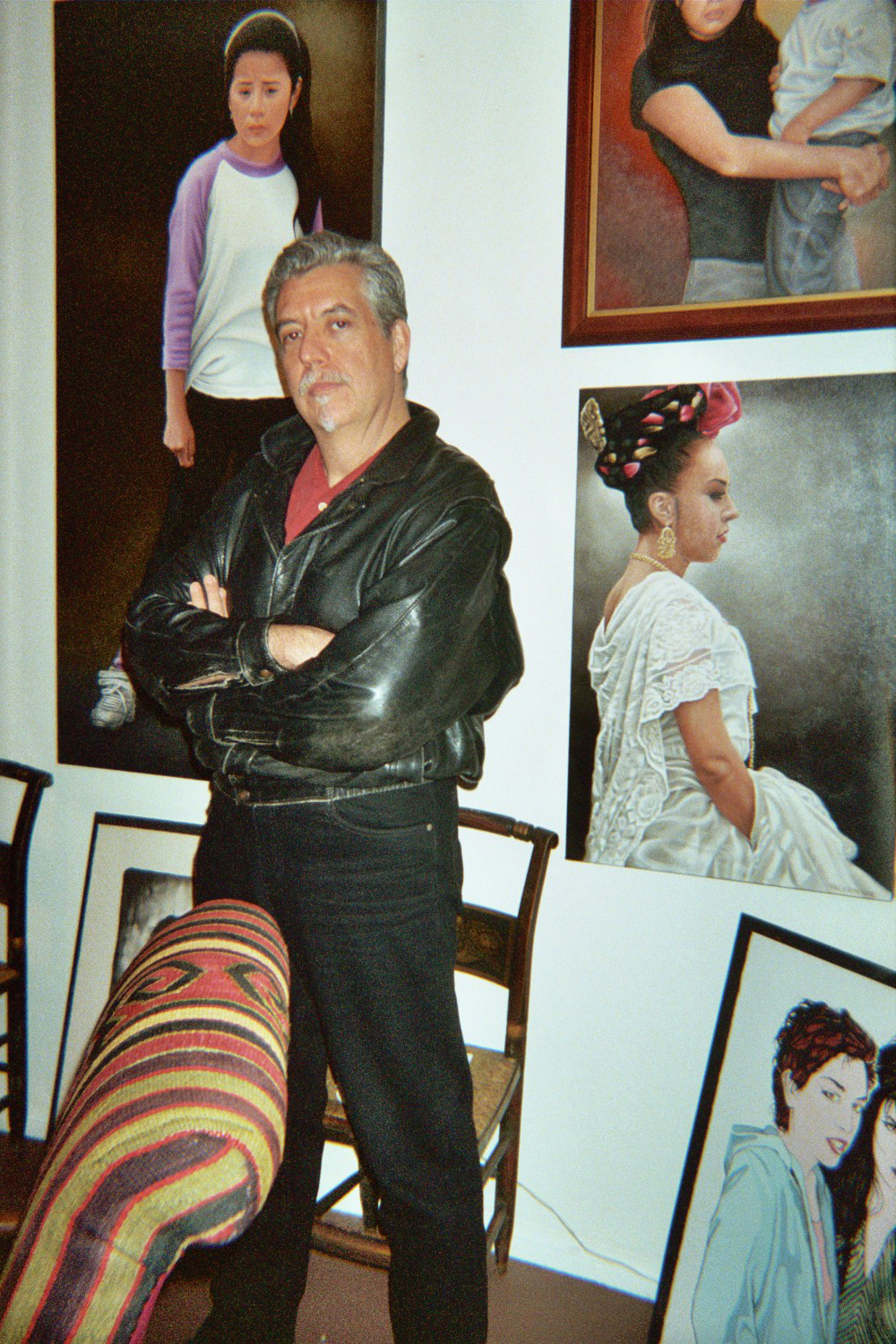
Mark Vallen

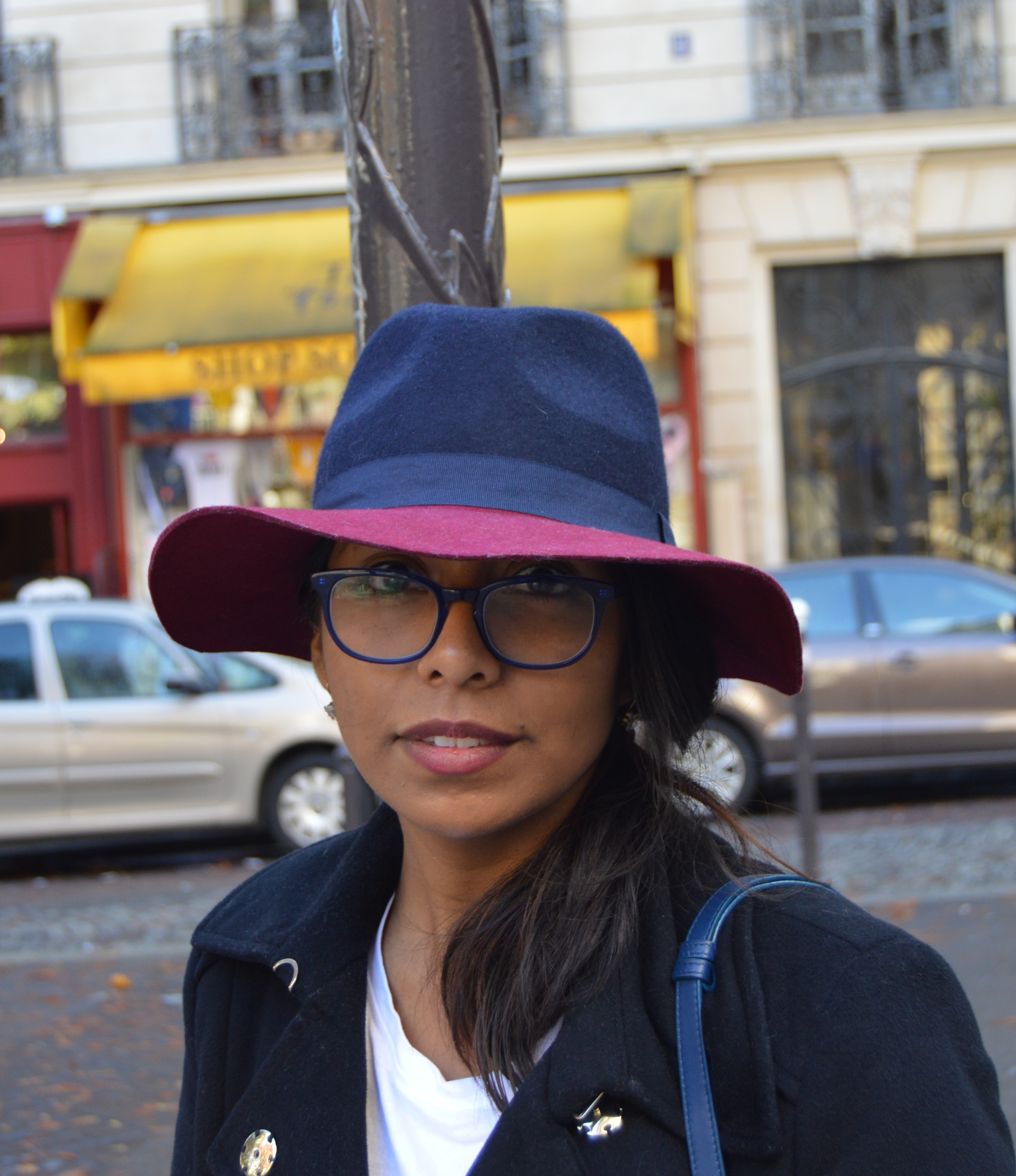
Natalia Anciso

- Manuel Gregorio Acosta (1921–1989) – artist, painter and illustrator
- Lalo Alcaraz (born 1964) – artist, editorial/comic strip cartoonist
- Juana Alicia (born 1953) – artist, painter and activist
- Carlos Almaraz (1941–1989) – street artist and muralist
- Axel Alonso – American comic book creator (in DC Comics from 1994 to 2000, and at Marvel Comics from 2000 to the present).
- Pete Alvarado (1920–2004) – animation and comicbook artist
- Cecilia Alvarez (born 1950) – artist, painter and muralist
- Natalia Anciso (born 1985) – artist and educator
- Sergio Aragonés (born 1937) – cartoonist, writer
- Don Gregorio Antón (born 1956) – artist, photographer and educator
- Alfonso Arana (1927–2005) – artist and painter
- Fortunato Arriola (1827–1872) – artist and painter
- Gus Arriola (1917–2008) – artist and comic Strip cartoonist
- Judy Baca (born 1946) – artist, painter, muralist and activist
- Patrociño Barela (1900–1964) – artist, wood sculptor
- Santa Barraza (born 1951) – artist, painter and activist
- Galo Canote (born 1970) (also known as "Make", "MakeOne" or "LoveGalo") – graffiti artist, painter, muralist and activist
- Mel Casas (1929–2014) – artist, painter and activist
- Ako Castuera (born 1950) – artist who is best known for being a writer and storyboard artist on the animated television series Adventure Time
- Yreina Cervantez (born 1952) – artist, painter, activist and muralist
- Jean Charlot (1898–1979) – painter and illustrator
- Miguel Condé (born 1939) – artist, painter and print-maker
- Peter Coffin (born 1972) – artist and painter
- Salvador Corona (1895–1990) – folk-art style painter
- Enrique Chagoya (born 1953) – artist, painter and print-maker
- Alfredo de Batuc (born 1950) – artist
- Edgar De Evia (1910–2003) – photographer
- Jerry De La Cruz (born 1948) – artist and painter
- Roberto De La Rocha (born 1943) – artist, painter and muralist
- Daniel Martin Diaz (born 1967) – artist and painter
- Richard Dominguez (born 1960) – comic book artist and Illustrator.
- Carlos Dorrien (born 1948) – artist and sculptor
- Rodolfo Escalera (1929–2000) – artist, painter
- Elsa Flores (born 1955) – street artist
- Diane Gamboa (born 1957) – artist and painter
- Harry Gamboa Jr. (born 1951) – performance artist, photographer and essayist
- Carmen Lomas Garza (born 1948) – artist, painter and illustrator
- Guillermo Gómez-Peña (born 1955) – performance artist, author, activist and educator
- David Gonzales (born 1964) – cartoonist
- Gronk (born 1954) – performance artist, painter and print-maker
- Pedro E. Guerrero (1917–2012) – photographer, one of the most sought-after architectural photographers of the 1950s
- Ester Hernandez (born 1944) – artist and painter
- Gilbert Hernandez (born 1957) – cartoonist
- Jaime Hernandez (born 1959) – cartoonist
- Javier Hernandez (born 1966) – comic book artist and radio host
- Judithe Hernández (born 1948) – painter, activist, educator, and public artist
- Mario Hernandez (born 1953) – cartoonist
- Luis Jimenez (1940–2006) – artist and sculptor
- Yolanda Lopez (1942–2021) – artist, painter, print-maker, educator and movie producer
- Gilbert Luján (1940–2011) – artist, painter, muralist and sculptor
- James Luna (1950–2018) – installation artist
- Alex Martinez – graffiti artist, illustrator, muralist
- Xavier Martínez (1869–1943) – artist, painter and teacher
- Bill Melendez (1916–2008) – animator
- Alberto Mijangos (1925–2007) – artist and painter
- Mister Cartoon (born 1970) – tattoo and Graffiti artist
- Laura Molina (born 1957) – artist, painter, muralist, and musician
- Franco Mondini-Ruiz (born 1961) – visual artist
- Rhode Montijo (born 1966) – comic book artist and co-creator of the cartoon Happy Tree Friends.
- Rafael Navarro (born 1967) – comic book artist
- Ray Navarro (1964–1990) – artist, filmmaker, and HIV/AIDS activist
- Manuel Neri (1930–2021)– artist, painter, print-maker and sculptor
- Victor Ochoa (born 1948) – painter, muralist and activist
- Estevan Oriol – photographer and director
- Martín Ramírez (1895–1963) – self-taught artist
- Michael Ramirez (born 1961) – Pulitzer Award-winning cartoonist
- Daniel "Chaka" Ramos (born 1972) – graffiti artist
- Miguel Angel Reyes (born 1964) – artist, painter, print-maker, muralist, Illustrator and Instructor
- Anita Rodriguez (born 1941) – artist and painter
- Isis Rodriguez (born 1964) – contemporary painter
- Carlos Saldaña (born 1997) – comic book artist and comedian
- John August Swanson (1938–2021) – visual artist
- Alberto Valdés (1918–1998) – painter
- Patssi Valdez (born 1951) – painter, artist and activist
- Mark Vallen (born 1953) – artist, figurative realist painter, activist, curator and blogger
- Kathy Vargas (born 1950) – artist and painter
- Rafael Vargas-Suarez (born 1972) – contemporary artist, painter and photographer
- Emigdio Vasquez (1939–2014) – artist and muralist
- Jhonen Vasquez (born 1974) – cartoonist, comic book and author
- Joe Vera (born 1941) – graphic artist
- Esteban Villa (1930–2022) – artist and muralist
- Kat Von D (born 1982) – tattoo artist and TV personality

=== Dance ===
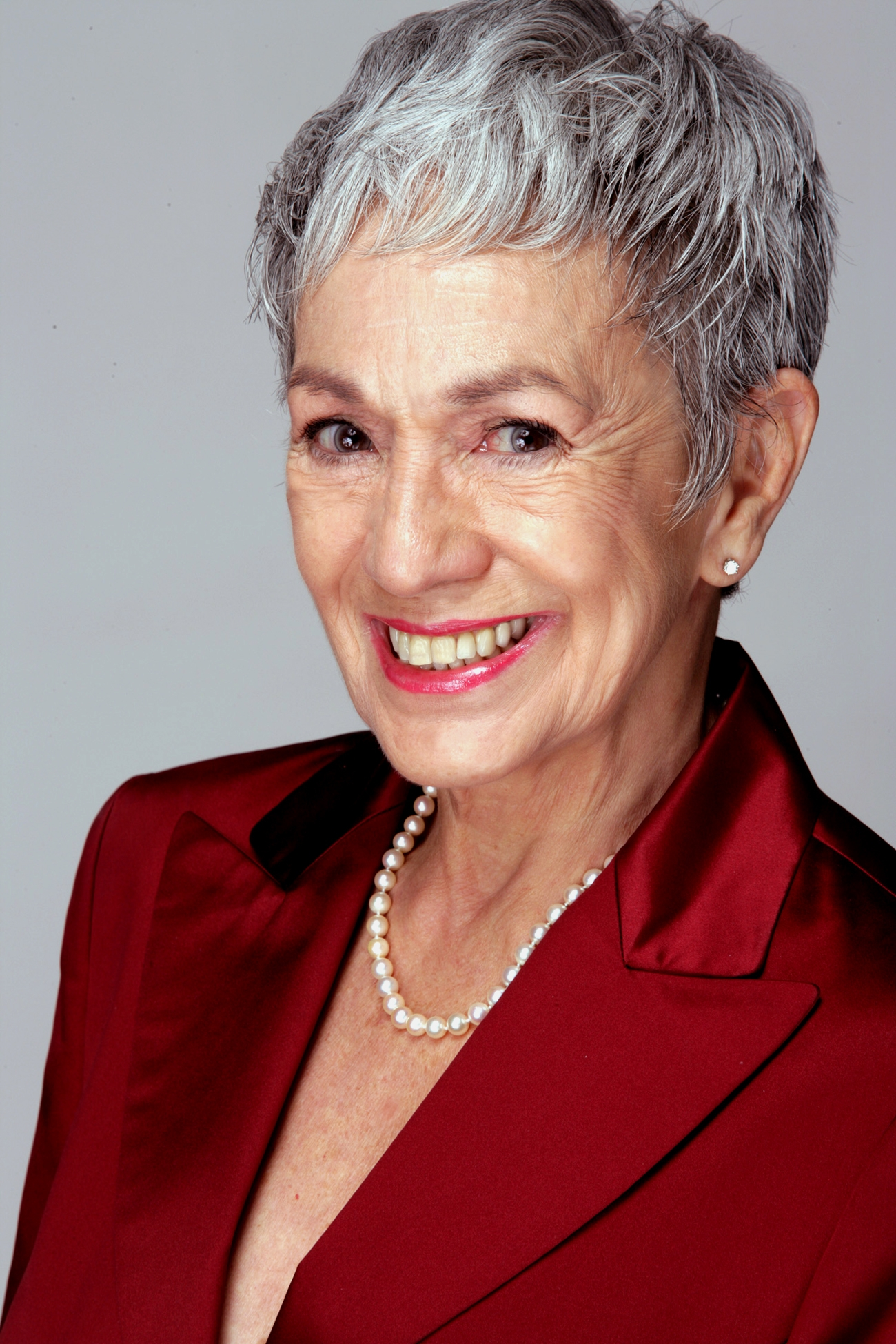
Tina Ramirez

- Michael Balderrama (born 1973) – choreographer, Broadway dancer, and producer
- Corky Ballas (born 1960) – ballroom dancer, holds several Latin dance championship titles
- Mark Ballas (born 1986) – Emmy-nominated choreographer, dancer, and musician
- Evelyn Cisneros (born 1958) – ballerina, instructor
- René Elizondo Jr. (born 1962) – dancer, music video director
- Rosa Ramirez Guerrero (born 1934) – founder of the International Folklorico Dance Group
- Cynthia Harvey (born 1957) – former American Ballet Theatre and Royal Ballet principal dancer, artistic director of Jacqueline Kennedy Onassis School
- Tina Landon (born 1963) – choreographer who has worked with numerous musical performers
- José Limón (1908–1972) – influential dancer and choreographer, active between 1929 and 1969
- Nicholas Magallanes (1922–1977) – principal dancer for the New York City Ballet
- Viktor Manoel (born 1957) – choreographer, writer, and actor
- Tony Meredith (born 1958) – ballroom dancer, choreographer, and US Latin dance Champion
- Tina Ramirez (1929–2022) – dancer and choreographer, founder of Ballet Hispanico, the leading Hispanic dance company in the United States.
- Maclovia Ruiz (1910–2005) – dancer with the San Francisco Ballet in the 1930s
- Eva Tessler (born 1955) – director, playwright, and dancer

=== Drag performers ===
- Adore Delano
- Crystal Methyd
- Delta Work
- Denali
- Jorgeous
- Landon Cider
- Valentina

== Journalists ==
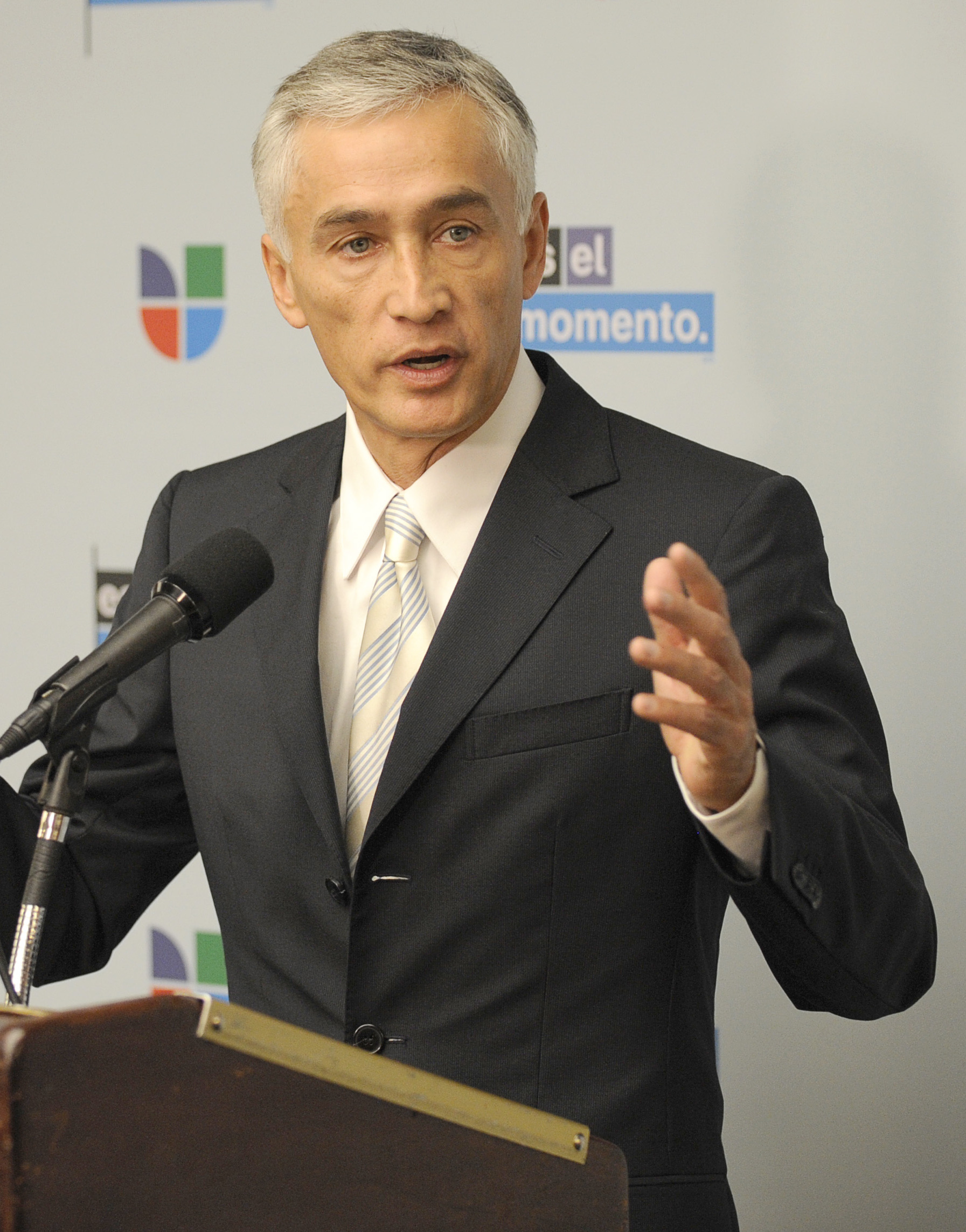
Jorge Ramos

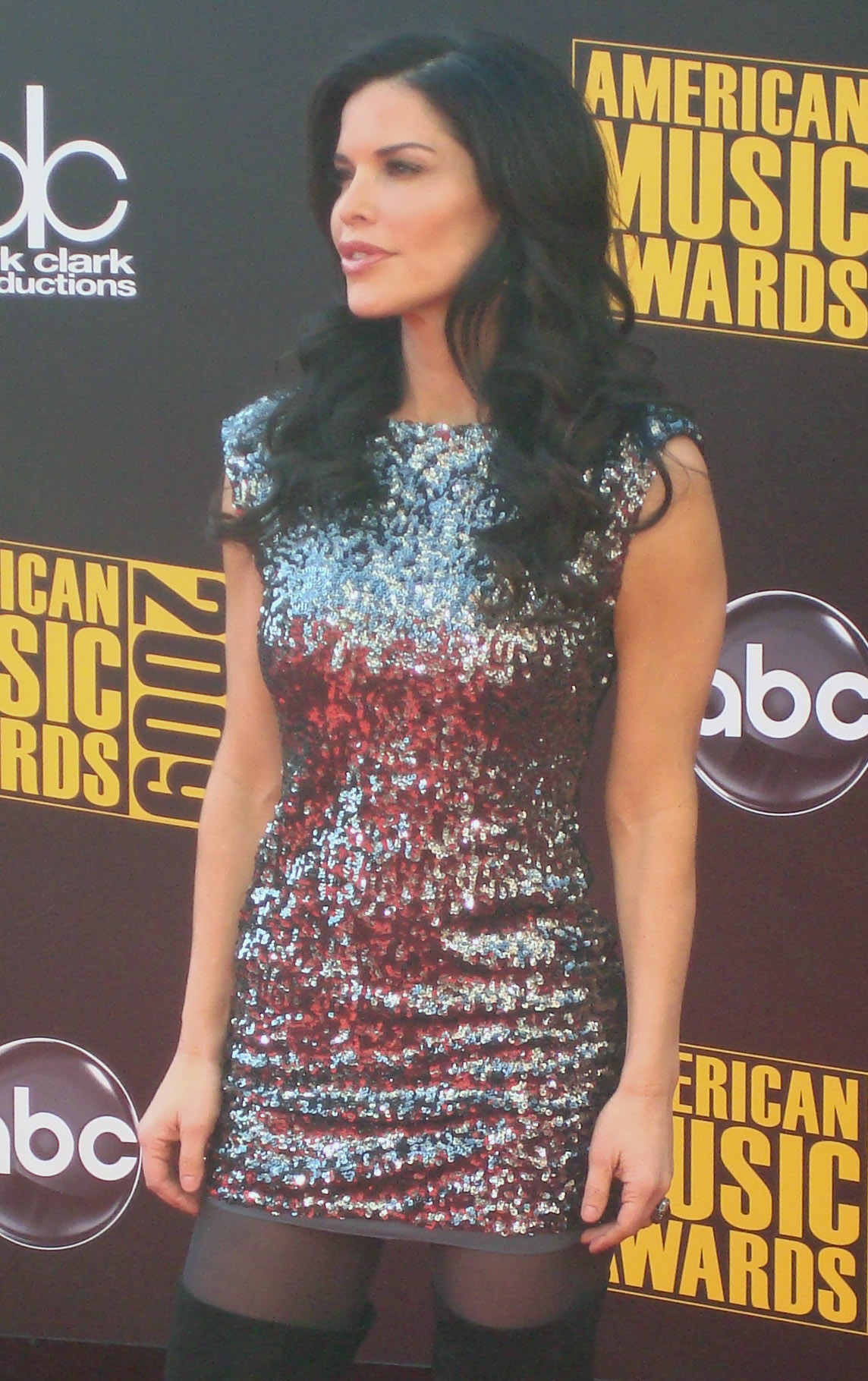
Lauren Sanchez

- Gustavo Arellano (born 1979) – editor at the Los Angeles Times and writer/creator of ¡Ask a Mexican!
- Ron Arias (born 1941) – Chicano writer and correspondent
- Jim Avila – TV journalist and correspondent
- Ana Cabrera (born 1982) – television news anchor
- Ricardo Celis (born 1962) – Spanish language sportscaster
- María Antonieta Collins (born 1952) – TV host, journalist, and author
- Mandalit del Barco – award-winning art and culture reporter for National Public Radio
- Laura Diaz (born 1958) – Southern California newscaster and co-anchor of CBS 2 News
- Giselle Fernández (born 1961) – TV journalist and reporter
- Anselmo L. Figueroa (1861–1915) – journalist and political figure
- John Carlos Frey (born 1969) – investigative journalist
- Luis De La Garza (born 1954) – TV and radio host
- Christy Haubegger (born 1968) – movie producer and founder of Latina Magazine
- Maria Hinojosa (born 1961) – broadcast journalist and correspondent
- Monica C. Lozano (born 1956) – editor, publisher, and CEO of La Opinión, the largest Spanish language newspaper
- Rubén Martínez (writer) (born 1962) – award-winning journalist and author
- Tony Ortega (journalist) (born 1963) – newspaper editor, blogger
- Raul Peimbert (born 1962) – Spanish language TV journalist and newscaster
- John Quiñones (born 1952) – news correspondent, award-winning journalist
- Jorge Ramos (born 1958) – Spanish-language TV news anchor and journalist
- Naibe Reynoso (born 1973) – TV journalist and reporter
- Rubén Salazar (1928–1970) – TV journalist and reporter
- María Elena Salinas (born 1954) – Spanish language TV news anchor and journalist
- Lauren Sánchez (born 1969) – Emmy Award-winning journalist

== Political figures ==
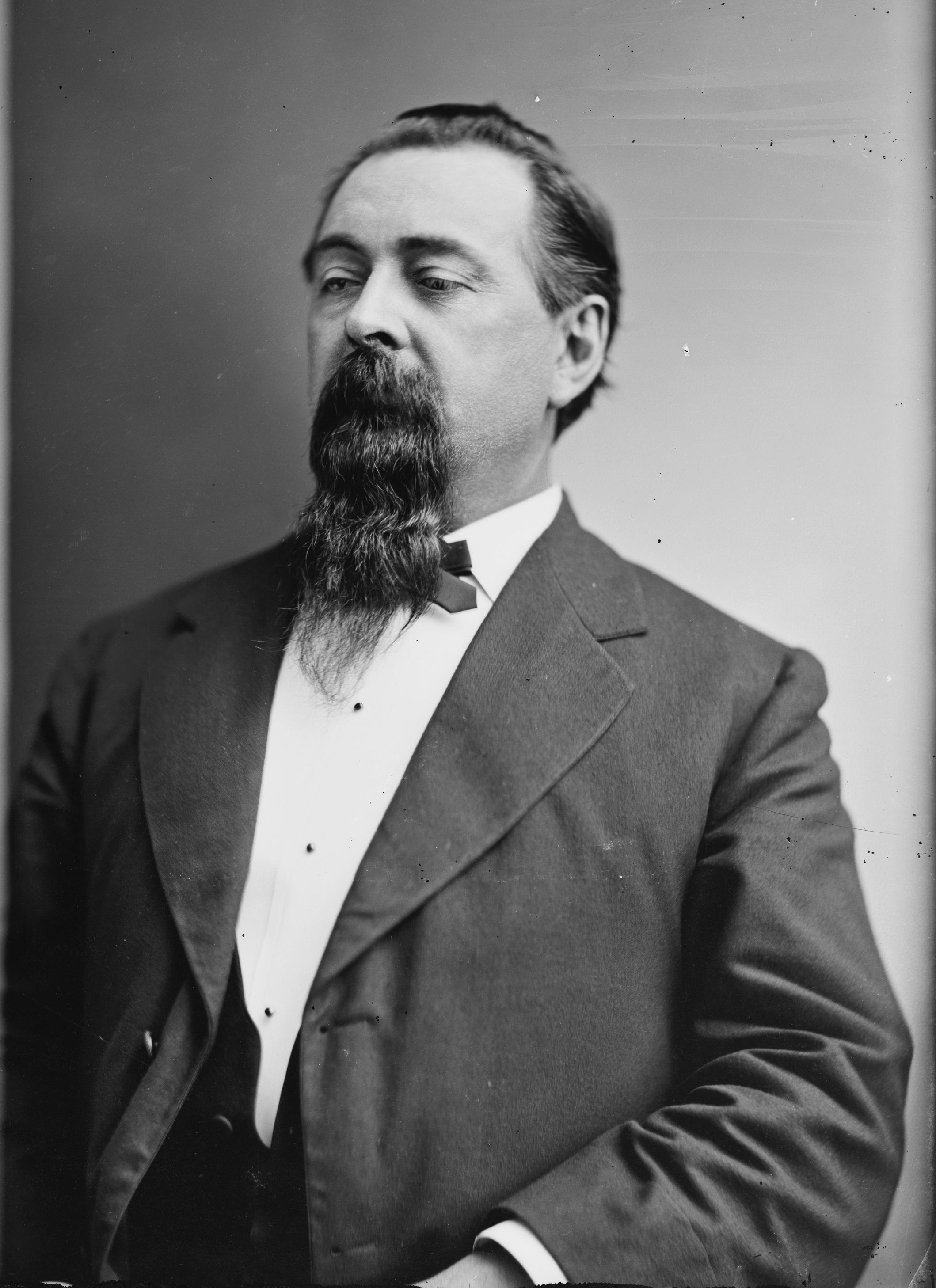
Romualdo Pacheco, Governor of California

Ezequiel Cabeza De Baca, Governor of New Mexico

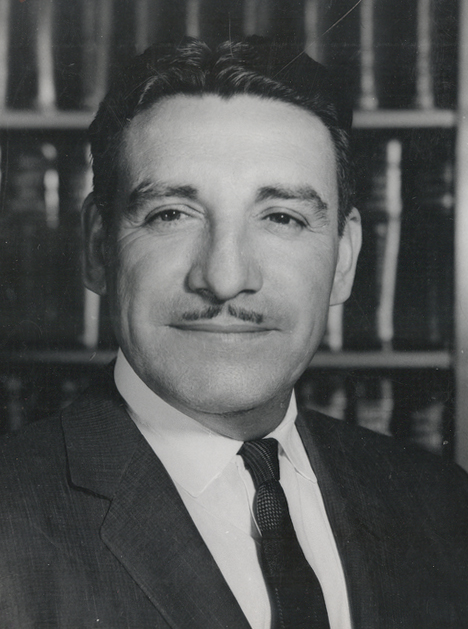
Raúl Castro, Governor of Arizona

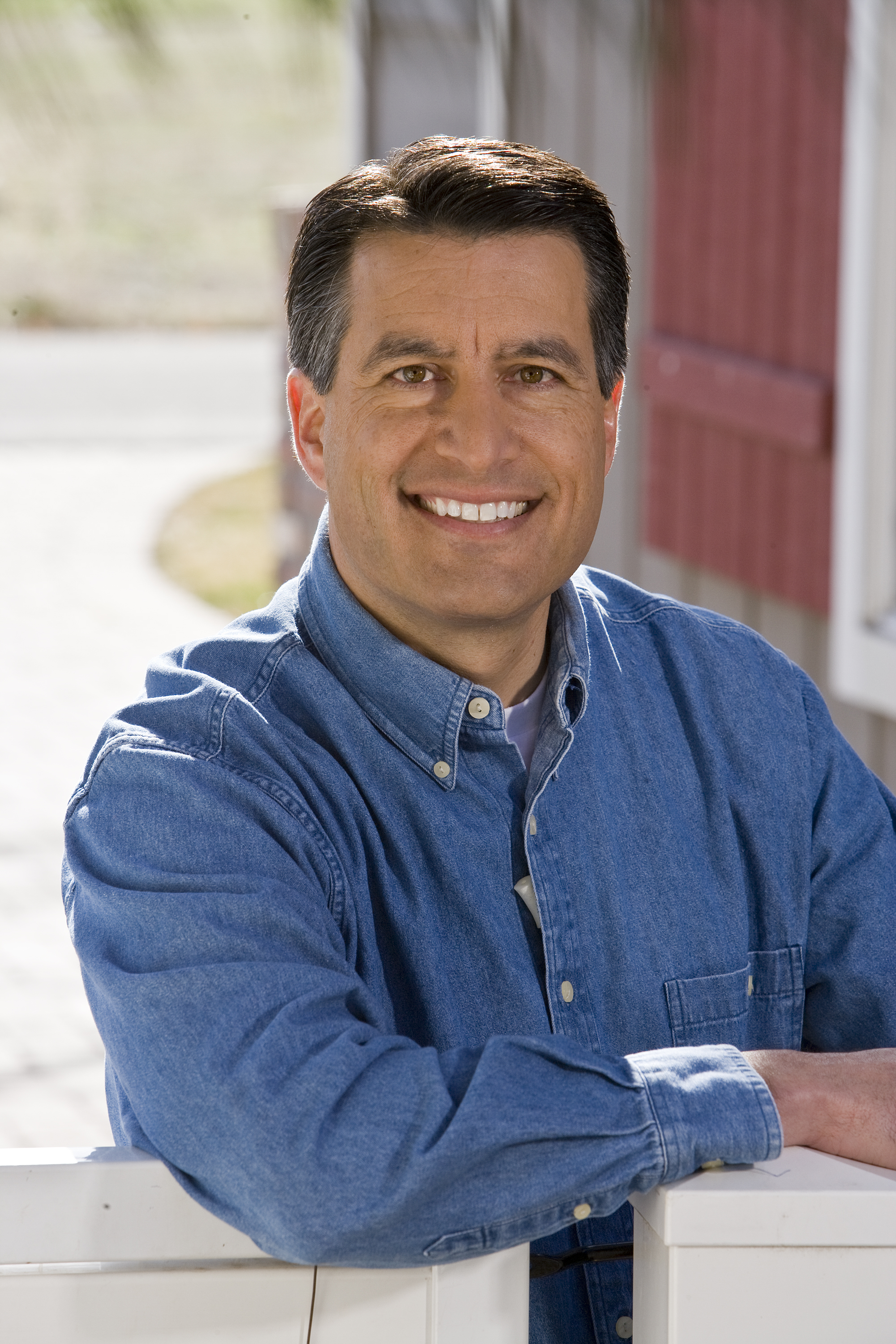
Brian Sandoval, Governor of Nevada

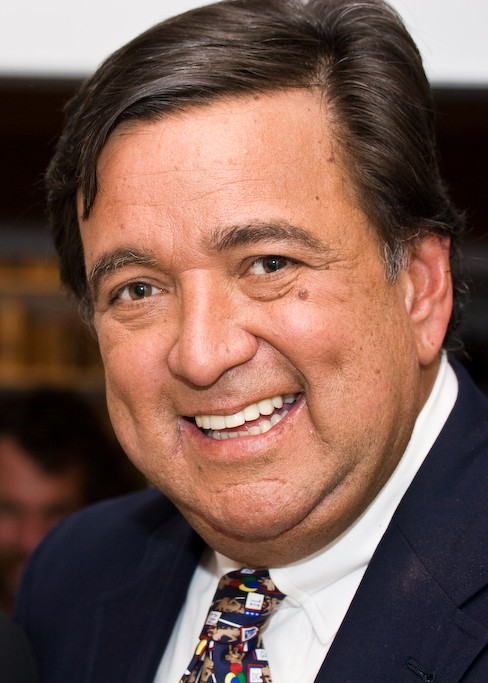
Bill Richardson, U.S. Ambassador to the United Nations and Energy Secretary

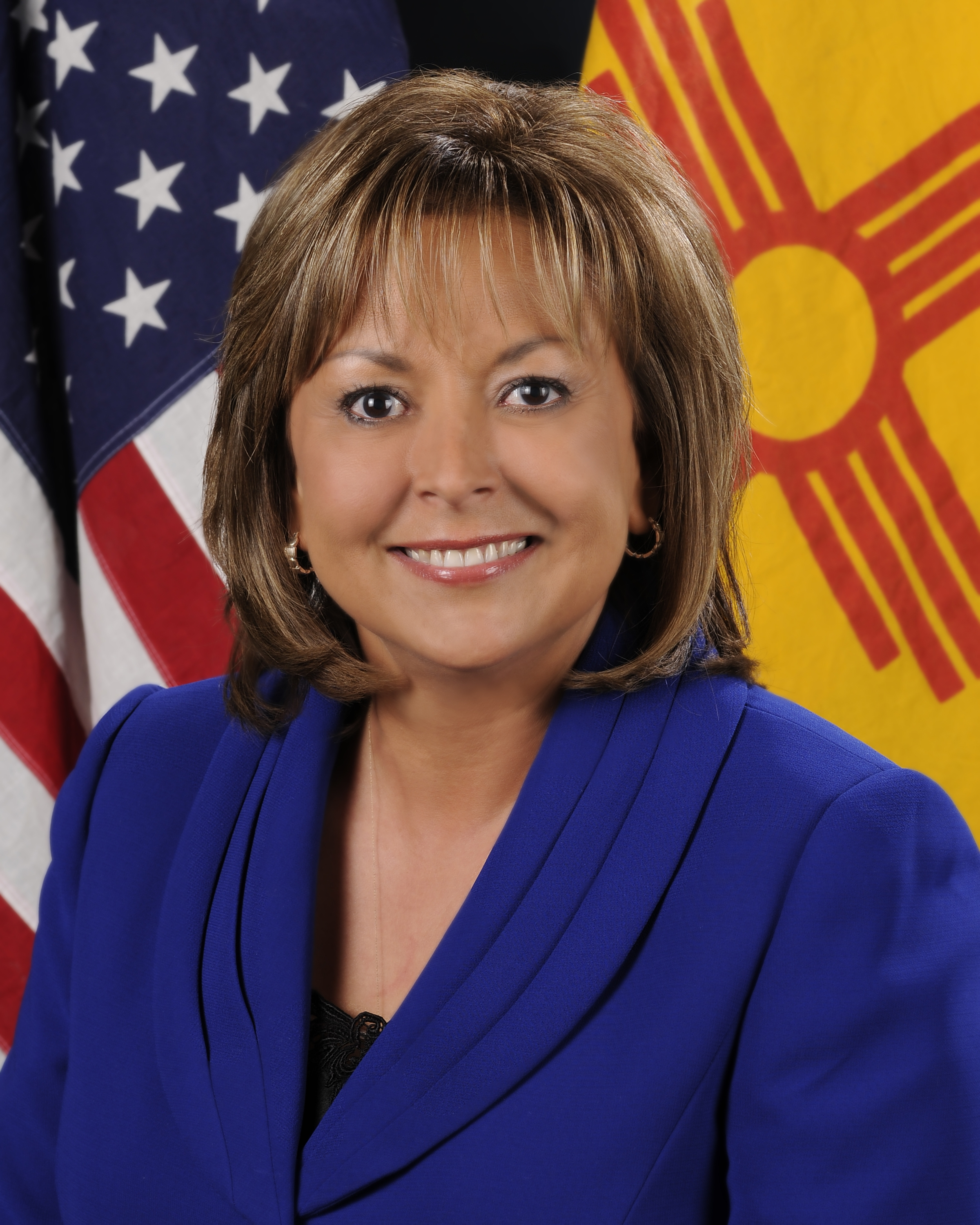
Susana Martinez, first Hispanic female governor in the United States.

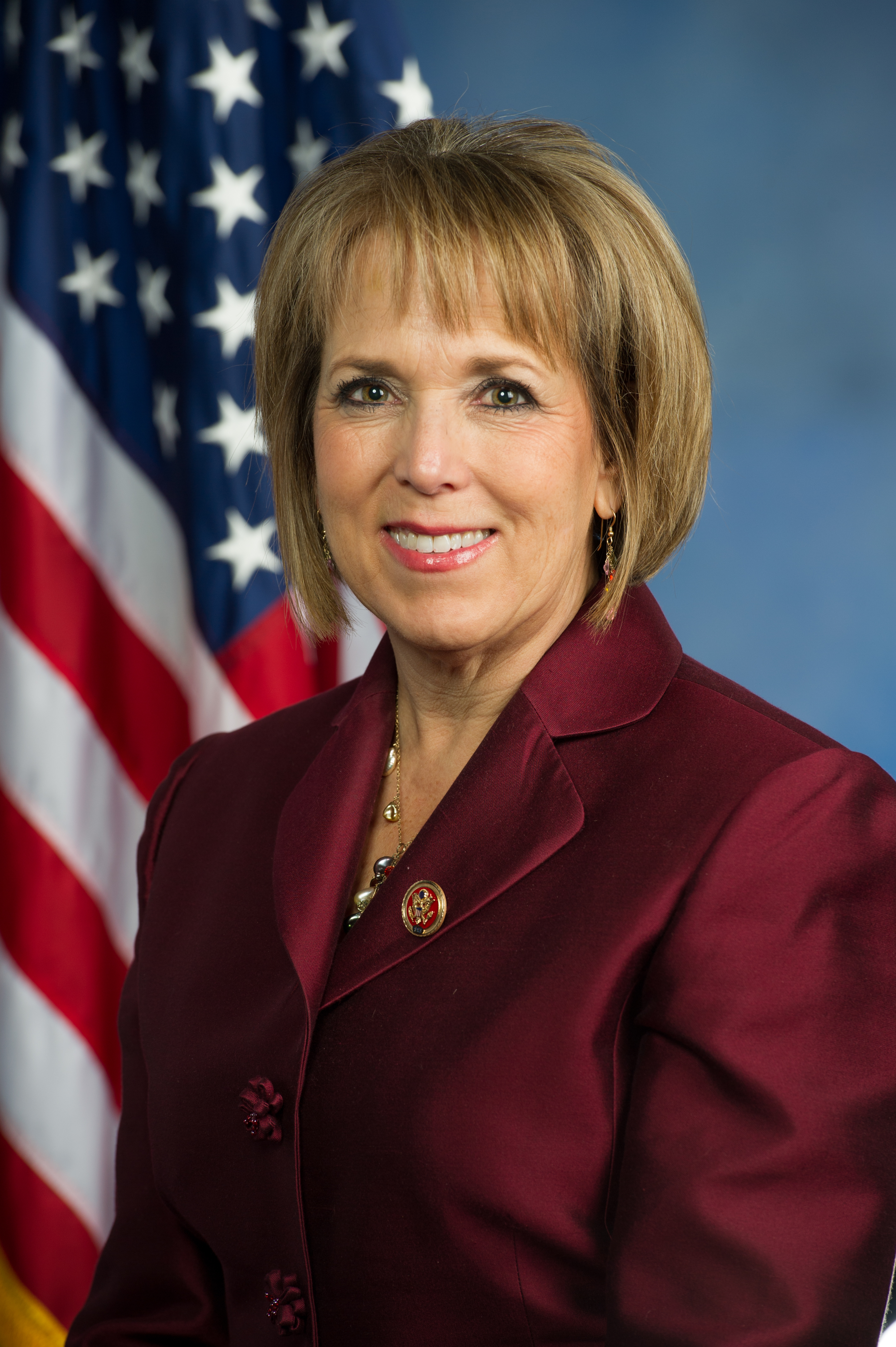
Michelle Lujan Grisham, first Democratic Hispanic female governor

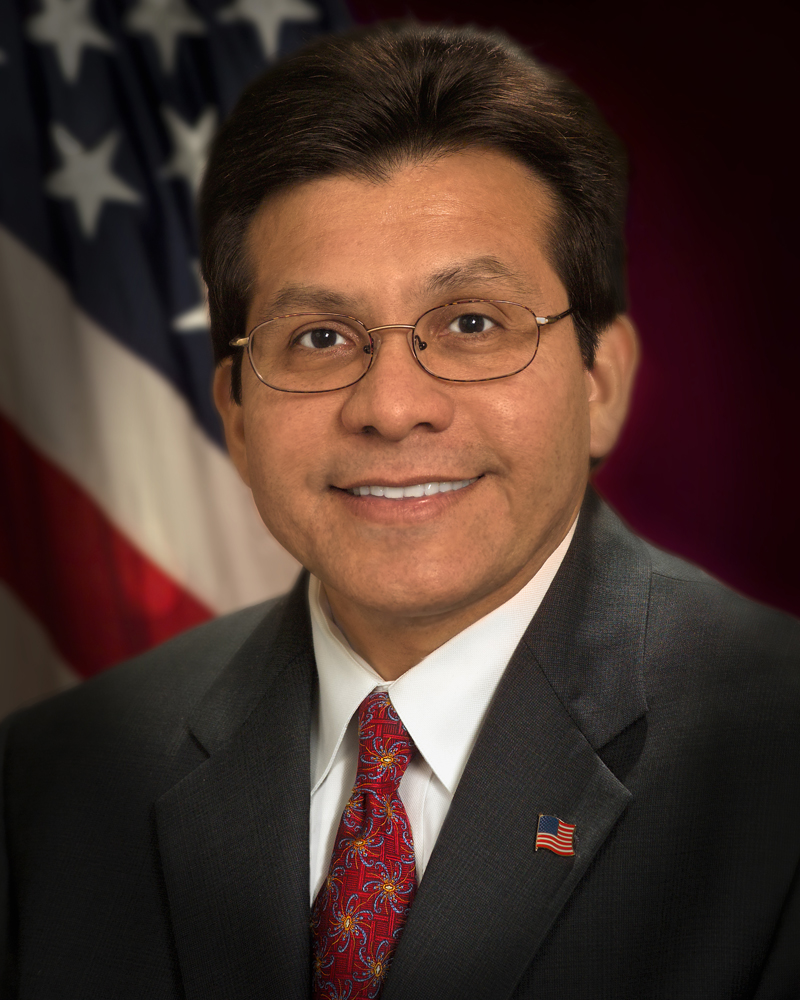
Alberto Gonzales, United States attorney general

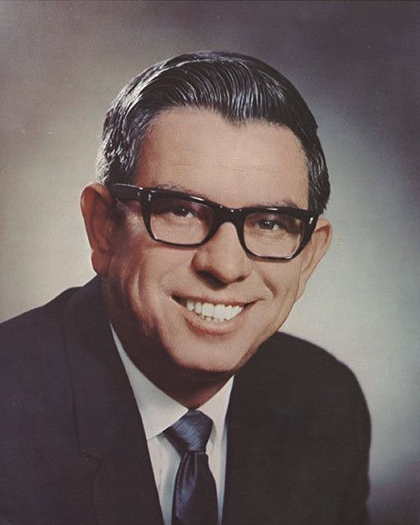
Manuel Lujan Jr.

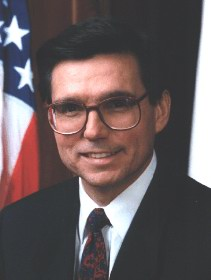
Federico Peña

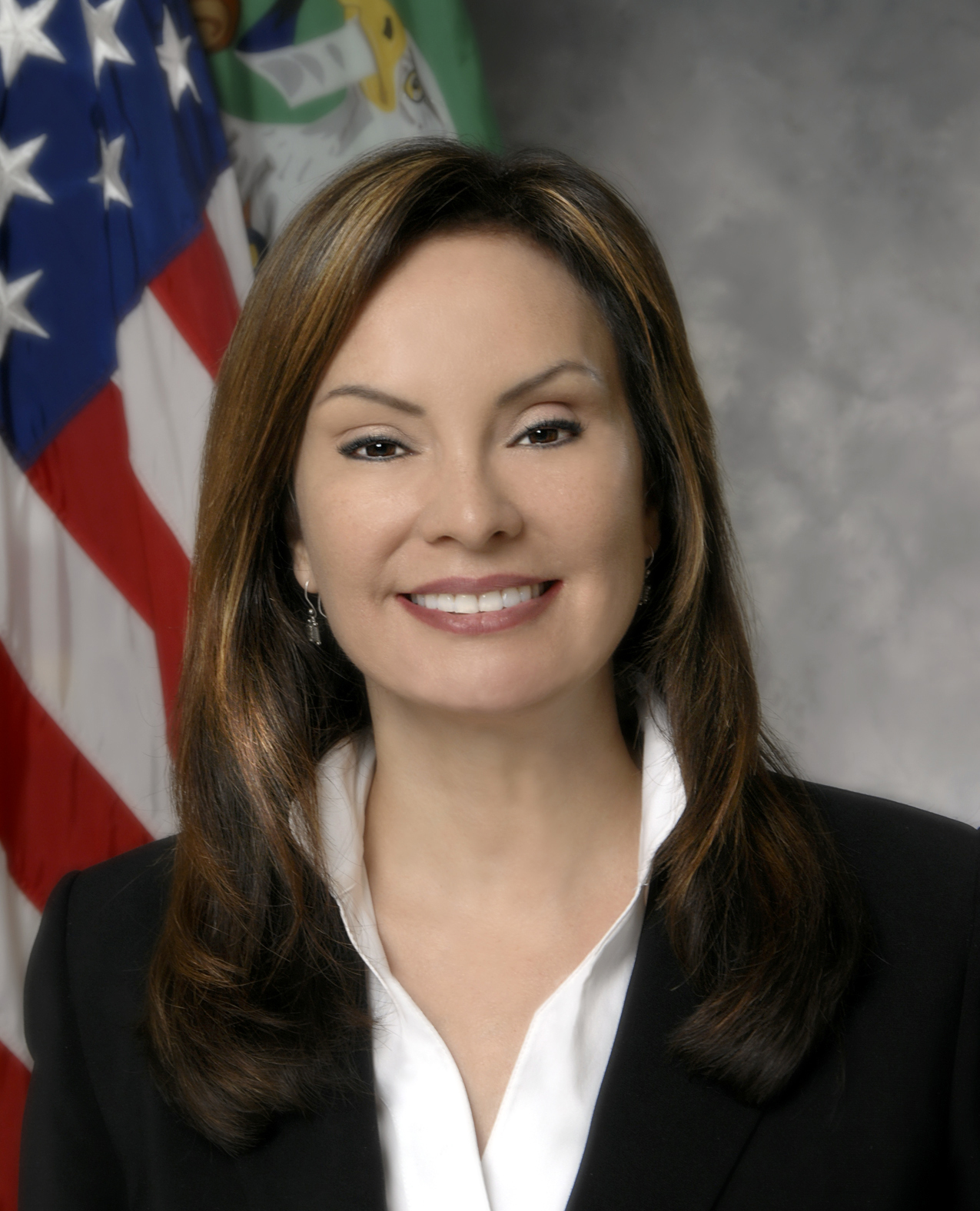
Rosa Rios

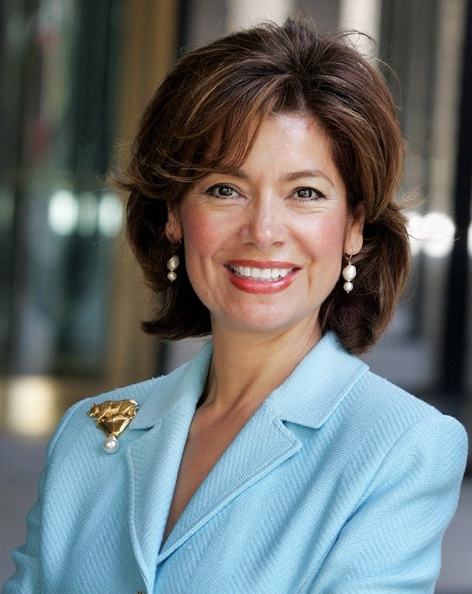
Maria Contreras-Sweet

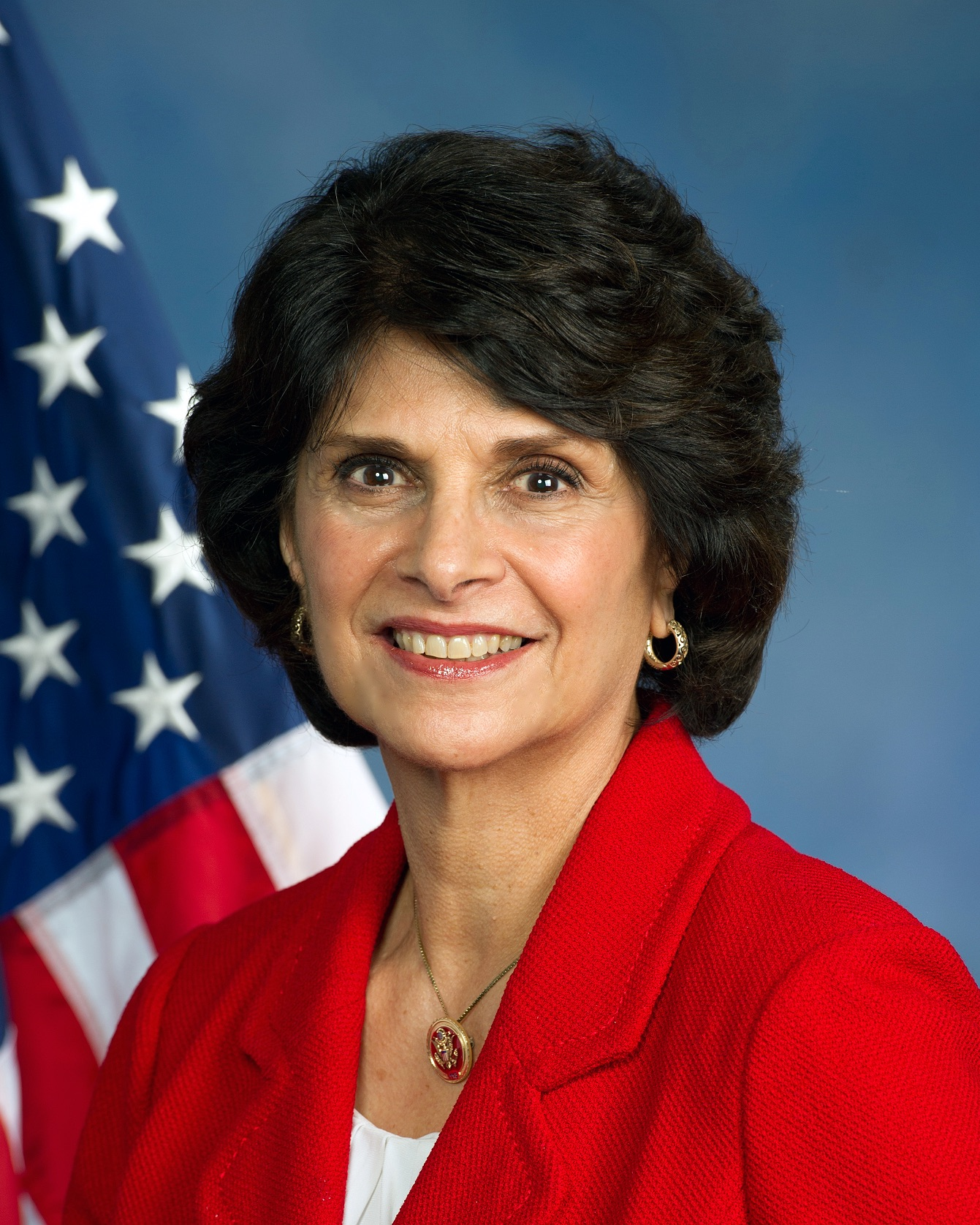
Lucille Roybal-Allard

- Anabel Abarca – former member of the Chicago City Council
- Oscar Zeta Acosta (1935–1974) – politician, attorney, minor novelist and activist
- Adrian Fontes (born 1970) – secretary of state of Arizona
- Bob Archuleta (born 1945) – member of the California State Senate
- Katherine Archuleta (born 1949) – political executive
- Alexander Arvizu (born 1958) – United States Ambassador to Albania from 2010 to 2015
- Cisco Aguilar – secretary of state of Nevada
- Pete Aguilar (born 1979) – U.S. representative from California (CA-31; CA-33), former mayor of Redlands, California
- Amanda Aguirre (born 1953), former member of the Arizona Senate
- Mike Aguirre (born 1949) – former city attorney of San Diego, California
- Lucille Roybal-Allard (born 1941) – former U.S. representative from California (CA-33; CA-34; CA-40), former member of the California State Assembly
- Arturo Alonso (born 1999) – member of the Oklahoma House of Representatives
- Juan Bautista Alvarado (1809–1882) – twice governor of Alta California from 1836 to 1837 and 1838 to 1842
- Toney Anaya (born 1941) – former governor of New Mexico and former Attorney General of New Mexico
- Rafael Anchia (born 1968) – member of the Texas House of Representatives
- Jerry Apodaca (1934–2023) – former governor of New Mexico former Chair of the President's Council on Physical Fitness and Sports
- Jesse Arreguin (born 1984) – mayor of Berkeley, California
- Ruben Ayala (1922–2012) – former member of the California Senate, former mayor of Chino, California
- Joe Baca (born 1947) – former U.S. congressman from California and former member of both the California Senate and the California State Assembly
- Joe Baca Jr. (born 1969) – former California State Assembly member
- José Baca (1876–1924) – former Lieutenant Governor of New Mexico
- Polly Baca (born 1941) – served as chair of the Democratic Caucus of the Colorado House of Representatives, former member of the Colorado Senate
- Hector Balderas (born 1973) – former attorney general of New Mexico, former New Mexico State Auditor, and former member of the New Mexico House of Representatives
- Romana Acosta Bañuelos (1925–2018) – former Treasurer of the United States
- Nanette Barragán (born 1976) – U.S. representative from California (CA-44)
- Rosemary Barkett (born 1939) – former chief justice of the Florida Supreme Court, former Judge on the United States Court of Appeals for the Eleventh Circuit
- Xavier Becerra (born 1958) – former U.S. secretary of health and human services, former attorney general of California, former U.S. representative (CA-31), former California State Assembly member
- Gina M. Benavides (born 1962) – justice at the Texas Thirteenth Court of Appeals
- Joseph Bernal (born 1927) – Texas state representative
- Jaime Herrera Beutler (born 1978) – former U.S. representative (WA-3), former member of the Washington House of Representatives
- Rosilicie Ochoa Bogh (born 1970) – member of the California Senate
- Henry Bonilla (born 1954) – former U.S. congressman from Texas
- Susan Bonilla (born 1960) – former California State Assembly member, Contra Costa County, California Board of Supervisors member
- Flavio Bravo – member of the Arizona Senate
- Columba Bush (born 1953) – former First Lady of Florida
- George P. Bush (born 1976) – former land commissioner of Texas, son of Jeb Bush
- Albert Bustamante (1935–2021) – former U.S. congressman from Texas
- Cruz Bustamante (born 1953) – former lieutenant governor of California, former speaker of the California State Assembly
- Ezequiel Cabeza de Baca (1864–1917) – former governor of New Mexico and former Lieutenant Governor of New Mexico
- Anna Escobedo Cabral (born 1959) – 42nd treasurer of the United States
- Louis Caldera (born 1956) – former U.S. secretary of the Army, former member of the California State Assembly
- Kiki Camarena (1947–1985) – undercover agent for the U.S. Drug Enforcement Administration
- Yadira Caraveo (born 1980) – former U.S. congresswoman from Colorado (CO-8), former member of the Colorado House of Representatives
- Jovita Carranza (born 1949) – former administrator of the Small Business Administration, former deputy administrator of the Small Business Administration, former treasurer of the United States
- Quico Canseco (born 1949) – former U.S. representative from Texas
- Salud Carbajal (born 1964) – U.S. representative from California (CA-24)
- George Cardenas (born 1964) – member of the Cook County Board of Review, former member of the Chicago City Council
- Tony Cárdenas (born 1963) – former U.S. representative from California (CA-29), former member of the Los Angeles City Council, former California State Assembly member
- Carlos Antonio Carrillo (1783–1852) – Gobernador of Alta California (1837–1838); his father, José Raimundo Carrillo, came from Loreto, Mexico
- José Antonio Carrillo (1796–1862) – Californio ranchero, official and politician; brother of Carlos Antonio Carrillo
- Juan Carrillo – member of the California State Assembly
- Juan José Carrillo (1842–1916) – first mayor of Santa Monica, California
- Greg Casar (born 1989) – U.S. representative from Texas (TX-35), former member of the Austin City Council
- Jose L. Castaneda – member of the North Dakota House of Representatives
- Rubén Castillo (born 1954) – chief judge of the United States District Court for the Northern District of Illinois
- Carlos Cascos (born 1952) – former secretary of state of Texas
- Joaquin Castro (born 1974) – U.S. representative from Texas (TX-20), former member of the Texas House of Representatives
- José Castro (California, 1808 – February 1860) – acting governor of Alta California in 1835–1836, and Comandante General of the Mexican army in Alta California at the time of the 1846 Bear Flag Revolt and the Mexican–American War of 1846–1848
- Julian Castro (born 1974) – former mayor of San Antonio, former U.S. secretary of housing and urban development, former member of the San Antonio City Council and 2020 U.S. presidential candidate
- Raul Hector Castro (1916–2015) – former governor of Arizona, former U.S. ambassador to Argentina, Bolivia, and El Salvador
- Lauro Cavazos (1927–2022) – United States secretary of education
- Gabe Cazares (1920–2006) – former mayor of Clearwater, Florida
- José Francisco Chaves (1833–1904) – former delegate from the Territory of New Mexico
- Cesar Chavez (born 1987) – former member of the Arizona House of Representatives
- Dennis Chávez (1888–1962) – U.S. senator and gongressman from New Mexico
- Tibo J. Chávez (1912–1991) – former lieutenant governor of New Mexico and member of the New Mexico Senate
- Juan Ciscomani (born 1982) – U.S. representative from Arizona (AZ-6)
- Gil Cisneros (born 1971) – U.S. Congressman from California (CA-39; CA-31), former under secretary of defense for personnel and readiness
- Henry Cisneros (born 1947) – former Secretary of Housing and Urban Development and mayor of San Antonio, Texas
- Mark Cisneros – member of the Iowa House of Representatives
- Bob Coffin – former member of both the Nevada Senate and the Nevada Assembly
- Frank Coombs (1853–1934) – former U.S. congressman from California, former US ambassador to Japan, former Speaker of the California State Assembly
- Patty Contreras – member of the Arizona House of Representatives
- Antonio F. Coronel – former mayor of Los Angeles, former Los Angeles County Assessor, former California State Treasurer
- Lou Correa (born 1958) – U.S. representative from California (CA-46), former member of both the California Senate and the California State Assembly, and former member of the Orange County Board of Supervisors
- Catherine Cortez Masto (born 1964) – U.S. Senator from Nevada, former Nevada Attorney General
- Joe Coto (born 1939) – member of the California State Assembly
- Jose Cruz (Oklahoma politician) – former member of the Oklahoma House of Representatives
- Mónica De La Cruz (born 1975) – U.S. representative from Texas (TX-15)
- Ruth Cruz (born 1983 or 1984) – member of the Chicago City Council
- Henry Cuellar (born 1955) – U.S. House of Representatives Texas's 28th congressional district, former secretary of state of Texas, former member of the Texas House of Representatives
- Mariano-Florentino Cuéllar (born 1972) – former associate justice of the Supreme Court of California
- Mike Curb (born 1944) – former lieutenant governor of California
- Gonzalo P. Curiel (born 1953) – judge of the United States District Court for the Southern District of California
- Alessandro Cutrona – member of the Ohio House of Representatives
- Billy Dalto (born 1976) – former member of the Oregon House of Representatives
- James DeAnda (1925–2006) – former judge of the United States District Court for the Southern District of Texas, attorney, noted for his activities in defense of Hispanic civil rights, particularly as a plaintiff's attorney in Hernandez v. Texas.
- Ignacio De La Fuente (born 1949) – former vice mayor of Oakland, member of the Oakland City Council
- Pablo de la Guerra (1819–1874) – former acting lieutenant governor of California member of the California State Senate
- Antonio Delgado – lieutenant governor of New York, former U.S. congressman from New York (NY-19)
- Ygnacio del Valle (1808–1880) – member of the Los Angeles Common Council (1852, 1856), California state assemblyman (1852–1853), mayor of Los Angeles (1850)
- Lori Chavez-DeRemer (born 1968) – former U.S. Secretary of Labor, former U.S. congresswoman from Oregon (OR-5), former mayor of Happy Valley, Oregon
- Leonora Dodge – state legislator in Vermont
- Rosalba Dominguez – state legislator in Utah
- Elena J. Duarte (born 1966) – associate justice of the California Court of Appeal
- Maria Elena Durazo (born 1953) – member of the California Senate
- Luz Escamilla (born 1978) – member of the Utah Senate
- Veronica Escobar (born 1969) – U.S. representative from Texas (TX-16)
- Gabe Evans – U.S. congressman from Colorado (CO-8); former member of the Colorado House of Representatives
- Antonio M. Fernández (1902–1956) – former U.S. congressman from New Mexico
- Ben Fernandez (1925–2000) – politician, financial consultant and special ambassador; ran for president in 1980, 1984 and 1988, making him America's first major-party presidential contender of Hispanic origin
- Teresa Leger Fernandez (born 1959) – U.S. representative from New Mexico (NM-3)
- Marco Antonio Firebaugh (1966–2006) – former California State Assembly member
- Edgar Flores (politician) (born 1986) – member of the Nevada Senate, and former member of the Nevada Assembly
- Mayra Flores (born 1986) – former U.S. representative from Texas (TX-34)
- Soñia Galaviz – member of the Idaho House of Representatives
- José Manuel Gallegos (1815–1875) – former delegate from the Territory of New Mexico
- Mario Gallegos Jr. (1950–2012) – former member of both the Texas Senate and the Texas House of Representatives
- Pete Gallego (born 1961) – former U.S. representative (TX-23), former member of the Texas House of Representatives
- Ruben Gallego (born 1979) – U.S. senator from Arizona, former U.S. representative (AZ-7), former member of the Arizona House of Representatives
- Tony Gallegos (1924–2018) – chairman of the Equal Employment Opportunity Commission
- Cristina Garcia – former California State Assembly member
- Joseph Garcia (born 1957) – former Lieutenant Governor of Colorado
- Jesus "Chuy" Garcia (born 1956) – U.S. representative from Illinois (IL-4), former member of the Cook County Board of Commissioners, former member of Illinois Senate, former member of the Chicago City Council, mayoral candidate for the city of Chicago
- Jorge Luis Garcia (1953–2010), former member of the Arizona Senate
- Mike Garcia (born 1976) – former U.S. congressman from California (CA-25; CA-27)
- Sylvia Garcia (born 1950) – U.S. representative from Texas (TX-29), former member of the Texas Senate
- Ruben Garcia Jr. (born 1951) – former executive assistant director of the FBI
- Eric Garcetti (born 1971) – U.S. ambassador to India, former mayor of Los Angeles, former president of the Los Angeles City Council
- Gil Garcetti (born 1941) – former Los Angeles County district attorney
- Edward D. Garza (born 1969) – former mayor San Antonio, Texas and former member of the San Antonio City Council
- Margarito C. Garza (1931–1995) – district judge, comic book creator
- Antonio María de la Guerra (1825–1891) – Mayor of Santa Barbara, California (1856–1858, 1859–1864) – California state senator
- José Antonio de la Garza (1776–1851?) – mayor of San Antonio, Texas (in 1813 and 1832), the first landowner in San Antonio and the first man to create a coin in this state
- Kika de la Garza (1927–2017) – former U.S. congressman from Texas, former member of the Texas House of Representatives
- Reynaldo Guerra Garza (1915–2004) – first Hispanic judge appointed to the U.S. Court of Appeals (Fifth Circuit), former judge on the United States District Court for the Southern District of Texas
- Tony Garza (born 1959) – former U.S. ambassador to Mexico, former secretary of state of Texas, former member of the Texas Railroad Commission
- Victor Gordo (born 1969) – mayor of Pasadena, California
- Jimmy Gomez (born 1974) – U.S. representative from California (CA-34), former California State Assembly member
- Alberto Gonzales (born 1955) – former United States attorney general, former White House counsel, former justice on the Supreme Court of Texas, former secretary of state of Texas
- Rafael Gonzales (1789–1857) – native of San Antonio, Texas, governor of Coahuila and Texas
- Ron Gonzales (born 1951) – former mayor of San José, California
- Tony Gonzales (born 1980) – former U.S. representative from Texas (TX-23)
- Cecelia González – member of the Nevada Assembly
- Charlie González (born 1945) – former U.S. representative (Texas)
- Edgar Gonzalez Jr. (born 1996) – member of the Illinois House of Representatives
- Henry González (1916–2000) – former U.S. representative (Texas)
- Irma Elsa Gonzalez (born 1948) – former judge of the United States District Court for the Southern District of California
- Lena Gonzalez (born 1981) – member of the California Senate
- Matt Gonzalez (born 1965) – former president of the San Francisco Board of Supervisors
- Ramon Gonzalez Jr. (born 1947) – former member of the Kansas House of Representatives
- Steven Gonzalez (born 1963) – chief justice of the Washington Supreme Court
- Vicente Gonzalez (born 1967) – U.S. representative from Texas (TX-15; TX-34)
- Adelita Grijalva (born 1970) – U.S. representative (AZ-7), former Pima County Board of Supervisors
- Raúl Grijalva (1948–2025) – Former U.S. representative (AZ-3; AZ-7)
- Michelle Lujan Grisham (born 1959) – Ggvernor of New Mexico and former U.S. representative (NM-1)
- Patricia Guerrero (born 1971) – chief justice of California, former associate justice of the California Supreme Court, former associate justice of the California Court of Appeal, former judge of the San Diego County Superior Court
- Yanira Gurrola, member of the New Mexico House of Representatives
- Jeylú Gutiérrez (born 1987/1988) – member of the Chicago City Council
- Philip S. Gutierrez (born 1959) – judge of the United States District Court for the Central District of California
- Eva Guzman (born 1961) – former member of the Supreme Court of Texas
- Isabel Guzman (born 1970 or 1971) – administrator of the Small Business Administration
- Lucía Guzmán (born 1945) – former member of the Colorado Senate
- Ana Hernandez (born 1978) – member of the Texas House of Representatives
- Benigno C. Hernandez (1862–1954) – former Congressman from New Mexico
- Eunisses Hernandez (born 1990) – member of the Los Angeles City Council
- Melody Hernandez – member of the Arizona House of Representatives
- Norma Hernandez – member of the Illinois House of Representatives
- Roger Hernández (born 1975) – former mayor of West Covina, California, former California State Assembly member
- Tim Hernández (born 1997) – member of the Colorado House of Representatives
- Rubén Hinojosa (born 1940) – former U.S. representative from Texas (TX-15)
- Ben Hueso (born 1969) – former member of both the California Senate and the California State Assembly, former member of the San Diego City Council
- Jose Huizar (born 1968) – former member of the Los Angeles City Council
- Lilian Jiménez – member of the Illinois House of Representatives
- Michael Brooks-Jimenez – member of the Oklahoma Senate
- Debora Juarez – former president of the Seattle City Council
- Rubén Kihuen (born 1980) – former U.S. representative from Nevada (NV-4), former member of both the Nevada Senate and the Nevada Assembly
- Ricardo Lara (born 1977) – California Insurance Commissioner, former member of both the California Senate and the California State Assembly
- Octaviano Ambrosio Larrazolo (1859–1930) – former Governor of New Mexico and first Latino to serve United States Senate
- Idalia Lechuga-Tena – former member of the New Mexico House of Representatives
- Oscar Leeser (born 1958) – Mayor of El Paso (2013–2017, 2021–2025)
- Teresa Alonso Leon (born 1975) – former member of the Oregon House of Representatives
- Mike Levin (born 1978) – U.S. Representative from California (CA-49)
- Sam Liccardo (born 1970) – U.S. representative from California (CA-16), former mayor of San Jose, California and former member of the San Jose City Council
- Kevin Lincoln (born 1980) – mayor of Stockton, California
- Carmen Lomellin (born 1950) – former U.S. ambassador to the Organization of American States
- Greg Lopez (born 1964) – former U.S. Congressman from Colorado (CO-4)
- Janie Lopez – member of the Texas House of Representatives
- Marco A. López Jr. (born 1978) – Chief of Staff of U.S. Customs and Border Protection (2009–2011), Director of the Arizona Department of Commerce (2008–2009), Mayor of Nogales, Arizona (2001–2004)
- Patty López (born 1968) – member of the San Fernando, California City Council, former member of the California State Assembly
- Anthony Loubet – member of the Utah House of Representatives
- J. M. Lozano (born 1980) – member of the Texas House of Representatives
- Eric Lucero (born 1977 or 1978) – member of the Minnesota Senate, former member of the Minnesota House of Representatives
- Ben Ray Luján (born 1972) – U.S. Senator from New Mexico, former U.S. representative from New Mexico (NM-3)
- Manuel Lujan Jr. (1928–2019) – U.S. representative from New Mexico
- Anna Paulina Luna (born 1989) – first Mexican-American U.S. representative from Florida (FL-13)
- Casey Luna (born 1931) – former Lieutenant Governor of New Mexico
- Tranquilino Luna (1849–1892) – former delegate from the Territory of New Mexico
- Roberto de la Madrid (1922–2010) – governor of Baja California
- Abel Maldonado (born 1967) – 47th Lieutenant Governor of California, former member of both the California Senate and the California State Assembly
- Francisco Antonio Manzanares (1843–1904) – former delegate from the Territory of New Mexico
- Rosario Marin (born 1958) – 41st Treasurer of the United States, former mayor of Huntington Park, California
- Marina Marmolejo (born 1971) – judge of the United States District Court for the Southern District of Texas
- Catherine Cortez Masto (born 1964) – U.S. Senator from Nevada, former Attorney General of Nevada
- Diane Martinez (born 1953) – former member of the California State Assembly
- Hugo Soto-Martinez – member of the Los Angeles City Council
- Matthew G. Martinez (1929–2011) – former U.S. Congressman from California, former member of the California State Assembly
- Nury Martinez (born 1973) – former president of the Los Angeles City Council
- Susana Martinez (born 1959) – former governor of New Mexico
- Brian Mast (born 1980) – U.S. representative (FL-18; FL-21)
- Gloria Negrete McLeod (born 1941) – former U.S. congresswoman from California, former member of both the California Senate and the California State Assembly
- Harold Medina (1888–1990) – senior judge of United States Court of Appeals for the Second Circuit, former judge of the United States District Court for the Southern District of New York
- Carlos Menchaca (born 1980) – former member of the New York City Council
- Susana Mendoza (born 1972) – Illinois Comptroller, former City Clerk of Chicago, and former member of the Illinois House of Representatives
- Ken Miyagishima – mayor of Las Cruces, New Mexico
- Gloria Molina (1948–2023) – former chair of Los Angeles County, former member of the California State Assembly, former vice-chair of the Democratic National Committee
- Roberto Mondragón (born 1940) – former lieutenant governor of New Mexico
- Cindy Montañez (1974–2023) – former member of the California State Assembly
- Joseph Montoya (1915–1978) – former U.S. senator and congressman from New Mexico, former lieutenant governor of New Mexico, former member of both the New Mexico Senate and the New Mexico House of Representatives
- Néstor Montoya (1862–1923) – former congressman from New Mexico
- David Sánchez Morales (1925–1978) – CIA operative
- Eddie Morales (born 1975) – member of the Texas House of Representatives
- Howie Morales (born 1973) – lieutenant governor of New Mexico, former member of the New Mexico Senate
- Carlos R. Moreno (born 1948) – former justice on the California Supreme Court, former US ambassador to Belize, former judge of the United States District Court for the Central District of California
- Helena Moreno (born 1977) – mayor of New Orleans; former member of the New Orleans City Council, former president of the New Orleans City Council, former member of the Louisiana House of Representatives
- Ramiro Muñiz, known as Ramsey Muñiz (1942–2022) – first Hispanic whose name appeared on a Texas gubernatorial general election ballot, in 1972 and 1974, each time as the nominee of the Raza Unida Party but lost both elections
- Ricardo Muñoz (born 1965) – former member of the Chicago City Council
- Carlos Murguia (born 1957) – former judge of the United States District Court for the District of Kansas
- Mary H. Murguia (born 1960) – judge of the United States Court of Appeals for the Ninth Circuit, former judge of the United States District Court for the District of Arizona
- Ramón Músquiz (1797–1867) – governor of Coahuila and Texas from 1830 to 1831 and in 1835
- Grace Napolitano (born 1936) – former U.S. representative (CA-31), former member of the California State Assembly
- Cindy Nava, member of the New Mexico Senate
- Julian Nava (1927–2022) – former U.S. ambassador to Mexico
- Pedro Nava (born 1948) – former member of the California State Assembly
- Fabian Núñez (born 1966) – former speaker of the California State Assembly
- Estevan Ochoa (1831–1888) – historic mayor of Tucson, Arizona, first Mexican-American mayor after the Gadsden Purchase of 1854
- Richard Ojeda (born 1970) – former member of the West Virginia Senate
- Fernando M. Olguin (born 1961) – judge of the United States District Court for the Central District of California
- Darleen Ortega (born 1962) – judge on the Oregon Court of Appeals
- Liz Ortega (born 1977) – member of the California State Assembly
- Katherine D. Ortega (born 1934) – 38th Treasurer of the United States
- Aaron Ortiz (born 1991) – member of the Illinois House of Representatives
- Solomon Ortiz (born 1937) – former U.S. representative (TX-27)
- Mariano S. Otero (1844–1904) – former delegate from the Territory of New Mexico
- Miguel Antonio Otero (1829–1892) – former delegate from the Territory of New Mexico
- Miguel Antonio Otero (1859–1944) – former governor of New Mexico
- Rolando Pablos (born 1967) – former secretary of state of Texas
- Nick Pacheco (born 1964) – former member of the Los Angeles City Council
- Romualdo Pacheco (1831–1899) – former governor of California, former lieutenant governor of California, former California State Treasurer, former US congressman, former US ambassador to Costa Rica, El Salvador, Guatemala, Honduras, and Nicaragua
- Alex Padilla (born 1973) – U.S. senator from California, former secretary of state of California, former president of the Los Angeles City Council
- Imelda Padilla (born 1987) – member of the Los Angeles City Council
- Mike Padilla (born 1948/1949) – mayor of Topeka, Kansas
- Steve Padilla (born 1967) – member of the California Senate, former mayor of Chula Vista, California
- Richard Paez (born 1947) – federal judge on the United States Court of Appeals for the Ninth Circuit, former judge of the United States District Court for the Central District of California
- Veronica Paiz – member of the Michigan House of Representatives
- Ed Pastor (1943–2018) – former U.S. representative from Arizona (AZ-2; AZ-4; AZ-7)
- Federico Peña (born 1947) – former mayor of Denver, Colorado, former United States Secretary of Transportation, former United States secretary of energy, former member of the Colorado House of Representatives
- Francisco Perea (1830–1913) – former delegate from the Territory of New Mexico
- Pedro Perea (1852–1906) – former delegate from the Territory of New Mexico
- Marie Gluesenkamp Perez (born 1988) – U.S. representative from Washington (WA-3)
- Andrés Pico (1810–February 14, 1876) – mixed-race Californio youth; a successful rancher and commander; former member of both the California Senate and the California State Assembly; in 19th-century California; brother of Pío Pico
- Pío Pico (May 5, 1801 – September 11, 1894) – last governor of Alta California (now the State of California) under Mexican rule
- Margarita Prentice (1931–2019) – former member of the Washington Senate and the Washington House of Representatives
- Miguel A. Pulido (born 1956) – mayor of Santa Ana, California (1994–2020)
- Marcelino Quiñonez – former member of the Arizona House of Representatives
- Ceferino Quintana – former lieutenant governor of New Mexico
- Robert Ramirez – former member of the Colorado House of Representatives
- Carlos Ramirez-Rosa (born 1989) – member of the Chicago City Council
- Emily Randall (born 1985) – U.S. representative from Washington (WA-6), former member of the Washington Senate
- Irma Lerma Rangel (1931–2003) – former member of the Texas House of Representatives
- Jose Maria Redondo (1830–1878) – mayor of Yuma, Arizona (1878)
- Anthony Rendon (born 1968) – former speaker of the California State Assembly
- Ben Reyes (1947–2026) – former member of the Texas House of Representatives and the Houston City Council
- Silvestre Reyes (born 1944) – former U.S. congressman from Texas
- Cruz Reynoso (1931–2021) – judge on the Supreme Court of California, Presidential Medal of Freedom (recipient)
- Bill Richardson (1947–2023) – former governor of New Mexico, former United States ambassador to the United Nations, former United States secretary of energy, former U.S. congressman from New Mexico
- Rebecca Rios (born 1967) – former member of both the Arizona Senate (served as minority leader) and the Arizona House of Representatives
- Rosa Rios (born 1965) – 43rd treasurer of the United States, businesswoman, executive and entrepreneur.
- Luz Rivas (born 1974) – U.S. representative from California (CA-29); former member of the California State Assembly
- Albert Robles – former mayor of Carson, California and convicted criminal
- Ciro Rodríguez (born 1946) – former U.S. Congressman from Texas, former member of the Texas House of Representatives
- Regina M. Rodriguez (born 1963) – judge of the United States District Court for the District of Colorado
- Angela Romero – minority leader and member of the Utah House of Representatives
- Brenda Lopez Romero – former member of the Georgia House of Representatives
- Gloria Romero (born 1955) – former member of both the California Senate (served as majority leader) and the California State Assembly
- Regina Romero (born 1974) – mayor of Tucson, Arizona
- Trinidad Romero (1835–1918) – former delegate from the Territory of New Mexico
- Edward Roybal (1916–2005) – former U.S. representative from California (CA-30; CA-25), former member of the Los Angeles City Council
- Blanca Rubio (born 1969) – member of the California State Assembly
- Carmen Rubio – Portland City Commissioner
- Susan Rubio (born 1970) – member of the California Senate
- Ernesto Ruffo Appel (born 1952) – politician and former governor of Baja California
- Raul Ruiz (born 1972) – U.S. representative from California (CA-36; CA-25)
- Mary Salas (born 1948) – former mayor of Chula Vista, California, former member of the California State Assembly
- John Salazar (born 1953) – U.S. representative from Colorado (CO-3), former member of the Colorado House of Representatives
- Ken Salazar (born 1955) – former U.S. ambassador to Mexico, former United States secretary of the interior, former U.S. Senator (CO), former Colorado Attorney General
- Athena Salman (born 1989) – former member of the Arizona House of Representatives
- John Sanchez (born 1963) – former Lieutenant Governor of New Mexico and member of the New Mexico House of Representatives
- Loretta Sánchez (born 1960) – U.S. representative from California (CA-47)
- Linda Sánchez (born 1969) – U.S. representative (CA-39; CA-38)
- Brian Sandoval (born 1963) – former governor of Nevada, former Attorney General of Nevada, former judge of the United States District Court for the District of Nevada, former chair of the Nevada Gaming Commission, and former member of the Nevada Assembly
- Gerardo Sandoval (born 1962) – judge of the Superior Court of California
- Mariana Sandoval – member of the Arizona House of Representatives
- Andrea Salinas (born 1969) – U.S. representative from Oregon (OR-6), former member of the Oregon House of Representatives
- Simon Salinas (born 1955) – former member of the California State Assembly
- Oscar De Los Santos – member of the Arizona House of Representatives
- Xochitl Torres Small (born 1984) – former United States Deputy Secretary of Agriculture, former Under Secretary of Agriculture for Rural Development, former US representative from New Mexico (NM-2)
- Daniel Solis (born 1949) – former member of the Chicago City Council
- Hilda Solis (born 1957) – Chair of Los Angeles County, former U.S. Secretary of Labor, former U.S. representative from California (CA-31; CA-32), former member of both the California Senate and the California State Assembly
- Jose Solorio (born 1970) – former member of the Santa Ana, California City Council, former member of the California State Assembly
- Esmeralda Soria (born 1982) – member of the California State Assembly
- Thomas M. Storke (1876–1971) – former U.S. Senator from California
- Frank Tejeda (1945–1997) – former U.S. congressman from Texas, former member of both the Texas Senate and the Texas House of Representatives
- Cynthia Telles – U.S. ambassador to Costa Rica
- Raymond Telles (1915–2013) – first mayor of a large American city (El Paso, Texas), former US ambassador to Costa Rica
- Hector De La Torre (born 1967) – former member of the California State Assembly
- Esteban Edward Torres (1930–2022) – former U.S. Representative from California, former U.S. ambassador to UNESCO, and labor activist
- Ken Trujillo – former candidate for mayor of Philadelphia. He created largest not for profit serving Hispanic community in Philadelphia, The Congreso, which is now one of the largest anti-poverty advocates in the nation and served Philadelphia as city solicitor and an assistant U.S. attorney.
- Abelardo L. Valdez – diplomat and lawyer, president and vice chair of the Council of American Ambassadors
- Lupe Valdez (born 1947) – former sheriff of Dallas County
- Anna M. Valencia (born 1985) – City Clerk of Chicago
- Avelino Valencia (born 1988) – member of the California State Assembly
- Judith Valles (born 1933) – former mayor of San Bernardino, California
- Juan Vargas (born 1961) – U.S. representative from California (CA-51; CA-52), former member of both the California Senate and the California State Assembly, former member of the San Diego City Council
- Nora Vargas (born 1971) – former chair of the San Diego County Board of Supervisors
- Gabe Vasquez (born 1984) – U.S. congressman from New Mexico (NM-2); former member of the Las Cruces, New Mexico City Council
- Gaddi Vasquez (born 1955) – U.S. ambassador and 8th U.S. representative to the United Nations Food and Agriculture Organization, former member of the Orange County Board of Supervisors
- Martha Vázquez (born 1953) – judge of the United States District Court for the District of New Mexico
- Blanca Vela (1936–2014) – former mayor of Brownsville, Texas
- Filemón Vela Jr. (born 1963) – former U.S. representative (TX-34)
- Andrew Velasquez (born 1969) – regional administrator for the U.S. Department of Homeland Security's Federal Emergency Management Agency (FEMA)
- Antonio Villaraigosa (born 1953) – former mayor of Los Angeles, former member of the Los Angeles City Council, former speaker of the California State Assembly
- Barbara Vucanovich (1921–2013) – politician; first Latino American to serve in the House of Representatives, representing Nevada
- Kim McLane Wardlaw (born 1954) – judge of the United States Court of Appeals for the Ninth Circuit, former United States District Court for the Central District of California
- Joe Wardy (born 1953) – former mayor of El Paso, Texas
- Mary Yu (born 1957) – associate justice of the Washington Supreme Court
- Judith Zaffirini (born 1946) – member of the Texas Senate
- Juan Carlos Zarate – former Assistant Secretary of the Treasury for Terrorist Financing

== Military ==
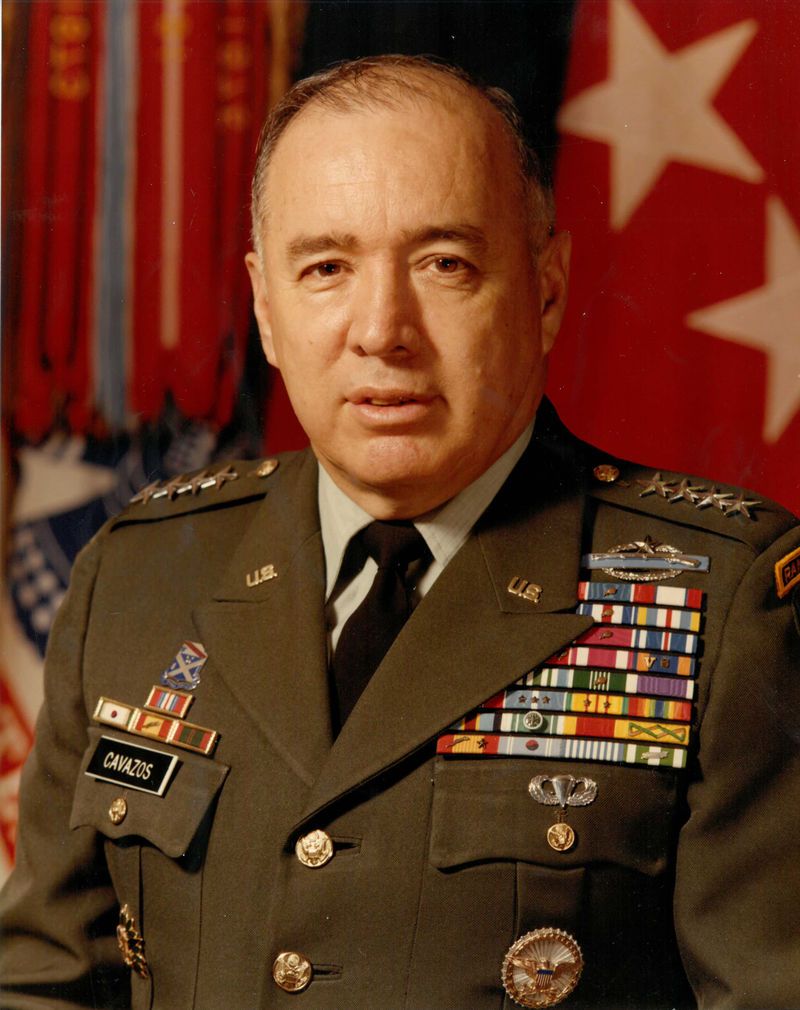
General Richard E. Cavazos

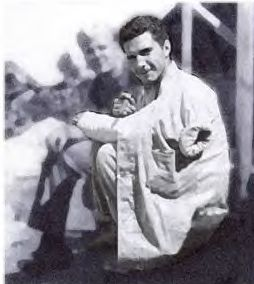
Guy Gabaldon

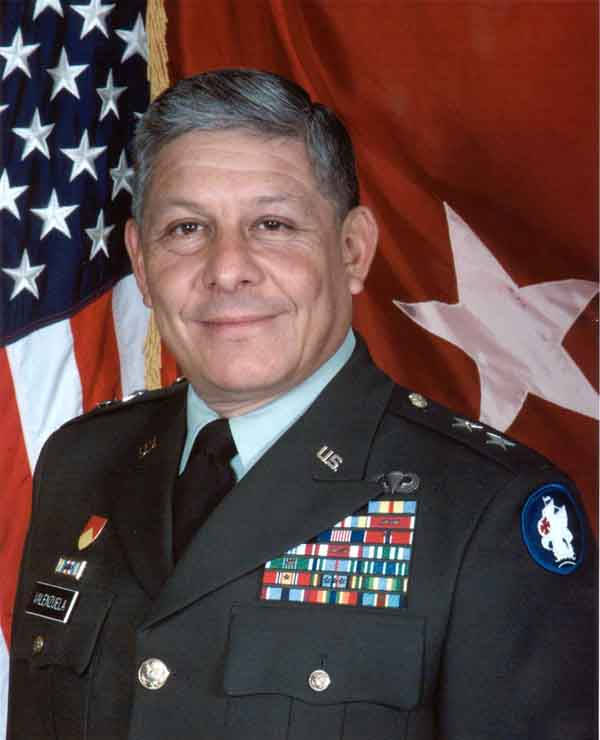
Army Major General Alfred Valenzuela

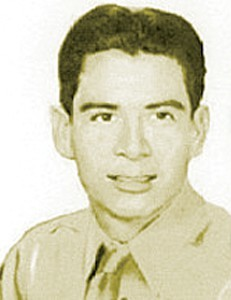
World War II Medal of Honor recipient Marcario Garcia

- Anthony Acevedo (1924–2018) – soldier during World War II whose diary was instrumental in documenting Nazi atrocities.
- Bertrand Blanchard Acosta (1895–1954) – aviator, fighter pilot
- Lucian Adams (1922–2003) – Medal of Honor (World War II)
- Michael J. Aguilar (born 1950) – Marine Corps brigadier general
- Everett Alvarez Jr. (born 1937) – Navy LCdr/pilot who endured 8.5 years in Vietnamese captivity and one of the longest periods as a U.S. prisoner of war (POW)
- Cipriano Andrade (1840–1911) – served in the United States Navy for forty years
- Juan G. Ayala – two-star General in the U.S. Marine Corps and former Commander of the Marine Corps Installations Command
- Joe R. Baldonado (1930–1950) – Medal of Honor (Korean War)
- David B. Barkley (1899–1918) – Medal of Honor (World War I)
- Roy Benavidez (1935–1998) – Medal of Honor (Vietnam War)
- Pedro Cano (1920–1952) – Medal of Honor (World War II)
- Robert Cardenas (1920–2022) – U.S. Air Force brigadier general
- Richard E. Cavazos (1929–2017) – first U.S. Army Hispanic 4-star general, Distinguished Service Cross (Korea and Vietnam)
- Manuel Antonio Chaves (1818? – 1889) – soldier in the Mexican Army and rancher in New Mexico
- Kathlene Contres (born 1955) – U.S. Navy
- Emilio A. De La Garza (1949–1970) – Medal of Honor (Vietnam War)
- Jesus S. Duran (1948–1977) – Medal of Honor (Vietnam War)
- Victor H. Espinoza (1929–1986) – Medal of Honor (Korean War)
- Santiago J. Erevia (1946–2016) – Medal of Honor (Vietnam War)
- Daniel Fernandez (1944–1966) – Medal of Honor (Vietnam War)
- José María Flores (1818–1866) – General and Governor of Alta California (Mexican–American War)
- Guy Gabaldon (1926–2006) – Navy Cross recipient, credited with capturing (or persuading to surrender) about 1,500 Japanese soldiers and civilians during the Battle of Saipan (World War II)
- Joe Gandara (1924–1944) – Medal of Honor (World War II)
- Candelario Garcia (1944–2013) – Medal of Honor (Vietnam War)
- Marcario Garcia (1920–1972) – Medal of Honor (World War II)
- Edward Gomez (1932–1951) – Medal of Honor (Korean War)
- Eduardo C. Gomez (1919–1972) – Medal of Honor (Korean War)
- Harold Gonsalves (1926–1945) – Medal of Honor (World War II)
- David M. Gonzales (1923–1945) – Medal of Honor (World War II)
- Alfredo Cantu "Freddy" Gonzalez (1946–1968) – Medal of Honor, KIA in Huế (Vietnam)
- Ambrosio Guillen (1929–1953) – Medal of Honor (Korean War)
- Rodolfo P. Hernandez (1931–2013) – Medal of Honor (Korean War)
- Silvestre S. Herrera (1917–2007) – Medal of Honor (World War II)
- Edward Hidalgo (1912–1995) – former Secretary of the Navy
- Jose F. Jimenez (1946–1969) – Medal of Honor (Vietnam)
- Miguel Keith (1951–1970) – Medal of Honor (Vietnam)
- Salvador J. Lara (1920–1945) – Medal of Honor (World War II)
- Felix Z. Longoria Jr. (1920–1945) – first Mexican American buried in Arlington National Cemetery (World War II)
- Jose M. Lopez (1910–2005) – Medal of Honor (World War II)
- Benito Martinez (1932–1952) – Medal of Honor (Korean War)
- Joe P. Martinez (1920–1943) – Medal of Honor (World War II)
- Joseph V. Medina (born 1953) – Brigadier General
- Louis Gonzaga Mendez Jr. (1915–2001) – highly decorated colonel, commander of the 3rd Battalion, 508th Parachute Infantry Regiment (World War II). He was born in Mexico.
- Tony Mendez (1940–2019) – ex-CIA agent, portrayed in 2012 film Argo
- Ernest Medina (1936–2018) – Captain of Company C, 1st Battalion, 20th Infantry of the 11th Brigade, Americal Division
- Manuel V. Mendoza (1922–2001) – Medal of Honor (World War II and Korean War)
- Eugene A. Obregon (1930–1950) – Medal of Honor (Korean War)
- Ralph Ambrose O'Neill (1896–1980) – flying ace during WWI
- Mike C. Pena (1924–1950) – Medal of Honor (World War II and Korean War)
- Rafael Peralta (1979–2004) – Navy Cross (Iraq War)
- Oscar F. Perdomo (1919–1976) – United States Air Force flying ace (World War II)
- Manuel Perez Jr. (1923–1945) – Medal of Honor (World War II)
- Leroy Petry (born 1979) – Medal of Honor (War in Afghanistan)
- Lori Piestewa (1973–2003) – first woman in the U.S. armed forces killed in the 2003 Iraq war
- Alfred V. Rascon (born 1945) – Medal of Honor (Vietnam War)
- Eldon Regua (born 1955) – Major General in the US Army reserve
- Louis R. Rocco (1938–2002) – Medal of Honor (Vietnam War)
- Jose Rodela (born 1937) – Medal of Honor (Vietnam War)
- Cleto Rodriguez (1923–1990) – Medal of Honor (World War II)
- Joseph C. Rodriguez (1928–2005) – Medal of Honor (Korean War)
- Alejandro R. Ruiz (1923–2009) – Medal of Honor (World War II)
- Ricardo Sanchez (born 1953) – U.S. Army general and author (Iraq War)
- Marcelino Serna (1896–1992) – Distinguished Service Cross (World War I)
- France Silva (1876–1951) – Medal of Honor (Boxer Rebellion)
- Alberto Valdés (1918–1998) – Good Conduct Medal, American Campaign Medal and European African Middle Eastern Campaign Medal (World War II)
- Jose F. Valdez (1925–1945) – Medal of Honor (World War II)
- Eugene A. Valencia Jr. (1921–1972) – flying ace (World War II), Navy Cross
- Alfred Valenzuela (born 1948) – major general, United States Army
- Jay R. Vargas (born 1938) – Medal of Honor (Vietnam)
- Ysmael R. Villegas (1924–1945) – Medal of Honor (World War II)
- Maximo Yabes (1932–1967) – Medal of Honor (Vietnam)
- Sam Ybarra (1945–1982) – U.S. Army soldier who served in the Tiger Force commando unit attached to the 101st Airborne Division during the Vietnam War; of Mexican and Apache descent

== Singers ==
- 2Slimey (born 2006) – rapper and songwriter
- Ana Victoria (born 1983) – singer-songwriter, daughter of the Mexicans Diego Verdaguer and Amanda Miguel
- Ángela Aguilar (born 2003) – singer, daughter of Pepe Aguilar
- Ashley Grace (born 1987) – singer-songwriter and activist, co-founder of the Mexican-American music duo, Ha*Ash
- Addison Rae (born 2000) – singer and actress
- Becky G (born 1997) – singer and actress
- Camila Cabello (born 1997) – singer-songwriter, former member of Fifth Harmony
- Carlos Santana (born 1947) – guitarist and founding member of Santana
- David Hidalgo (born 1954) – guitarist, founding member of the Chicano rock band Los Lobos
- Gerardo Ortiz (born 1989) – regional Mexican music singer
- Hanna Nicole (born 1985) – singer-songwriter and producer, co-founder member of the Mexican-American music duo, Ha*Ash
- Joan Baez (born 1941) – singer-songwriter and activist
- Omar Apollo (born 1997) – singer and composer
- Pepe Aguilar (born 1968) – singer and composer, son of the Mexican singers and actors Antonio Aguilar and Flor Silvestre
- Ritchie Valens (1941–1959) – singer and rock and roll pioneer
- Selena (1971–1995) – Tejano singer, called queen of Texan music
- Selena Gomez (born 1992) – singer-songwriter, her song "Lose You to Love Me" reached the top of the Billboard Hot 100
- Tekashi 69 (born 1996) – rapper and composer, his song "Trollz" with rapper Nicki Minaj reached the top of the Billboard Hot 100

== Scholars and educators ==
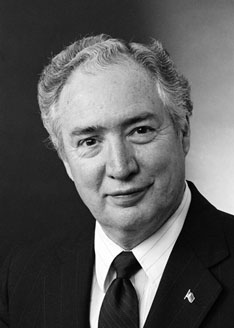
Lauro Cavazos

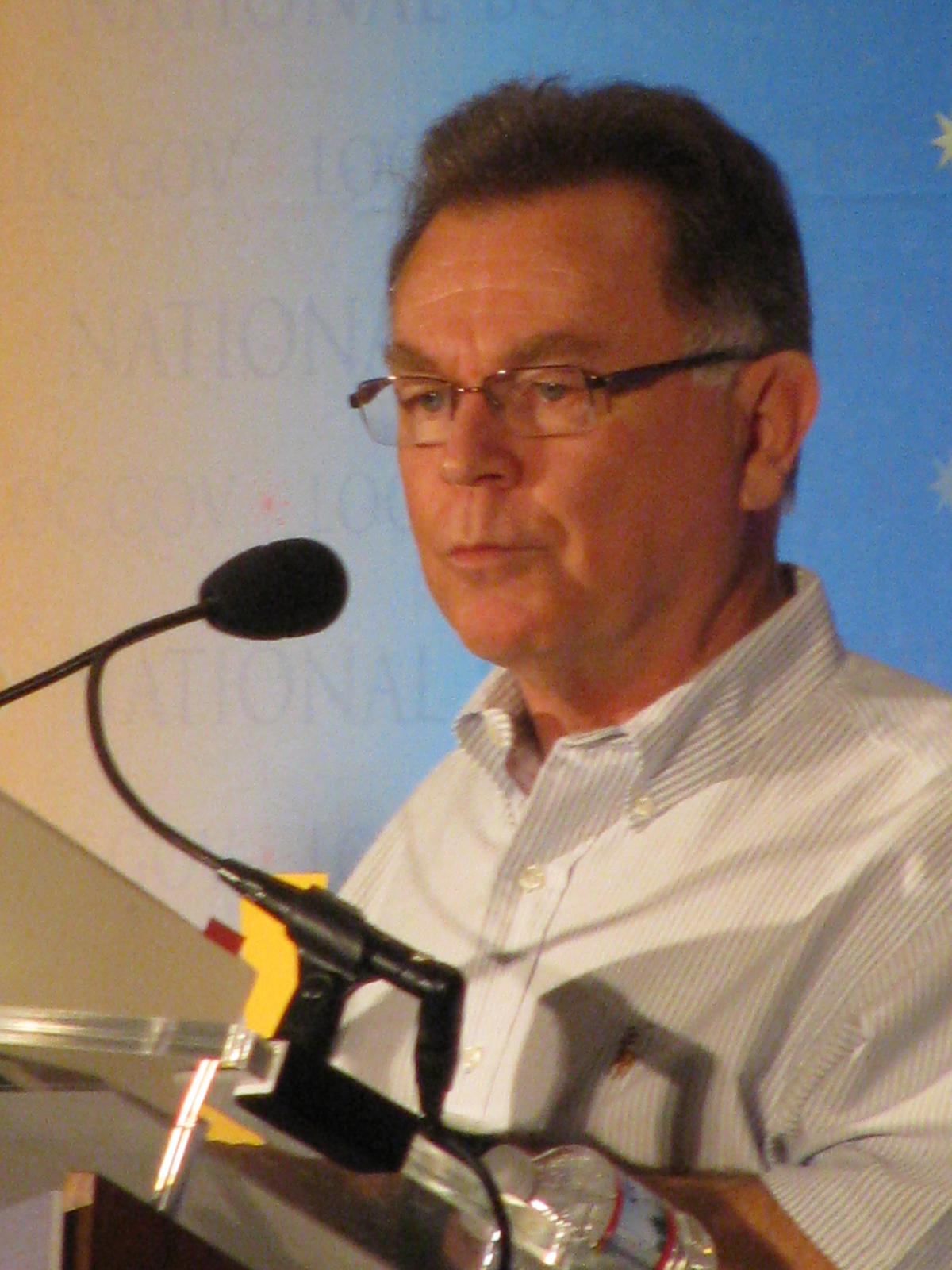
Alberto Ríos

J. Michael Ortiz

- Rodolfo Acuña (born 1932) – historian and professor
- Ricardo Ainslie – psychology professor
- Norma Alarcón (born 1943) – author, professor, and publisher
- Frederick Luis Aldama (born 1969) – university distinguished scholar, writer
- Lena Lovato Archuleta (1920–2011) – educator, librarian, and administrator
- Alfred Arteaga (1950–2008) – writer, poet, and scholar
- Deborah Berebichez – physicist, data scientist, and educator
- Martha E. Bernal (1931–2001) – clinical psychologist
- Elsa Salazar Cade (born 1952) – entomologist/science educator
- Mariano Velazquez de la Cadena (1778–1860) – grammarian, scholar, and author
- Nínive Clements Calegari (born 1971) – educator, founder of national literacy program, 826 National, and The Teacher Salary Project.
- Erika Tatiana Camacho (born 1974) – mathematical biologist
- Jimena Canales (born 1973) – physicist and engineer, and award-winning historian of science
- Richard Carranza – chancellor, New York City Public Schools, appointed in March 2018
- David Carrasco (born 1944) – historian of religion, anthropologist, and Mesoamericanist scholar
- Oscar Casares (born 1964) – author and professor
- Joseph I. Castro (born 1966) – chancellor of the California State University.
- Lauro Cavazos (1927–2022) – U.S. secretary of education (1988–1990)
- Gery Chico (born 1956) – chairman of the Illinois State Board of Education, politician and lawyer
- Francisco G. Cigarroa (born 1957) – chancellor of the University of Texas System and president of the UT Health Science Center in San Antonio, Texas
- Miguel Angel Corzo (born 1942) – CEO and president of LA Plaza de Cultura y Artes
- Maria Cotera (born 1964) – activist, author, researcher, and professor
- José Cuéllar – professor of Chicano studies
- Robert R. Davila (born 1932) – president of Gallaudet University
- Jorge Calles-Escandón (born 1951) – physician and researcher
- Roberta Fernández – novelist, scholar, critic, and arts advocate professor
- Rosa-Linda Fregoso – professor of Latin American studies
- Miguel García-Garibay – professor of chemistry and the dean of physical sciences at University of California, Los Angeles.
- Alicia Gaspar de Alba (born 1958) – historian, scholar, author
- Ignacio M. Garcia (born 1950) – professor of Western American history
- Juliet V. García – university president
- Laura E. Gómez (born 1964) – president of the Law and Society Association and a professor of law and American studies at the University of New Mexico
- Guillermo Gómez-Peña (born 1955) – performance artist, author, activist and educator
- Juan Gómez-Quiñones (1940–2020) – professor, historian, poet and activist
- Nicki Gonzales – professor and vice provost at Regis University, historian, Colorado State Historian
- Martin Guevara Urbina (born 1972) – writer, researcher, the professor whose work focuses on Latino issues
- José Ángel Gutiérrez (born 1944) – professor and attorney
- Ralph C. Guzmán (1924–1985) – political scientist, professor, author, deputy assistant U.S. secretary of state, provost of Merrill College UC Santa Cruz
- Esteban Rossi-Hansberg (born 1973) – professor of economics at Princeton University
- Socorro Hernandez-Bernasconi (born 1941) – teacher and activist
- Arturo Islas (1938–1991) – professor of English and novelist
- Kevin Johnson (academic) – Dean of the UC Davis School of Law
- Alejandro L. Madrid (born 1968) – professor of musicology and ethnomusicology at Cornell University
- Juan L. Maldonado (1948–2018) – higher education administrator
- Elizabeth Martinez (librarian) (born 1943) – professor and executive director of the American Library Association
- Ramiro Martinez Jr. (born 1962) – professor of criminology
- Miguel Méndez (legal scholar) (c. 1943 – 2017) – law professor and political figure
- Rachel Moran (born 1956) – dean of UCLA School of Law
- Jonathon J. Andrew Muñoz – philosopher and educator
- William Nericcio (born 1961) – Chicano literary theorist, American Literature scholar, and professor
- J. Michael Ortiz – president emeritus of Cal Poly Pomona
- Juan J. de Pablo (born 1962) – professor in the Institute for Molecular Engineering at the University of Chicago
- Pamela Anne Quiroz (born 1960) – professor of sociology
- Alberto Ríos (born 1952) – Regents' Professor at Arizona State University, educator and author.
- Vicki L. Ruiz (born 1955) – historian, president of the American Historical Association
- Ramón Saldívar (born 1949) – author, professor, and researcher of cultural studies, National Humanities Medal recipient
- Rita Sanchez (born 1937) – academic in the field of Chicano studies
- Hortensia Soto – mathematics professor at Colorado State University
- Richard A. Tapia (1939–2026) – mathematician
- Josefina Villamil Tinajero – president of the National Association for Bilingual Education
- John D. Trasviña (born 1954) – dean of the University of San Francisco School of Law, former Assistant Secretary of the Office of Fair Housing and Equal Opportunity
- Arnulfo Trejo (1922–2002) – writer, college professor, and literary activist
- María Urquides (1908–1994) – K-12 educator, "mother of bilingual education"
- Francisco H. Vázquez (born 1949) – scholar and public intellectual
- María Guillermina Valdes Villalva (1939–1991) – scholar and social activist
- Maria Cristina Villalobos – professor of mathematics
- Erv Wilson (1928–2016) – music theorist
- Leslie Wong (born 1949) – president of San Francisco State University

== Science and technology ==
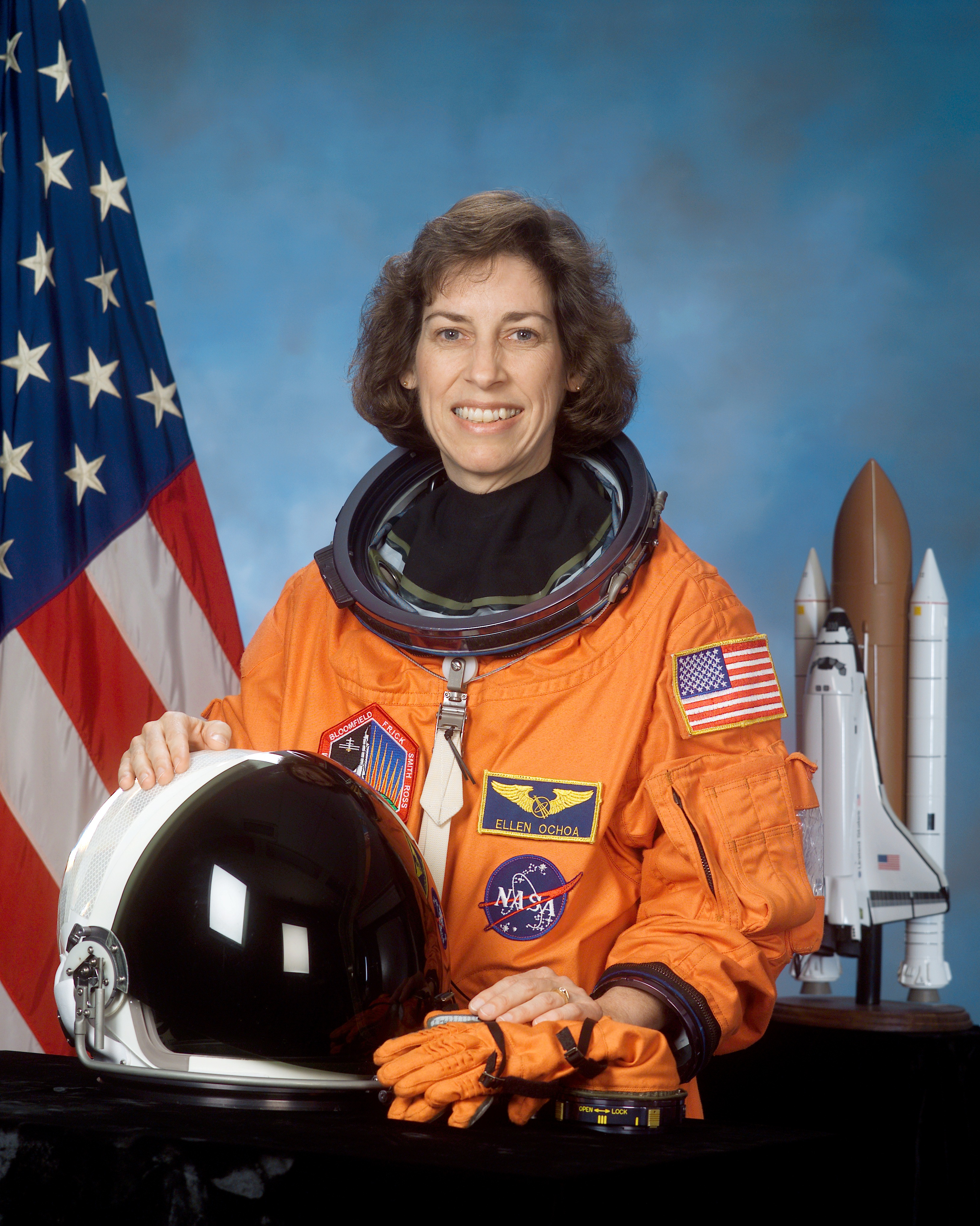
Ellen Ochoa

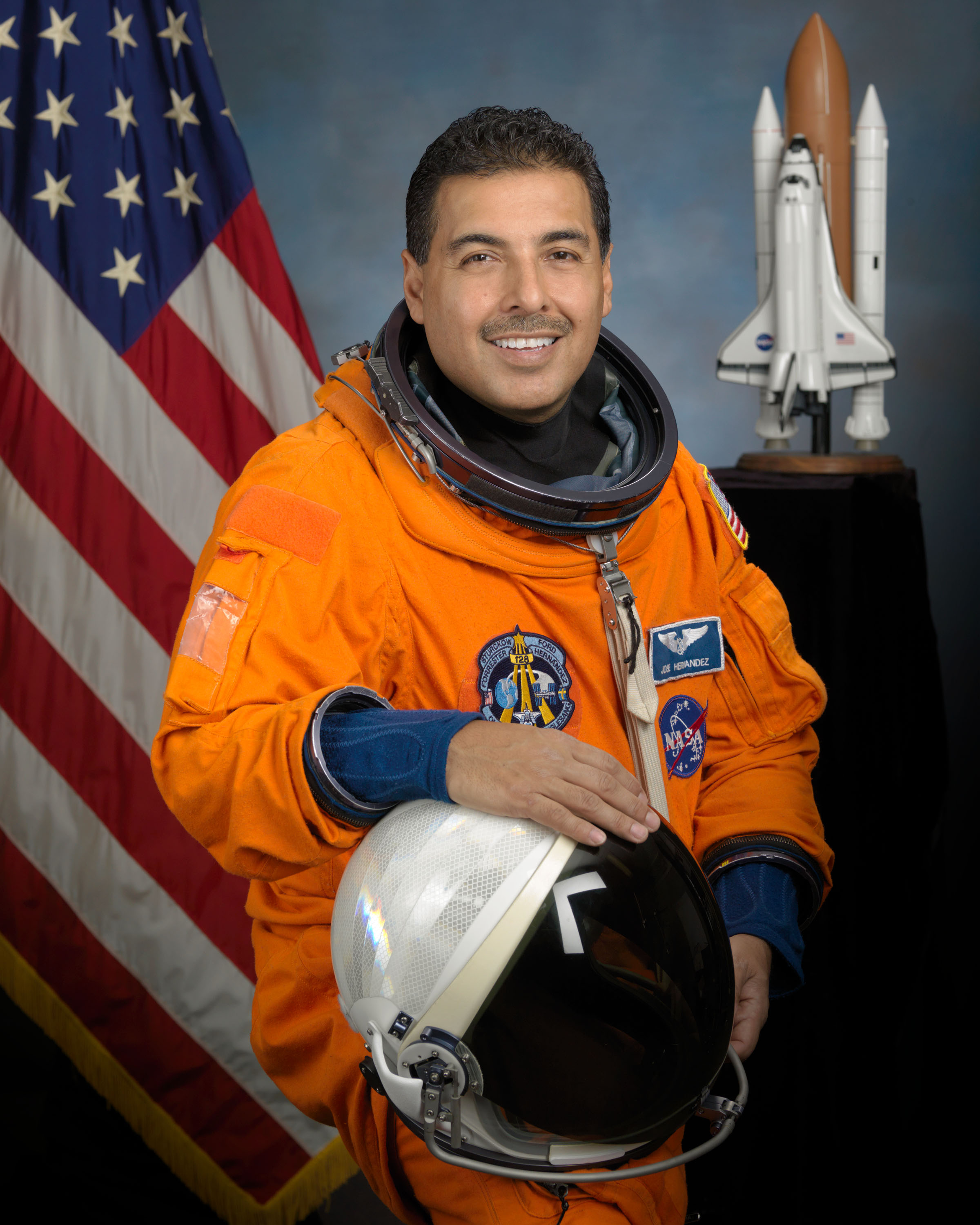
Jose Hernandez

- Sylvia Acevedo (born 1956/1957) – engineer and businesswoman, worked at NASA's Jet Propulsion Laboratory
- Albert Baez (1912–2007) – physicist and professor, developed the X-ray microscope
- John C. Baez (born 1961) – mathematical physicist
- Elsa Salazar Cade (born 1952) – science educator and entomologist
- Víctor Celorio (born 1957) – inventor of Instabook or book on demand
- France A. Córdova (born 1947) – former NASA chief scientist
- Jesús A. De Loera (born 1966) – mathematician at UC Davis
- Teofilo F. Gonzalez (born 1948) – computer scientist and professor
- Sidney M. Gutierrez (born 1951) – former astronaut
- Guadalupe Hayes-Mota – biotechnologist and business director
- José Hernández (born 1962) – former astronaut
- Miguel de Icaza (born 1972) – software programmer
- Lydia Villa-Komaroff (born 1947) – molecular and cellular biologist
- Ynes Mexia (1870–1938) – prominent botanist
- Ricardo Miledi (1927–2017) – neuroscientist and professor at University of California, Irvine
- Héctor García-Molina (1953–2019) – computer scientist and professor in the departments of computer science and electrical engineering at Stanford University
- Mario J. Molina (1943–2020) – co-discoverer of decomposition of ozone with CFC aerosols, Nobel laureate in Chemistry
- Ellen Ochoa (born 1958) – astronaut, director for flight crew operations for NASA
- John D. Olivas (born 1965) – NASA astronaut
- Jorge López (physicist) (born 1955) – physicist and professor
- Alfredo Quiñones-Hinojosa (born 1968) – associate professor of neurosurgery and oncology; director of the Brain Tumor Stem Cell Laboratory at Johns Hopkins University and brain surgeon at Johns Hopkins Hospital
- Paulo Lozano – aerospace engineer at MIT and pioneer in the field of micro-propulsion
- Eloy Rodriguez (born 1947) – biochemist, professor at Cornell University
- Sarah Stewart (1905–1976) – pioneered the field of viral oncology research
- Tedy Taylor (1925–2004) – theoretical physicist and nuclear weapon designer
- Ignacio Tinoco Jr. (1930–2016) – chemist and professor
- Jorge Gardea-Torresdey – chemist and academic
- Nora Volkow (born 1956) – scientist, physician, psychiatrist, great-granddaughter of Leon Trotsky and director of the National Institute on Drug Abuse (NIDA), part of the National Institutes of Health (NIH)

== Civil rights leaders and community activists ==
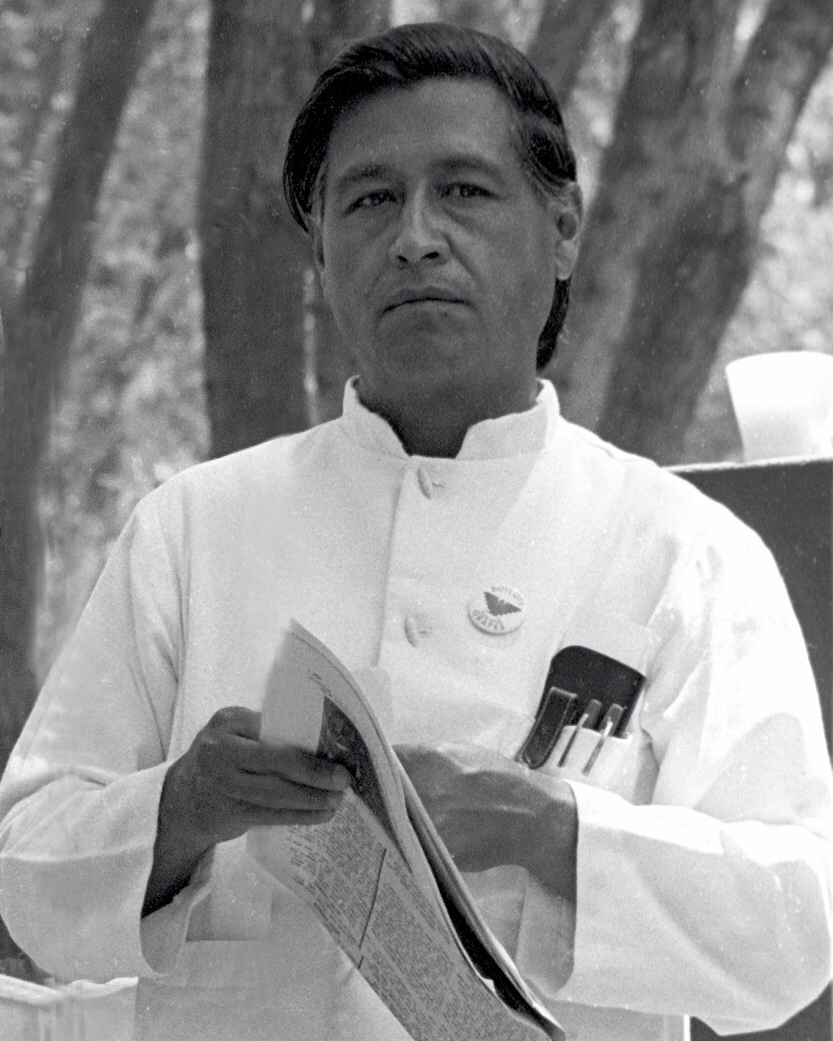
César Chávez at a United Farmworkers rally, 1974

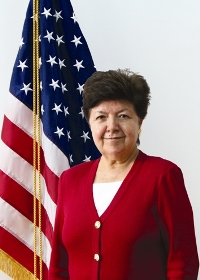
Vilma Martinez

- Lucy G. Acosta (1926–2008) – civil rights activist
- Gaylon Alcaraz (born 1970) – community organizer, human rights activist
- Lupe Anguiano (born 1929) – civil rights activist
- Lorena Borjas (1960–2020) – Mexican-born American transgender and immigrant rights activist, known as the mother of the transgender Latinx community in Queens, New York
- Norma V. Cantu (born 1954) – civil rights lawyer and college professor
- Carlos Cadena (1917–2001) – attorney in the landmark Hernandez v. Texas supreme court case
- Adelfa Botello Callejo (1923–2014) – civil rights lawyer
- José Tomás Canales (1877–1976) – civil rights activist and politician active during the early 1900s, played key role in the foundation of the League of United Latin American Citizens.
- Aurora Castillo (1914–1998) – environmental activist
- Sal Castro (1933–2013) – civil rights activist and educator
- Ernesto Chacon (born 1938) – Latino and low income civil rights activist
- César Chávez (1927–1993) – labor leader, activist, and accused child molester and rapist
- Linda Chavez-Thompson (born 1944) – former executive vice-president of the AFL–CIO
- Miguel Contreras (1952–2005) – labor leader
- Jeanne Córdova (1948–2016) – lesbian and gay rights activist, writer
- Bert Corona (1918–2001) – labor and community organizer
- Alvina Costilla (born 1926 or 1927) – activist and social worker
- Ricardo Cruz (1943–1993) – attorney, civil rights activist
- Jessie Lopez De La Cruz (1919–2013) – labor organizer
- Maria Echaveste (born 1954) – former White House Deputy Chief of Staff and Senior Fellow at the Center for American Progress
- Josefina Fierro de Bright (1914–1998) – civil rights activist during The Great Depression
- Ernesto Galarza (1905–1984) – labor activist, professor, and writer
- Gustavo C. Garcia (1915–1964) – attorney in the landmark Hernandez v. Texas supreme court case
- Hector P. Garcia (1914–1996) – physician, veteran, and civil rights advocate
- Eva Carrillo de García (1883–1979) – missionary, nurse, and civil-rights activist
- Oscar Gomez (activist) (died 1994) student activist
- Erika Guevara Rosas – human rights lawyer, Americas director at Amnesty International
- Anna Nieto-Gómez (born 1946) – activist and journalist
- Rodolfo Gonzales (1928–2005) – leader of the Chicano civil rights movement, boxer, poet
- José Ángel Gutiérrez (born 1944) – political activist, founder of the Raza Unida party, writer, and professor
- John J. Herrera (1910–1986) – civil rights leader
- Dolores Huerta (1930–2026) – civil rights leader
- Jovita Idar (1885–1946) – journalist, political activist and civil rights worker
- Ralph Lazo (1924–1992) – advocated on behalf of Japanese American internment victims.
- Nativo Lopez (1951–2019) – civil rights activist
- Raul Loya – civil rights activist
- Mimi Lozano (born 1933) – co-founded the Society of Hispanic Historical and Ancestral Research
- Angel G. Luévano (born 1949) – labor leader and activist
- Rueben Martinez (born 1940) – activist and businessman
- Vilma Socorro Martínez (born 1943) – civil rights activist, lawyer and diplomat
- Eliseo Medina (born 1946) – labor activist
- Enrique Morones – immigrant human rights activist
- Janet Murguía (born 1960) – civil rights activist
- Ernesto Nieto (born 1940) – founder of the National Hispanic Institute
- Alex Pacheco (born 1958) – activist
- Julian Samora (1920–1996) – community activist, teacher, and scholar
- Leila Steinberg (born 1961) – educator dedicated to helping at-risk youth find their voice using an emotional literacy curriculum, best known as mentor of rapper Tupac Shakur.
- Olga Talamante (born 1950) – political activist
- Emma Tenayuca (1916–1999) – labor organizer
- Reies López Tijerina (1926–2015) – activist, founder of the Alianza Federal de Mercedes
- John Trudell (1946–2015) – musician, author, poet, and political activist
- Cristina Tzintzún (born 1982) – organizer, author, and co-founder of the Workers Defense Project
- Baldemar Velasquez (born 1947) – president of the Farm Labor Organizing Committee
- Gustavo Velasquez (born 1972) – Secretary of the Office of Fair Housing and Equal Opportunity
- Delia Villegas Vorhauer (1940–1992) – activist, social worker, and writer
- Vicente T. Ximenes (1919–2014) – civil rights activist, commissioner of EEOC, and chairman of first Presidential Cabinet on Mexican American Affairs
- Raul Yzaguirre (born 1939) – civil rights activist

== Religious figures ==
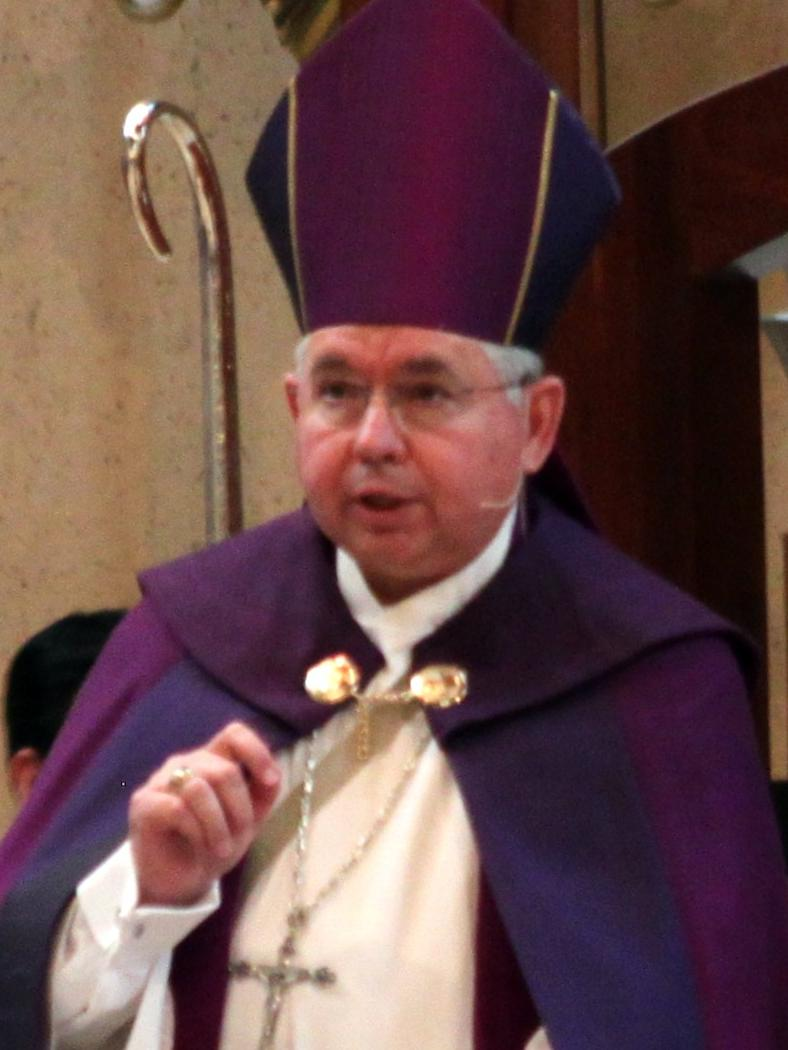
José Horacio Gómez, Archbishop of Los Angeles. Hispanics are predominantly Roman Catholic.

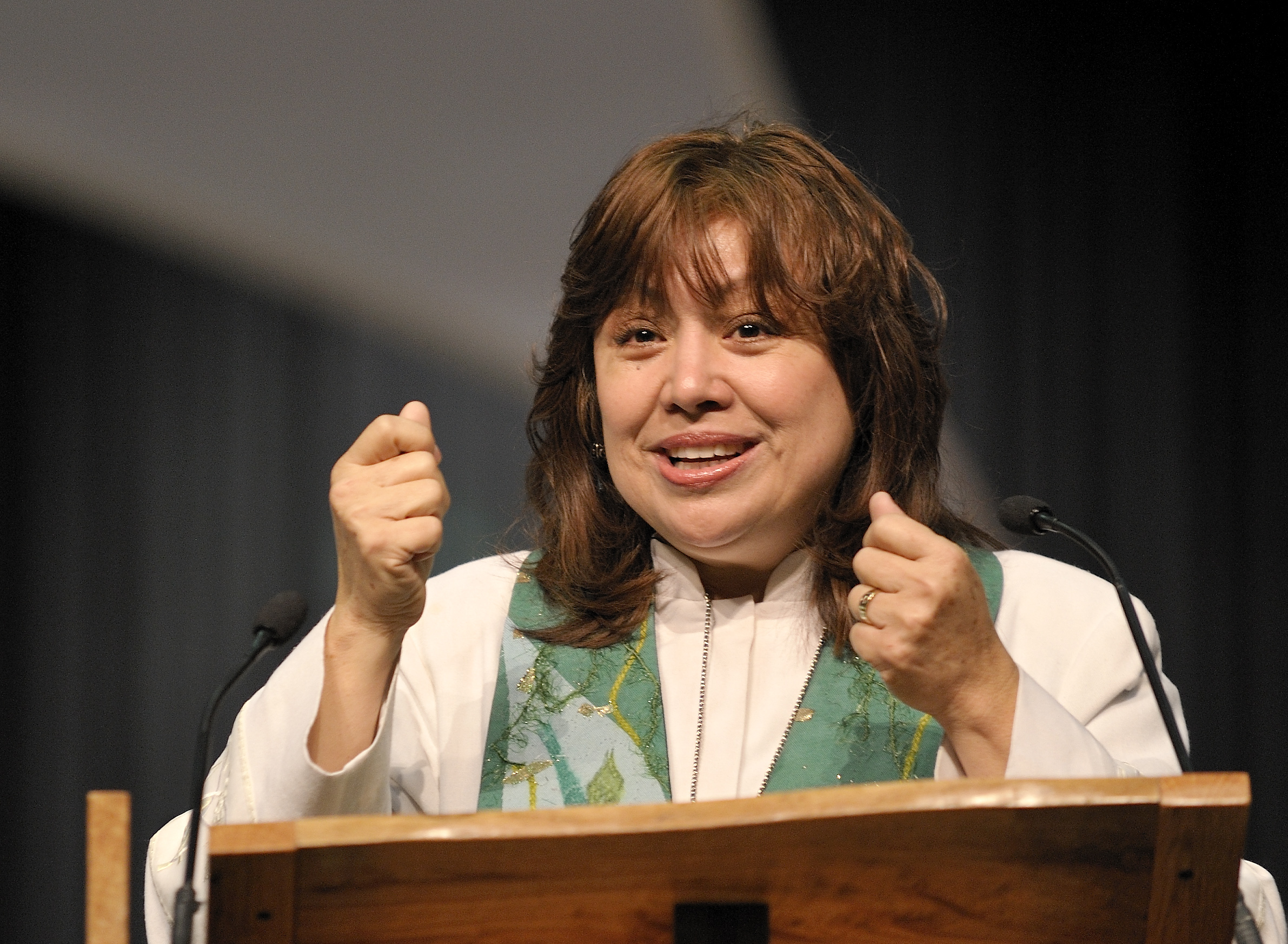
Methodist Bishop Minerva G. Carcaño

- Eusebio L. Elizondo Almaguer (born 1954) – Bishop of the Roman Catholic Archdiocese of Seattle
- Oscar Cantú (born 1966) – auxiliary bishop in San Antonio, Texas
- Minerva G. Carcaño (born 1954) – bishop in the United Methodist Church
- Arturo Cepeda (born 1969) – auxiliary Bbshop of the Archdiocese of Detroit
- Gilbert Espinosa Chávez (1932–2020) – Roman Catholic bishop
- Virgilio Elizondo (1935–2016) – Roman Catholic priest and theologian
- Cirilo Flores (1948–2014) – 5th Bishop of San Diego
- Daniel E. Flores (born 1961) – bishop of Brownsville
- Patrick Flores (1929–2017) – Roman Catholic bishop
- Elias Gabriel Galvan (born 1938) – retired bishop of the United Methodist Church
- Naason Joaquin Garcia (born 1969) – current international leader of the La Luz Del Mundo church, sentenced to nearly 17 years in prison for committing acts of sexual abuse against girls from his community and former pastor of several La Luz Del Mundo churches in California and Arizona between 1994 and 2014
- Richard John Garcia (1947–2018) – bishop of Monterey, California
- Gustavo García-Siller (born 1950) – archbishop of the Archdiocese of San Antonio
- José Horacio Gómez (born 1951) – archbishop of Los Angeles
- René Henry Gracida (1923–2026) – bishop
- Joel Nestali Martinez (born 1940) – bishop in the United Methodist Church
- Peter Morales – president of the Unitarian Universalist Association
- Eduardo Nevares (born 1954) – auxiliary Bishop of the Diocese of Phoenix
- Jorge Rodríguez-Novelo (born 1955) – auxiliary bishop for the Archdiocese of Denver
- Armando Xavier Ochoa (born 1943) – bishop of El Paso, TX
- Ricardo Ramírez (born 1936) – bishop of Las Cruzes, New Mexico.
- Plácido Rodriguez (born 1940) – bishop of Lubbock, Texas
- Alberto Rojas (born 1965) – auxiliary bishop and Episcopal Vicar for the Archdiocese of Chicago
- Jaime Soto (born 1955) – Roman Catholic coadjutor bishop of Sacramento
- James Anthony Tamayo (born 1949) – bishop of Laredo, Texas
- Ricardo Watty Urquidi (1938–2011) – bishop of the Diocese of Tepic in Nayarit, Mexico
- Joe S. Vásquez (born 1957) – bishop of the Roman Catholic diocese of Austin, Texas
- Gabino Zavala (born 1951) – auxiliary bishop of the Archdiocese of Los Angeles

== Businesspeople and entrepreneurs ==
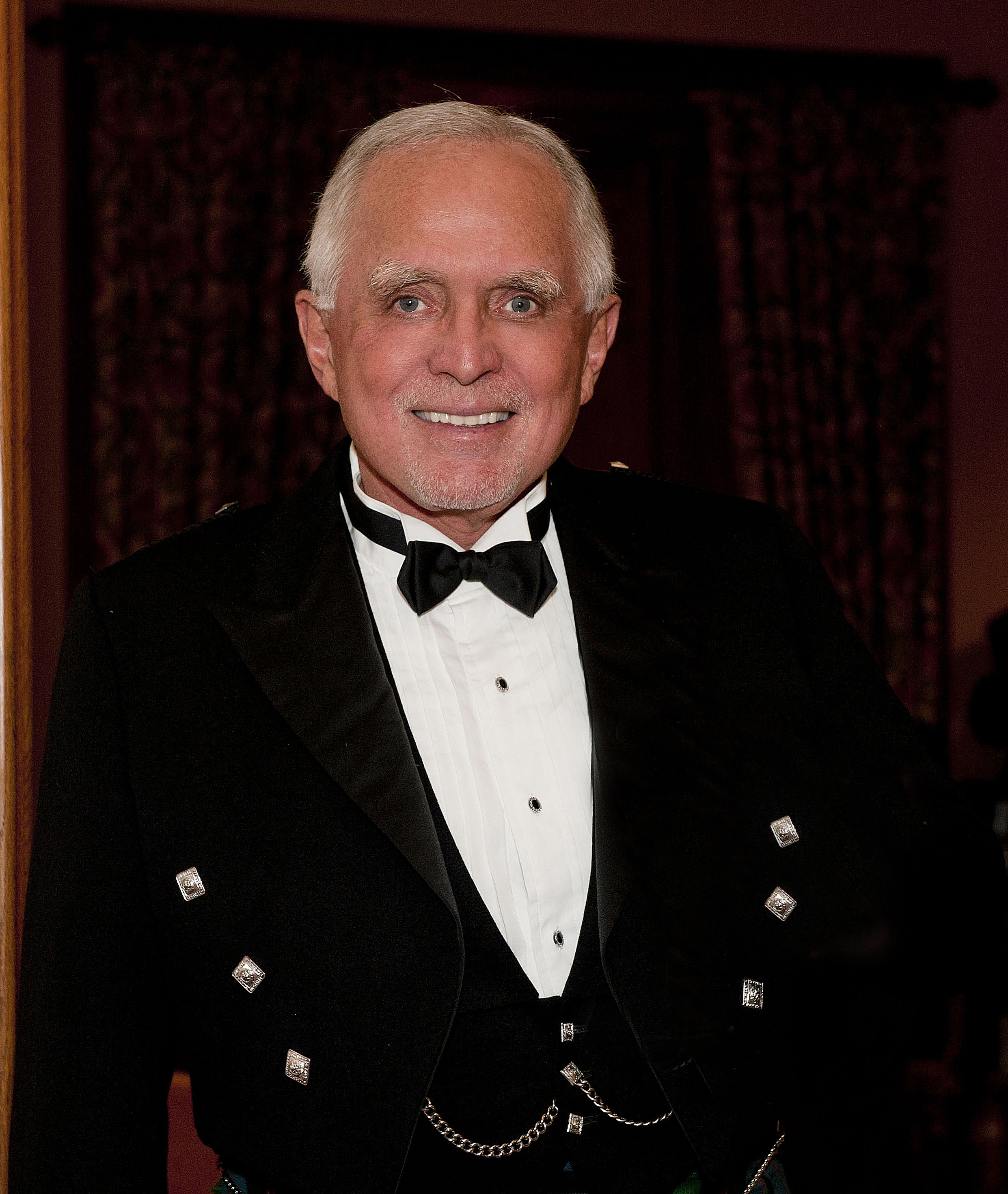
Dan Peña

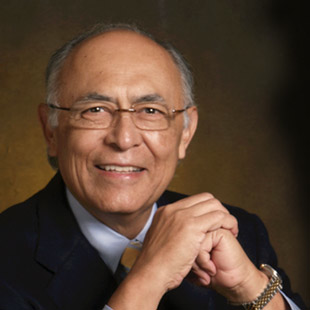
Hector Ruiz

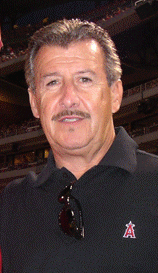
LA Angels owner Arte Moreno

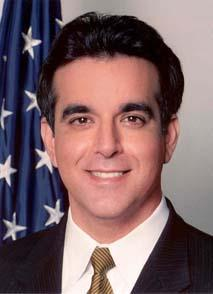
Hector Barreto Jr.

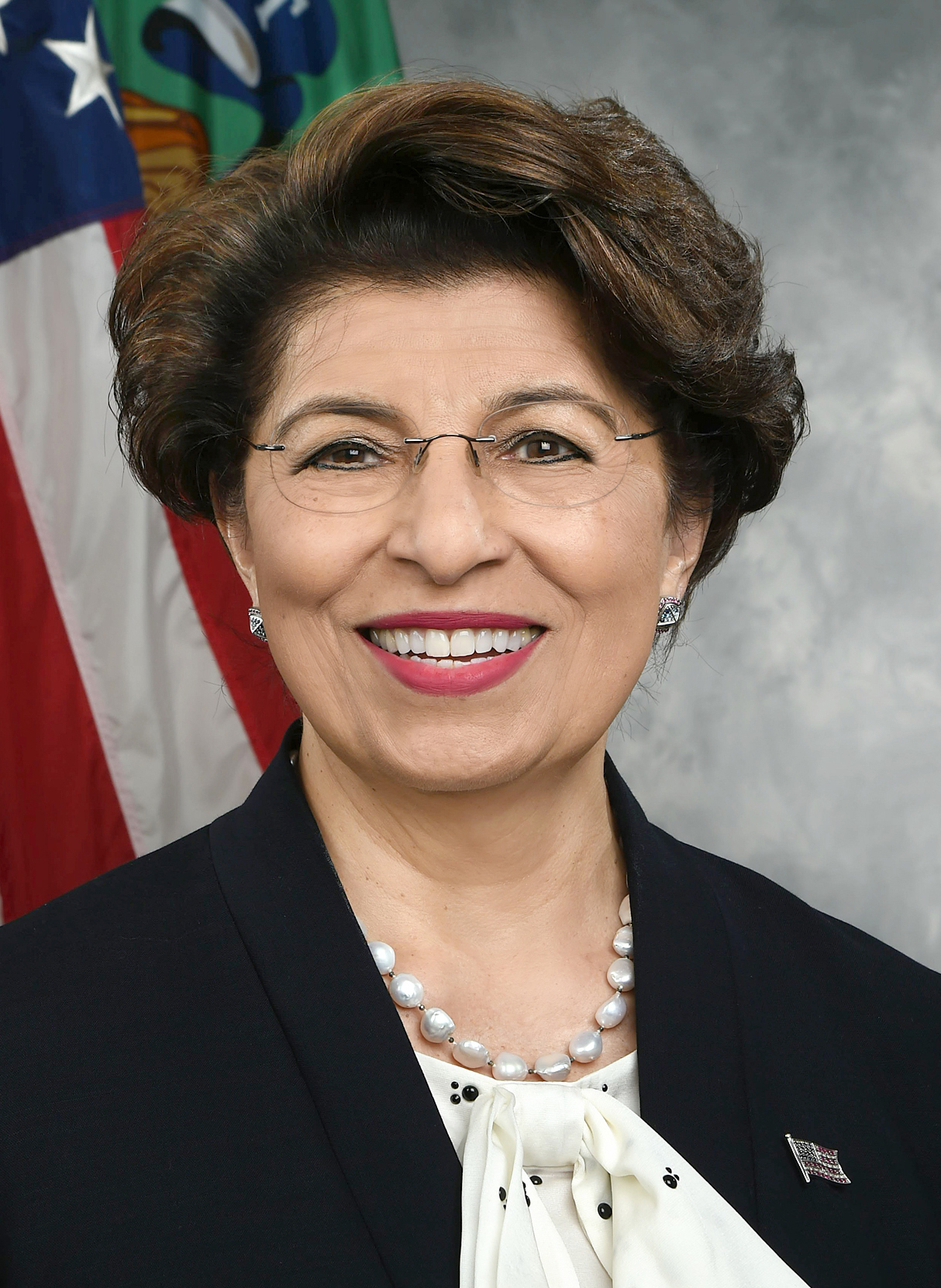
Jovita Carranza

- Manuel Abud – media, television, and cable executive
- Linda G. Alvarado (born 1951) – president and chief executive officer of a large commercial and industrial general contracting firm, co-owner of the Colorado Rockies baseball team.
- María Elena Avila (born 1953) – entrepreneur, philanthropist, and civic leader in California
- Michael Ball – fashion mogul
- Hector Barreto Jr. (born 1961) – 21st Administrator of the US Small Business Administration
- Emilio Diez Barroso – chairman and CEO of NALA Investments, a private investment holding company
- Xochi Birch – computer programmer and entrepreneur
- Adolfo Camarillo (1864–1958) – businessman, wealthy landowner, and philanthropist
- Juan Camarillo Jr. (1867–1936) – businessman, wealthy landowner, and philanthropist
- Jovita Carranza (born 1949) – President & CEO of the JCR Group, a consulting firm; former Deputy Administrator for the United States Small Business Administration
- Rudy Chapa (born 1957) – track runner and businessman
- Anna Maria Chávez (born 1968) – CEO of the Girl Scouts of the USA
- Chicano Roy (Roy Suarez Garcia) (1945–2003) – motorbike builder and inventor
- Maria Contreras-Sweet (born 1955) – 24th Administrator of the Small Business Administration, former executive chairwoman and founder of ProAmérica Bank, and California Secretary of Business, Transportation and Housing Agency
- Mike Curb (born 1944) – record company executive, NASCAR car owner, and former lieutenant governor of California
- William Davila (1931–2014) – first Mexican-American president of a large supermarket chain
- Gérard Louis-Dreyfus (1932–2016) – chairman of Louis Dreyfus Energy Services
- Juan Enríquez (born 1959) – Managing Director of Excel Venture Management, academic, and speaker
- Tavo Hellmund (born 1966) – former racing driver and promoter
- Enrique Hernandez Jr. (born 1955) – business executive, president, and chief executive officer of Inter-Con Security Systems, Inc., and a director of Wells Fargo and McDonald's
- Traci Des Jardins (born 1967) – restaurateur and award-winning chef
- Ninfa Laurenzo (1924–2001) – restaurateur
- Bismarck Lepe – information technology CEO and product manager
- Ignacio E. Lozano Sr. (1886–1953) – founder of La Opinión, the largest Spanish language newspaper in the US
- Ignacio E. Lozano Jr. (born 1927) – newspaper publisher, ambassador, and corporate director
- José I. Lozano (born 1954) – executive vice-president of Impremedia LLC
- Daniel Lubetzky (born 1968) – entrepreneur, author, and activist, best known as the Founder and CEO of KIND LLC.
- David Martinez (born 1957) – managing partner
- Mariano Martinez (entrepreneur) (born 1944) – inventor, entrepreneur, and restaurateur
- Emilio Azcárraga Milmo (1930–1997) – CEO, media mogul
- Richard Montañez – best known for claiming to have invented Flamin' Hot Cheetos
- Kate and Laura Mulleavy (born 1979, born 1980) – fashion designers
- Oscar Munoz (executive) (born 1960) – CEO of United Airlines
- Hugo Morales (radio) – radio executive
- Arturo Moreno (born 1946) – businessman and owner of the Los Angeles Angels
- Rick Owens – fashion designer
- George Paz – CEO of Express Scripts, the largest pharmacy benefit management organization in the US
- Dan Peña (born 1945) – financial analyst on Wall Street
- Lisa Garcia Quiroz (1961–2018) – media executive, launched People en Español
- Emilio Romano – managing director of Bank of America Merrill Lynch Mexico
- John Romero (born 1967) – video game developer, co-founder of id Software
- Rosa Rios (born 1965) – 43rd and current treasurer of the United States, businesswoman, executive, and entrepreneur.
- Louis Ruiz (born 1953) – creator of Ruiz Foods, Inc., largest Latino-owned company in California
- Leslie Sanchez (born 1971) – founder and CEO of Impacto Group LLC, a Washington, D.C.-based market research and consulting firm
- Tony Sanchez (born 1943) – businessman, philanthropist, and Democratic politician
- Felix Tijerina (1905–1965) – restaurateur, activist, and philanthropist
- Solomon Trujillo (born 1951) – CEO and businessman
- Louis Verdad – fashion designer
- Sam Zamarripa (born 1952) – entrepreneur, author, and public official
- Sergio Zyman (born 1945) – marketing executive

== Historical figures ==
- Gregorio Cortez (1875–1916) – Mexican-American outlaw and folk hero
- Joaquin Murrieta (1829–1853) – Mexican bandit or Robin Hood during the California Gold Rush of the 1850s

== Food ==
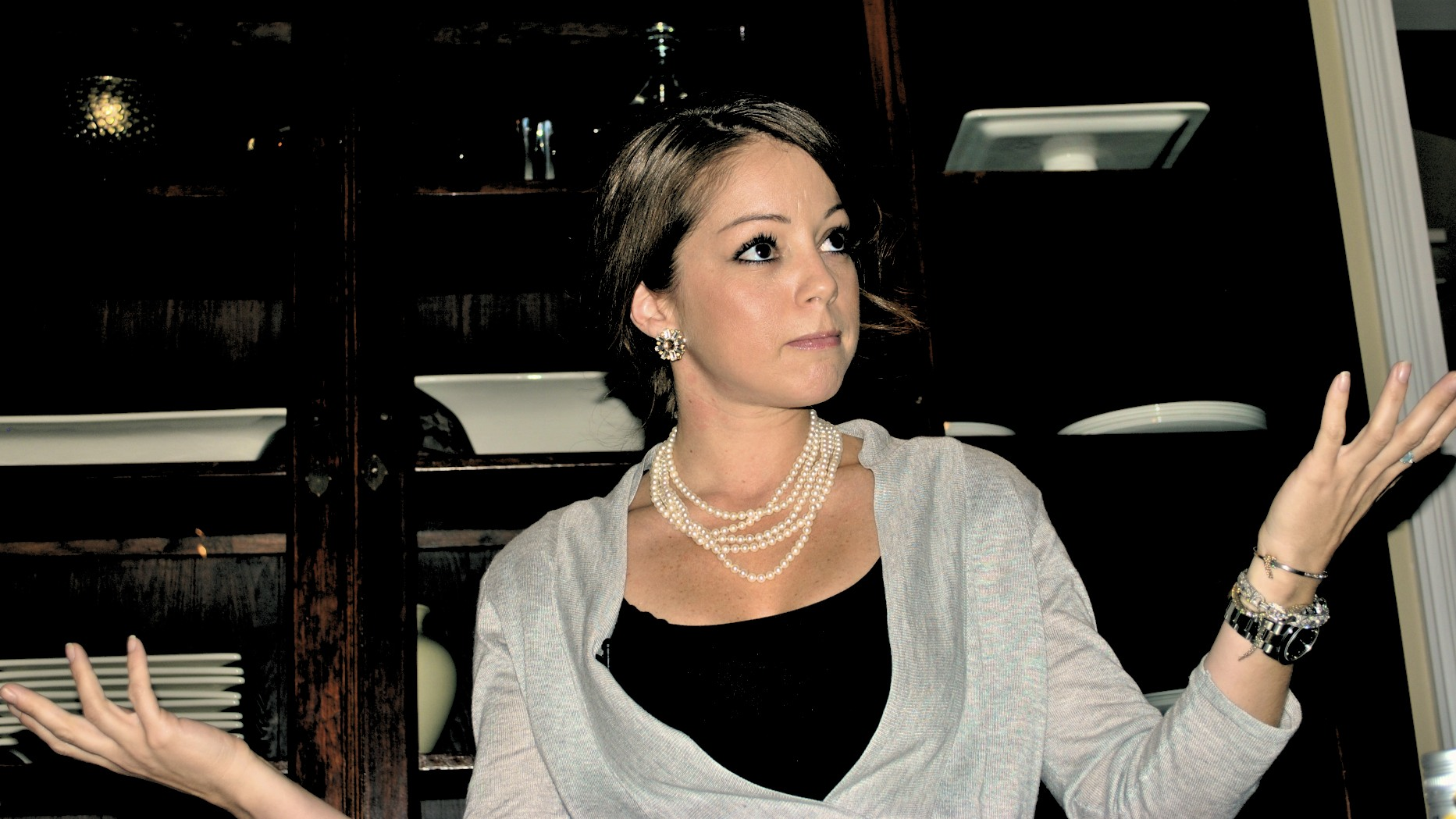
Marcela Valladolid

- Gustavo Brambila (born 1953) – winemaker in the Napa Valley
- Pati Jinich (born 1972) – Emmy-nominated chef, TV personality, cookbook author
- Aarón Sanchez (born 1976) – chef and television personality
- Marcela Valladolid (born 1978) – chef and television host
- Traci Des Jardins – chef and restaurateur

== Other ==
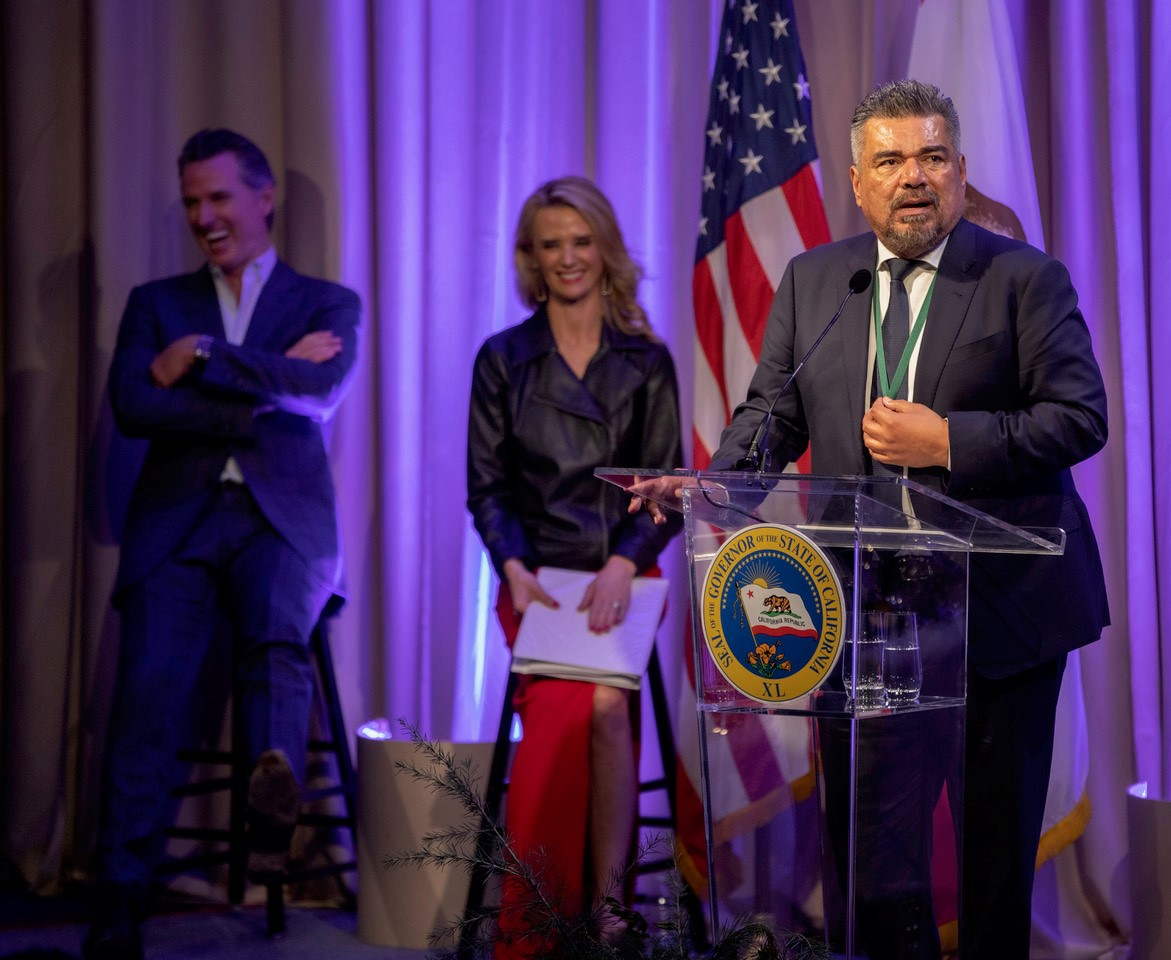
George Lopez

- Blaire White (born 1993) – YouTuber, political commentator, Internet personality
- Jimmy Santiago Baca (born 1952) – American poet and writer of Apache and Chicano descent
- Johnny Canales (born 1947) – talk show host
- Gregorio Cortez (1875–1916) – Mexican-born and a folk hero to the border communities of the United States and Mexico
- Nick Fuentes (born 1998) – far-right political commentator and live streamer
- Mark Hugo Lopez (born 1967) – Director of Hispanic Research at the Pew Research Center
- Oscar Ozzy Lusth (born 1981) – 1st runner-up on Survivor; Cook Islands
- Jair Marrufo (born 1977) – professional soccer referee
- Edmund McMillen (born 1980) – video game designer and artist
- Raul Melgoza (1975–2020) – fashion designer
- Cesar Millan (born 1969) – TV personality, dog trainer, and author
- Carmen Osbahr (born 1962) – puppeteers Rosita in the children's series Sesame Street
- Albert Pissis (1852–1914) – architect who introduced the Beaux-Arts architectural style to San Francisco
- Richard Ramirez (1960–2013) – serial killer
- Dionicio Rodriguez (1891–1955) – architect
- John Romero (born 1967) – American director, designer, programmer, and developer in the video game industry; co-founder of id Software
- Baldomero Toledo (born 1970) – professional soccer referee
- Edgar Valdez Villarreal (born 1973) – drug lord
- Luis Velador (born 1964) – two-time World Series of Poker bracelet winner
- Eric Volz (born 1979) – entrepreneur, author, and managing director of an international crisis resource agency
- Eduardo Xol (born 1966) – mostly known for his work as a designer on Extreme Makeover: Home Edition

== See also ==
- Notable Hispanics
- Chicano
- List of Mexicans
- List of Mexican British people
