= Deena J. González =

Chicana historian

- Born: August 25, 1952 (age 74); Hatch, New Mexico, U.S.
- Education: New Mexico State University (BA); University of California, Berkeley (MA, PhD)
- Occupation: Historian
- Employer: Gonzaga University
- Notable work: Refusing the Favor: The Spanish-Mexican Women of Santa Fe 1820-1880 (1999)

Deena J. González (born August 25, 1952) is a Chicana historian and former Provost and Senior Vice President of Gonzaga University (GU). González has released over 50 academic publications over the history of Chicanos/as and their presence in the United States. She is also a founding member of the national organization, Mujeres Activas en Letras y Cambio Social (MALCS) (Women Active in Letters and Social Change), that promotes research in Chicana, Latina, Native American, and Indigenous communities.

In 2006 as part of the Smith College project, González was acknowledged as one of the fifty most influential living women historians in the U.S.

== Early life and education ==
Deena J. González, daughter of Santiago and Vidal Trujillo González, was born in Hatch, New Mexico, on August 25, 1952. She was raised in Garfield, New Mexico, as a Catholic.

González's childhood consisted of living on her family farm, where she would help her family and spend her free time playing sports such as basketball or softball with the other kids in her neighborhood. González and most of her siblings were inspired to enter academia by their mother, who was a school teacher.

Living in New Mexico led to González having exposure to the 1960s Chicano Movement as a teen. González also sat in on the trial of Reies Tijerina as part of a high school field trip. She graduated near the top of her class at Hot Springs High School.

She began her collegiate studies at New Mexico State University in the pursuit of a pre-medical degree, but later transferred to history. Once González obtained her bachelor's degree in history, she attended the University of California, Berkeley, from 1974 to 1985 to receive her M.A. and Ph.D. in history. She was the first identified Chicana to receive a Ph.D. degree from UC Berkeley's History Department.

== Teaching career ==
Toward the end of her Ph.D., González became an instructor at Pomona College in 1983, teaching history and Chicano/a studies. After noticing the student body mainly consisted of white people with very few non-white students, she chaired the affirmative action board for the next ten years in an effort to increase the student diversity in the college. Through the help of Pomona College funding, González finished her dissertation and also played a role in diversifying Pomona College's faculty.

With her Ph.D., in 1985, she began teaching classes at Pomona College as an assistant professor, eventually becoming associate professor of history and Chicano Studies.

In 2001, Deena J. González left her post at Pomona College to work at Loyola Marymount University (LMU), becoming the chair of the Chicano and Chicana Studies department there until 2009. During her time at LMU, she was sent to the American Council on Education Fellows Program in 2010–2011 to train for an executive role. Giving up the chair, she became Director of Faculty Development in 2011, then took the position of Associate Provost for Faculty Development in 2012.

Staying in that position until 2018, she then moved on to Gonzaga University as provost and senior vice president (2019–2021). She then served as senior university fellow and professor of history until 2023, when she retired. She served around this time as chair of the National Association of Chicana and Chicano Studies.

Gonzalez mentored an entire generation of historians, among them Professor Jennifer Guglielmo.

== Scholarship ==
=== "Malinche As Lesbian: A Reconfiguration of 500 Years of Resistance" (1991) ===
Released in the journal California Sociologist, this article focuses on why Malinche is not often discussed in history despite her pivotal role in the conquest of the Aztec Empire. González posits that there this treatment is similar to the ways lesbians are historically erased. By using this lens, she creates an argument showing the marginalization of and prejudice against the queer community.

=== Refusing the Favor: The Spanish-Mexican Women of Santa Fe 1820-1880 (1999) ===
González's dissertation was published as The Spanish-Mexican Women of Santa Fe: Patterns of Their Resistance and Accommodation, 1820–1880, in 1985. Her monograph Refusing the Favor is a continuation of that study. The book focuses on the impact of the Mexican Cession of states to the United States, and specifically how it affected Mexican American women. The book goes over the legal disputes Spanish-Mexican Women endured and provides a feminist reconstruction of Gertrudis Barceló.

=== The Oxford Encyclopedia of Latinos and Latinas in the United States (4 volumes, 2005) ===
González was a co-editor-in-chief, along with Suzanne Oboler, of The Oxford Encyclopedia of Latinos and Latinas in the United States. The four-volume encyclopedia was meant to be a comprehensive collection of works representing different communities from Latin America living in the U.S. The first encyclopedia was a success, leading to another encyclopedia with Oxford University Press and representing a shift in bringing Latino/Latina history, culture, and politics to a broader audience in the U.S. and internationally.

Key parts of the original four volumes later ended up being included in the second Oxford encyclopedia entitled The Oxford Encyclopedia of Latinos and Latinas in Contemporary Politics, Law, and Social Movements, bringing together the scholarship on the political landscape of Latinos in the United States.

== Mujeres Activas En Letras Y Cambio Social ==
Mujeres Activas En Letras Y Cambio Social (MALCS) (Women Active in Letters and Social Change) is a national academic organization created to advance academic Chicana/Latina literature during a time when the literature was mainly focused on men. Deena J. González was the co-founder of the organization alongside Antonia Castañeda, Ada Sosa Riddell, Adela de la Torre, Lupe Frias, Beatriz Pesquera, Arlie Hochschild, Teresa Cordova, and Margarita Decierdo. Each woman specialized in a different area of study, which together focused on furthering the studies on Chicana women living in the United States.

This organization was put together in 1982 by González and her graduate student colleagues as well as two Chicana faculty members who came together to speak for the "Mujeres en Marcha" (Women on the March) panel at the National Association for Chicano Studies which addressed "the sexism and hidden barriers that were present in academia".

MALCS published a journal, Chicana/Latina Studies. The journal included González's work multiple times. Deena J. González spoke on panels for MALCS on different subjects within feminist Chicana history and also served on both the editorial and planning boards from 1982–1990. While she is no longer on the board, González continues to attend the conferences.
