= Juan Gómez-Quiñones =

American historian (1940–2020)

Juan Gómez-Quiñones (January 28, 1940 – November 11, 2020) was an American historian, professor of history, poet, and activist. He was best known for his work in the field of Chicana/o history. As a co-editor of the Plan de Santa Bárbara, an educational manifesto for the implementation of Chicano studies programs in universities nationwide, he was an influential figure in the development of the field.

== Early life and education ==
Gómez-Quiñones was born in the city of Parral, Chihuahua, Mexico, and raised in East Los Angeles. He graduated from Cantwell Sacred Heart of Mary School, a Catholic high school in Montebello, California. He subsequently attended the University of California, Los Angeles, earning his bachelor's degree in literature, his Master of Arts in Latin American studies, and his doctorate of philosophy in history. His 1972 dissertation was titled "Social Change and Intellectual Discontent: The Growth of Mexican Nationalism, 1890-1911."

== Career ==
Gómez-Quiñones began teaching at the University of California, Los Angeles in 1969, and held his post for over forty years. He served as the director of UCLA's Chicano Studies Research Center, and was a founding co-editor of Aztlán, an academic journal of Chicano studies.

Gómez-Quiñones also served on the board of the Mexican American Legal Defense and Education Fund.

== Honors and awards ==
- (1966–1968) Foreign Area Fellow. Sponsored by the Social Science Research Council and the American Council of Learned Societies
- (1990) Scholar of the Year Award from the National Association of Chicana and Chicano Studies
- National Endowment for the Humanities Fellow

== Bibliography ==
- Gómez-Quiñones, Juan (1973). Sembradores, Ricaŕdo Flores Magon y el Partido Liberal Mexicano: a eulogy and critique. Los Angeles: Aztlán Publications. LCCN 74177297. OCLC 1033482.
- Gómez-Quiñones, Juan (1974). 5th and Grande vista : poems, 1960-1973. Staten Island: Editorial Mensaje. ISBN 8439928505. LCCN 75512573. OCLC 1660435.
- Gómez-Quiñones, Juan (1977). Las ideas políticas de Ricardo Flores Magón. Roberto Gómez Ciriza (trans.). México: Ediciones Era.
- Gómez-Quiñones, Juan (1978). Mexican students por la raza: the Chicano student movement in southern California, 1967-1977. Santa Bárbara: Editorial La Causa.
- Gómez-Quiñones, Juan (1981). Porfirio Díaz, los intelectuales y la revolución. México: El Caballito. ISBN 968-6011-11-0.
- Gómez-Quiñones, Juan (1982). Development of the Mexican working class north of the Rio Bravo : work and culture among laborers and artisans, 1600-1900. Los Angeles: Chicano Studies Research Center Publications, University of California, Los Angeles. ISBN 0-89551-055-3.
- Gómez-Quiñones, Juan (1990). Chicano politics: reality and promise, 1940-1990. Albuquerque: University of New Mexico Press. ISBN 0-8263-1204-7.
- Gómez-Quiñones, Juan (1994). Roots of Chicano politics, 1600-1940. Albuquerque: University of New Mexico Press. ISBN 0-8263-1471-6.
- Gómez-Quiñones, Juan (1994). Mexican American labor, 1790-1990. Albuquerque: University of New Mexico Press. ISBN 0-585-25942-9.
