= Jotería studies =

Interdisciplinary academic field centering queer Chicanx and Latinx experience

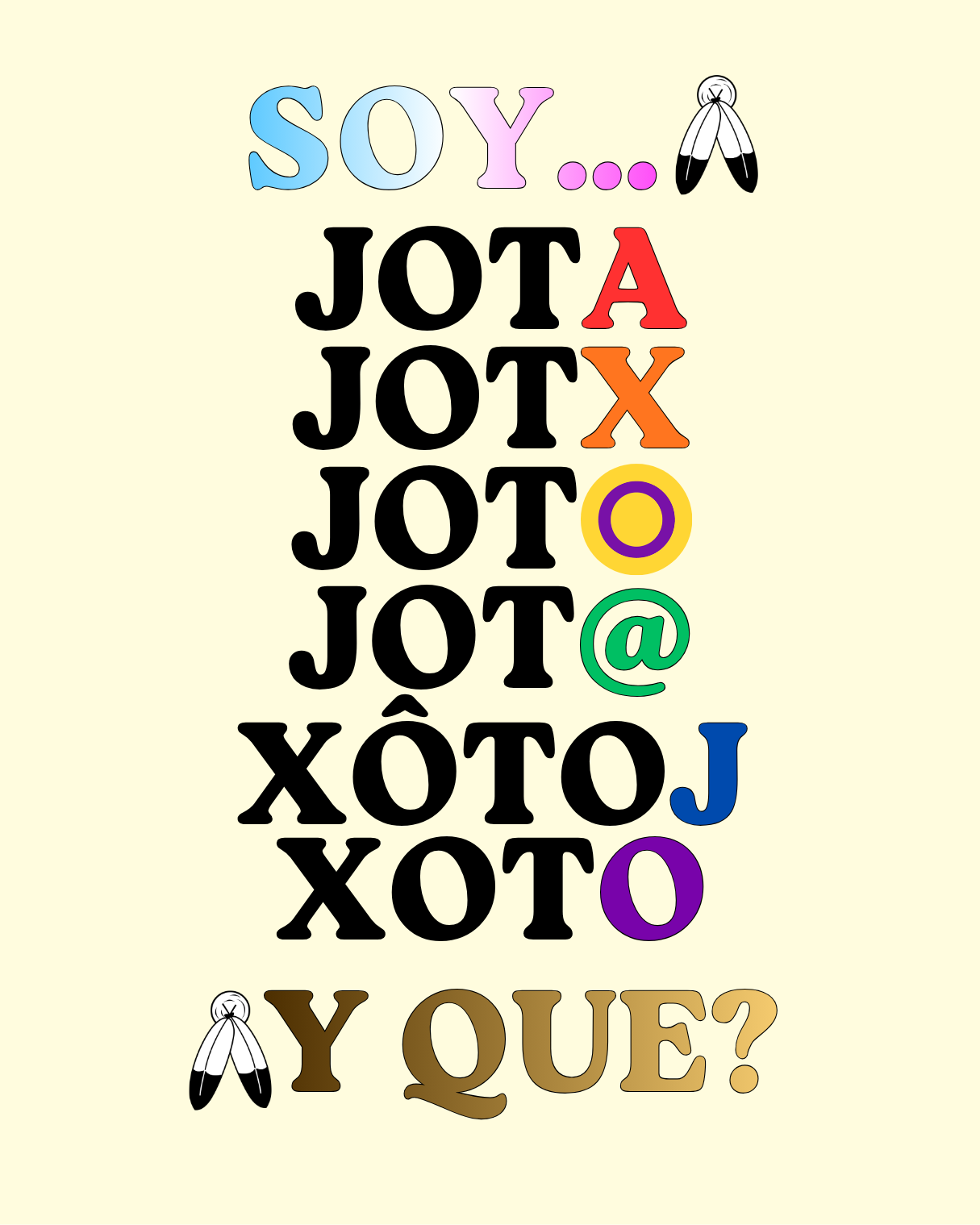
A graphic showing Pride centered around Joteria, in Spanish text saying "I am (a) ____, so what?".

Jotería studies is an interdisciplinary academic field that centers the experiences, epistemologies, and cultural production of queer, transgender, and travesti Chicanx and Latinx people. Rooted in Chicana feminist thought, ethnic studies, and queer of color critique, Jotería studies emerged from decades of scholarship, activism, and artistic practice and became formally institutionalized in the early 2010s with the founding of the Association for Jotería Arts, Activism, and Scholarship (AJAAS). The field takes its name from jotería, a term derived from the Spanish-language pejorative joto that has been reclaimed by queer Chicanx and Latinx communities as an affirmative identity and political category.

== Etymology and terminology ==
The word joto/a is a colloquial Spanish-language pejorative used in Mexico and in Mexican-Chicanx communities in the United States, historically applied as a slur to gay men and gender-nonconforming people, alongside related terms such as puto/a and maricón.

The origin of the word is uncertain, with proposed etymologies including the Nahuatl word xôtoj/xoto (meaning homosexual) and a connection to the Spanish letter jota ("J"). The historian Robert Buffington has proposed that the word derives from Jota, the name for Cell Block J of the Lecumberri federal penitentiary in Mexico City, where prison authorities segregated effeminate men beginning in the early twentieth century, giving rise to the term jotos for those held there; though the term appears in written sources as early as 1885, predating the prison's existence. The term emerged in Mexican Spanish during the late 19th century amid the criminalization and social condemnation of same-sex relations under the Porfirio Díaz era (1876–1911), becoming associated in popular culture with stereotypes linking male homosexuality with effeminacy, reinforced by machismo frameworks that stigmatized gender nonconformity. Since the late 20th century, joto and the derived term jotería have been reappropriated within Mexican and Chicanx LGBTQ+ communities.

Jotería as a collective noun refers to the community of queer and gender-nonconforming Chicanx and Latinx people. As a political and analytic concept, it functions similarly to the English-language term queer while remaining culturally and linguistically distinct. Scholars have emphasized that jotería cannot be reduced to a Spanish translation of queer or LGBT, arguing that it expresses how people exist within a broader social fabric of community, family, labor, and activism rather than isolating sexuality or gender from the other dimensions of social life. For some communities, the use of the reclaimed pejorative remains contested.

== Background and intellectual genealogy ==
=== Chicana feminism and Gloria Anzaldúa ===
The intellectual roots of Jotería studies extend to the Chicana feminist and 'third world feminist' movements of the 1960s, 1970s, and 1980s, including the work of Chicana lesbian feminists, transgender feministas, and collectives of queer Chicanas who were at the forefront of early consciousness-raising and political organizing. Scholars trace the field's origins to Chicana feminist theories, particularly the foundational contributions of Gloria Anzaldúa and Cherríe Moraga.

Anzaldúa's 1987 work Borderlands/La Frontera: The New Mestiza is considered a foundational text for the field. Her call within that work to "listen to what your jotería is saying" is cited by scholars as an early and explicit demand to center jotería epistemologies within Chicanx thought. Anzaldúa's theorizations of the borderlands, nepantla, and conocimiento have shaped the conceptual vocabulary of the field, and her collaboration with Moraga on the anthology This Bridge Called My Back (1981) helped establish the intellectual and political conditions from which Jotería studies emerged. Filmmaker and activist Osa Hidalgo de La Riva is also credited as an important early figure who contributed to the creative and philosophical foundation of jotería through her work in the Chicano movement.

=== Early queer Chicanx and Latinx scholarship ===
Publications and organizing by collectives in the early 1990s addressed the marginalization of queer people within both Chicano movement spaces and predominantly white LGBTQ organizations—including Emma Pérez's 1993 essay "Speaking from the Margin," which engaged sexuality and power from outside the mainstream of both Chicano nationalism and white feminist discourse. Scholarly work recognized as part of Jotería studies' intellectual lineage includes Tomás Almaguer's 1991 essay "Chicano Men: A Cartography of Homosexual Identity and Behavior," published in differences: A Journal of Feminist Cultural Studies. This earlier body of work belongs to the field's genealogy even when its authors did not frame their work explicitly as jotería.

== History and institutionalization ==
=== The Joto Caucus and NACCS ===
Beginning in the early 1990s, gay men within the National Association for Chicana and Chicano Studies (NACCS) began organizing informally, and in 1993 formally adopted the name Joto Caucus, creating an early formal space for queer Chicanx scholarship and organizing within a major academic association. Raúl Coronado is credited with calling for the first meeting of "Chicano jotos" at an early NACCS conference. Over subsequent years, the Joto Caucus and related Lesbian and Gay caucuses within NACCS grew and catalyzed a broader movement.

=== Association for Jotería Arts, Activism, and Scholarship ===
The Association for Jotería Arts, Activism, and Scholarship (AJAAS) was founded in 2011 and held its inaugural conference in 2012 at the University of New Mexico. AJAAS came directly from the Joto and Lesbian, Bi-Mujeres, and Transgender (LBMT) caucuses of NACCS and became the primary professional organization advancing jotería scholarship and practice across disciplines.

AJAAS supports emerging scholars through annual conferences and mentorship. In 2026, AJAAS held its fifteenth anniversary conference at the University of Utah, hosted by AJAAS co-chairs PJ DiPietro, Director of the LGBTQ Studies Program at Syracuse University, and Omi Salas-SantaCruz, assistant professor, and founder of the JOTA Lab (Justice-Oriented Teaching and Theories in the Academy) at the University of Utah.

=== 2014 Aztlán dossier ===
A defining point in the formal scholarly recognition of Jotería studies was the publication in Aztlán: A Journal of Chicano Studies of a dossier edited by Michael Hames-García, which included twelve articles that collectively gave formal scholarly recognition to Jotería studies as an emerging academic field. Hames-García's opening essay, "Jotería Studies, or the Political Is Personal," argued that jotería is not simply a Mexican or Chicanx equivalent of queer or LGBT, but a term with the capacity to hold together sexuality and gender with the full social fabric of a person's life, resisting what Hames-García described as capitalism's tendency to extract identity from community. Other essays in the dossier addressed jotería epistemology and a proposed research agenda (Daniel Enrique Pérez), jotería as a decolonizing political project (Xamuel Bañales), jotería identity and consciousness (Anita Tijerina Revilla and José Manuel Santillana), the aesthetics of jota/o healing and love (William Calvo-Quirós), and jotería pedagogy (Eddy Francisco Alvarez).

== Key concepts ==
=== Jotería identity and consciousness ===
Drawing on Chicana feminist consciousness-raising traditions and Revilla's earlier muxerista framework, scholars Anita Tijerina Revilla and José Manuel Santillana developed the concept of jotería identity and consciousness to describe how queer Chicanx and Latinx people develop political and communal self-understanding through shared experience and collective struggle. The concept has since been operationalized by researchers like Sergio A. Gonzalez in higher education studies exploring how queer Latinx students at predominantly white institutions develop belonging and political consciousness.

=== Jotería epistemology ===
Scholars have developed jotería epistemology as an approach to knowledge production that centers queer Chicanx and Latinx experience and challenges dominant frameworks that marginalize or render invisible jotería communities. Daniel Enrique Pérez's 2014 essay in the Aztlán dossier mapped a jotería research agenda explicitly as an epistemological project, proposing "jotería epistemologies" as a framework for producing knowledge from within jotería standpoints rather than about them. Omi Salas-SantaCruz has further developed these frameworks, arguing that nonbinary epistemologies within jotería and trans* Latinidades refuse colonial amnesia and the erasure of queer, trans Indigenous and Latinx ways of knowing; this work appeared in WSQ: Women's Studies Quarterly in 2023.

=== Jotería pedagogy ===
Jotería pedagogy refers to educational approaches that draw on jotería frameworks and ways of knowing to create transformative learning environments, centered on the diverse lived experiences of queer and trans Latinx people and oriented toward challenging the multiple forms of discrimination including homophobia, transphobia, and anti-immigrant hostility that shape those experiences. Eddy Francisco Alvarez Jr.'s 2014 essay in the Aztlán dossier outlined jotería pedagogy as drawing on Chicana feminist theory and Chela Sandoval's methodology of the oppressed as liberation practice. Scholars have extended jotería pedagogy in several directions: Tijerina Revilla and collaborators developed the Jotería-Muxerista pedagogical framework, centered on radical queer love, accountability, and the decolonization of education; and Ángel de Jesus González, Roberto C. Orozco, and Sergio A. Gonzalez theorized "queer pláticas" as a jotería-grounded qualitative research methodology for centering queer and trans Latinx knowledge in higher education. Scholars like Roberto C. Orozco, Sergio A. Gonzalez, and Antonio Duran have applied jotería pedagogy in higher education contexts to examine how educational institutions can be transformed to better support queer Latinx students.

=== Jotería as a decolonizing project ===
Xamuel Bañales theorized jotería as a decolonizing political project, arguing that jotería identities and practices challenge colonial logics of gender and sexuality as inseparable from racial exclusion, rather than treating them as separate axes of oppression. This decolonial dimension has been extended transnationally by PJ DiPietro, whose 2025 book Sideways Selves: Travesti and Jotería Struggles Across the Américas weaves together Jotería studies and Latin American travesti and trans theorizing to argue that the European-Christian colonial order of gender has suppressed Indigenous and Afro-diasporic ways of understanding embodiment. The book says travesti and jotería communities respond to these conditions through anticapitalist, care-affirming, decolonial knowledge, and practices founded on Transversalidad (transversality). It received the 2026 Sylvia Rivera Award in Transgender Studies from the Center for LGBTQ Studies (CLAGS) at the City University of New York.

== Relationship to other fields ==
Jotería studies situates itself in dialogue with several overlapping academic fields while insisting on the specificity of queer and trans Chicanx and Latinx experience that no single existing framework fully captures. It builds on and extends Chicana feminism, queer theory, and queer of color critique, while distinguishing itself from mainstream (predominantly white) queer studies. It does so on the grounds that jotería challenges the white gaze of mainstream queer studies and insists on the inseparability of race, ethnicity, sexuality, and gender.

Jotería studies has also been placed in conversation with Latinx Critical Race Theory (LatCrit). Scholars have proposed a synthesis termed Jotería LatCrit to reconcile the two frameworks: where LatCrit provides extensive historical methodologies for analyzing systemic oppression, Jotería studies contributes epistemological and identity-affirmative dimensions that LatCrit has historically lacked with respect to queer and trans experience. The field also engages with transgender studies; Francisco J. Galarte's work on trans inclusion has argued that Jotería studies must attend more carefully to the "lived realities" of trans* Chicanx people, pushing the field to challenge the gender binaries that conventional Chicano and queer studies frameworks have often assumed. Jotería studies has also engaged with new media and communications studies; scholars have applied jotería frameworks to the analysis of queer Chicanx digital art and visual culture as sites of political resistance and knowledge production.

== Extensions of the field ==
Scholars have extended Jotería studies beyond its original Chicanx and Mexican-American focus in several directions. Building on Jotería studies, scholars have worked to center Afro-Latinx and Afro-Indigenous queer and trans individuals, whose experiences are distinct from and not fully captured by frameworks anchored to mainstream Chicanx and Mexican-American experience.

DiPietro's Sideways Selves (2025) extended Jotería studies beyond the U.S.-Mexico borderlands through an ethnographic and philosophical study of Aymara, Kolla, and mixed-race travesti communities in Buenos Aires and K'iche', Nahua, and Central American gender-nonconforming migrants in the San Francisco Bay Area, developing a hemispheric framework attentive to Indigenous and Afro-diasporic knowledge traditions.

== See also ==
- Chicana feminism
- Gloria Anzaldúa
- Borderlands/La Frontera: The New Mestiza
- Queer of color critique
- LGBTQ studies
- Chicano studies
- Latinx studies
- Queer theory
- National Association for Chicana and Chicano Studies
- Trans*
