= María Guillermina Valdes Villalva =

Chicana scholar and activist

- Born: Maria Guillermina Valdes; December 15, 1939; El Paso, Texas, US
- Died: September 11, 1991 (aged 51)
- Education: University of Texas at El Paso, University of Michigan
- Occupations: Scholar and activist
- Known for: Establishing organizations for workers in maquiladoras and for her pioneering scholarship in border studies.
- Spouse: Antonio Villalva Sosa 1963
- Children: 3

María Guillermina (Guille) Valdes Villalva (also known as Guillermina Valdez de Villalva or Villalba, December 15, 1939 – September 11, 1991) was a Chicana scholar and activist born in El Paso, Texas. She was considered an "authority" and "pioneer" on researching United States-Mexico border issues and had a "lifelong commitment to social justice."

== Biography ==
Villalva was the daughter of a physician, Luis Valdes, and her mother was Ninfa Teobald. She attended Loretto Academy, graduating in 1958. In 1969, she received a B.A. in sociology from the University of Texas at El Paso (UTEP). Later, she earned a master's degree in psychology from UTEP. Her PhD in social psychology was from the University of Michigan. At the University of Michigan, she was influenced by the works of Paolo Freire and Erich Fromm. She was married to Antonio Villalva Sosa in 1963 in the Sacred Heart Church in Ciudad Juárez. After her marriage, they honeymooned in Mexico City and Acapulco and then settled in Juárez. Together they had three children, a son and two daughters. Villalva became very religious after a serious illness led to her being hospitalized in Houston, Texas. A former atheist, she had a religious conversion after her recovery. She became involved with the Catholic charismatic renewal.

Villava's research focused on "the maquiladoras industry on the United States-Mexico border" and its impact on the working class. Villalva taught at UTEP and also at the University of Ciudad Juárez. Over the years, Villava mentored many other scholars in her area of study. In 1968, Villalva saw that with a growing population of working women in Mexico (around 53 percent of women working in Juarez were the sole supporters of their families) that there was a need for places for them to meet and learn additional skills. She mentions that at first, when the maquiladoras came to Juárez, there was an expectation that only men would be hired; instead mostly young women were given jobs. Villalva's research discovered that many of the women who were coming to work in maquiladoras or twin plants in El Paso and Juárez were from rural areas and learning to live in what was essentially a new culture was not easy. Villava and others began to work towards creating an organization that would help young women adjust to a new life. She and others conducted the research necessary to lay the foundation for the creation of women's worker groups in Ciudad Juárez.

Villava helped organize and co-found several organizations, the first of which was the non-profit Centro de Orientacion para la Mujer Obrera (COMO and also known as Woman Worker Orientation Center). The first COMO was located in a public building in Colonia Exhipódromo in Ciudad Juárez. Villalva had obtained the building by petitioning President Luis Echeverría on his visit to Juárez. Villalva helped initiate social change through COMO, including developing union-like worker cooperatives. COMO also helped support workers in their efforts to strike for better working conditions. Other times, COMO took complaints of hazardous working conditions to the press or even to court. The first COMO was considered a pilot program and was run by Villalva, an assistant director, Maria Elena Alvarado, a nurse, Maria Elena Villegas, and Rosario Rosales and Delia Puga, both social workers. In addition to these employees, COMO also had a volunteer staff of about 27 people. Within the first two years, about 300 women attended classes at the COMO each year. The COMO's classes were designed to raise "working women's consciousness" which had been discontinued by maquiladora management because those who attended became "too critical of health and safety conditions." Many of the classes taught at COMO focused on self-improvement, such as learning English, dance, and sewing and also on community improvement, such as nutrition, psychology, family relations and responsible parenthood. In exchange for the free classes, the women committed themselves to volunteering in the community and using the knowledge they'd learned to teach others. Villalva was "exceptionally charismatic" and was able to act as a bridge between working women and corporate and official forms of power. She was also able to obtain half a million dollars between 1978 and 1980 for COMO through the Inter-American Foundation (IAF). For Villalva, it was important that working in a factory not become a "dehumanizing" experience for the workers.

This first COMO also became a center for coordinating various co-op programs for the unemployed, both men and women. She also helped create jobs for the men in the area by helping to create a recycling cooperative in 1972. Villalva and others had witnessed people living in shanty towns outside of the dump with no way to support themselves. The recycling co-op had scavengers in the dump turning in items that could be recycled for money. Items of need were provided for free outside the dump a small store called "The Lord's Store." In addition, Villalva also educated the scavengers at the dump.

By 1980, COMO centers were set to be established in Puerto Rico and San Jose, California. COMO became a center not just for workers in Juárez, but also around the world. COMO's impact can also be measured in the effect it had on the lives of many of the participants in the program, who were women with an average age of twenty-two. Women who participated in the improving classes had a measurable and greater sense of personal empowerment that differed greatly from the "stereotype of the ideal Mexican female" in the 1980s. Many of the women involved in COMO became leaders in their communities and at work.

In 1985, Villalva was involved with bringing attention to the press about a dangerous contamination affecting workers in a metal foundry. Over 193 workers suffered from various symptoms ranging from neurological disorders to sterility because they had been exposed to radioactive cobalt 60. In 1985 she also spoke as an expert in border studies in Washington, D.C. at a congressional hearing involving immigration changes, where she stated that the new immigration bill would cause many Mexicans to lose their jobs.

In 1988, Villalva was the general director of external affairs for the Colegio de la Frontera Norte (Colef). Colef and Villava were supportive of the civil movement surrounding violence against women in Northern Mexico, especially in Juárez.

In 1975, Villalva was awarded the Loretto Academy's Alumnae award for outstanding service. In 1983, Villalva received the Mary Rhodes Award for her accomplishments in working towards social justice.

She was a keynote speaker at the 1988 National Association for Chicano Studies (NACS) conference where she spoke on the maturation of Chicana/o studies as an academic field.

Villalva died in an airplane crash on September 11, 1991. She was flying to Houston from Laredo on a commuter plane, Continental Express Flight 2574, to attend the graduation of her daughter.
