= Mujeres Activas en Letras y Cambio Social =

- Abbreviation: MALCS
- Formation: 1982, 41 years ago
- Founder: Ada Rosa- Riddell
- Purpose: To actively create, promote, and support the education and leadership of Chicana, Latina, Afro-Latina, non-conforming people, and indigenous women.
- Headquarters: 1404 66th St., Berkeley, CA 94702
- Website: https://malcs.org/

Mujeres Activas en Letras Y Cambio Social (MALCS) is an inclusive organization of Chicana, Latina, Native American and gender non-conforming academics, students, and activists. MALCS focuses on recognizing the hard work of contributors to the organization, giving women access to higher education, and educating society about the issues they face. MALCS was established in 1982 at the University of California, Davis after noticing no change was being made during the Chicano Movement despite their activism efforts. To continue their efforts in unifying women, they provide membership opportunities and benefits such as access to their summer institute and their peer-reviewed journal: Chicana/Latina Studies which talks about the experiences of Latina women. This organization helps bring them together to share their thoughts, opinions, and information about things they want to work on, current issues, or anything. They also bring together their research and community involvement to create social change. It is a safe space for everyone to uplift and support one another.

== Organization ==
MALCS also provides articles and news updates to keep their community informed.

== History ==
=== Formation ===
MALCS was established in 1982 as a result of the lack of Latina women in higher education and the overall lack of unequal access to education. Not to mention how Chicanos believed that creating more educational opportunities would challenge the system. Chicana women were huge contributors to the Chicano Movement, yet their efforts were barely acknowledged thereby creating a space where women could come together and share their perspectives and ideas to change society. The founder, Adaljiza Sosa-Riddel, was an early advocate for Chicanas and wanted to start fighting for these changes along with historian, Antonia Castaneda. Another historian Cynthia Orozco, helped organize the first Southern California MALCS meeting at Pomona College. MALCS formed its first declaration a year after its establishment which confirmed the organization and affirmed its dedication to standing up for Chicanas and their activism. The declaration mentions and recognizes working families and their struggles which is the inspiration of many to fight race, class, and gender oppression.

MALCS has chapters at several universities, the first such chapter being founded at the University of Texas at San Antonio by Antonia Castaneda. The organisation has gone on to create its own journal, Chicana/Latina Studies.

=== Historical context ===
==== Chicano movement ====
The Chicano movement happened during the 1960s and was inspired by the Black civil rights movement. Its whole purpose was to fight against the oppression and inequality the government was placing upon them. Some of the struggles they were facing were improving working conditions for farm workers, low wages, segregation, and discrimination, improving the education system for minorities, having a voice and representation in politics, and much more.

==== National Association of Chicana and Chicano Studies (NACCS) ====
This organization has academic programs, departments, and research centers that focus on issues that affect Mexican Americans, Chicanos, and Latinas. They were formed in 1972 during the Chicano Movement demanding for there to be more opportunities in higher education so that they can express their talents and get to where they want to be. Without this organization and many others, our history would continue to be ignored or whitened. There are so many issues within the Hispanic community that are overlooked and schools don't do a good job of including our history in the curriculum. Organizations like NACCS make an effort to educate society on our history so that we can learn and improve from it. Additionally, NACCS hosts an annual conference where they give presenters a chance to submit a proposal about issues within the Chicana and Chicano studies along with their own perspectives and approaches about different topics. Yet, it was different for women as they didn't have a place in these conferences, and men consistently ignored and excluded the issues women faced which showed how this movement did not care about gender equality. It was not until women challenged this such as MALCS meeting with NACCS to address heteropatriarchal institutional violence and focus more on Chicana feminist figures and overall having more gender-based issues in Chicana/o studies.

==== Chicanas in the Movimiento ====
The Chicano Movement was a step closer to achieving equality and justice, they gained recognition for their efforts to the problems they were facing. Yet, that sense of unity and community was not felt by women, they felt they were not a part of this. Although Chicanos fought for the same rights, women were excluded and were hardly advocated for due to the male leadership in the movement. Some of the requests they made but were ignored included reproductive rights, equal labor, and having Chicana feminist role models or representation. The main reason is that Chicanos and Mexicans believed in their traditional gender roles and patriarchal system, so to them, women were supposed to be submissive and follow these roles. Anything women tried to do to break the roles in the movement was seen as going against the cause and causing a divide between their own people. The movement focused on racism and oppression which affected everyone, but it was almost like men wanted women to focus on these forces and ignore their own personal issues. So, they had to choose between fighting for their own people or womanhood. Everything Chicanos gained from the Chicano movement was not equally distributed to women, leaving them no space to use their voices to fight for the things that matter to them. There was also no opportunity for them to reach a higher audience and gain a higher status because of the lack of network and women leadership roles. To have an end to this, Chicana women made efforts to make their voices heard and have a spot in the movement by dismantling traditional gender roles and machismo since they should also get the same recognition. Those efforts included forming Chicana organizations that fought for a spot in the movement believing they could make great contributions to the overall cause. More specifically, to fight against women's oppression within the community. MALCS was formed and was inspired by some of these organizations such as the Comisión Femenil Mexicana Nacional and National Association of Chicana and Chicano Studies as well as feminist figures like Dolores Huerta and Martha P. Cotera.

== Related Chicana organizations ==
=== Comision Femenil Mexicana Nacional ===
It is important to highlight those organizations that helped MALCS and many other important feminist organizations become what they are now. The Comisión Femenil Mexicana Nacional is a non-profit organization that focuses on improving and enhancing the lives of Latinas in every aspect. They were founded in 1970 during the Chicano Movement at California State University, Northridge, first named the "Mujeres de la Raza." They became known for raising issues about women and families at the National Chicano Issues Conference, yet the delegates at the conference believed those issues were not much of importance since they concerned mostly women. This encouraged women to create their own organizations to have leadership positions in the Chicano Movement and address their problems without having to deal with male sexism or any other obstacle. The commission now contributes to the success of Latina women by helping them get scholarships, and encouraging them to explore the college and career path. and promoting activism. They also host their annual Adelante Mujer Latina Career Conference which gives high school students the opportunity to learn about the different careers from the experiences of Latina professionals. This organization is very important as young Latina women don't have access to these opportunities like others, it can help them progress in society and become what they want.

=== Mujeres Por La Raza Unida ===
The Mujeres Por La Raza was derived from the Raza Unida Party which focused on having more Mexican representation in political elections but also wanted to help recognize the issues women faced and the contributions they made within the party. Martha P. Cotera and other Chicana LRUP members created this other party which raised awareness of having more women engaged in politics. Since the Chicano Movement was led more by male leaders, they believed there was so much to do and many opportunities to look forward to, so the only way to get there was by including women. Including women in the movement, provided more understanding of our history and with more input from everyone, it could lead to making a difference and having better outcomes in the overall Chicano Movement.

== Current activities ==
=== Chicana/Latina Studies Journal ===
One of the many ways MALCS stays active in advocating for women is through their creative journal Chicana/Latina Studies. This journal consists of different experiences and perspectives from women who want to share with others their creative work and inspire others to do the same. The journal gives the opportunity for them to submit articles, reviews, commentary, creative writing, and art either in English or Spanish. Currently, there are 22 volumes of the journal dating from 1997 to 2023. Their most current issue is from Fall 2022 which includes a lot of stories from Latina, LGBTQ+, and indigenous women that talk about real issues that we face and struggle to put an end to it. For example, Adriana Dominguez wrote "Jarabe" which was about a girl named Sarai who was a Folkloric dancer who loved performing for her mom and creating dance memories with her. Although the script was written as a memory since things haven't been the same ever since her mom got deported and didn't get to see her one last time. This highlights how the immigration system impacts families through separation, detention centers, racism, and much more, and can't improve to better the lives of many who come to the United States.

=== MALCS Summer Institute ===
MALCS Summer Institute is celebrating 40 years of activism and transformative work done by those involved in MALCS. They are hosted in different locations every year and have a different theme each time along with inviting hosts to talk about their stories, experiences, and efforts to fight injustices. The theme for 2023 was "La Lucha Sigue for Racial, Reproductive, and Decolonial Justice" which focused on encouraging women to come forward and talk about their work and practices. The Summer Institutes ensure that there is activism, scholarship, knowledge, and community involvement to thrive and fight the violence, inequalities, and power imbalances.

== Notable members and contributors ==
- Deena J. González
