= Catalina Amuedo-Dorantes =

Spanish economist and professor

Academic background
- Education: Universidad de Granada; Universidad de Sevilla; Western Michigan University

Academic work
- Institutions: San Diego State University; University of California, Merced
- Website: sites.ucmerced.edu/amuedo-dorantes

Catalina Amuedo-Dorantes is a Spanish economist, a Professor in the Economics and Business Management faculty at the University of California, Merced and a Professor and Department Chair at San Diego State University. Since 2015, she has been the Western Representative for a standing committee called the Committee for the Status of Women in the Economics Profession (CSWEP). Her field of work focuses on the fundamentals of labour economics and international migration, particularly the nature of immigration policies and its impact on migrant's assimilation into the community at a state and local level. Amuedo-Dorantes has published multiple articles in refereed journals including Journal of Public Economics, Journal of Population Economics, International Migration, and Journal of Development Economics.

== Education and work ==
Catalina Amuedo-Dorantes first earned a B.A. for the English Language at the University of Granada in 1986. Remaining in Spain, she also completed her B.A. for the French Language and Economics at University of Seville in 1992. Amuedo-Dorantes became an associate teacher for the department of Economic Theory and Political Economy upon completing her degrees. Following this, she moved to Michigan to complete her M.A. in Economics at Western Michigan University in 1995 and her Ph. D in Applied Economics three years later. In 2006, she got promoted from assistant professor to associate professor at San Diego State University, and finally professor in 2006. Within this span of time, Amuedo-Dorantes was also elected as department chair of the Economics department until 2018.

Since 2015, she has been a research fellow at the IZA Institute of Labor Economics, and has published articles on Policy Assimilation and its implications for Fertility, Education, and Labor Supply. She has also contributed to IZA World of Labor and has written on the topic of remittances. As a board member of the Committee for the Status of Women in the Economics Profession (CSWEP), she works to address the low representation of women in the Economics Profession and promotes the awareness of Women's issues in the field such as participation on editorial boards of Academic Journals. Following her field of research, Amuedo-Dorantes also took on a research position at the Centre for Research and Analysis of Migration (CReAM) mainly focused on new methodological advances to assess policy issues.

== Research and selected publications ==
=== "Immigration Enforcement and Economic Resources of Children with Likely Unauthorized Parents" (2018) ===
Catalina Amuedo-Dorantes, Esther Arenas-Arroyo, and Almudena Sevilla addressed the role of greater interior immigration enforcement in changing the likelihood of U.S. born children with a likely unauthorized parent to live a life in poverty through the change of economic sources. With focus on mix-status households, Amuedo-Dorantes et al. used household data from 2005 to 2011 American Community Survey (ACS) and found that with a one standard deviation increase in the intensity of the enforcement raised the overall likelihood of that U.S. born child with a likely unauthorized parent by a total of 4% and decreased income. Life in poverty can be defined as direct employment restrictions, fear of apprehension, and deportation in this context. One type of immigration law, police-based measures, particularly enhanced negative impacts of immigration enforcement on the economic resources, and increases overall poverty risk.

=== "Welfare Reform and Immigrant Fertility" (2016) ===
Immigration policies had always been an important debate at the Government frontline. Catalina Amuedo-Dorantes, Susan L. Averett, and Cynthia A. Bansak obtained data from the Current Population Survey collected in 1994, 1995, 1998, and 2000 to examine whether immigrant women adjusted their childbearing as a response to how generous the Government was with its welfare benefits, following the 1996 Personal Responsibility and Work Opportunity Act (PRWORA) which reduced immigrant eligibility and welfare participation. Amuedo-Dorantes et al. found that noncitizen that we're not offered state-level benefits, such as food assistance, had reduced fertility rate.

=== "Accounting For Remittance and Migration Effects on Children's Schooling" (2010) ===
Catalina Amuedo-Dorantes and Susan Pozo examined the relationship between remittances and family migration and its impact on children's school attendance in a study conducted in the Dominican Republic. Amuedo-Dorantes and Pozo chose the Dominican Republic for two reasons, various emigration and remittance-receiving patterns which allow for isolation between the remittance and migration effects. By obtaining from two samples, non-migrant and migrant households, they found that a 10% increase in remittances receipt increased children's school attendance by 3%. However, the overall effect of the remittance effect may disappears due to the overpowering negative impact of the migration effect in play. Amuedo-Dorantes and Pozo expanded on the hardships of emigration and its impact on children's responsibility within the household. It is believed that policies aimed to increase remittance flows would further improve the countries impacted by migration out of the country.

=== "Labour Market Assimilation of Recent Immigrants in Spain" (2007) ===
Through the data of the 2001 population census and the 2002 Earnings Structure Survey for Spain, Catalina Amuedo-Dorantes and Sara de la Rica examined immigrants' employment assimilation and assimilation occupation-wise of immigrants working in Spain. Increasing levels of immigration in Spain allowed Amuedo-Dorantes and Rica to successfully distinguish variations by gender, origin, and educational achievement of immigrant employment and occupational assimilation. Multiple findings were obtained:

1. immigrant men and women were far less likely than local men and women to be employed,
2. EU15 immigrants seemed to attain similar occupational patterns as natives while non-EU15 and their native counterparts were separated by an occupational attainment gap, and
3. low-educated male immigrants and only males, reached a slower occupational assimilation than their counterparts. They emphasized on the importance of policy making and its impact for immigrants assimilation into the workforce through different filters.

=== Additional published academic work ===
- Amuedo-Dorantes, Catalina; Lozano, Fernando A. (2018-10-17). "Interstate Mobility Patterns of Likely Unauthorized Immigrants: Evidence from Arizona". Journal of Economics, Race, and Policy. 2 (1–2): 109–120. doi:10.1007/s41996-018-0023-7. hdl:10419/161308. ISSN 2520-8411. S2CID 76652578.
- Amuedo-Dorantes, Catalina; Lozano, Fernando A. (2018-10-17). "Interstate Mobility Patterns of Likely Unauthorized Immigrants: Evidence from Arizona". Journal of Economics, Race, and Policy. 2 (1–2): 109–120. doi:10.1007/s41996-018-0023-7. hdl:10419/161308. ISSN 2520-8411. S2CID 76652578.
- Amuedo-Dorantes, Catalina; Sparber, Chad (November 2014). "In-state tuition for undocumented immigrants and its impact on college enrollment, tuition costs, student financial aid, and indebtedness". Regional Science and Urban Economics. 49: 11–24. Bibcode:2014RSUE...49...11A. doi:10.1016/j.regsciurbeco.2014.07.010. hdl:10419/67243. ISSN 0166-0462. S2CID 154545653.
- Amuedo-Dorantes, Catalina; Puttitanun, Thitima (2014). "Remittances and immigration enforcement". IZA Journal of Migration. 3 (1): 6. doi:10.1186/2193-9039-3-6. hdl:10.1186/2193-9039-3-6. ISSN 2193-9039.
- Amuedo-Dorantes, Catalina; Sevilla, Almudena (2014). "Low-Skilled Immigration and Parenting Investments of College-Educated Mothers in the United States: Evidence from Time-Use Data" (PDF). Journal of Human Resources. 49 (3): 509–539. doi:10.1353/jhr.2014.0018. hdl:10419/80662. ISSN 1548-8004. S2CID 28415903.
- Amuedo-Dorantes, Catalina; Pozo, Susan (2014-03-19). "Remittance income uncertainty and asset accumulation". IZA Journal of Labor & Development. 3 (1) 3. doi:10.1186/2193-9020-3-3. hdl:10419/152378. ISSN 2193-9020.
- "Remittance Income Volatility and Labor Supply in Mexico" with Susan Pozo. Southern Economic Journal, 2012, 72(2): 257–76.
- Amuedo-Dorantes, Catalina; De la Rica, Sara (2010-01-14). "Immigrants' responsiveness to labor market conditions and their impact on regional employment disparities: evidence from Spain". SERIEs. 1 (4): 387–407. doi:10.1007/s13209-009-0002-y. hdl:10419/77728. ISSN 1869-4187.
- Amuedo-Dorantes, Catalina; Bansak, Cynthia; Raphael, Steven (April 2007). "Gender Differences in the Labor Market: Impact of IRCA's Amnesty Provisions". American Economic Review. 97 (2): 412–416. doi:10.1257/aer.97.2.412. ISSN 0002-8282.
- Amuedo-Dorantes, Catalina; Serrano-Padial, Ricardo (October 2007). "Wage Growth Implications of Fixed-Term Employment: An Analysis by Contract Duration and Job Mobility". Labour Economics. 14 (5): 829–847. doi:10.1016/j.labeco.2006.09.001. ISSN 0927-5371. S2CID 15722315.
- Amuedo-Dorantes, Catalina; De la Rica, Sara (2006-01-21). "The Role of Segregation and Pay Structure on the Gender Wage Gap: Evidence from Matched Employer-Employee Data for Spain". Contributions in Economic Analysis & Policy. 5 (1). doi:10.2202/1538-0645.1498. ISSN 1538-0645.
- Amuedo-Dorantes, Catalina; Kimmel, Jean (March 2005). "?The Motherhood Wage Gap for Women in the United States: The Importance of College and Fertility Delay?". Review of Economics of the Household. 3 (1): 17–48. doi:10.1007/s11150-004-0978-9. ISSN 1569-5239. S2CID 15210402.
- Amuedo-Dorantes, Catalina (November 2014). "?The good and the bad in remittance flows?". doi:10.15185/izawol.97. hdl:10419/125317.

== Awards and recognition ==
- 1994-1995: Elias Harik Award, Western Michigan University
- 2002: Literari Awards for Excellence: paper published in the International Journal of Manpower
- 2013-2014: Border Fulbright Garcia-Robles Scholar
- 2020: Outstanding Achievement Award, American Society of Hispanic Economists
