= Chicano studies =

Scholarly field

Chicano studies, also known as Chicano/a studies, Chican@ studies, or Xicano studies originates from the Chicano Movement of the late 1960s and 1970s, and is the study of the Chicano and Latino experience. Chicano studies draws upon a variety of fields, including history, sociology, the arts, and Chicano literature. The area of studies additionally emphasizes the importance of Chicano educational materials taught by Chicano educators for Chicano students.

In many universities across the United States, Chicano studies is linked with other ethnic studies, such as black studies, Asian American studies, and Native American studies. Many students who have studied anthropology have also been involved in varying degrees of Chicano studies. Today, most major universities in areas of high Chicano concentration have a formal Chicano/a studies department or interdisciplinary program. Providing Chicano studies to Chicano students has helped these students find a community which offers a curriculum that is unique to their own heritage.

== Background ==
The establishment of Chicano studies in colleges and universities was in response to fundamental issues in the American educational system and how many Chicanos felt excluded from educational success in the United States. Specifically, one of the issues that led to the establishment of Chicano studies was how Mexican-Americans, and in turn the greater Latino community, were represented negatively in American history. An example where Mexican Americans were portrayed negatively in American history is during the 19th century, when the territories of New Mexico and Arizona were not allowed to become states until there were more people of European descent living there to balance out the Mexican Americans, who were thought of as lazy, talentless idlers. It also must be noted that these stereotypes have continued throughout the 20th and 21st centuries. Additionally, Chicano scholars such as Felipe de Ortego y Gasca claim that Mexican Americans are not seen as vital parts of general American history, but neglect to remember that after historical treaties such as the Treaty of Guadalupe Hidalgo of 1848, land originally belonging to Mexico has been a part of the United States for an extended period of time, and that those of Mexican descent have been "American" for over 160 years. Therefore, many Chicano scholars feel the need to have necessary programming that restructures the way in which Mexican-Americans are perceived in American education. Another reason for Chicano studies was that traditionally Mexican Americans had been exposed to "Western" culture and European history through the standard educational system, but those of European descent had never had to learn Mexican history or the history of Mexican Americans. Additionally, the little material the European-American community was taught about Mexican Americans was framed in the context of European-American narratives, in other words meaning that the historical focus was not placed on Mexican Americans and Mexican Americans were often portrayed negatively. For that reason, Chicano studies was created to combat traditional education that excludes Mexican-American history and furthers harmful stereotypes about Mexican Americans.

Furthermore, Chicano studies was created to ensure Chicano students have access to Chicano education that is taught by Chicanos. In addition to the exclusion of Mexican-American narratives in American education and the negative perceptions of Mexican Americans, professors and educators in higher education were rarely Chicano. Even at the nascency of Chicano studies, the first teachers of this material were the only Chicano professors at the institution. Therefore, another reason Chicano studies was implemented at colleges and universities was to ensure diversity in the faculty of higher education and to demonstrate to Chicano students that professional careers surrounding education can be an option for them as well.

== History ==
=== 1960s ===
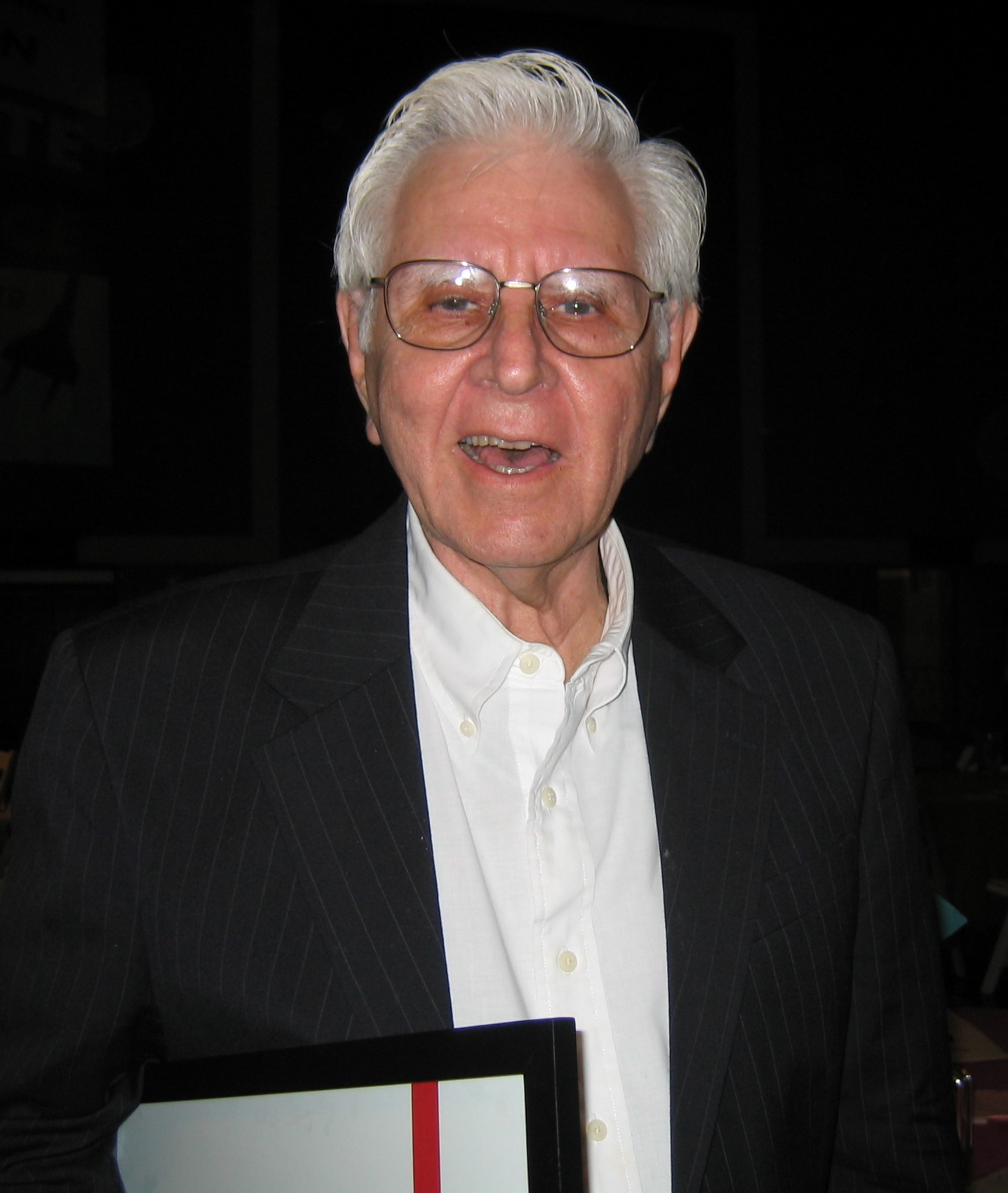
Rudy Acuña's work emphasizes the struggle of the Mexican American people.

Many Chicano scholars agree that Chicano studies came about as a result of the Chicana@ student movements, whether they were in the form of protests, activism or just taking part in el movimiento, also known as the Chicano movement. Chicano studies was seen as a way to advance Mexican American perspectives on culture, history and literature. The major push for universities and colleges to include Chicano studies came within the context of the African-American civil rights struggle. During the 1960s, Mexican American educators demanded that colleges and universities address the pedagogical needs of Mexican American students. Scholar Rodolfo Acuña noted that this was especially important because Mexican American student populations grew significantly in the 1960s. In addition, many young people and students were becoming very politically active and began to organize for political causes. A student organization that grew out of the civil rights movements of the '60s was the Mexican American Youth Organization (MAYO), which began to work towards educational reform. MAYO was very active in promoting student walkouts in Texas and California to highlight problems that Mexican American students faced. As students became more organized, they began to develop "experimental colleges" where informal classes on topics important to the Chicano movement were taught.

In 1963, Manuel H. Guerra, professor at the University of Southern California and chair of the Mexican American Political Association's (MAPA) Education Committee, reported on "serious discriminatory policies and practices" at his university in relation to hiring Mexican Americans, especially considering that there had been an increase in the number of Mexican American students. According to scholar Rodolfo Acuña, serving Mexican American students without providing Mexican American faculty was considered a sort of colonialism and cultural assimilation. In addition, many Mexican American students were put at a disadvantage because speaking Spanish (even outside of class) was considered "degrading" or "un-American." Opportunities such as the Educational Opportunity Program (EOP) helped increase the number of minorities entering colleges and universities. Educators and students alike began to visualize "an academic program that could serve and transform the Mexican American community," a program that would become Chicano studies and which was built by and for Chicanos.

In 1967, anthropologist Octavio Romano and Nick C. Vaca, in addition to graduate students at the University of California, Berkeley, began to publish a Chicano studies journal called El Grito: A Journal of Contemporary Mexican-American Thought. Many of the ideas surrounding the formation of later Chicano studies programs stemmed from this publication. One major idea that was put forth in El Grito by its editors was that Mexican Americans, in contrast to other ethnic groups, have kept their Mexican-American culture intact and have "refused to disappear into The Great American Melting Pot." The consequence of this, said the editors, was that Mexican Americans were kept in an economically and politically impoverished state. Also in 1967, political scientist Ralph Guzmán conducted a study with the Los Angeles State College which laid the foundation for a national center of Mexican American studies at California State College, Los Angeles (CSCLA). Both Mexican American and Black Student Unions pressed CSCLA to have ethnic studies classes at this time.

The Plan de Santa Barbara is generally considered to be the manifesto of Chicano studies. Drafted in 1969 at the University of California, Santa Barbara, the plan emphasizes the need for education, and especially higher education to enact Chicano community empowerment. The Plan helped to "establish Chicana/o studies as an entity incorporated into the structures of academia." However, while the Plan articulated a need for education, it did not specify how to create a program of study. The Plan did, however, lead to the creation of the Chicano Studies Institute in 1969. Another important document in Chicano studies was also produced in 1969. In March 1969, the Chicano Youth Conference held in Denver produced a plan written by Chicano poet, Alurista. It was called El Plan Espiritual de Aztlán (The Spiritual Plan of Aztlán) and it contains a concept of "ethnic nationalism and self-determination." The idea of the mythic homeland of the Aztec people, Aztlán, is one that unifies the United States and Mexico and correspondingly, united Mexican Americans with a sense of nationalism.

=== 1970s ===
In 1970, the first volume of Aztlán: A Journal of Chicano Studies was published by students at the University of California, Los Angeles (UCLA). Aztlán had a big influence on the discourse surrounding Chicano studies and was the reason behind the founding of many Chicano studies in colleges and universities. The name of the journal came directly from El Plan Espiritual de Aztlán and under the direction of the historian Juan Gomez-Quiñones, the journal supported and sustained a culture of activism. Chicano scholars in 1970 also wrote papers for the Chicano Studies Institute which were later published in the journal, Epoca. These papers addressed topics such as Chicano curriculum, goals of the educational program and how to achieve academic recognition.

In 1973, the University of California, Berkeley recognized the need to provide quality library materials to support the Chicano studies programs, and in a more general sense to have academic spaces for Chicano studies and Chicano students. Researchers began to study the impact that these new programs had on students, finding that Mexican-American students responded positively to Chicano studies and also to bilingual classes. Many scholars felt that the philosophy of education in the United States at the time was "inconsistent with the values of the Chicano movement" and that Chicano studies needed to create tools for students to use in the real world and also a new type of research to solve problems. It was also important to find ways to recruit Chicano teachers and administration within the schools to support students and research. Further support for Chicano studies came in the form of the National Association of Chicana and Chicano Studies (NACCS) which was created in 1972 in San Antonio, Texas. The NACCS allows scholars in Chicano studies to exchange ideas, share research, communicate, and it also has an annual conference. The conferences were important to help bring together scholars and legitimize Chicano studies, since other disciplines have similar annual conferences. Through these conferences and the many other initiatives organized by Chicano students and educators, many Chicano studies programs were in place at major universities by 1975.

=== 1980s ===
Chicano studies went through structural shifts in its message and mission during the late 1970s and 1980s. During this period, Chicano studies began to include women, the LGBTQ+ community, and other minority groups under the umbrella of "Chicano" while also acknowledging the many differences within the group. In 1981, the Mexican American Studies and Research Center (MASRC) at the University of Arizona was established. In 2009, MASRC became a department and continued public policy research and addressing issues of concern to Mexican American communities. As of 2019, MASRC is now known as the Department of Mexican American Studies and offers bachelor's degrees, master's degrees, and a Ph.D. degree in Mexican American Studies. The idea of the "borderland" or nepantla grew stronger than the idea of Aztlán by the 1980s and Chicanos celebrated the many different (often conflicting) aspects of themselves. Borderlands/La Frontera: The New Mestiza (1987) by Gloria Anzaldúa both grew out of and signifies this change. Chicano studies became less about nationalism, and more about belonging to a group and contributing to "something greater." This shift helped reshape the mission of Chicano studies and gave it "new life" and "new authority."

The 1980s saw more Chicano studies programs integrated into institutions of higher learning while it also created a "canonical approach" to its studies and "gatekeeping procedures" to evaluate promotions and tenure. In addition, Chicano studies programs helped universities and colleges fulfill affirmative action requirements. During the mid-1990s, however, a study found that most Chicano studies programs were still very non-uniform. Part of the reason that many Chicano studies programs were not consistent in what was studied is that a core curriculum had not yet been formally published. The first primer of Chicano studies was published in 1980 by Diego Vigil, called From Indians to Chicanos: A Sociocultural History. In addition, there was a lack of Chicano faculty with only 1.2% of faculty at U.S. colleges and universities having any "Hispanic" ethnicity at all in 1985. Many of the faculty teaching Chicano studies didn't feel that their own programs were "qualitatively sound."

=== 2010s ===
In 2017, scholar S. M. Contreras noted a change in the language surrounding Chicano people, as they have begun to add an "X" or an "@" in place of the "o" or "a/o". This new language is a result of the movement towards gender inclusivity and as a way to recognize Chicano people whose gender identity does not coincide with the gender binary.

== Ideological approaches ==
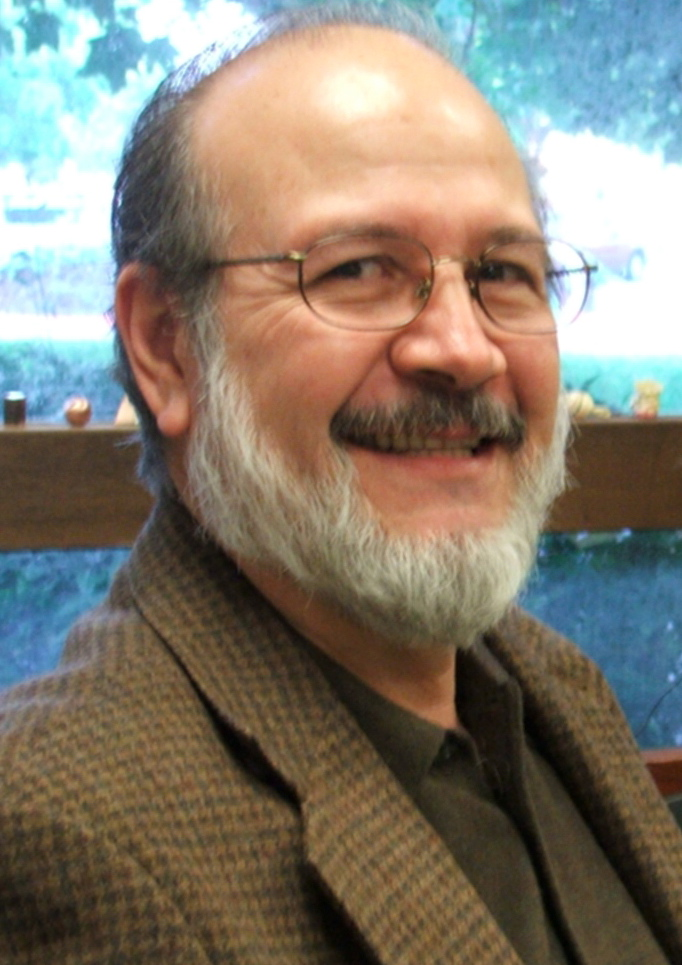
Francisco H. Vázquez director of the Hutchins Institute for Public Policy Studies and Community Action.

There are two ideological approaches to the institutionalization of Chicano studies as a formal discipline. The first approach is Pragmatism, an approach which emphasizes social responsibility and is supported by prominent scholar, Rodolfo Acuña. The second approach is Perspectivism, an approach which emphasizes introspection and is supported by prominent scholar, Michael Soldatenko.

However, the Chicano studies discipline is not limited to these perspectives. Scholar Raoul Contreras, for example, considers Chicano internal colonialism and Chicano self-determination to be important issues that are explored within Chicano studies.

=== Pragmatism ===
Pragmatism is an ideological approach to Chicano studies. This ideology emphasizes political activism and social responsibility. Adherents to this approach believe it is the community's job to insert themselves into the workings of the current educational system to demand formal recognition of Chicano studies as a discipline. Additionally, it is vital that resources such as staff and offices are acquired in order to institutionalize the discipline. Rafael Pérez-Torres, author of "Chicana/o Studies's Two Paths", highlights that this approach has faced criticism due to its tendency to allow for the over politicization of Chicano issues. He identifies the argument that it creates a forum focused on "separatist politics" and neglects the furtherance of the institutionalization of the field of study. In other words, the ideology fails to fulfill the aim of integrating Chicano studies into the US educational system and, instead, places exclusive focus on the political issues surrounding ethnicity. However, Sarita E. Brown et al. argue that political mobilization is key to the Pragmatic approach. They contend that Chicano political advocacy should emphasize the lobbying of government officials for pro-Chicano studies policies.

Rodolfo Acuña, former chair at the Department of Chicano Studies at California State University, Northridge, and prominent scholar in the field, fervently emphasizes the importance of sacrifice and struggle in order to institutionalize and gain formal respect for the field of Chicano studies. Acuña frames the quest for institutionalization as a gritty battle to be waged by students and faculty.

=== Perspectivism ===
Perspectivism is another ideological approach to Chicano studies. This ideology emphasizes intellectualism, introspection, and academic expertise. This ideology neglects the needs for social change and, instead, exclusively focuses on engagement with relevant scholarship. Perspectivists believe individual ambition, pursuit of respect, and the studying of relevant Chicano issues will lead to the institutionalization of Chicano studies. Additionally, the creation of intellectual communities, research centers, and other forums for academe further validate the field of Chicano studies. This validation continues to help facilitate the institutionalization of the discipline.

In addition, Michael Soldatenko, the former chair of the Department of Chicano Studies at California State University, Los Angeles, and a prominent scholar in the field of Chicano studies, has discovered a new popularity surrounding the perspectivist approach. The ideological approach to Chicano studies has shifted from pragmatic to perspectivist since the 1970s. Thus, according to Soldatenko, the approach's widespread popularity signals its significance to the furtherance of the field of Chicano studies.

== Responses to Chicano studies ==
Responses to Chicano studies and its impact on the greater American educational system can be separated into two categories, positive and negative. Those who see the programs and studies as positive believe that Chicano studies create positive academic changes in Chicano students. For example, Chicano educator Curtis Acosta noted the shift in Chicano students' minds after they were exposed to literature that was written by Chicanos and intended for Chicanos. For according to Acosta, Chicanos often felt excluded by traditional educational systems, and felt as if they are not meant for educational success, or that success is tied to "whiteness," an educational standard that they can not attain. Acosta noted that the students that were exposed to Chicano literature felt empowered and believed that educational success and higher education was meant for them. Therefore, those who view the studies as positive believe Chicano education assists in Chicano students' academic growth and in their realization that education is not inextricably linked to being white.

== Legal restrictions ==
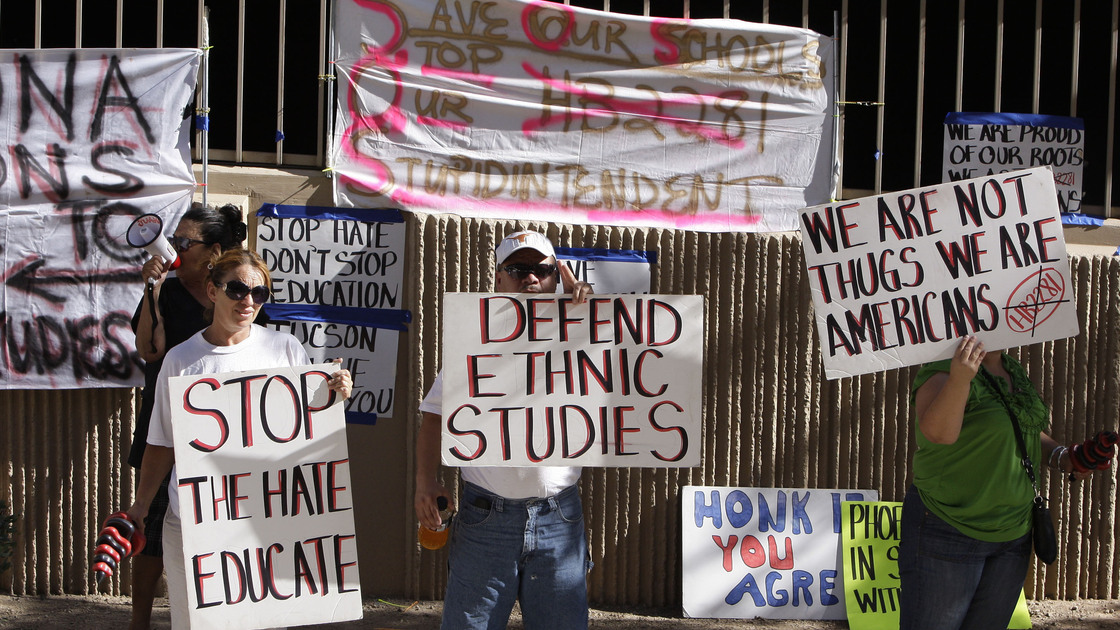
Protesters are seen in June 2011 in support of the Tucson Unified School District's Mexican-American studies program. A new state law effectively ended the program saying it was divisive.

On May 11, 2010, the Governor of Arizona, Jan Brewer, signed House Bill 2281, or HB 2281. This bill prohibits course curricula within a school district or charter school from advocating ethnic solidarity or promoting insurgency, racism, or classism. Additionally, the course curriculum may not be designed exclusively for one ethnicity. However, Native American classes still comply with federal law. In addition, the grouping of classes based on academic performance is still permissible. Course curriculum concerning the history of a specific ethnic group or about controversial history which is available to all students is acceptable, as well. Another provision of the law stated that any school district or charter school breaching its stated provisions would be liable to lose state funding as a public institution.

Subsequently, the Mexican-American studies program taught in the Tucson Unified School District (TUSD) was found to be in violation of House Bill 2281 by the former Arizona Superintendent, Tom Horne. On the contrary, an independent audit, paid for by the state of Arizona, found the program was not in violation of HB 2281. However, after TUSD issued an appeal stating the program was in violation, Superintendent John Huppenthal decided that the course must be disbanded instead of relinquishing state funding. Thus, in January 2012, the TUSD school board came to a 4-1 decision that the program was to be disbanded as to not lose state funding for the district. Furthermore, HB 2281 facilitated more challenges and limitations on classes teaching Chicana/o studies not just in Arizona, but across the United States.

== Scholars ==
- Curtis Acosta (Professor of Education)
- Rodolfo Acuña
- Gloria Anzaldúa
- Cecilia Preciado de Burciaga
- José Cuéllar
- Carl Gutiérrez-Jones
- Luis Leal
- Amalia Mesa-Bains
- Isidro Ortiz
- Jacinto Quirarte
- María Guillermina Valdes Villalva
- Refugio Rochin (Founder Smithsonian Latino Center)
- Felipe de Ortego y Gasca (Founding Director Chicana/o Studies, University of Texas—El Paso, 1970)

== Programs and departments ==
This is an abbreviated list of programs throughout the United States which can be associated with Chicana/o Studies.

- Chicanx Latinx Studies Program, University of California, Berkeley
- Department of Chicana/o and Latina/o Studies, California State University, Los Angeles
- Department of Chicana and Chicano Studies, California State University, Northridge
- Chicanx/Latinx Studies, Portland State University, OR
- César E. Chávez Department of Chicana/o and Central American Studies, University of California, Los Angeles
- Department of Chicano/Latino Studies, University of California, Irvine
- Department of Chicana and Chicano Studies, University of California, Santa Barbara
- Center for Mexican American Studies (CMAS), The University of Texas at Arlington
- Department of Mexican American Studies, University of Arizona
- Chicano Studies, California State University, Bakersfield
- Transborder Chicano/a Latino/a Studies, Arizona State University
- Department of Chicana and Chicano Studies, California State University, Dominguez Hills
- Chicana and Chicano Studies Program, California State University, Fullerton
- Intecollegiate Chicana/o Latina/o Studies Department at the Claremont Colleges, Claremont Colleges (Claremont McKenna College)
- Department of Chicana/o and Latina/o Studies, Loyola Marymount University
- Department of Chicana/o Studies, Metropolitan State College of Denver
- Chicana/o and Latinx Studies, University of Northern Colorado
- Department of Chicana & Chicano Studies, San Diego State University
- Chicanx/Latinx Studies, Scripps College
- Chicana/o-Latina/o Studies, Stanford University
- Chicana and Chicano Studies Program, University of California, Davis
- Chicano and Latino Studies, University of Minnesota
- Chicana and Chicano Studies, University of New Mexico
- Center for Mexican American Studies, University of Texas at Austin
- Mexican American Studies Program, University of Texas at San Antonio
- Chicano Studies, University of Texas at El Paso
- Chicano Studies, University of Washington
- Chican@ and Latin@ Studies, University of Wisconsin–Madison
- Latina/o Studies Program, University of Wyoming
- Chicano/Latino Studies, Michigan State University
- Department of Chicana/Chicano and Hemispheric Studies, Western New Mexico University

== See also ==
- Chicano art
- Chicano art movement
- Hijas de Cuauhtémoc
- Hijas de Cuauhtémoc
- UCLA Chicano Studies Research Center
- Gender studies
- Latino studies
- Mexican Studies (journal)
- Walkout
- Stand and Deliver
- Jotería studies
