= Francisco H. Vázquez =

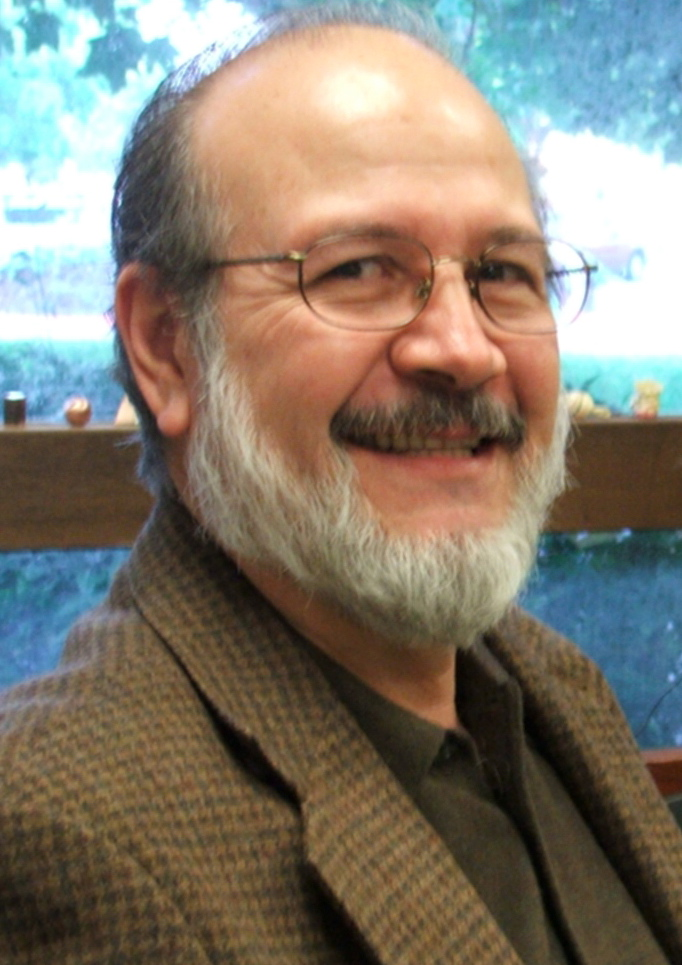
- Francisco H. Vázquez, May 2007
- Born: June 11, 1949 (age 77); Guadalajara, Jalisco, Mexico
- Occupations: Professor of History, Philosophy at Sonoma State University, Nonfiction writer
- Spouse: Rosa María
- Writing career
- Period: 1980-
- Subjects: Latino Thought; History; Politics; Culture; Intellectual History
- Website: sonoma.edu/hutchins/vazquez

Francisco H. Vázquez (born June 11, 1949, in Guadalajara, Jalisco, Mexico) is a Mexican-American scholar and public intellectual. Before retirement, Vázquez was a tenured professor of the history of ideas and director of the Hutchins Institute for Public Policy Studies and Community Action at the nationally known Hutchins School of Liberal Studies at Sonoma State University. He co-authored the prominent book Latino/a Thought: Culture, Politics, and Society, (Rowman & Littlefield) with University of California Irvine professor Rodolfo D. Torres in 2003. A second edition by Vázquez alone was issued in December 2008.

== Early years ==
Born in Guadalajara, Jalisco, Vázquez was educated in the United States. His mother was born in Colorado and his father in Jalisco, and he has traveled between the two countries and the two cultures since the age of five. After going through an ESL program in San Pedro, California, he attended Phineas Banning High School from which he graduated with honors. He then entered Claremont Men's College (now McKenna) where he received a B.A. in philosophy and continued his studies at the Claremont Graduate University where he was awarded a Doctorate in European Intellectual History.

== Early work ==
After teaching and doing administrative work at the Claremont Colleges, he accepted the position of Chair of the Chicano Studies Department at Loyola Marymount University in Los Angeles. Four years later he was offered a position at World College West (a private college in Petaluma, now closed) to direct the World Study and Mexico Program. This teaching position entailed living in Morelia, Michoacán, in the fall and winter, and in Petaluma in the spring, supervising a group of students doing language study and field research. During this time he established close relationships with the Purépecha people of Michoacán. 1

== Recent work ==
After six years of changing realities every six months, especially after the birth of his daughter Sofia Eréndira, he and his wife Rosa María decided to settle in Sonoma County. Starting at Sonoma State University in the fall of 1989, Vázquez has taught in the Departments of Mexican-American Studies, History, English and in the Hutchins School of Liberal Studies. He retired as a tenured Professor in the Hutchins School of Liberal Studies and faculty advisor of the Student Congress.

== Publications ==
In August 2002, along with his colleague Rodolfo D. Torres, Vázquez published the book Latino/a Thought: Culture, Politics, and Society. "Latino/a Thought brings together the most important writings that shape Latino consciousness, culture, and activism today"—from the back-cover of Latino/a Thought. A second edition by Vázquez alone was issued in December 2008.

Other publications of Vázquez include "Philosophy in Mexico: The Opium of the Intellectuals or a Prophetic Insight," Canadian Journal of Political and Social Theory, Vol. 4, No. 3 (1980) and "Chicanology: A Postmodern Analysis of Meshicano Discourse," Perspectives in Mexican American Studies, Vol. 3 (1992). 3
