= Mark Hugo Lopez =

American economist

- Born: April 16, 1967 (age 59)

Academic background
- Education: University of California, Berkeley; Princeton University
- Academic advisor: David Card

Mark Hugo Lopez (born April 16, 1967) is Director of Race and Ethnicity Research at the Pew Research Center. Lopez has authored and co-authored numerous reports on the attitudes and opinions of Hispanics, education, migration and immigration, identity, and civic engagement and voter participation. Lopez also coordinates the center's National Survey of Latinos.

Prior to joining the Pew, he was the research director of the Center for Information and Research on Civic Learning and Engagement (CIRCLE) as well as a research assistant professor at the School of Public Policy at the University of Maryland. Lopez is also a founding member and former president of the American Society of Hispanic Economists as well as a former member of the American Economic Association's Committee on the Status of Minority Groups in the Economics Profession.

== Biography ==
Lopez is from Los Angeles. He was born in a Mexican American family based in California for more than a century. He earned his bachelor's degree from the University of California, Berkeley, and his Ph.D. degree in economics in 1996 from Princeton University, where his thesis advisors included David Card.
