= Adela de la Torre =

American writer

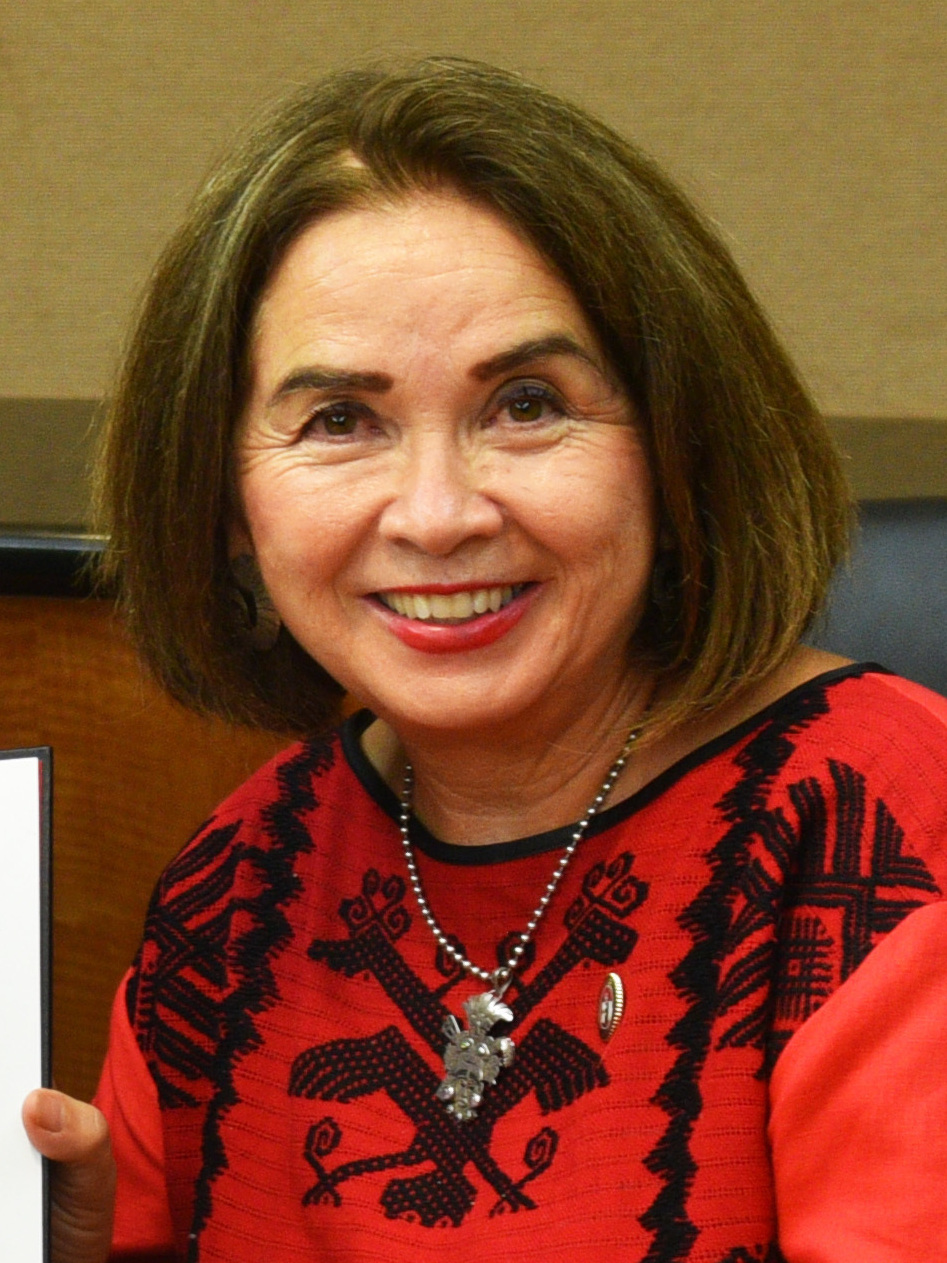

9th President of San Diego State University
- Incumbent
- Assumed office June 2018
- Preceded by: Elliot Hirshman

Personal details
- Born: San Francisco Bay Area
- Education: University of California, Berkeley (BA, MA, PhD)

Academic background
- Thesis: Campesinos and the state: Control of the California harvest labor market 1950-1970 (1982)
- Doctoral advisor: Gordon Rausser

Academic work
- Discipline: Economics
- Sub-discipline: Latino studies
- Institutions: California State University, Long Beach; University of Arizona; University of California, Davis; San Diego State University

Adela de la Torre is an American professor and university administrator who is the ninth and current president of San Diego State University (SDSU). De la Torre assumed office in 2018; she is the first woman to serve in the role.

== Early life and education ==
Adela de la Torre was born and raised in the San Francisco Bay Area. Her grandparents were immigrants from Mexico, and her mother was a public school teacher. De la Torre attended the University of California, Berkeley, where she received bachelor's and master's degrees in the political economy of natural resources, as well as a Ph.D. in agricultural and resource economics in 1982.

== Career ==
De la Torre was a professor at California State University, Long Beach, and at the University of Arizona, where she was director of the Mexican-American Studies Center and also served as director of the Hispanic Center of Excellence for the University of Arizona College of Medicine. She later worked at University of California, Davis, where she served as professor and chair of the Department of Chicana/o studies, director of the Center for Transnational Health, and vice chancellor for student affairs. De la Torre was named the president of San Diego State University on January 31, 2018, and assumed the presidency in June 2018.

She writes and speaks about the importance of helping students from underprivileged backgrounds with issues related to student debt. She is also a co-editor of Speaking from the Body: Latinas on Health and Culture, a collection of personal reflections on health care experiences from Latina patients or their family caregivers or friends, combined with professional analysis of the narratives with a discussion of Latina health issues and policy recommendations.

Her primary fields of research include childhood obesity, binational health, science and educational disparities, and interventions for Chicana/o Latina/o students. She is a founding member and former president of the American Society of Hispanic Economists. The society honored her with its biennial Academic Achievement Award in 2016.

== Selected publications ==
- de la Torre, Adela; Pesquera, Beatríz M., eds. (1993). Building with our hands: new directions in Chicana studies. Berkeley: University of California Press. ISBN 978-0-520-07089-9.
- de la Torre, Adela (2002). Moving from the margins: a Chicana voice on public policy. Tucson: University of Arizona Press. ISBN 978-0-8165-1991-0.
- de la Torre, Adela; Estrada, Antonio L. (2015). Mexican Americans and health: ¡sana! ¡sana!. Tucson: University of Arizona Press. ISBN 978-0-8165-3157-8.
