= Carl Gutierrez-Jones =

American professor of English and Chicano Studies

Carl Scott Gutiérrez-Jones (born 1960) is an American professor of English and Chicano Studies who served as Associate Vice Chancellor and Dean of Undergraduate Education at the University of California, Santa Barbara.

== Biography ==
Carl Gutiérrez-Jones was born in 1960 in Maryland to parents Joyce Lucile Coleman and José Gutiérrez, and grew up in Davis, California.

In 1982, Gutiérrez-Jones received his bachelor's degree majoring in English and American literature at Stanford University in Stanford, California. In 1990, he received his PhD in English and American Literature at Cornell University in Ithaca, New York, writing his dissertation on "Historical Designs: A Pan-American Approach to the Contemporary Encyclopedic Novel."

In July 1990, Gutiérrez-Jones was hired as English professor at the University of California, Santa Barbara (UCSB), in Santa Barbara, where he served for 28 years. In 1994, he was named the Harold J. Plous Award Lecturer. In 1997, he was a Fellow of the Dartmouth Summer Institute on American Studies. From 2000 to 2005, he was the Principal Investigator of a Rockefeller Foundation Postdoctoral Fellowship Award. From 2001 to 2004, he chaired the department of English. From 2005 to 2011, he was director of the Center for Chicano Studies (est. 1970). In 2007, he received the English Department's Graduate Student Mentorship Award.

In July 2014, Gutiérrez-Jones was appointed Acting Dean of Undergraduate Education for UCSB's College of Letters and Science by then-Chancellor Henry T. Yang. From 2015 to 2018, he was the Principal Investigator of a $2.6 million grant from the U.S. Department of Education supporting a new program to address challenges faced by low-income and underrepresented students, dubbed Opening New Doors to Accelerating Success (ONDAS). In July 2018, he retired to the position of Professor Emeritus.

At UCSB, he served on the Academic Senate’s Committee on Academic Personnel, Committee on Educational Policy and Academic Planning, Enrollment Committee, and the General Education Task Force. While teaching English at UCSB, he held affiliated appointments in the Comparative Literature Program, Latin American and Iberian Studies Program, Black Studies Department, and Chicano Studies Department. He is a member of the Modern Language Association, American Studies Association, Cinema and Media Studies Association, Science Fiction Research Association, Multi-Ethnic Studies in Europe and the Americas Association, and the International Society of the Study of Narrative. As well as publishing three books, he also published articles in academic journals International Journal of the Book, Concentric, Comparative Literature Studies, Journal of American Studies, Cultural Critique, Arizona Quarterly, American Quarterly, Dispositio, Diacritics, The Review of Contemporary Fiction, and The Américas Review.

Gutiérrez-Jones and his wife Leslie have two daughters.

== Works ==
- Rethinking the Borderlands: Between Chicano Narrative and Legal Discourse, University of California Press, 1995
- Critical Race Narratives: A Study of Race, Rhetoric, and Injury, New York University Press, 2001
- Suicide and Contemporary Science Fiction, Cambridge University Press, 2015
