= Rodolfo Acuña =

American historian and author (1932–2026)

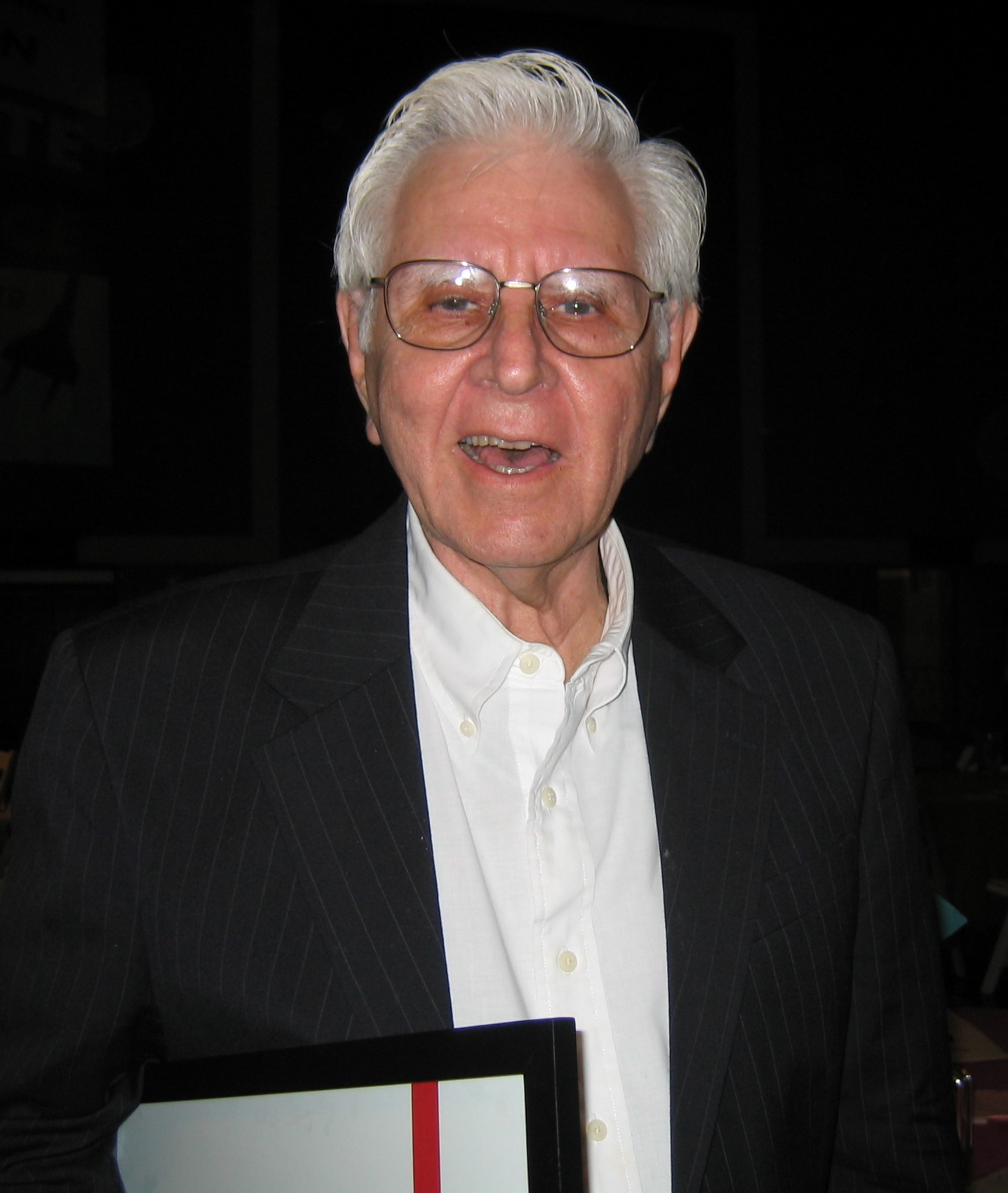
- Acuña in 2007
- Born: Rodolfo Francisco Acuña; May 18, 1932; Los Angeles, California, U.S.
- Died: March 23, 2026 (aged 93); Los Angeles, California, U.S.
- Other name: "Rudy"
- Occupations: Historian, educator, academic
- Known for: Occupied America and Chicana/o Studies

Rodolfo Francisco "Rudy" Acuña (May 18, 1932 – March 23, 2026) was an American historian and educator who was a professor at California State University, Northridge. He was also a scholar of Chicano studies and the author of the 1972 book Occupied America: A History of Chicanos, a foundational Mexican American history survey.

== Early life and education ==
Acuña was born in Los Angeles, California, on May 18, 1932, to parents from the Mexican states of Sonora and Jalisco.

He received his bachelor's and master's degrees from Los Angeles State College, now California State University, Los Angeles, and later earned his Ph.D. in history from the University of Southern California (USC).

== Career ==
In 1958, Acuña began teaching at San Fernando Junior High. He then transferred to Cleveland High School, where he taught social studies until 1965, when he received a tenured position at Los Angeles Pierce College. To support his doctoral studies at the University of Southern California, he also taught adult high school. During this time, he was active with the Latin American Civic Association and the Mexican American Political Association. In 1969, he became the founding chair of California State University, Northridge's Chicano/a Studies department, where he also began teaching.

In 1989, Acuña was a founding member of the Labor/Community Strategy Center, a civil rights advocacy group. Two years later, he traveled to El Salvador to cover its presidential elections as a correspondent for the Texas Observer, seeking to understand "how accurate were the interpretations of historians of the past".

== Lawsuit ==
In 1990, Acuña sought a senior professorship in the Chicano Studies Department at the University of California, Santa Barbara (UCSB). Although the department had invited him to apply and he was the sole recommended candidate, a faculty review committee rejected his application. In 1992, Acuña sued UCSB for discrimination. The race discrimination cause of action was dropped by the judge, and the political cause of action had previously been dropped because it missed the statute of limitations filing. A jury found that Acuña had been discriminated against based on his age, but Federal Judge Audrey Collins refused to compel the university to hire him. Instead, she awarded him a monetary compensation of $325,000, which Acuña stated he and his wife would use to assist victims of employment discrimination in higher education. The For Chicana Chicano Studies Foundation gives an average of $7,500 annually in scholarships.

== Personal life ==
Acuña was married twice. His first marriage was to Irmgard Kienast, who he met in Europe while serving in the U.S. Army in the early 1950s. This marriage ended in divorce. His second marriage was to Guadalupe Compean Acuña. He had three children, two from his first marriage, and the third from his second marriage.

== Death and legacy ==
Acuña died in Los Angeles on March 23, 2026, at the age of 93.

His archives are held in the Special Collections and Archives section of the Library at California State University, Northridge.

== Honors ==
- Outstanding Academic Title by CHOICE Magazine for Corridors of Migration: The Odyssey of Mexican Laborers, 1600–1933, 2009
- National Hispanic Institute, Lifetime Achievement Award, Austin, Texas, 2008
- Community Coalition South Central Los Angeles, 9th Annual Gala Dinner, Activist/Scholar Award, 2008
- The Labor/Community Strategy Center Award, May 2007
- Center for the Study of Political Graphics (CSPG), Historian of the Lions Award at 18th Anniversary Dinner in Los Angeles on Saturday, October 13, 2007
- National Hispanic Hero Award, March 11, 2006, Chicago, 24th Annual National Conference. United States Hispanic Leadership Institute
- LA Weekly LA People 2006, April 21–27, 2006, p. 108, Featured as one of 100 LA shakers and movers
- Symposium on the Works of Rodolfo F. Acuna, California State Northridge, May 2005
- Selected As One of the "100 Most Influential Educators of the 20th Century," Black Issues In Higher Education
- Recipient of the Gustavus Myers Award for an Outstanding Book on Race Relations in North America
- Distinguished Scholar Award, National Association of Chicana and Chicano Studies
- Homenaje University of Guadalajara Feria Internacional del Libro de Guadalupe in the City of Guadalajara, State of Jalisco, Republic of Mexico, for the Outstanding Scholar of U.S.-Mexico Studies
- Emil Freed Award for Community Service, Southern California Library for Social Studies and Research
- Founder's Award for Community Service, Liberty Hill Foundation
- American Council of Learned Societies Award
- Rockefeller Humanities Fellowship

== Publications ==
- 1969 The Story of the Mexican American. New York: American Book Co. 140 pp.
- 1970 A Mexican American Chronicle. New York: American Book Co. pp. 210.
- 1970 Cultures in Conflict: Case Studies of the Mexican American. Los Angeles: Charter Books. pp. 140.
- 1971 The story of the Mexican Americans; the men and the land. Sacramento: California State Dept. of Education.
- 1972 Occupied America: The Chicano Struggle Toward Liberation. New York: Harper & Ro., pp. 282.
- 1974 Sonoran Strongman: The Times of Ignacio Pesqueira. Tucson: University of Arizona Press. pp. 179. ISBN 0-8165-0370-2.
- 1976 America Ocupada. Ediciones ERA. pp. 342.
- 1980 Occupied America: A History of Chicanos. 2nd Edition. New York: Harper & Row. pp. 437.
- 1981 El Caudillo Sonorense: Ignacio Pesqueira y sus tiempos. Mexico D.F.: ERA. pp. 191.
- 1984 Community Under Siege: A Chronicle of Chicanos East of the Los Angeles River, 1945-1975. UCLA. pp. 560. ISBN 0-89551-066-9.
- 1988 Sound Recording: Occupied America a history of Chicanos. Publication: Salt Lake City, Utah : Utah State Library Division for the Blind and Physically Handicapped. Cassette tape.
- 1988 Occupied America: A History of Chicano. 3d Edition. New York: Harper and Row. pp. 475. Recipient of the Gustavus Myers Award for an Outstanding Book on Race Relations in North America.
- 1996 Anything But Mexican: Chicanos in Contemporary Los Angeles. London: Verso Press, 1996. 320. Recipient of the Gustavus Myers Award for an Outstanding Book on Race Relations in North America. ISBN 1-85984-936-9.
- 1997 Truth and Objectivity and Chicano history. East Lansing: Julian Samora Research Institute, Michigan State University. ISBN 0-8165-0370-2.
- 1998 Sometimes There is No Other Side: Essays on Truth and Objectivity. Notre Dame: University of Notre Dame Press. pp. 291. Honorable Mention for Gustavus Myers Award for an Outstanding Book on Race Relations in North America. ISBN 0-268-01763-8.
- 2000 Occupied America: A History of Chicanos. 4th edition. New York: Addison, Wesley & Longman.
- 2004 Occupied America: A History of Chicanos. 5th edition. New York: Longman. ISBN 0-321-10330-0.
- 2004 US Latinos Issues. Greenwood Press. ISBN 0-313-32211-2.
- 2007 Occupied America: A History of Chicanos. 6th edition. New York: Longman. ISBN 0-321-42738-6.
- 2007 Corridors of Migration: Odyssey of Mexican Laborers, 1600-1933. University of Arizona Press.
- 2008 Voices of the U.S. Latino Experience [Three Volumes]. Greenwood Press.
- 2017 Assault on Mexican American Collective Memory, 2010–2015: Swimming with Sharks. Lexington Books.
