= Refugio Rochin =

American agricultural economist

Refugio I. Rochin
- Born: May 31, 1941 (age 85); Colton, California

Academic background
- Education: University of California, Berkeley; University of Arizona; Michigan State University

Refugio I. Rochin (born May 31, 1941) is an American professor emeritus in agricultural and resource economics and Chicana/o studies at the University of California, Davis, director emeritus at the University of California, Santa Cruz, and instructor at Pennsylvania State University World Campus. He is an expert on rural Latinas/os and Latina/o Studies.

== Early life and education ==
Refugio I. Rochin was born in Colton, California, on May 31, 1941, and raised in Carlsbad, California. His father immigrated from Sinaloa, Mexico, and his parents, Juanita Rodriguez-Ramirez and Refugio Rochin-Diazsalcedo, owned wholesale food companies and restaurants in Coachella, California, and Carlsbad. Rochin attended the University of California, Berkeley, where he received a bachelor's degree in economics in 1966; the University of Arizona, where he received a Master of Science in agricultural economics and anthropology in 1967; and Michigan State University, where he received a master's degree in communication in 1968 and a Ph.D. in agricultural economics in 1971. He received an Honorary Doctor of Humane Letters from Northeastern University in 2000 for his work as founding director of the Smithsonian Center for Latino Initiatives. While an undergraduate, he spent two years in the Peace Corps, serving in Colombia. As a graduate student, Rochin worked for the Ford Foundation, where he was a member of the Green Revolution team of Nobel laureate Norman Borlaug, in Pakistan and Bangladesh.

== Career ==
Rochin is professor emeritus at the University of California, Davis, where he was professor of agricultural economics; principal investigator and economist, Giannini Foundation (U.C. Berkeley); professor, program director, and chair, Chicana/o Studies; associate dean for outreach, College of Agriculture and Natural Resources; and council member of the Academic Senate.

Throughout his career, Rochin has been an international agricultural economist with the United States Agency for International Development, the Ford Foundation, and other organizations.

As professor emeritus, Rochin's focus has been to build recognition of the participation and accomplishments of Chicanas/os in the development and the social institutions of the United States. From 1994 to 1998, Rochin was director of the Julian Samora Research Institute and professor of sociology and agricultural economics at Michigan State University, where he was principal investigator and administrator for the Midwest Consortium for Latino Research. In 1998 Rochin became founding director of the Smithsonian Center for Latino Initiatives, where he oversaw exhibitions, programs, collections, and studies.

In 2003–2005, Rochin was director for the Society for Advancement of Chicanos/Latinos and Native Americans in Science in Santa Cruz, California, which in 2004 received the Presidential Award for Excellence in Science, Mathematics, and Engineering Mentoring. He is a recipient of the Academic Achievement Award from the American Society of Hispanic Economists (ASHE). He has also served in many academic, executive, and state and national board positions.

== Selected publications ==
Rochin, Refugio I. September 1972. “A Socio-Economic Study of Dwarf Wheat Adoption by Barani Smallholders of Hazara District.” Journal of Rural Development and Administration, Pakistan Academy for Rural Development, IX(3):79-99.

Rochin, Refugio I. Feb. 1973. "A Micro-Economic Analysis of Smallholder Response to High-Yielding Varieties of Wheat in West Pakistan." Small Farm Credit: Innovations in Pakistan. U.S. Agency for International Development, Washington, DC: SR114, 165 pp.

Rochin, Refugio I. June 1977. "Labor-Intensive Development: Theory and Implications." Western Journal of Agricultural Economics, 1(1):119-121.

Rochin, Refugio I. June 1980. "Preassessing Social Returns to Farm Mechanization Research: A Suggested Method and Cases." New Labor Review, pp. 48–74. Giannini Foundation Paper No. 542.

Rochin, Refugio I. Spring 1986. "The Conversion of Chicano Farmworkers into Owner-Operators of Cooperative Farms: 1970-85." Rural Sociology, 51(1):97-115.

Rochin, Refugio I. and Adela de la Torre. May 1988. "Strengthening Chicano Studies Programs: Correlates for Success." Hispanic Journal of Education, pp. 11–30.

Rochin, Refugio I., Y. Kawamura, D.B. Gwynn, and E. Dolber-Smith. 1989. "California's Rural Poor: Correlations with Rurality, Economic Structure, and Social Dimensions." Chapter 5 in Rural Development Issues of the Nineties: Perspectives from the Social Sciences, edited by T.T. Williams, W.A. Hill, and R.D. Christy. Tuskegee, Alabama: Tuskegee University Press, pp. 63–88.

Gwynn, D.B., Y. Kawamura, E. Dolber-Smith, R.I. Rochin. March 1990. "California's Rural and Urban Poverty in the 1980s." Journal of Economic and Business Studies, 29(4):29-48.

Rochin, Refugio I., and Monica D. Castillo. 1993. "Immigration, Colonia Formation, and Latino Poor in Rural California: Evolving 'Immiseration.'" Research Report, Tomas Rivera Center, Claremont, California, 68 pp.

Hampton, Steve, Javier Ekboir, and Refugio I. Rochin. Nov. 1995. "The Performance of Latinos in Rural Public Schools: A Comparative Analysis of Test Scores in Grades 3, 6, and 12." Hispanic Journal of Behavioral Sciences, 17(4):480-498.

Rochin, R.I., and Elaine Allensworth. Nov/Dec 1997. "Latino Colonization in Rural California: The Emergence of Economic Patchwork. Frontera Norte." Publicacion Semestral de El Colegio de la Frontera Norte, Mexico. 9(18):145-158.

Lopez, Elias, Enrique Ramirez, and Refugio I. Rochin. June 1999. "Latinos and Economic Development in California." California Research Bureau, Monograph CRB-99-008, 54 pp.

Rochin, Refugio I., and Dennis N. Valdés, Eds. 2000. Voices of a New Chicana/o History. East Lansing, Michigan: Michigan State University Press.

Allensworth, Elaine, and Refugio Rochín. 2005. "Latino Colonization and White Emigration: Ethnic Transformation in Agricultural Communities of California." Journal of Latino/Latin American Studies: November 2005, Vol. 1, No. 4, pp. 25–66.

Rochin, Refugio I., and Stephen F. Mello. Oct. 2007. “Latinos in Science: Trends and Opportunities,” Journal of Hispanic Higher Education: Vol. 6 No. 4, pp. 305–355.

Rochin, Refugio. 2018. Book Review: Agriculture and the Rural Economy in Pakistan. 2016. Edited by David J. Spielman, Sohail J. Malik, Paul Dorosh, and Nuzhat Ahmad. In American Journal of Agricultural Economics: Volume 100, Issue 5, October 2018, pp. 1510–1511.
