= Marie T. Mora =

American economist (born 1969)

- Born: November 7, 1969 (age 56)

Academic background
- Education: University of New Mexico (B.A., M.A.); Texas A&M University (Ph.D.)

Academic work
- Discipline: Labor Economics
- Institutions: Metropolitan State University of Denver; University of Texas Rio Grande Valley; NMSU

Marie T. Mora (born November 7, 1969) is an American economist who currently acts as Provost Ad Interim at Metropolitan State University of Denver. She was also a former tenured faculty member at New Mexico State University.

Mora's research focus is on labor economics, and on account of her research expertise on Hispanic socioeconomic outcomes across the U.S., she has been invited to share her research with the White House Initiative for the Educational Excellence of Hispanics; the Board of Governors of the Federal Reserve system; The U.S. Department of Labor; The White House Council of Economic Advisors; the Federal Reserve Bank of Dallas, and others.

Mora is also currently the Director of the American Economic Association's National Science Foundation (NSF) funded Economics Mentoring Program, and a leader in the NSF-funded ADVANCE Program at UTRGV. Mora has also been a Research Fellow at the IZA Institute of Labor Economics since 2014 and serves on the Data Users Advisory Committee for the US Bureau of Labor Statistics and the editorial board of Social Science Quarterly, amongst others.

Mora was formerly a mentor in the Diversity Initiative for Tenure in Economics program, a board member and chair of the AEA's Committee on the Status of Minority Groups in the Economics Profession, as well as having served two terms as President of the American Society of Hispanic Economists.

== Education ==
Mora earned her B.A in economics at the University of New Mexico in December 1990, and her M.A in economics at the same university in July 1992. Mora earned her Ph.D. in economics at Texas A&M University in August 1996.

== Career ==
=== Academic career ===
Mora obtained the position of assistant professor of economics at New Mexico State University in 1995, and went on to become an associate professor in 2000.

In 2002, Mora joined The University of Texas Pan American as an associate professor of economics, and became a professor of economics at the same institution in 2006.

Mora also obtained the position of professor of economics at The University of Texas Rio Grande Valley in 2015.

Mora was a professor of economics at the University of Missouri – St. Louis from 2019 to 2022.

She is currently the Provost Ad Interim at Metropolitan State University of Denver, and was previously the deputy provost from 2022 to 2023.

=== Public Sector ===
From January 2018 to June 2019, Mora was appointed to the Federal Reserve Bank of Dallas San Antonio Branch board of directors, where she provided input on regional economic conditions as part of the Federal Reserve's monetary policy functions. Mora has also participated or moderated several conference discussions with Federal Reserve officials, including the Inaugural National Urban League Delegation Meeting with Fed Chair Janet Yellen in 2016.

Mora served two terms on the U.S. Bureau of Labor Statistics’ Data Users Advisory Committee from 2012 to 2018.

== Scholarship ==
=== "Hispanic Entrepreneurs in the 2000s: An Economic Profile and Policy Implications" (2013) ===
In this book Mora along with Alberto Davila conduct an in depth economic and policy analysis of Hispanic Entrepreneurs during the early 2000s, exploring issues related to socio-demographic characteristics, business cycles, employment/sales, use of digital technology and public policies affecting Hispanic business owners during this time. The book also exhibits comprehensive empirical analysis of issues affecting Hispanic populations including gender differences and inequality; Difference across Hispanic groups; and differences between natives and immigrant Hispanic populations. Mora and Davila explain that the early 2000s saw a dramatic increase in the Hispanic population and if these changes continued Hispanic entrepreneurship will likely become a large component of American job creation in the near future. The book was awarded the Winner of the 2014 Outstanding Academic Title Award sponsored by Choice.

=== "Population, Migration and Socioeconomic Outcomes among Island and Mainland Puerto Ricans" (2018) ===
In this book Mora with Alberto Davila and Havidan Rodriguez analyze large datasets such as the Puerto Rican community survey and the American community survey to create the first comprehensive analysis of socioeconomic and demographic effects of "La Crisis Boricua" in which include shrinking and rapidly aging populations, declines of high-tech industries, massive net out migration from the Islands, losses in both public and private sector careers, growing public debt, pension obligations and defaults on bondholder dividends. This crisis began with the 1917 Jones-Shafroth Act which granted Puerto Ricans U.S. citizenship that caused the influx of Islanders coming to the mainland. Mora explains differences in comparative earnings and the likelihood of being impoverished was lower in the Mainland.

=== "Gender and Business Outcomes of Black and Hispanic New Entrepreneurs in the United States" (2014) ===
This journal by Mora and Davila investigate the reasons why high failure rates are associated with women of color in entrepreneurship. In 2007 alone nearly half of businesses started by Black or Hispanic women closed down within the year. Mora and Davila found that even when controlling for firm level/partner characteristics unemployment rates in colored populations, businesses operated by women of color had a significantly higher likelihood of failure. This happens despite the existence of public support programs that encourage women of color to pursue entrepreneurial opportunities. Mora acknowledges that there have been several unsuccessful legislative attempts to change current programs such as the Women's business programs act of 2007 or the Small Business Administration. The paper finds that local economic conditions still play the major role in firm failure rates, for example states with high employment rates saw more firms fail within short periods of time, again emphasizing the importance of local economic conditions on the survivability of new businesses.

=== "Cross-Border Earnings of U.S Natives Along the U.S-Mexico Border" (2011) ===
This Journal article again is co-written with Alberto Davila, Mora and Davila investigate whether wages of U.S. Born cross-border workers differentiate from those that stayed to work in the U.S. Mora also specifically analyses the 1990s, a decade where U.S. Mexico trade boomed along with the expansion of the maquiladora industry. Mora and Davilla utilize U.S. Census data from 1990 and 2000 to estimate earning functions and changes to U.S. born Hispanic and non-Hispanic cross-border workers. They found that between the 1990s and 2000s U.S. native cross-border workers increased significantly, however these premiums were only developed for non-Hispanics. This lead Mora and Davila to conclude that some U.S. natives are able to find more lucrative career opportunities on the Mexican side of the border, this may be diminished by the increased restrictions for U.S-born residents to easily move between borders.

=== "Self-Employed Mexican Immigrants Residing along the U.S -Mexico Border: The earnings Effect of working in the U.S. versus Mexico" (2006) ===
In this Journal article Mora analyzes the U.S. census data from 2000 to explore the earnings of Mexican immigrants in US-Mexico border cities and if they differentiate based on work location. Mora's results show that Mexican entrepreneurs that live in U.S.-Mexico border cities who primarily work in Mexico earn a premium over their counterparts that are employed in the U.S. This earnings gap is even more prominent when focusing on Mexican entrepreneurs that lack U.S. citizenship. This leads Mora to conclude that policies that aim to reduce labor flows and economic trade across the U.S.-Mexico border may cause entrepreneurial activities of foreign-born U.S. residents to decrease in intensity.

=== "The Increasing Importance of Hispanics to the U.S. workforce" (2015) ===
To commemorate the 100th anniversary of the Bureau of Labor Statistics' Monthly Labor Review Mora writes this article to analyze the changes to the U.S. labor force. Mora notes that the growth of women in the workforce as well as the number of Hispanics in the U.S. has grown significantly. Mora notes that the growth for Hispanic women in the workforce grew almost 157 percent compared to 124 percent for their male counterparts. Mora follows this with the notion that access to quality education is vital when trying to decrease inequality, Hispanics on average receive less-education than non-Hispanics and this disparity has stayed rather constant despite increased Hispanic participation in higher education. Mora argues that this under-education of Hispanics causes numerous economic, social and labor market repercussions such as low-wages, high unemployment and increased poverty rates. Therefore, with a growing Hispanic population in mind, these educational outcomes will have further consequences than just to the Hispanic community and will have a significant effect on the structure of the U.S. workforce.
