= American Society of Hispanic Economists =

- Formation: 2002; 24 years ago United States
- Members: Open membership
- Website: www.asheweb.net

The American Society of Hispanic Economists (ASHE) is a professional association of economists in the United States that promotes the representation of Hispanic Americans within the economics profession and supports economic research relevant to Hispanic Americans. ASHE is recognized by the American Economic Association as one of the academic organizations comprising the Allied Social Sciences Associations.

== Major activities ==
ASHE organizes sessions at academic conferences, including the annual meetings of the Allied Social Science Associations, the Southern Economic Association, and the Western Economic Association International. ASHE has also co-sponsored and co-organized a series of national conferences, including the 2010 and 2014 Hispanic Economic Issues conferences with the Americas Center of the Federal Reserve Bank of Atlanta, the 2011 Hispanic Economic Experience conference with the Federal Reserve Bank of Dallas, and the annual Freedom and Justice conferences with the National Economic Association, starting in 2014. Moreover, ASHE co-hosted the annual Economic Issues Affecting Hispanic and African American Communities conferences with the Department of Economics at Texas A&M University between 2007 and 2019.

During her presidency, Marie T. Mora founded the ASHE awards, including the biennial Academic Achievement Award (inaugurated in 2008) to recognize the impact of members on research/scholarship, and the biennial Outstanding Service Awards (inaugurated in 2009) to recognize the impact of the non-board members on ASHE by individuals as well as institutions and organizations. The ASHE Academic Achievement Awards are presented in even-numbered years at the annual business meeting (held at the ASSA annual meetings); the Outstanding Service Awards are presented in odd-numbered years. Mora also founded the ASHE Dissertation Fellowships (inaugurated in 2008) for Ph.D. students.

In conjunction with the American Economic Association's Committee on the Status of Minority Groups in the Economics Profession and the National Economic Association, ASHE publishes an annual newsletter called The Minority Report.

Starting in 2009, ASHE's Hispanic Economic Outlook Committee (which was co-founded by Marie T. Mora, Mark Hugo Lopez, and Alberto Davila in 2008) began disseminating the Hispanic Economic Outlook reports. These reports are available at the ASHE website, and selected issues can be accessed at the Social Science Research Network website.

== ASHE Presidents ==
- Jose Fernandez, University of Louisville, January 2021 - present
- Mónica García-Pérez, St. Cloud State University, January 2020 - December 2020
- Fernando Lozano, Pomona College, January 2019 - December 2019
- Susan Pozo, Western Michigan University, January 2018 - December 2018
- Luisa Blanco, Pepperdine University, January 2017 - December 2017
- Joseph Guzman, Michigan State University, January 2016 - December 2016
- Alberto Davila, The University of Texas Rio Grande Valley / The University of Texas - Pan American (now at Southeast Missouri State University), January 2015 - December 2015
- Catalina Amuedo-Dorantes, San Diego State University, January 2014 - December 2014
- David J. Molina, University of North Texas, October 2010 - December 2013
- Marie T. Mora, The University of Texas - Pan American (now The University of Texas Rio Grande Valley), October 2006 - September 2010
- Sue Stockly, Eastern New Mexico University, October 2004 - September 2006
- Mark Hugo Lopez, University of Maryland (now at the Pew Research Center), October 2003 - September 2004
- Adela de la Torre, University of California Davis (now at San Diego State University), October 2002 - September 2003

== ASHE Academic Achievement Awards ==
- 2020 - Catalina Amuedo-Dorantes, San Diego State University
- 2018 - Mark Hugo Lopez, Pew Research Center
- 2016 - Adela de la Torre, University of California Davis
- 2014 - Alberto Davila, The University of Texas - Pan American
- 2012 - Stephen Trejo, The University of Texas at Austin
- 2010 - Francisco Rivera-Batiz, Columbia University
- 2008 - Ronald Oaxaca, University of Arizona; and Refugio Rochin, University of California Davis

== ASHE Outstanding Service Awards - Individuals ==
- 2021 - Alberto Davila, Southeast Missouri State University
- 2019 - Marie T. Mora, University of Texas Rio Grande Valley
- 2017 - Sue Stockly, Eastern New Mexico University
- 2015 - Belinda Roman, Palo Alto College
- 2013 - Luisa Blanco, Pepperdine University
- 2011 - Isabel Ruiz, Sam Houston State University
- 2009 - Benjamin Widner, New Mexico State University; and Jose Pagan, Department of Economics & Finance, The University of Texas - Pan American

== ASHE Outstanding Service Awards - Institutions & Organizations ==
- 2021 - Diversity Initiative for Tenure in Economics
- 2019 - Michigan State University, and Western Michigan University
- 2017 - National Economic Association
- 2015 - Robert Wood Johnson Foundation Center for Health Policy, University of New Mexico
- 2013 - Western Economic Association International, and Community Development Office of the Federal Reserve Bank of Dallas
- 2011 - Federal Reserve Bank of Atlanta, and Department of Economics at Texas A&M University
- 2009 - Southern Economic Association, and Department of Economics at Texas A&M University

== ASHE Dissertation Awards ==
- 2020 - Jetson Leder-Luis, Massachusetts Institute of Technology
- 2019 - Maria Camila Morales, Georgia State University

== Founding members ==
ASHE was founded in January 2002 during the 2002 AEA/ASSA annual meeting in Atlanta, GA, over a dinner meeting of Hispanic and Latino/a economists organized by Joseph Guzman and Sue Stockly, sponsored by the RAND Corporation. The founding members included the following.

- Alberto Davila, University of Texas - Pan American
- Adela de la Torre, University of California Davis
- Joseph Guzman, RAND Corporation
- Mark Hugo Lopez, University of Maryland
- David Molina, University of North Texas
- Marie T. Mora, New Mexico State University
- Jose Pagan, University of Texas - Pan American
- Refugio Rochin, University of California Davis
- Richard Santos, University of New Mexico
- Sue Stockly, Eastern New Mexico University
- Stephen Trejo, University of Texas at Austin
- Arturo Gonzalez, University of Arizona
- Alfonso Flores-Lagunes, University of Arizona
