= International Migration (journal) =

- Discipline: Demography
- Language: English

Publication details
- Former name: Migration
- History: 1961-Present
- Publisher: Wiley-Blackwell on behalf of the International Organization for Migration.
- Frequency: Quarterly
- Impact factor: 0.773 (2011)

Standard abbreviations
- ISO 4: Int. Migr.

Indexing
- ISSN: 0020-7985 (print); 1468-2435 (web)

Links
- Journal homepage; Online access; Virtual issues

International Migration is a quarterly peer-reviewed academic journal published by Wiley-Blackwell on behalf of the International Organization for Migration (IOM).

== Overview ==
The journal was established in 1961 under the name Migration; the name was changed in 1963 to International Migration.

The journal publishes articles written by demographers, economists, political scientists, sociologists and other social scientists. International Migration publishes on topics relating to migration such as asylum, development, emigration, human rights, labor, remittance and refugees.

== Ranking ==
According to the Journal Citation Reports, the journal has a 2011 impact factor of 0.773, ranking it 16th out of 23 journals in the category "Demography".
