= Jacinto Quirarte =

American art historian, professor, writer

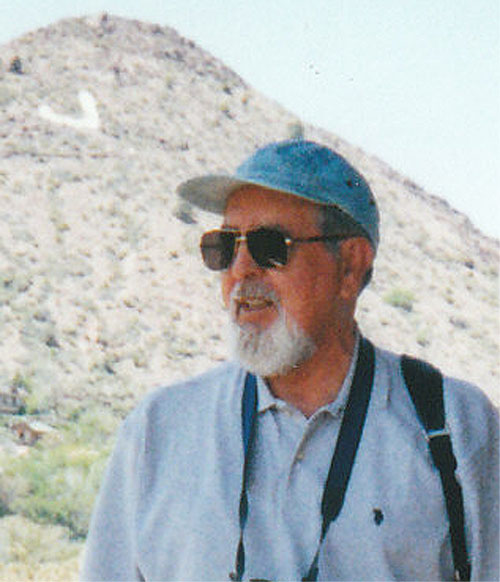
- Jacinto Quirarte in Jerome, Arizona, 2001
- Born: 17 August 1931; Jerome, Arizona, U.S.
- Died: July 20, 2012 (aged 80); Helotes, Texas, U.S.
- Education: San Francisco State College, National University of Mexico
- Occupations: Art historian, professor, writer
- Employer: University of Texas at San Antonio
- Known for: Historical scholarship in pre-Columbian, Latino and Chicano art
- Notable work: Mexican American Artists
- Spouse: Sara (57 years)

Jacinto Quirarte (August 17, 1931 – July 20, 2012) was an art historian, professor, scholar and writer who was instrumental in documenting and promoting Latino and Chicano art in the United States. He was an expert in pre-Columbian and Latin American art history. He was one of the first to insist that pre-Columbian art and Latino art become part of the mainstream American art history narrative. He wrote many papers, monographs and several books on the subject of both ancient and modern art in the United States, Mexico, Central and South America. He was one of the founding deans of the University of Texas at San Antonio (UTSA). Quirarte was also one of the first Mexican-American scholars to work at the university level.

== Biography ==
Quirarte was born during the Great Depression, in Jerome, a small mining town in Arizona. His father, Francisco, was originally from a town outside of Guadalajara, Jalisco. His mother, Frutosa, was born in Jerome, and her family had come from the same area of Jalisco. Quirarte's family lived in the part of town in Jerome known as El Barrio Mexicano or sometimes El Barrio Chicano. He did not learn to speak English until he started school. He enjoyed his studies from an early age, and began drawing Arizona landscapes as a young child.

Quirarte moved with his family to San Francisco at age 16. They eventually settled into the Mission District, where he attended Mission High School. In high school, he took many challenging courses, especially in critical writing in English. He also played varsity basketball for Mission High School. Although Quirarte excelled at sports, he felt that art was the direction he wanted to go in for a career.

Quirarte attended San Francisco State University (SFSU), where he got his BA. During his time there, he studied with artist John Gutmann, learning art history, photography and life drawing.

Between working towards his bachelor's and master's degree, which he also received from SFSU, Quirarte served in the Korean War in the United States Air Force, where he was a first lieutenant and a navigator. He was part of a bomber squadron from 1954 to 1957.

In 1954, Quirarte met his wife, Sara Bel Farmer, when he was at navigator training in Harlingen, Texas. They married within two months of meeting. Sara had worked as a model in New York and was a student at the University of Texas. They honeymooned in Mexico after their marriage in December.

Quirarte went back to SFSU and pursued a master's after leaving the Air Force. He took art history classes and aesthetics. One main reason that Quirarte chose not to become an artist was because he did not like the dominant art form of the time, Abstract Expressionism. He felt that he would have to work in that school of art to be successful, and he preferred figurative art. His master's thesis was on Mayan painting. Gutmann was a big help to Quirarte as he worked towards his thesis.

After working on his thesis, Quirarte used the G.I. Bill to pursue a Ph.D. in art history. He and his wife went to Mexico, where he attended the National Autonomous University of Mexico. He became "steeped in the artistic traditions of Central and South America" during his time there. Quirarte became an assistant to Alberto Ruz Lhuillier, a famous archaeologist who studied the Ancient Maya. He also studied under Justino Fernández, an important art historian, during his time in Mexico.

== Academic career and authorship ==
Quirarte taught at many places before settling into his career at the University of Texas at San Antonio. He taught at the University of Texas at Austin, Colegio Americano in Mexico City, University of the Americas in Mexico City and Yale University. He was a visiting professor at the University of California at Santa Barbara, University of New Mexico at Albuquerque and the American University of London.

Quirarte worked for two years as a cultural affairs representative for the United States embassy in Caracas, Venezuela. During this time, he was part of a cultural exchange program which helped bring pop art to South America.

In the early 1970s, Quirarte, along with his wife, Sara, interviewed Mexican artists from around the United States, driving cross-country from San Antonio to New York and then back west to California. He interviewed as many Chicano or Mexican-American artists as he could find through networking, in order to give a scholarly approach to Chicano art. Much of Quirarte's interest in Chicano art was because of its use of pre-Columbian iconography. The interviews he took during this trip were mostly done in 1970, and became the basis of his important book, Mexican American Artists. This book was important to many Chicanos and especially Chicano artists because it "gave a reality--a documented reality--to the idea--or concept--of Chicano art."

Quirarte started working for the University of Texas at San Antonio in 1972, when he was recruited by educator Tomás Rivera. He was one of the founding deans of UTSA, and was in charge of what was then called the College of Arts. He laid much of the groundwork for modern programs at UTSA. He retired from UTSA in 1999, but continued teaching until 2008.

Because Quirarte was an expert on pre-Columbian and Latino art, he served on many committees. President Gerald Ford chose him as one of twenty-five people appointed to the American Revolution Bicentennial Advisory Council. Quirarte served as the chair for the National Task Force on Hispanic Art for the National Endowment for the Arts (NEA) from 1982 to 1987. He was a founding member and first president of the Association of Latin American Art.

Quirarte died in Helotes, Texas, on July 20, 2012.

== Selected bibliography ==
- Izapan Style Art - A Study of Its Form and Meaning. Washington, DC: Dunbarton Oaks. 1973.
- Mexican American Artists. Austin, Texas: University of Texas Press. 1973. ISBN 978-0292750487.
- The Art and Architecture of Ancient Guatemala: A Selection of Masterpieces. 2001.
- How to Look at a Masterpiece: Europe and the Americas (6th ed.). McGraw Hill Custom Printing. 2003. ISBN 978-0072920895.
- The Art and Architecture of Texas Missions. Austin, Texas: University of Texas Press. 2002. ISBN 9780292769021.

== Quotes ==
"This is a roundabout way of saying how important I think education is for Hispanics and everyone else. It provides the necessary insights--analytical tools--which enable all of us to grow personally as well as professionally. In addition, in my work as a scholar, I find that I would simply be unable to survive without library resources. Such materials are crucial to my work."
