= Hijas de Cuauhtemoc =

Hijas de Cuauhtemoc was a revolutionary feminist organization founded in Mexico City during the Mexican Revolution (1910–1920). The organization was opposed to the dictatorship of Porfirio Díaz and the imperialist economic policies during this period, which they felt exploited workers. Hijas de Cuauhtemoc engaged in many forms of activism to promote the removal of Diaz from power. As a feminist organization, Hijas de Cuauhtemoc also sought to connect revolutionary struggle to radical social changes for Mexican women. Specifically, the feminist demands of Hijas de Cuauhtemoc were the abolition of domestic labor, equal pay, educational access, equal rights within the family, and rights for women in agricultural work.

== Origins ==
The revolutionary ideologies dedicated to the overthrow of Porfirio Díaz were often detailed in newspapers written by revolutionary journalists who sometimes wrote under pseudonyms. Many of these journalists were women who incorporated feminist ideals into their revolutionary rhetoric. Included in these feminist revolutionary journalists were Juana Gutierrez, Dolores Jiménez y Muro, Elisa Acufia y Rosette, and Ines Malvaez.

Juana Gutierrez, Dolores Jiménez y Muro, Elisa Acufia y Rosette, and Ines Malvaez were eventually jailed by the Porfiriato for their revolutionary writings and activism. It was during their time in jail that these feminists joined together united by their similar beliefs and passion for activism and founded Hijas de Cuauhtemoc.

== Activism ==
The activism of Hijas de Cuauhtemoc took many forms.

The organization was known for collecting 1,000 signatures that called for Porfirio Díaz to step down and for the Mexican government to hold a truly free election.

They are also known to have been a part of a peaceful demonstration during which protesters placed flowers on the graves of those who had died during the often-violent revolutionary struggle for independence. Many of these peaceful protesters were arrested.
