= National Association of Chicana and Chicano Studies =

American organization

National Association for Chicana and Chicano Studies
- Formation: 1972
- Founded at: San Antonio, Texas
- Type: Academic Organization
- Services: Serves "academic programs, departments and research centers that focus on issues pertaining to Mexican Americans, Chicana/os, and Latina/os."

The National Association for Chicana and Chicano Studies (NACCS) is "the academic organization that serves academic programs, departments and research centers that focus on issues pertaining to Mexican Americans, Chicana/os, and Latina/os." Unlike many professional academic associations, NACCS "rejects mainstream research, which promotes an integrationist perspective that emphasizes consensus, assimilation, and legitimization of societal institutions. NACCS promotes research that directly confronts structures of inequality based on class, race and gender privileges in U.S. society." The association is based in San Jose, California.

== History ==
NACCS was formed in 1972 in San Antonio, Texas, when attendees of the yearly meeting of the Southwestern Social Science Association discussed "the need for a national association of Chicana/o scholar activists." Discussants proposed the foundation of a National Caucus of Chicano Social Scientists (NCCSS). The NCCSS held its first meeting in New Mexico, chaired by Jaime Sena-Rivera, in May 1973 to discuss the organization's structure, ideology, and to set up a coordinating committee. Approximately fifty Chicano scholars were at this first meeting. At another meeting at the University of California, Irvine in November of the same year, the organization was officially named the National Association of Chicano Social Scientists (NACSS).

NACSS became a place for Chicana/o scholars to share their work, research and help establish Chicana/o studies in higher education. By 1975, it was still the only "national gathering of faculty, students and researchers specifically focusing on Chicano Studies and research."

In 1976, members voted to rename the organization National Association for Chicano Studies (NACS). By 1977, the NACS was considered a very successful organization that was able to manage the growth of Chicana/o studies.

In 1995, the organization was again renamed. Members chose the name National Association for Chicana and Chicano Studies "in recognition of the critical contribution and role of Chicanas in the association."

== Structure ==
The association is led by a coordinating committee made up of representatives from nine regional "focos" and the chairs of 8 caucuses. The coordinating committee selects a national coordinator, secretary, and treasurer from among its ranks. In 2006, the membership began electing a chair, secretary, treasurer and three at-large representatives to the coordinating committee. The coordinating committee, reorganized as the national board, established a subgroup called "Research Divisions." In 2010 the divisions were voted out of the association.

== Activities ==
NACCS hosts an annual conference at which scholars present research papers from the social sciences, humanities, and other fields of study. The first such conference was held in Irvine in 1974, and was titled "Action Research: Community Control." Today, conferences attract from 500 to 1000 participants and as many as 90-110 panels.

The association also awards an annual "NACCS Scholar Award," which is intended to honor a lifetime of accomplishment in the field of Chicano and Chicana studies. Notable past recipients include Carey McWilliams, Américo Paredes, Julián Samora, Tomás Rivera, Rodolfo Acuña, and Gloria Anzaldúa.

Each foco and caucus also has a listserve to keep members updated about association activities.

== Publications ==
On its website, NACCS publishes a web-based Directory of Chicana/o, Latina/o, and Latin American Studies Program, Research and Policy Centers, a regionally-indexed list. It also publishes the proceedings of its annual conferences, a quarterly newsletter,
