= Electoral history of Beto O'Rourke =

Elections featuring American politician

This is the electoral history of Beto O'Rourke, who served as a member of the United States House of Representatives from Texas's 16th congressional district from 2013 to 2019. He previously served in the El Paso City Council from 2005 to 2011. O'Rourke came to national prominence during his 2018 United States Senate campaign in Texas, where he narrowly lost to incumbent Republican Ted Cruz. He later sought the 2020 Democratic nomination for President, but ended his campaign before any votes were cast.

== El Paso City Council elections ==
=== 2005 ===
El Paso City Council 8th district, 2005 election
| Party | Candidate | Votes | % |
|---|---|---|---|
| Nonpartisan | Beto O'Rourke | 2,769 | 56.63% |
| Nonpartisan | Anthony Cobos (incumbent) | 2,121 | 43.37% |
| Total votes | | 4,890 | 100% |

=== 2007 ===
El Paso City Council 8th district, 2007 election
| Party | Candidate | Votes | % |
|---|---|---|---|
| Nonpartisan | Beto O'Rourke (incumbent) | 2,343 | 69.94% |
| Nonpartisan | Trini Acevedo | 1,007 | 30.06% |
| Total votes | | 3,350 | 100% |

== United States House of Representatives elections ==
=== 2012 ===
Texas's 16th congressional district, 2012 Democratic primary
| Party | Candidate | Votes | % |
|---|---|---|---|
| Democratic | Beto O'Rourke | 23,261 | 50.47% |
| Democratic | Silvestre Reyes (incumbent) | 20,440 | 44.35% |
| Democratic | Jerome Tilghman | 1,270 | 2.76% |
| Democratic | Ben E. Mendoza | 701 | 1.52% |
| Democratic | Paul Johnson Jr. | 419 | 0.91% |
| Total votes | | 46,091 | 100% |

Texas's 16th congressional district, 2012 general election
| Party | Candidate | Votes | % |
|---|---|---|---|
| Democratic | Beto O'Rourke | 101,403 | 65.42% |
| Republican | Barbara Carrasco | 51,043 | 32.93% |
| Libertarian | Junart Sodoy | 2,559 | 1.65% |
| Total votes | | 155,005 | 100% |
| Democratic hold | | | |

=== 2014 ===
Texas's 16th congressional district, 2014 Democratic primary
| Party | Candidate | Votes | % |
|---|---|---|---|
| Democratic | Beto O'Rourke (incumbent) | 24,728 | 100.00% |
| Total votes | | 24,728 | 100% |

Texas's 16th congressional district, 2014 general election
| Party | Candidate | Votes | % |
|---|---|---|---|
| Democratic | Beto O'Rourke (incumbent) | 49,338 | 67.49% |
| Republican | Corey Roen | 21,324 | 29.17% |
| Libertarian | Jamie O. Perez | 2,443 | 3.34% |
| Total votes | | 73,105 | 100% |
| Democratic hold | | | |

=== 2016 ===
Texas's 16th congressional district, 2016 Democratic primary
| Party | Candidate | Votes | % |
|---|---|---|---|
| Democratic | Beto O'Rourke (incumbent) | 40,051 | 85.58% |
| Democratic | Ben Mendoza | 6,749 | 14.42% |
| Total votes | | 46,800 | 100% |

Texas's 16th congressional district, 2016 general election
| Party | Candidate | Votes | % |
|---|---|---|---|
| Democratic | Beto O'Rourke (incumbent) | 150,228 | 85.73% |
| Libertarian | Jaime O. Perez | 17,491 | 9.98% |
| Green | Mary L. Gourdoux | 7,510 | 4.29% |
| Total votes | | 175,229 | 100% |
| Democratic hold | | | |

== United States Senate election ==
=== 2018 ===
2018 United States Senate Democratic primary in Texas
| Party | Candidate | Votes | % |
|---|---|---|---|
| Democratic | Beto O'Rourke | 644,632 | 61.81% |
| Democratic | Sema Hernandez | 247,424 | 23.72% |
| Democratic | Edward Kimbrough | 150,858 | 14.47% |
| Total votes | | 1,042,914 | 100% |

2018 United States Senate election in Texas
| Party | Candidate | Votes | % |
|---|---|---|---|
| Republican | Ted Cruz (incumbent) | 4,260,373 | 50.89% |
| Democratic | Beto O'Rourke | 4,045,632 | 48.33% |
| Libertarian | Neal Dikeman | 65,470 | 0.78% |
| Total votes | | 8,371,475 | 100% |
| Republican hold | | | |

== United States Presidential election ==
=== 2020 ===
In 2019, O'Rourke was a candidate for the 2020 Democratic nomination for President of the United States. He dropped out before voting began and endorsed Joe Biden several months later.

== Texas gubernatorial election ==
=== 2022 ===
Democratic primary results
| Party | Candidate | Votes | % |
|---|---|---|---|
| Democratic | Beto O'Rourke | 983,182 | 91.41% |
| Democratic | Joy Diaz | 33,622 | 3.13% |
| Democratic | Michael Cooper | 32,673 | 3.04% |
| Democratic | Rich Wakeland | 13,237 | 1.23% |
| Democratic | Inocencio Barrientez | 12,887 | 1.20% |
| Total votes | | 1,075,601 | 100% |

=== Results ===
2022 Texas gubernatorial election
| Party | Candidate | Votes | % | ±% |
|---|---|---|---|---|
| Republican | Greg Abbott (incumbent) | 4,437,099 | 54.76% | −1.05% |
| Democratic | Beto O'Rourke | 3,553,656 | 43.86% | +1.35% |
| Libertarian | Mark Tippetts | 81,932 | 1.01% | −0.68% |
| Green | Delilah Barrios | 28,584 | 0.35% | N/A |
| American Solidarity | Jacqueline Abernathy | 1,243 | 0.02% | N/A |
| Total votes | | 8,102,908 | 100.00% | N/A |
| Republican hold | | | | |
