= Veronica Escobar =

American politician (born 1969)

- Official portrait, 2021

Co-Chair of the House Democratic Policy and Communications Committee
- In office January 3, 2023 – January 3, 2025 Serving with Dean Phillips (2023), Lori Trahan, and Lauren Underwood
- Leader: Hakeem Jeffries
- Preceded by: Debbie Dingell; Matt Cartwright; Ted Lieu
- Succeeded by: Maxwell Frost

Member of the U.S. House of Representatives from Texas's 16th district
- Incumbent
- Assumed office January 3, 2019
- Preceded by: Beto O'Rourke

County Judge of El Paso County
- In office January 1, 2011 – October 10, 2017
- Preceded by: Anthony Cobos
- Succeeded by: Ruben Vogt

Personal details
- Born: September 15, 1969 (age 57) El Paso, Texas, U.S.
- Party: Democratic
- Spouse: Michael Pleters
- Children: 2
- Education: University of Texas, El Paso (BA); New York University (MA)
- Website: House website Campaign website
- Escobar's voice Escobar supporting the America COMPETES Act of 2022. Recorded February 4, 2022

Veronica Escobar (born September 15, 1969) is an American politician and jurist serving as the U.S. representative for Texas's 16th congressional district, based in El Paso, since 2019. A member of the Democratic Party, she served as an El Paso County commissioner from 2007 to 2011 and the El Paso county judge from 2011 until 2017.

== Early life and education ==
Escobar is a native of El Paso, where she was born in 1969. She grew up near her family's dairy farm with her parents and four brothers. One of her brothers, Gabriel, is a career diplomat who is serving as Chargé d'Affaires ad interim to Brazil as of 2026. Escobar attended Loretto Academy and Burges High School, before getting her bachelor's degree at the University of Texas at El Paso (UTEP) and her master's degree from New York University.

== Early political career ==
Escobar worked as a nonprofit executive and as Raymond Caballero's communications director when he was mayor of El Paso. When Caballero failed to get reelected, Escobar—along with Susie Byrd, attorney Steve Ortega and businessman Beto O'Rourke—considered entering public service; they started to discuss grassroots strategies with the goals of improving urban planning, creating a more diversified economy with more highly skilled jobs, as well as ending systemic corruption among city leadership.

Escobar was elected as El Paso County Commissioner in 2006 and as El Paso County Judge in 2010. O’Rourke, Byrd and Ortega also all ran for office and won; they came to be collectively referred to as "The Progressives." She also taught English and Chicano literature at UTEP and El Paso Community College.

== U.S. House of Representatives ==
=== Elections ===
2018

Escobar resigned from office in August 2017 to run full-time in the 2018 election to succeed Beto O'Rourke in the United States House of Representatives for Texas's 16th congressional district. As the district is a solidly Democratic, majority-Hispanic district, whoever won the Democratic primary was heavily favored in November. Escobar won the six-way Democratic primary with 61% of the vote.

In June 2018, Escobar and O'Rourke led protests in Tornillo, Texas, against the Trump administration family separation policy that involved separating immigrant children from their families. Tornillo is just miles from the Rio Grande, the river that forms the border between the U.S. and Mexico in Texas. The Trump administration had created a "tent-city" in Tornillo, where separated children were being held without their parents. O'Rourke called this practice "un-American" and the responsibility of all Americans.

Escobar won the general election on November 6, defeating Republican Rick Seeberger. She became the first woman to represent the 16th. Escobar and Sylvia Garcia of Houston became the first Latina congresswomen from Texas. Although the 16th has been a majority-Hispanic district since at least the 1970s, Escobar is only the second Hispanic ever to represent it, the first being Silvestre Reyes, O'Rourke's predecessor.

2020

Escobar ran for reelection. She was unopposed in the Democratic primary and faced the Republican nominee, realtor Irene Armendariz-Jackson, in the general election. Escobar won with 64.7% of the vote to Armendariz-Jackson's 35.3%.

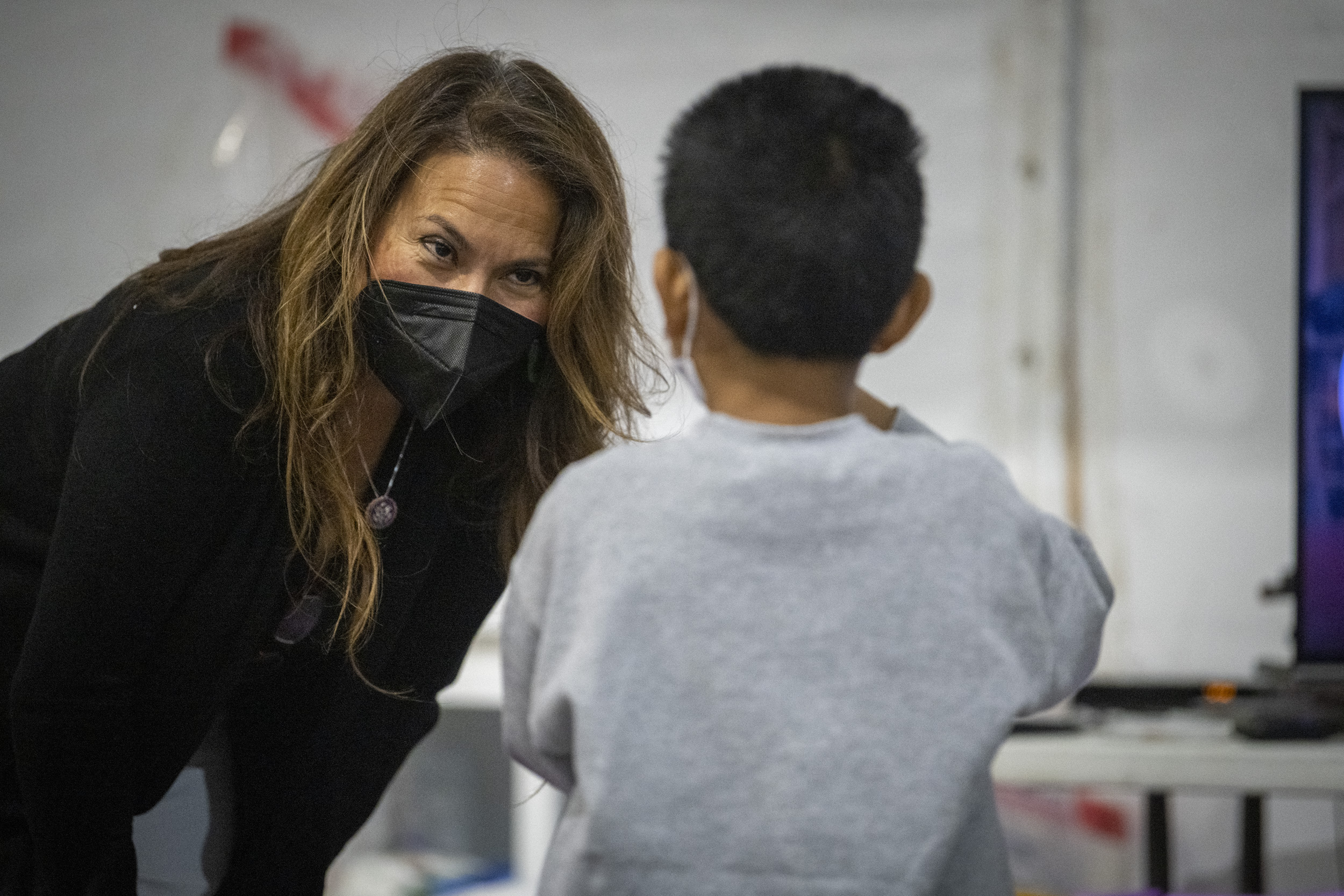
Escobar meets with a migrant child at the CBP processing center in Donna, Texas in May 2021.

=== Tenure ===
On November 13, 2019, Escobar was elected as a freshman class representative in a secret ballot by her peers, filling the role of Katie Hill, who had resigned from Congress.

On February 4, 2020, Escobar delivered the Spanish-language response to President Trump's State of the Union Address. Her remarks touched on healthcare, immigration, the national debt, the importance of diversity, the 2019 El Paso Walmart shooting, wealth inequality, gun violence, and the United States–Mexico–Canada trade agreement. She called Trump and the Republican-controlled Senate "the greatest threat to our security."

=== Committee assignments ===
- Committee on Armed Services
  - Subcommittee on Military Personnel
  - Subcommittee on Readiness
- Committee on the Judiciary
  - Subcommittee on the Constitution, Civil Rights and Civil Liberties
  - Subcommittee on Immigration and Citizenship

=== Caucus memberships ===
- Congressional Equality Caucus
- Congressional Hispanic Caucus
- Congressional Progressive Caucus
- New Democrat Coalition

=== 2024 Democratic National Convention ===
Escobar was one of four chairs of the 2024 Democratic National Convention in Chicago.

== Political positions ==
Escobar voted to provide Israel with support following 2023 Hamas attack on Israel. She has voted with President Joe Biden's stated position 100% of the time in the 117th Congress, according to a FiveThirtyEight analysis. After the longest government shutdown ever ended without Democrats getting their main demand of extending ACA subsidies, she said Schumer "should not" remain minority leader.

=== Animal welfare ===
In March 2022, Escobar and Representative Nancy Mace introduced legislation to prohibit the confinement of pregnant pigs in gestation crates. In 2025, Escobar authored legislation to prohibit the use of "downer" pigs in the food supply and establish federal health and welfare standards in pig farming.

== Electoral history ==
=== 2018 ===
Democratic primary results
| Party | Candidate | Votes | % |
|---|---|---|---|
| Democratic | Veronica Escobar | 31,009 | 61.53 |
| Democratic | Dori Fenenbock | 11,071 | 21.97 |
| Democratic | Norma Chavez | 3,357 | 6.66 |
| Democratic | Enrique Garcia | 2,684 | 5.33 |
| Democratic | Jerome Tilghman | 1,495 | 2.97 |
| Democratic | John Carrillo | 780 | 1.55 |
| Total votes | | 50,396 | 100.0 |

Texas's 16th congressional district
| Party | Candidate | Votes | % |
|---|---|---|---|
| Democratic | Veronica Escobar | 124,437 | 68.46 |
| Republican | Rick Seeberger | 49,127 | 27.03 |
| Independent | Ben Mendoza | 8,147 | 4.48 |
| Independent | Sam Williams (write-in) | 43 | 0.02 |
| Total votes | | 181,754 | 100.0 |
| Democratic hold | | | |

=== 2020 ===
Texas's 16th congressional district
| Party | Candidate | Votes | % |
|---|---|---|---|
| Democratic | Veronica Escobar (incumbent) | 154,108 | 64.72 |
| Republican | Irene Armendariz-Jackson | 84,006 | 35.28 |
| Total votes | | 238,114 | 100.0 |
| Democratic hold | | | |

=== 2022 ===
Democratic primary results
| Party | Candidate | Votes | % |
|---|---|---|---|
| Democratic | Veronica Escobar (incumbent) | 30,954 | 87.96 |
| Democratic | Deliris Montanez Berrios | 4,235 | 12.04 |
| Total votes | | 35,189 | 100.0 |

Texas's 16th congressional district
| Party | Candidate | Votes | % |
|---|---|---|---|
| Democratic | Veronica Escobar (incumbent) | 95,510 | 63.46 |
| Republican | Irene Armendariz-Jackson | 54,986 | 36.54 |
| Total votes | | 150,496 | 100.0 |
| Democratic hold | | | |

=== 2024 ===
Democratic primary results
| Party | Candidate | Votes | % |
|---|---|---|---|
| Democratic | Veronica Escobar (incumbent) | 28,129 | 86.29 |
| Democratic | Leeland White | 4,470 | 13.71 |
| Total votes | | 32,599 | 100.0 |

Texas's 16th congressional district
| Party | Candidate | Votes | % |
|---|---|---|---|
| Democratic | Veronica Escobar (incumbent) | 131,391 | 59.50 |
| Republican | Irene Armendariz-Jackson | 89,281 | 40.43 |
| Independent | Deliris Montanez (write-in) | 156 | 0.07 |
| Total votes | | 220,828 | 100.0 |
| Democratic hold | | | |

== Personal life ==
Escobar and her husband, Michael Pleters, have two children.

== See also ==
- List of Hispanic and Latino American jurists
- List of Hispanic and Latino Americans in the United States Congress
- Women in the United States House of Representatives

U.S. House of Representatives
| Preceded by Beto O'Rourke | Member of the U.S. House of Representatives from Texas's 16th congressional district 2019–present | Incumbent |
U.S. order of precedence (ceremonial)
| Preceded by Madeleine Dean | United States representatives by seniority 198th | Succeeded by Lizzie Fletcher |
