= Pat O'Rourke =

American businessman and politician (1942–2001)

County Judge of El Paso County
- In office 1982–1986
- Preceded by: Udell Moore
- Succeeded by: Luther Jones

Member of the El Paso County Board of County Commissioners from Precinct 4
- In office 1978–1982
- Preceded by: Chuck Mattox
- Succeeded by: Mary Haynes

Personal details
- Born: August 27, 1942 El Paso, Texas, U.S.
- Died: July 3, 2001 (aged 58) Santa Teresa, New Mexico, U.S.
- Party: Republican
- Other political affiliations: Democratic (formerly)
- Spouse(s): Gail McNutt (m. 1964; div. 1966) Melissa Williams (m. 1971)
- Children: 3, including Beto O'Rourke
- Education: University of Texas, El Paso (BS)
- Occupation: Realtor

Pat Francis O'Rourke (August 27, 1942 – July 3, 2001) was an American businessman and politician based in El Paso, Texas. He was the father of politician Beto O'Rourke.

== Early life and education ==
O'Rourke was born at El Paso's old Southwestern General Hospital, the only son of Mildred Rowena, (née Jasper), and John Francis "Frank" O'Rourke, a former baseball player and then manager of the public relations department at Reynolds Electrical and Engineering Company (REECO). He had a half-sister from his mother's previous marriage. His great-grandfather, Bernard O'Rourke, was an Irish Catholic railway worker originally from Glencar, County Leitrim and naturalized as an American citizen in 1868. His first name on his birth certificate was Pat and not Patrick.

He attended Davy Crocket Elementary School and Austin High School before graduating from New Mexico Military Institute. He got his undergraduate degree at Texas Western University (now University of Texas at El Paso) and took courses at the UCLA Anderson School of Management.

== Career ==
By age 25, both of O'Rourke's parents were deceased. His first forays into politics were greatly aided by his uncle, Raymond O'Rourke, head jailer for El Paso County who ultimately held that position for 30 years.

O'Rourke lost his first two races, for a seat on the El Paso Community College Board of Trustees in 1972 and for a seat on the El Paso Community College Board of Trustees in 1976. A friend described him as unmistakably Irish American and he suspected it would be used against him in the mostly Mexican American electorate so he embraced it by campaigning on March 17, 1978, Saint Patrick's Day, dressed up as a leprechaun. Also on March 17, 1978 he gathered friends to jog along Trans Mountain Road, an idea that evolved into the annual Trans Mountain 20-kilometer challenge each Saint Patrick's Day.

From 1978 to 1982, he served as El Paso County commissioner and then from 1982 to 1986 served as El Paso County judge. O'Rourke and El Paso Mayor Jonathan Rogers worked to consolidate some of the governments' services to try to save taxpayer money. O'Rourke did not seek re-election saying publicly among other reasons, his wife and family did not wish him to run again.

In February 1983 while O'Rourke was out of state on vacation, El Paso County Sheriff's deputies, who were installing a two-way radio in O'Rourke's vehicle, discovered a tied condom containing an off-white powder they believed to be either cocaine or heroin. A sheriff's captain ordered the substance destroyed. The incident did not come to light to either O'Rourke or the public until months later. In October 1983, the captain was indicted by a grand jury on charges of official misconduct and tampering with evidence.

From October 1983 to November 1986, he served on the Texas Jails Standards Commission. O'Rourke served as state co-chairman for Jesse Jackson during Jackson's 1988 bid in the Democratic presidential primary having also supported Jackson's 1984 presidential campaign. "I like the guy. He's entertaining, and he has some magic in him," O'Rourke explained a few years later. "Jesse brought more people into the voting booth, and I don't care who you are -- the more people that vote, the better off this country is."

After O'Rourke switched his party affiliation from Democratic to Republican citing his belief that the Democratic Party had lost touch with financial responsibility, he campaigned to for the Republican nomination for the United States House of Representatives. He was defeated in the primary runoff by Chip Taberski in April 1992. In 1996, he was a candidate for county tax assessor-collector and in 1998 he was Republican candidate for county judge, but he was unsuccessful in both races.

== Death ==
On July 3, 2001, O'Rourke, a longtime cycling enthusiast, died while riding his bicycle along the shoulder of Pete Domenici Highway just outside the city limits of El Paso about 30 feet (9.1 m) across the New Mexico state line when he was struck from behind by a 1999 Pontiac Grand Am throwing him 70 feet (21 m) causing severe head injuries; he was pronounced dead at the scene. No charges were filed against the driver in connection with O'Rourke's death, but he was arrested for an outstanding warrant for failure to appear in court for a suspended license citation. O'Rourke's son Beto delivered the eulogy during the funeral service at Saint Patrick's Cathedral.
