= Koughan Memorial Water Tower Park =

Park and water tower in Round Rock, Texas, U.S.

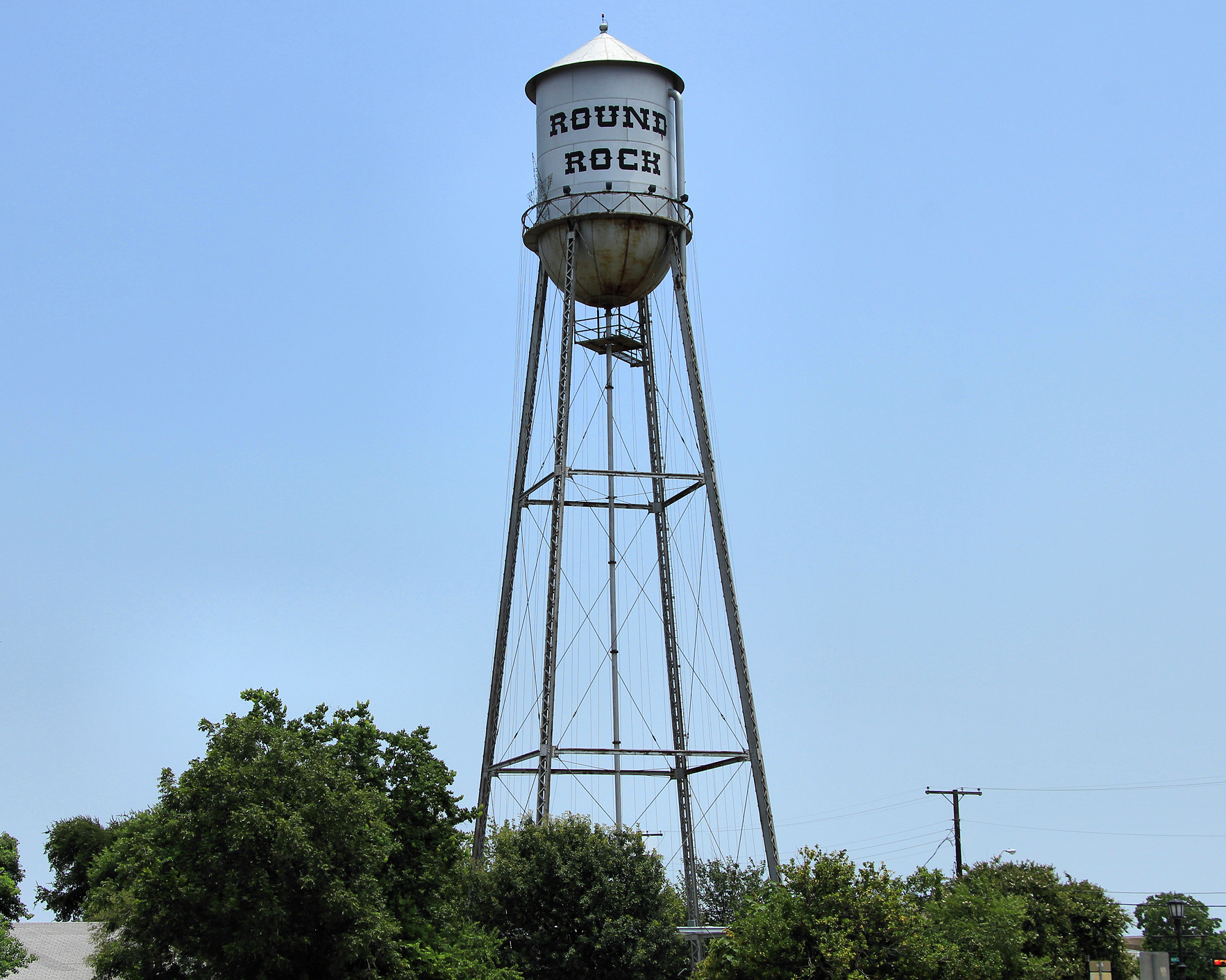
- The park's water tower in 2014

- Location within Texas
- Location: Round Rock, Texas, United States
- Coordinates: 30.50884°N 97.67960°W

Koughan Memorial Water Tower Park is a park with a water tower in Round Rock, Texas, United States.

== History ==
The water tower was built in 1935 as a Works Progress Administration project.

It was renamed after William Koughan, a CPA who had lived on Round Rock Ave, just up the street from the patch of land containing the water tower. After his death in 1998, his widow, Ruth, and some friends raised $40,000 to spruce up the land, which was also across the street from Bill's CPA practice, and turn it into a park bearing his name.

In 2018, the park was the site of a "pop-up event" hosted by Beto O'Rourke.
