= Vote 'Em Out =

Single by Willie Nelson
- Released: October 11, 2018
- Recorded: 2018
- Genre: Country
- Length: 2:22
- Label: Legacy Recordings
- Songwriter: Willie Nelson
- Producer: Buddy Cannon

Willie Nelson singles chronology
"Summer Wind" (2018)	"Vote 'Em Out" (2018)

"Vote 'Em Out" is a single by Willie Nelson, released on October 11, 2018, amidst the 2018 Senate election in Texas.

== Background ==
In June 2018, Willie Nelson released a public statement criticizing the Trump administration family separation policy. During his annual Fourth of July Picnic, Nelson was joined on stage by Beto O'Rourke, a candidate in the 2018 Senate election in Texas. Nelson later gave his endorsement to O'Rourke, amid criticism from the conservative part of his fan base.

On September 29, 2018 Nelson offered a free concert in Austin, Texas, supporting O'Rourke's campaign efforts. At the end of the concert, Nelson debuted his new song "Vote 'Em Out". The track was released as a single on October 11.

On September 25, 2020 Nelson released an animated video on YouTube for "Vote 'Em Out" featuring cartoon characters casting their ballots.
