= Beto O'Rourke =

American politician and musician (born 1972)

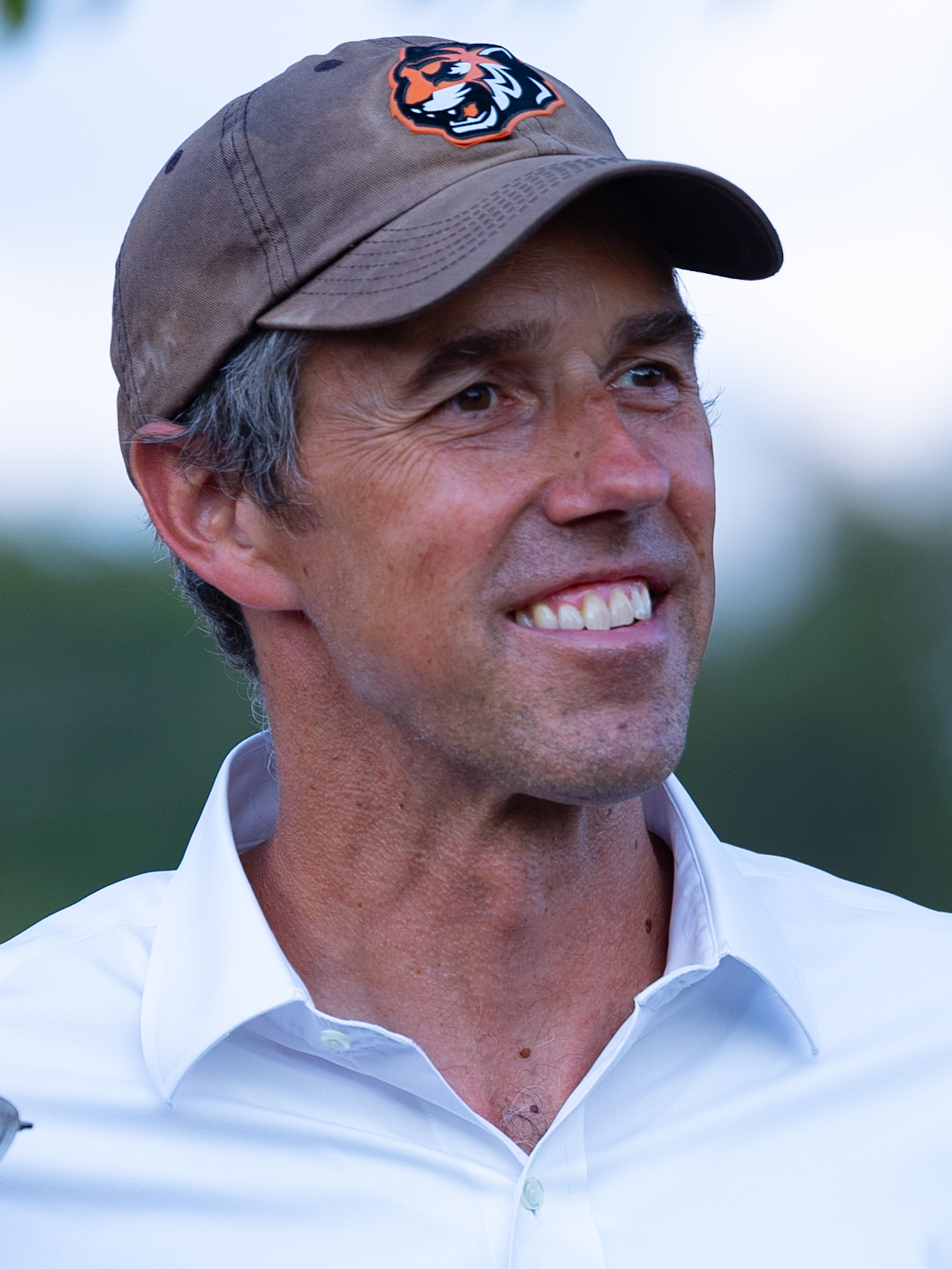
- O'Rourke in 2024

Member of the U.S. House of Representatives from Texas's 16th district
- In office January 3, 2013 – January 3, 2019
- Preceded by: Silvestre Reyes
- Succeeded by: Veronica Escobar

Mayor pro tempore of El Paso
- In office June 14, 2005 – June 20, 2006
- Mayor: John Cook
- Preceded by: Anthony Cobos
- Succeeded by: Presi Ortega

Member of the El Paso City Council from the 8th district
- In office June 1, 2005 – June 27, 2011
- Preceded by: Anthony Cobos
- Succeeded by: Cortney Niland

Personal details
- Born: Robert Francis O'Rourke; September 26, 1972 (age 54) El Paso, Texas, U.S.
- Party: Democratic
- Spouse: Amy Sanders (m. 2005)
- Children: 3
- Relatives: Pat O'Rourke (father)
- Education: Columbia University (BA)

Robert Francis "Beto" O'Rourke (/ˈbɛtoʊ/ BEH-toh; born September 26, 1972) is an American politician who served as the U.S. representative for Texas's 16th congressional district from 2013 to 2019. A member of the Democratic Party, O'Rourke was the party's nominee for the U.S. Senate in 2018, a candidate for the presidential nomination in 2020, and the party's nominee for the 2022 Texas gubernatorial election.

O'Rourke was born into a local political family in El Paso, Texas, and is a graduate of Woodberry Forest School and Columbia University. While studying at Columbia, he began a brief music career as bass guitarist in the post-hardcore band Foss. After his college graduation, he returned to El Paso and began a business career. In 2005, he was elected to the El Paso City Council, serving until 2011; he served as mayor pro tempore during his first year in office. O'Rourke was elected to the U.S. House of Representatives in 2012 after defeating eight-term incumbent Democrat Silvestre Reyes in the primary.

After being re-elected to the House in 2014 and 2016, O'Rourke declined to seek another term in 2018. Instead, he sought the U.S. Senate seat held by Republican Ted Cruz, running a competitive campaign that drew national attention. Despite losing the election to Cruz by a margin of 2.6%, O'Rourke set a record for most votes ever cast for a Democrat in an election in Texas.

On March 14, 2019, O'Rourke announced his candidacy in the 2020 United States presidential election. He suspended his campaign on November 1, 2019, due to a lack of traction and financial issues. He later endorsed Joe Biden on the same day as Amy Klobuchar and Pete Buttigieg.

On March 1, 2022, O'Rourke won the Democratic nomination for the Texas gubernatorial election. He was defeated by Republican incumbent Greg Abbott in the election.

== Early life and education ==
Robert Francis O'Rourke was born on September 26, 1972, at the Hotel Dieu Hospital in El Paso, Texas, to Pat O'Rourke and Melissa Martha O'Rourke. He is a fourth-generation Irish American. In his infancy, his family gave him the nickname "Beto" initially to distinguish him from his namesake grandfather. Pat O'Rourke served in public office in El Paso as County Commissioner and County Judge; (Note: In Texas, the position of county judge is a county's elected chief executive officer, not a judicial role.) he was an associate of Texas governor Mark White, served as the state chairman of Jesse Jackson's 1984 and 1988 presidential campaigns, switched parties in the early 1990s, and made several failed attempts to win election to public office as a Republican. Jesse Jackson conducted a press conference on December 11, 1984, in the den of O'Rourke's boyhood home in Kern Place.

In eighth grade, O'Rourke was introduced to punk rock through the Clash's London Calling (1979), an album he later called "a revelation". By the time he was 14 or 15 years old, he started going to local punk shows. He soon discovered Dischord Records, a Washington, D.C.–based independent label with a catalog of punk music, and began reading punk zines like Maximumrocknroll and Flipside. O'Rourke felt alienated from the City of El Paso as an adolescent in the 1980s. He told The Texas Observer that, in the El Paso of his youth, "There was nothing dangerous. There was no energy. There was no risk." El Paso's punk scene, though small, helped O'Rourke find a sense of community in the city.

As a teenager, O'Rourke was a member of the computer hacker group Cult of the Dead Cow, named after a shut-down Lubbock slaughterhouse. The group "is notorious for releasing tools that allowed ordinary people to hack computers running Microsoft's Windows". At O'Rourke's insistence, the group included female members, making it one of the few groups of that era to do so. O'Rourke has admitted that he stole long-distance phone service during his teen years in order to use his dial-up modem. O'Rourke wrote numerous poems and other texts for Cult of the Dead Cow under the pseudonym "Psychedelic Warlord", a name taken from a 1974 rock song by the band Hawkwind. O'Rourke has expressed regret over some fictional short stories he wrote as a teenager for the cDc private online forum which included sexual and violent themes.

O'Rourke began his education at Escuela Montessori Del Valle preschool and continued to Rivera and Mesita Elementary Schools. In 1988, after two years at El Paso High School, he enrolled in Woodberry Forest School, an all-male boarding school in Madison County, Virginia. O'Rourke attended Columbia University, where in his junior year he co-captained Columbia's heavyweight rowing crew. He graduated in 1995 with a Bachelor of Arts degree in English literature. He is fluently bilingual in English and Spanish.

After graduation, O'Rourke worked as a live-in caretaker and art mover before working for an Internet service provider run by his uncle. He later took a position at H. W. Wilson Company as a proofreader, and wrote short stories and songs in his free time.

O'Rourke returned to El Paso in 1998. At first, he was working with computers as an inventory tracker at his mother's upscale furniture store and living in an apartment building owned by his father. O'Rourke said he wanted to address "brain-drain", or the exodus of youth caused by lack of opportunity. In 2000, he co-founded Stanton Street Technology Group, an Internet services and software company. With O'Rourke himself unable to obtain a loan, his father took out a $20,000 loan on his behalf. O'Rourke's wife, Amy, operated the business until June 2017. For a few years, the company also published an online newspaper, also called Stanton Street; the paper was a mix of arts and entertainment reviews, restaurant reviews and opinion columns that O'Rourke modeled on alternative periodicals like The Village Voice and New York Press. The company made a co-marketing agreement with local TV station, KTSM-TV, allowing StantonStreet.Com and the station's Internet site to share content and TV ads. KTSM's then news director, Eric Pearson, was O'Rourke's brother-in-law.

During his childhood, O'Rourke accompanied his father Pat at campaign stops and other political events. While Pat was charismatic and outgoing, his son was more reserved. Pat would nudge Beto, suggesting he introduce himself to someone. O'Rourke recalled, "I was an awkward and shy kid, so it was the last thing I wanted to do, but now I can look back and bless my experience in it." "Interestingly, his father was involved politically in El Paso growing up, and Beto would go to events...but I never saw Beto engaged with that arena," his mother recalled. O'Rourke cites his work on his magazine, not boyhood exposure to politics, as the reason behind his initial political ideas and ambitions.

== Musical career ==
For me, it was a great opportunity to see the country. You literally were playing for gas money, in a bar, in a club, or in somebody's basement, and that would take you to the next town and the next show.

— O'Rourke on his experience in the band Foss

O'Rourke had a brief career in music during his college years. He joined his first band, called Swipe, after he left El Paso to attend Columbia University in New York. Swipe played shows at bars and clubs in New York and once opened for the Olympia, Washington–based punk band Fitz of Depression.

After being introduced to Bad Brains as a teen, O'Rourke became a fan of punk music. O'Rourke and two friends from El Paso, Mike Stevens and Arlo Klahr, learned to play musical instruments; O'Rourke took up the bass. In 1991, while at Columbia University, the trio recruited drummer Cedric Bixler-Zavala (eventual vocalist for At the Drive-In and The Mars Volta), and together they formed the band Foss. During the summer, they toured the United States and Canada, garnering the support of Feist. The group released a self-titled demo and a 7-inch record, "The El Paso Pussycats", on Western Breed Records in 1993.

O'Rourke also played drums in the band Swedes, who released an album called Summer in 1995. O'Rourke and ex-members of Foss later started two other bands, a rock group called Fragile Gang and a cover band called The Sheeps.

The DIY ethos O'Rourke had first encountered in the punk scene informed some of his later political decisions, such as his Senate campaign's pledge not to accept financial contributions from PACs (political action committees).

== El Paso City Council (2005–2012) ==
In mid-2005, O'Rourke ran for the El Paso City Council on a platform of downtown development and border reform. O'Rourke was inspired by the successful 2001 mayoral run of Ray Caballero, whose platform promoted the idea that El Paso was great. When Caballero failed to get re-elected, O'Rourke considered running for office.

O'Rourke was involved with El Paso civic organizations and nonprofit groups, such as the Rotary Club, United Way, and Center Against Sexual and Family Violence. He was a member of the boards of the El Paso Hispanic Chamber of Commerce and the Institute for Policy and Economic Development at UTEP.

O'Rourke defeated two-term incumbent city councilman Anthony Cobos, 57–43%. Byrd and Ortega were also elected; along with O'Rourke, they came to be referred to as "the Progressives". O'Rourke is one of the youngest representatives ever to have served on the City Council. In 2007, he won re-election to a second term, defeating Trini Acevedo, 70–30%.

On June 14, 2005, at his first city council meeting, O'Rourke was chosen as mayor pro tem by unanimous vote. The mayor pro tem represents the city at meetings and ceremonial occasions when the mayor is unavailable, presides over City Council in the mayor's absence, appoints council members to legislative review committees and generally works in concert with the mayor in a leadership capacity. On June 20, 2006, he relinquished the position, saying, "I said I would take it on condition that someone else would it in a year. ... I hope it becomes a new tradition that every year, a new mayor pro tem is elected."

O'Rourke was a supporter of a redevelopment plan for a depressed area of El Paso's business district with a high vacancy rate, which was also supported by Mayor John Cook and fellow city councilwoman Susie Byrd. The initiative faced opposition from a small group of small businesses and Chicano activists who expressed concern about gentrification and the potential use of eminent domain. O'Rourke responded with an on-foot campaign to residents of the neighborhood and was met with support as well as some cynicism. An activist initiated a recall campaign against O'Rourke (which O'Rourke won), and a few downtown property owners filed two ethics complaints against him; the complaints were dismissed as unfounded. Ultimately, owing to the start of the Great Recession in the United States, the redevelopment plans were only partially realized.

In January 2009, O'Rourke sponsored a resolution calling for "comprehensive examination" of the war on drugs and "the repeal of ineffective marijuana laws". The resolution, unanimously supported by his colleagues on the El Paso City Council, was vetoed by Mayor John Cook. O'Rourke told reporters the reason he spoke up about the war on drugs was the thousands of people who had been killed in the nearby city of Ciudad Juarez, Chihuahua, Mexico. He said, "I hope it has all had its intended effect of starting the national discussion of the wisdom of the War on Drugs...and probably more importantly, helping to bring about a better solution than the status quo, which has led to the terror and tragedy in Juarez."

== U.S. House of Representatives (2013–2019) ==
=== Elections ===
==== 2012 ====
In 2012, O'Rourke filed for the Democratic primary against the eight-term Silvestre Reyes to represent Texas's 16th congressional district. The primary was seen as the real contest in the heavily Democratic, Latino-majority district. Byrd ran O'Rourke's field operation and Escobar was head of communication. O'Rourke won 50.5 percent of the vote, just a few hundred votes above the threshold required to avoid a runoff against Reyes. He was contrasted with Reyes in his support for LGBT rights and drug liberalization. His campaign was largely on foot, and he reportedly knocked on 16,000 doors. He defeated his Republican opponent, Barbara Carrasco, in the general election with 65 percent of the vote. Upon O'Rourke's election, the district was no longer represented in the Congressional Hispanic Caucus, a 26-member group established in 1976, because he lacks Hispanic heritage. As the district was 80 percent Hispanic, with 77.6 percent of Hispanics being of voting-age, some officials, including David Austin, the El Paso–based border representative for the U.S./Mexico Border Counties Coalition, argued that he should be permitted to join. For his part, O'Rourke said he respected the caucus's bylaws.

==== 2014 ====
During his bid for re-election in the fall of 2014, O'Rourke donated at least $28,000 from his own campaign funds to fellow Democratic candidates for House seats. O'Rourke was re-elected in 2014 with 67 percent of the vote.

==== 2016 ====
In October 2015, O'Rourke announced his bid for a third term in 2016. He won the Democratic primary and defeated his Green and Libertarian opponents in the general election. When Nancy Pelosi faced a leadership challenge from Rep. Tim Ryan of Ohio, O'Rourke backed Ryan. O'Rourke said that he believed in term limits, and therefore that it was time for new leadership. He had given himself a term limit in the House, and promised not to serve any more than 12 years in the Senate if elected.

O'Rourke gave up his congressional seat to run for Senate in 2018.

=== Tenure ===
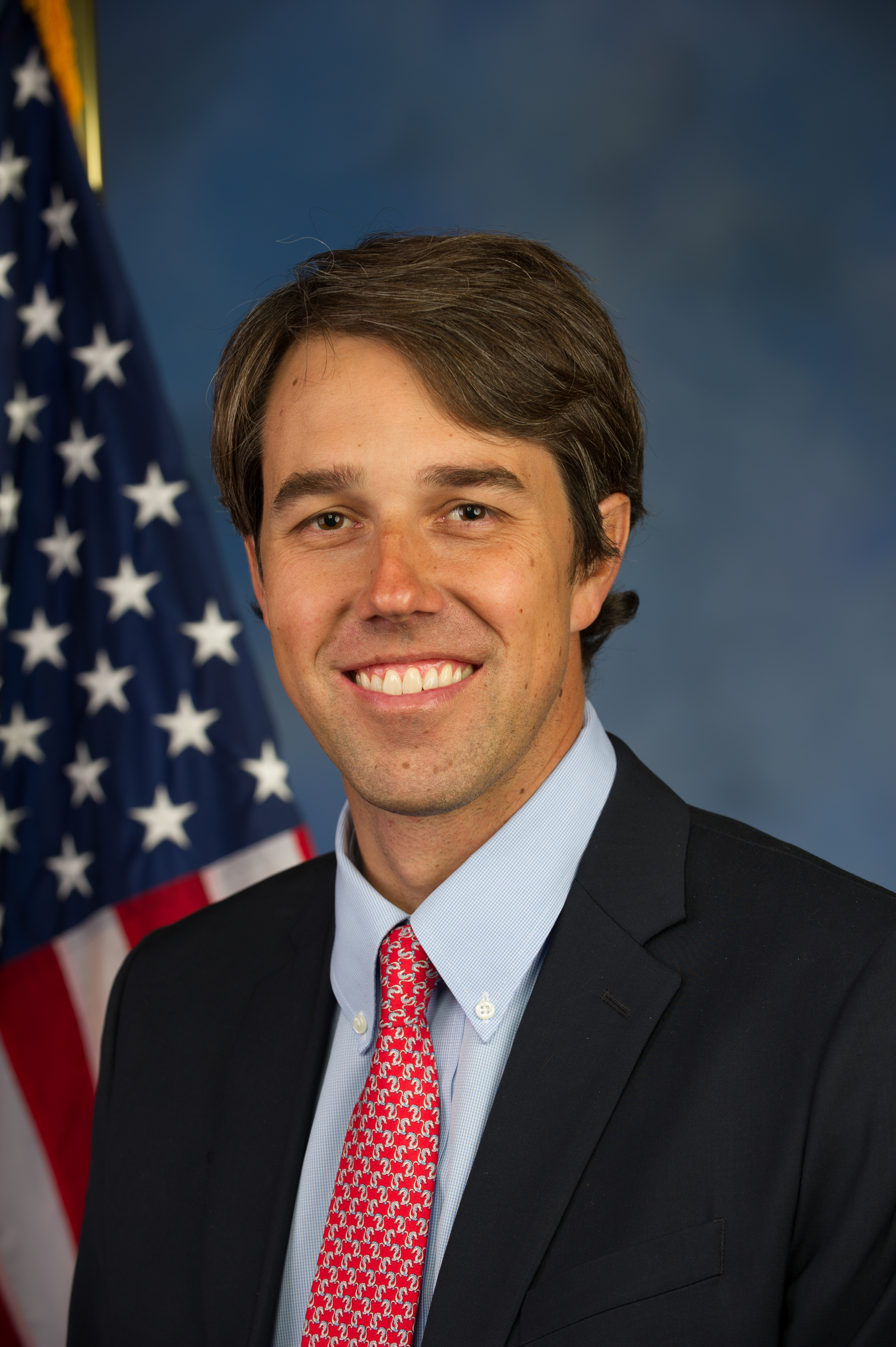
Beto O'Rourke 113th Congress Portrait

As a Congressman, he held at least one town hall meeting every month. In March 2013, O'Rourke and Republican Steve Pearce of New Mexico introduced the Border Enforcement Accountability, Oversight, and Community Engagement Act, legislation proposed to establish an ombudsman within the Department of Homeland Security that would investigate allegations of violence and civil-rights violations by the U.S. Customs and Border Protection, create a commission that would overview the agency's policies and provide insight on how to spend its $18 billion annual budget, increase the training required for officers and agents, and establish protocols under which the CBP would be required to report deaths at the border or agents' use of force. He co-sponsored the Consolidated and Further Continuing Appropriations Act, which was enacted in 2014. Notably, Section 506 allowed the CBP to enter into public-private partnerships with local entities to help fund overtime pay to customs officers at ports of entry, which helped fund the personnel to lower wait times at the border. El Paso was one of five cities chosen to participate in the program.

In November 2014, O'Rourke opposed Obama's deferred action policy that used an executive action to bypass Congress in order to spare approximately 5 million undocumented immigrants from deportation, saying "the motive is noble, but the means are really hard to stomach."

O'Rourke was one of six members of Congress who took a six-day trip to Israel that included meetings with Israeli and Palestinian peace negotiators, political leaders and residents. O'Rourke's previous decisions to vote against U.S. funding for Israel's Iron Dome missile defense system and not attend Israel's prime minister's address to Congress had been controversial; the bill was easily passed in the House, with a 395–8 vote. While saying he was not against funding the project, he was reluctant to support sending $225 million to Israel without any debate or discussion, and said that the US's policy of "unequivocal support at times has been damaging to Israel."

In June 2016, O'Rourke endorsed Hillary Clinton for president, being one of the last Democratic congressmen to support her during the primary. As a sitting member of Congress, O'Rourke was a superdelegate to the Democratic National Convention.

In 2017, the congressman, along with Steve Pearce of New Mexico and Eric Swalwell of California, sponsored the American Families United Act, which promoted the idea that US citizens have the right to sponsor their spouses for legal immigration.

=== Committee assignments ===
- Committee on Armed Services
  - Subcommittee on Emerging Threats and Capabilities
  - Subcommittee on Strategic Forces
- Committee on Veterans' Affairs
  - Subcommittee on Disability Assistance and Memorial Affairs
  - Subcommittee on Oversight and Investigations

=== Caucus memberships ===
- New Democrat Coalition
- Congressional Arts Caucus

== 2018 U.S. Senate campaign ==
Final results by county in 2018: Ted Cruz: >90%; 80–90%; 70–80%; 60–70%; 50–60%; Beto O'Rourke: 70–80%; 60–70%; 50–60%; 40–50%

As O'Rourke was considering entering the 2018 U.S. Senate race in Texas, political experts considered him a "longshot" candidate. Ben Terris of The Washington Post said he was suffering from a "bug" causing "mass delusions that the old rules of politics no longer apply." He asked, "Can a Democrat really win in this deeply red state—against Cruz, who will be running one of the best-financed campaigns in the country? And can he do so on a positive message about Mexicans in an era when calling them rapists helped make a man president?"

No Democrat had been elected to statewide office in Texas since 1994. On March 31, 2017, O'Rourke formally announced his candidacy for the United States Senate seat held by incumbent Republican Ted Cruz. In March 2018, O'Rourke became the Democratic Party nominee, winning 61.8 percent of the primary vote. O'Rourke campaigned in all of Texas's 254 counties. He said he planned to run a positive campaign, not focused on Donald Trump or Ted Cruz.

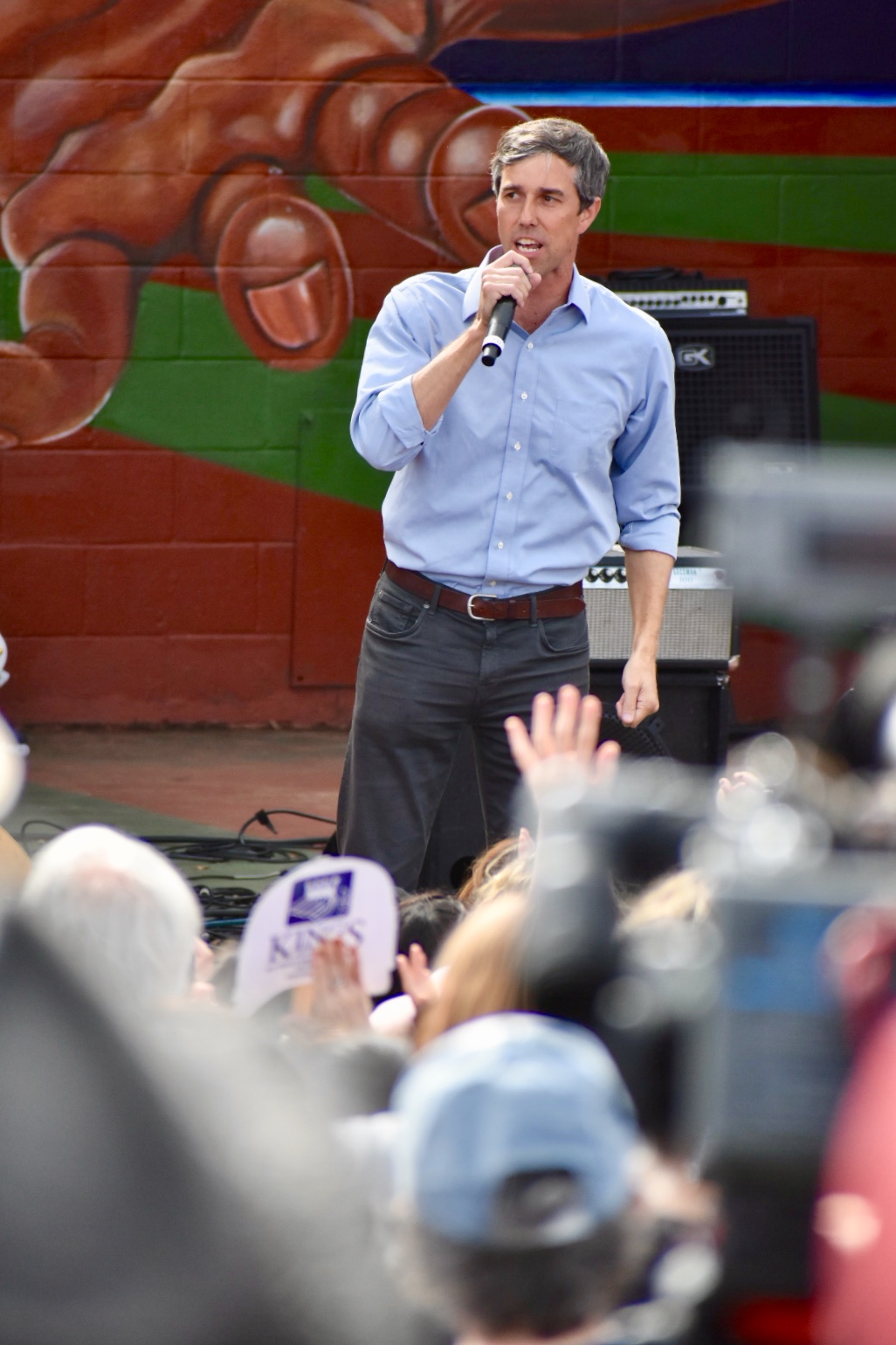
Beto O'Rourke during a rally in Austin, Texas, November 2018

O'Rourke's campaign received significant national attention for its ability to draw large crowds and extensive use of social media. He ran his campaign without professional pollsters or consultants, and relied on volunteers with no experience running a political campaign. His campaign employed the use of mass text messages. According to the 2018 third-quarter report from the FEC, his campaign spent US$7.3 million on digital advertising alone (in contrast with Cruz's $251,000). His first ad was filmed on an iPhone.

O'Rourke often highlighted his days as a rock musician with Foss in interviews. By March 2018, Dan Solomon of Texas Monthly remarked that O'Rourke "seemingly can't escape a single profile without the words 'punk rock Democrat' appearing in the headline". Political observers and journalists felt that O'Rourke's punk past became an important element of his image and political outlook. In an op-ed for The New York Times, Mimi Swartz expressed her belief that O'Rourke's former membership in a punk band had likely boosted his appeal with millennials.

O'Rourke posted to social media daily, including Instagram, Twitter, and Facebook, and livestreamed his activities traveling the state, such as skateboarding in a Whataburger parking lot, washing clothes at a laundromat, and "blockwalking" in his constituents' neighborhoods. He encouraged supporters to post selfies they had taken with him to social media. Some of his videos went viral, including his position on NFL players "taking a knee" and police brutality against unarmed black men. Supporters said O'Rourke's "promise of compassion", more than any specific policy position, drew their support.

=== Funding ===
O'Rourke pledged not to accept PAC contributions for his Senate campaign. He raised $2 million within the first three months, mostly from small donations. During the campaign, PolitiFact rated his claim of not taking PAC money as "true". He received his first major organizational endorsement from End Citizens United in June 2017, which found that he had raised triple the funds of Cruz without accepting corporate special interest money. In the second quarter of 2018, he raised $10.4 million to Cruz's $4.6 million, with each candidate having raised $23 million by September 1. O'Rourke raised more than $38 million in the third quarter, three times Cruz's totals for the same period. It is the most raised in a U.S. Senate race in history. According to his campaign, the donations came from 802,836 individual contributions, mostly from Texas. When asked if he would share the funds with Democrats in other races, he declined, saying that he wanted to honor "the commitment that those who've contributed to this campaign have made to me." O'Rourke raised $80 million for the campaign, which was the highest amount ever raised by a U.S. Senate candidate.

=== Debates ===
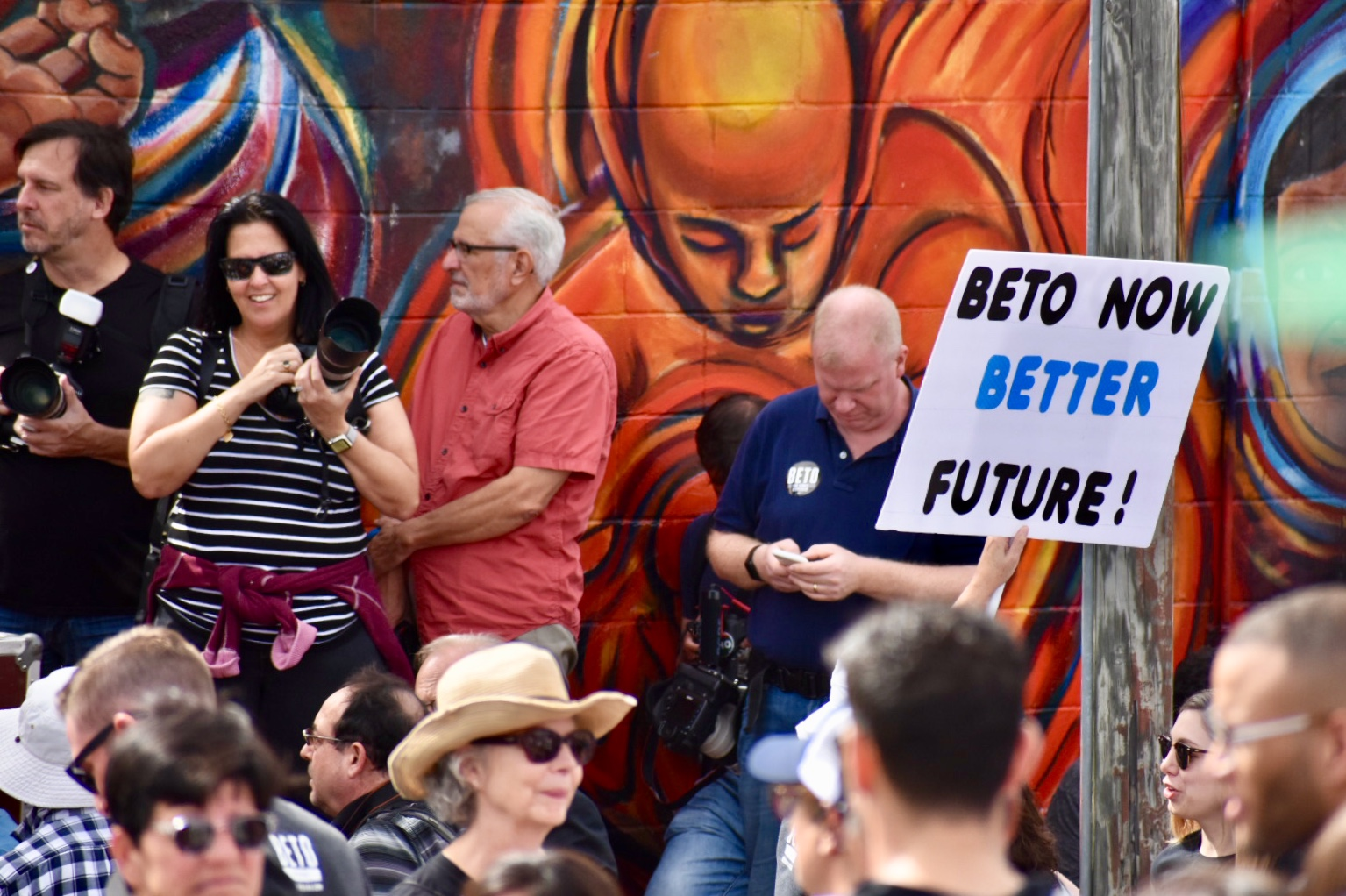
O'Rourke senatorial campaign rally in Austin, Texas, November 2018

The first of three scheduled debates between O'Rourke and Ted Cruz took place on September 21, 2018. The candidates disagreed on gun rights, immigration, marijuana, the "take a knee" controversy, and the confirmation of Supreme Court nominee Brett Kavanaugh. At the end of the debate, the moderator asked the candidates to "say something nice about each other". O'Rourke praised Cruz's parenting. Cruz compared O'Rourke to Bernie Sanders, saying he "admired [his] willingness to stand up for socialist beliefs and high taxes." O'Rourke replied, "True to form." Analysts described Cruz as more experienced and aggressive, but said O'Rourke won over the crowd.

Cruz declined to participate in the third, town hall-style debate for CNN held on October 18, 2018, in McAllen, Texas. O'Rourke agreed to attend the town hall meeting alone. During the meeting, O'Rourke said he did not see himself running for president because he has young children. He said he regretted calling Ted Cruz "Lyin' Ted", a nickname given to Cruz by Donald Trump. He confirmed that he would vote to impeach and indict Trump. He defended his Spanish nickname against accusations of cultural appropriation.

=== Endorsements ===
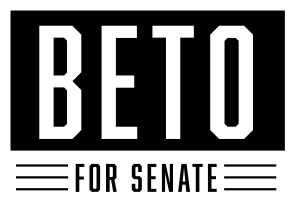
O'Rourke senatorial campaign logo

O'Rourke's Senate bid was endorsed by the Houston Chronicle, the Dallas Morning News, and the Fort Worth Star-Telegram. Singer and activist Willie Nelson endorsed O'Rourke and held a rally for him on September 29 in Austin, Texas; Nelson said, "Beto embodies what is special about Texas, an energy and an integrity that is completely genuine." At the end of the rally, Nelson debuted his new election-inspired song "Vote 'Em Out". Other celebrity endorsements included Beyoncé, Khalid, Aaron Jones, Eva Longoria, LeBron James, Jim Carrey, Travis Scott, Ellen DeGeneres, Lin-Manuel Miranda, and Kelly Rowland.

=== Polls and news coverage ===
On September 18, 2018, a Quinnipiac poll based on phone interviews put Cruz nine points ahead of O'Rourke among likely voters, but a September 19 Ipsos online poll done in conjunction with Reuters and the University of Virginia showed O'Rourke leading Cruz by two points. Going into the third debate on October 18, 2018, a CNN poll, conducted by SSRS, showed Cruz leading the campaign 52 percent to 45 percent among likely voters.

The media made comparisons between O'Rourke's Senate campaign and Obama's 2008 campaign for president, drawing parallels between their charismatic speaking styles, optimistic tones, and the nationwide attention their campaigns generated. Peter Hamby of Vanity Fair compared the energy at O'Rourke's rallies to the energy at Obama's rallies in 2007.

=== Results ===
On November 6, 2018, Cruz defeated O'Rourke, 50.9%–48.3%. Despite his loss, O'Rourke was credited for the election of several down-ticket candidates of the Democratic Party, which some called the "Beto Effect". For example, Republicans lost control of the Texas Third and Fifth Courts of Appeals in the 2018 elections. Of 150 state House seats, 12 formerly Republican seats were taken by Democrats, as well as two of the state's 31 state Senate seats. O'Rourke received over four million votes, compared to Hillary Clinton, who received only 3.9 million votes in the 2016 presidential election in Texas, and David Alameel, the Democratic nominee in the 2014 Texas Senate race, who received only 1.6 million votes. O'Rourke set a record for most votes ever cast for a Democrat in Texas history, later surpassed by Joe Biden, MJ Hegar, Kamala Harris, and Colin Allred in the 2020 and 2024 presidential and US Senate elections.

== 2020 presidential campaign ==
O'Rourke presidential campaign logo

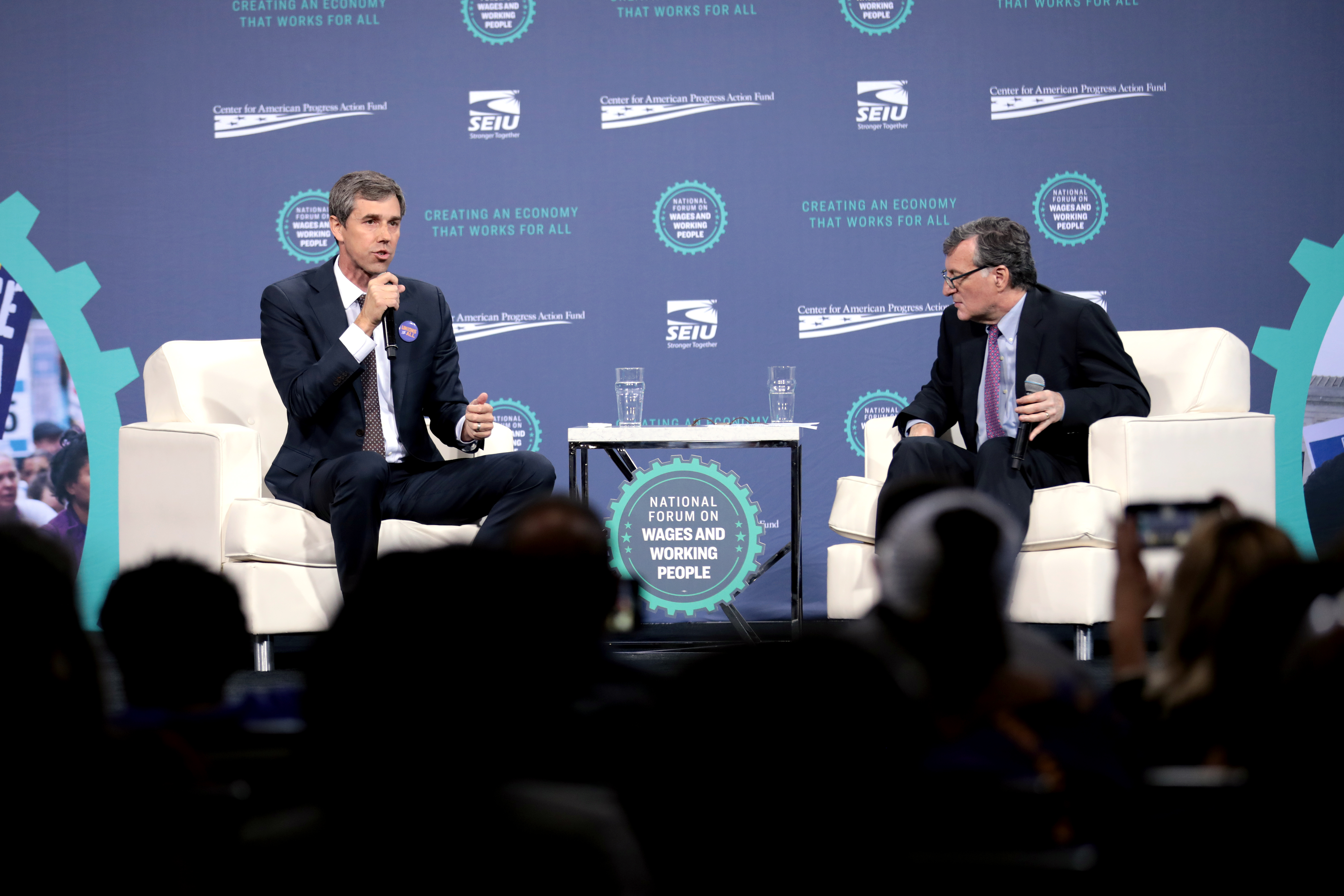
O'Rourke at a presidential campaign event in April 2019

In late 2018, speculation began that O'Rourke might run in the United States presidential election in 2020. Prior to the midterm elections, The New Republic said O'Rourke's Senate campaign was the beginning of a bid for the presidency, despite calling it "journalistic hedging", or a justification for the media extensively covering a candidate who was expected to lose his race.

Democratic strategist Maria Cardona said he has "name recognition, a widely successful fundraising operation, a young fresh face with a sprinkling of woke, a cool persona, a new perspective, he speaks Spanish and would be an exciting and upbeat candidate." The possibility of an O'Rourke candidacy made some Democratic party donors hesitant to commit to other candidates.

On March 13, El Paso TV station KTSM-TV reported that O'Rourke had decided to run for president in 2020. O'Rourke confirmed speculation the following day by announcing that he was entering the presidential race. According to Politico, during his presidential race, O'Rourke presented his 2018 loss to Cruz as a prominent selling point.

O'Rourke announced the end of his campaign for president on November 1, 2019. He endorsed Joe Biden at a rally in Dallas, Texas, on March 2, 2020, one day before Super Tuesday.

== 2022 Texas gubernatorial election ==
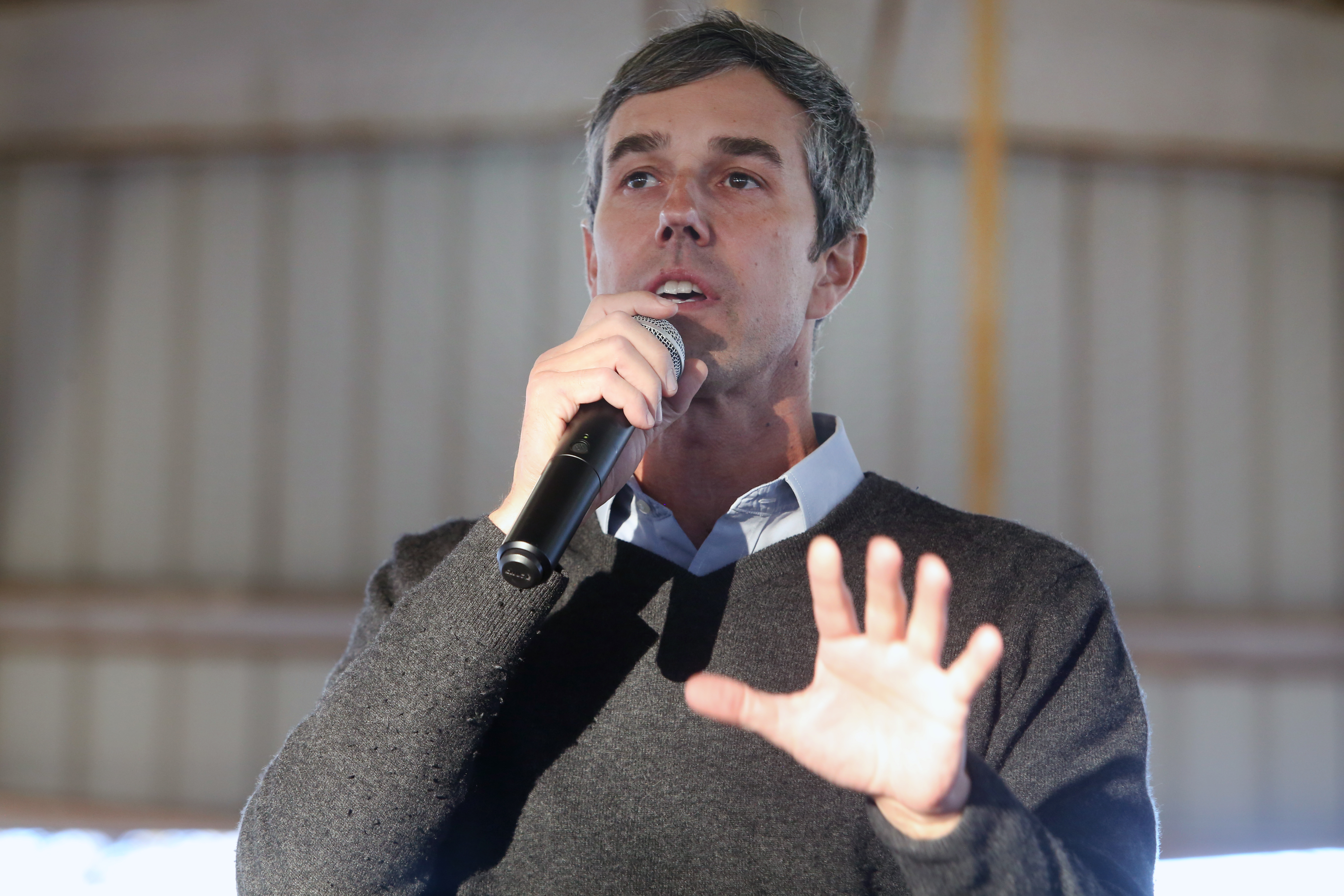
O'Rourke campaigning in Wichita Falls, Texas

O'Rourke announced his bid for Governor of Texas in the 2022 gubernatorial election on November 15, 2021. He challenged incumbent Republican Greg Abbott. During his announcement video, O'Rourke called the 2021 Texas power crisis a "symptom of a much larger problem". With no serious primary challenge, O'Rourke won the Democratic nomination for governor in March 2022.

Given Texas's Republican lean, polls showed O'Rourke as the underdog in the race against Abbott. In the general election, O'Rourke was defeated by Abbott, earning 43.8% of the vote to the latter's 54.9%.

The gubernatorial election marked O'Rourke's third consecutive failed run for elected office and raised questions regarding his political future.

== 2019–2021 activities ==
Logo for "Powered by People", the political action committee O'Rourke launched in December 2019

In December 2019, O'Rourke founded the political action committee "Powered by People". The group is a hybrid PAC, which works like a super PAC and a traditional PAC.

After his 2020 presidential campaign ended, O'Rourke campaigned for Texas House of Representatives candidates such as Eliz Markowitz and Lorraine Birabil.

During the multiple crises that Texas faced as a result of the February 13–17, 2021 North American winter storm, O'Rourke organized virtual phone banks to perform wellness calls and offer assistance to senior citizens. He claimed that the volunteers he had organized had made 784,000 phone calls in a single day on February 18, 2021.

== Political positions ==
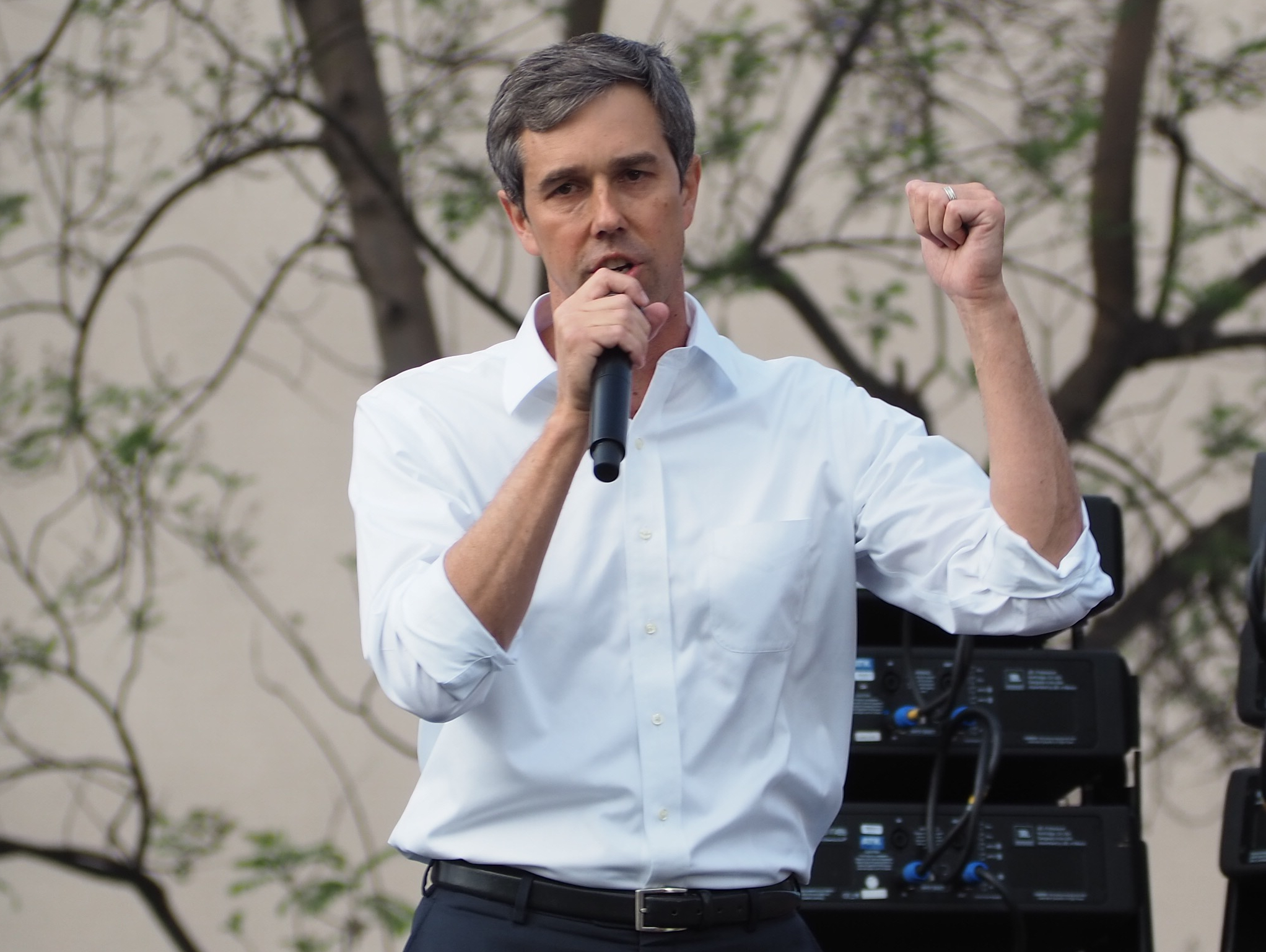
O'Rourke rally at Los Angeles Trade–Technical College

Political analysts classify O'Rourke as a progressive, liberal, neoliberal, or moderate. During his time in Congress, O'Rourke was a member of the New Democrat Coalition, a Third Way, pro-business caucus. The National Journal rates him 93% liberal and 7% conservative. Describing himself, O'Rourke has said that he does not know where he falls on the political spectrum. He has sponsored bipartisan bills as well as broken with his party on issues like trade.

GovTrack placed O'Rourke near the ideological center of the Democratic Party; American for Democratic action gave him a liberal rating of 90 percent, while the American Conservative Union gave him an 8% conservative rating. According to FiveThirtyEight, which tracks congressional voting records, O'Rourke voted in line with Donald Trump 30.1 percent of the time during the 115th Congress.

=== Bipartisanship ===
Allegheny College bestowed the 2018 Prize for Civility in Public Life to O'Rourke together with Will Hurd, a Republican representative from Texas. In March 2017, facing snowstorm-induced flight cancellations, O'Rourke and Hurd, both stuck in San Antonio, needed to get back to Washington for a House vote. They rented a car and embarked on a 1,600 mi (2,600 km) drive that they captured on Facebook Live. O'Rourke and Hurd have worked collaboratively on legislation since the road trip.

=== Business ===
O'Rourke supports stronger antitrust laws to break up monopolies which he believes "stifle competition and innovation." He promotes industry and business regulations meant to promote competition, help the economy to grow, and protect consumers. He believes, "We must connect those out of work with the high value jobs being created right here in Texas by investing in the training, certification and apprenticeship programs that make it possible." He has received high scores from labor unions with lifetime and yearly position scores of 90–100 percent from the AFL–CIO and a 95 percent lifetime score from AFSCME.

=== Crime ===
In an essay he wrote for Houston Chronicle, he repeated a common refrain of his campaign, that "Harris County Jail is the largest provider of mental health services in our state," and quoted the statistic that "the jail has more people receiving psychiatric treatment every day than the nine state mental hospitals in Texas combined." He proposed that politicians work to eliminate private, for-profit prisons, end the "war on drugs", stop using mandatory minimum sentencing for non-violent drug offenses, end cash bail that disproportionately affects those unable to pay bail with longer jail sentences, and provide reentry programs to reduce recidivism for non-violent criminals.

=== Drugs ===
O'Rourke favors the legalization of cannabis. In 2011, O'Rourke co-authored a book, Dealing Death and Drugs: The Big Business of Dope in the U.S. and Mexico, which in part argues for an end to the prohibition of marijuana to reduce drug-related violence and undermine the finances of the Mexican drug cartels. He has called for the arrest records of individuals sentenced for possession of small amounts of cannabis to be expunged. During the 2018 Senate campaign, O'Rourke's opponent, Ted Cruz, claimed that O'Rourke sought to legalize heroin; in 2009 when O'Rourke was an El Paso city council member he called for "honest, open national debate on ending the prohibition on narcotics".

=== Education ===
O'Rourke favors increasing federal aid to public schools in low-income communities. He believes that teachers and local education officials should have more autonomy in setting classroom standards while reducing the current emphasis on "arbitrary, high-stakes tests". During his 2020 presidential election campaign, O'Rourke released a $500 billion education plan "committed to closing funding gaps [and] creating incentives for states and districts to guarantee fair funding for public schools and pay teachers professional wages."

Additionally, during his 2022 gubernatorial campaign in Texas, O'Rourke supported increasing teacher's salaries and funding to public schools. He also opposed school vouchers, claiming that voucher systems lead to money flowing to private schools instead of public schools. Further, he advocated that public schools should receive funding based on student enrollment figures instead of attendance figures, arguing that the current attendance-based system deprives public schools of funding to educate the estimated 260,000 Texas public school students who do not attend school regularly. O'Rourke said he would focus less on cultural issues in education, like critical race theory and transgender children in sports- key issues for some conservative politicians- and focus more on educational outcomes such as "reading, graduation and college preparedness."

=== Environment ===
While attending Woodberry Forest School, O'Rourke along with a circle of friends founded an environmental group called the Terra Interest Society. Before he was elected to city council, he joined neighborhood and community efforts to stop the re-permitting of the local ASARCO copper smelter, and once he was on the city council, he made several efforts to ensure that the copper smelter did not re-open.

O'Rourke supports efforts to combat global warming. He has advocated putting a price on carbon emissions and wants to substantially increase the use of renewable energy. He has been a vocal critic of the Trump Administration's elimination of greenhouse gas regulations and the shrinking of the budget for environmental projects.

In 2012, O'Rourke stated that "in tackling climate change and the greatest environmental threat we have ever faced, we need to take unprecedented action in building a foundation for a clean energy economy". He added, "Educating our fellow Americans about this threat to our quality of life is important to our success, and I will do all I can to make this issue a top priority in Congress."

O'Rourke has introduced legislation to establish a national monument at Castner Range, near El Paso, and successfully included a provision in the National Defense Authorization Act to protect the area, which includes a historic military training facility.

O'Rourke holds a lifetime voting record of 95 percent and a 2017 score of 100 percent with the League of Conservation Voters' national environmental ranking.

=== Foreign policy ===
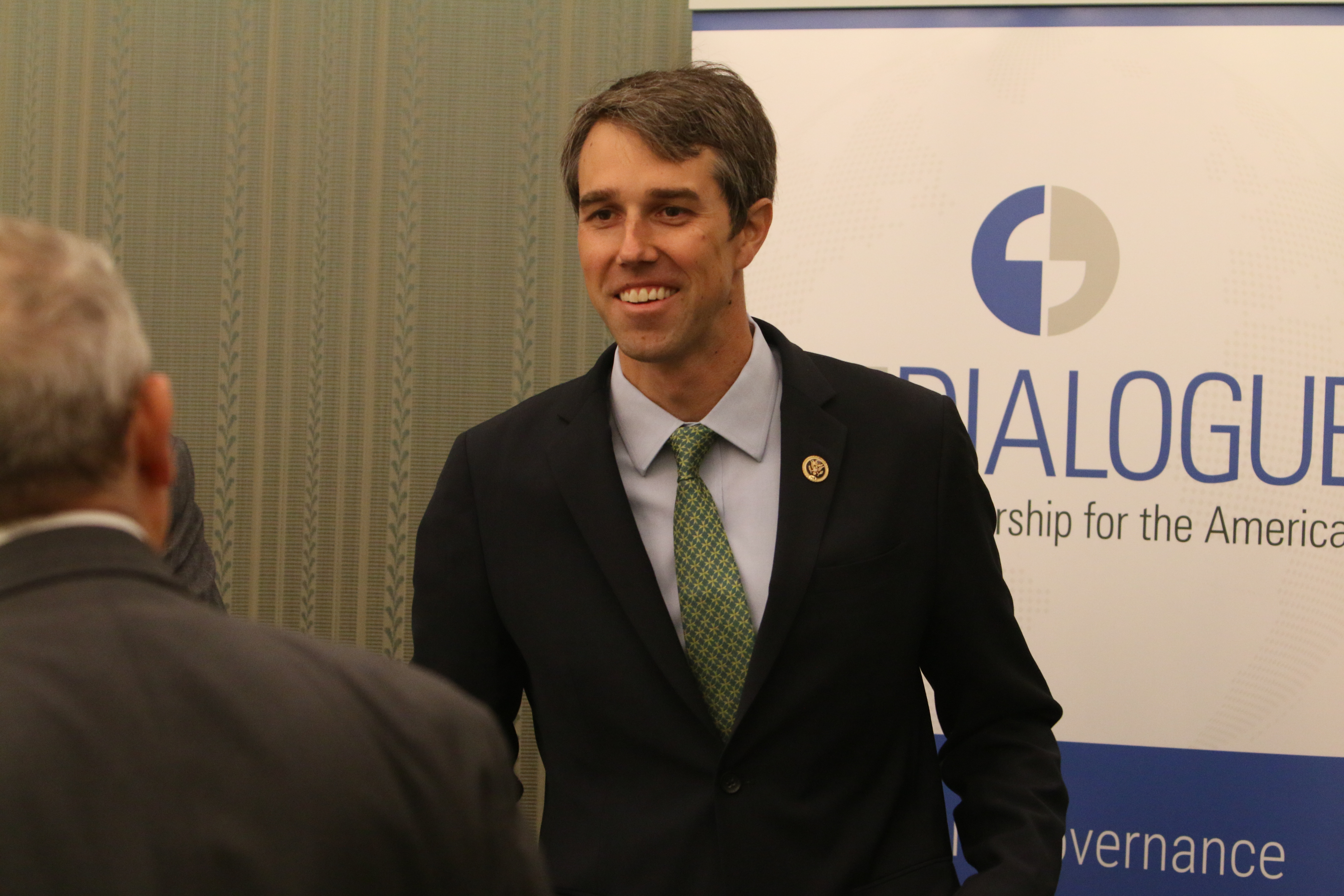
O'Rourke at the Inter-American Dialogue conference in 2016

O'Rourke criticized Israel's actions during the 2014 Israel–Gaza conflict and voted against funding Israel's Iron Dome missile defense system. O'Rourke criticized Israeli Prime Minister Netanyahu following his comments about annexing the settlements in the occupied West Bank after the 2019 Israeli election, calling him a "racist". In April 2019, he called the U.S.–Israel relationship "one of the most important relationships that we have on the planet."

O'Rourke criticized Saudi Arabia's human rights abuses and the intervention it leads in support of the government of Yemen against the Houthis. In 2016, O'Rourke voted against the Justice Against Sponsors of Terrorism Act, which allows relatives of victims of the September 11 attacks to sue Saudi Arabia for its government's alleged role in the attacks. In October 2018, after President Trump indicated the U.S. would not sanction Saudi Arabia over the killing of Jamal Khashoggi, O'Rourke stated: "Saudi Arabia must be held accountable. We must stop rewarding their bad behavior, whether it's what they've just done in the murder of a journalist or their export of those who are spreading a hateful ideology or their indiscriminately bombing civilians in Yemen."

O'Rourke supported the Iran nuclear deal regarding Iran's development of weapons of mass destruction. In August 2017, O'Rourke criticized Trump's hard-line stance towards North Korea, saying that "We must not allow this president to sleepwalk this country, or tweet this country, into war with North Korea." In March 2019, O'Rourke called for ending the U.S.–led Iraq War and War in Afghanistan. O'Rourke opposed the U.S. involvement in the Syrian Civil War and providing arms to the rebel fighters in Syria. He also criticized the NATO-led military intervention in Libya a "factor in the destabilization of the Middle East and the rise of ISIS." O'Rourke supported legislation to curtail NSA's broad and unwarranted surveillance of U.S. and foreign citizens.

In July 2018, O'Rourke said that Trump's performance while attending the 2018 Russia–United States Summit in Helsinki warranted impeachment. Addressing the Trump–Putin joint press conference of July 16, he said standing "on stage in another country with the leader of another country who wants to and has sought to undermine this country, and to side with him over the United States—if I were asked to vote on this I would vote to impeach the president." On March 23, 2019, O'Rourke accused President Trump of collusion with Russia to "undermine and influence" U.S. elections.

In March 2019, O'Rourke said regarding the China–United States trade war that President Trump had a "legitimate" cause and "We want him to be successful in this, but as I was reminded by a fellow Iowan, when have we ever gone to war, including a trade war without allies?"

In an interview with ABC, O'Rourke suggested that the United States address the migrant caravan by investing in stability in countries where the migrants originate, countries in the Northern Triangle of Central America. O'Rourke said that U.S. involvement in Central America "has not been a very positive one over the last 60 years. You can go back to the coup [in Guatemala] that overthrew Jacobo Arbenz in 1954, fully backed by the Eisenhower administration and the Dulles brothers, who had an interest in the United Fruit company, whose fight with the government really precipitated the crisis that led to the coup."

In February 2024, O'Rourke expressed support of a campaign to vote "uncommitted" in the 2024 Michigan Democratic presidential primary, arguing it would put pressure on President Biden to bring an end to the Gaza war.

=== Guns ===
On the evening of June 22, 2016, O'Rourke participated in the sit-in in the House of Representatives that attempted to force a vote on gun control legislation. When the Republicans ordered C-SPAN to turn off its normal coverage of the chamber, O'Rourke and Representative Scott Peters transmitted images by cell phone to social media for C-SPAN to broadcast.

On March 7, 2018, O'Rourke told Alisyn Camerota of CNN: "We have a great tradition and culture of gun ownership and gun safety for hunting, for sport, for self-defense... I think that can allow Texas to take the lead on a really tough issue, which the country is waiting for leadership and action on."

He supports universal background checks for all firearm purchases.

After the 2019 El Paso Walmart shooting, he called for a complete ban on the sale and possession of assault rifles and high-capacity magazines as well as suggesting a mandatory buy-back program to remove such existing assault weapons and magazines. In September 2019, O'Rourke reaffirmed his commitment to mandatory assault weapon buybacks in a tweet. During a live televised interview on October 16, 2019, MSNBC cable news-show host Joe Scarborough asked O'Rourke how he, as president, would respond to non-compliance from those assault rifle owners who regard such a mandatory program as "an unjust law and unconstitutional." O'Rourke replied: "There have to be consequences, or else there is no respect for the law… In that case, I think there would be a visit by law enforcement to recover that firearm and to make sure that it is purchased."

In a September 19, 2019, Democratic presidential debate, O'Rourke again called for a mandatory buyback of assault weapons saying "Hell yes, we're going to take your AR-15, your AK-47." Democratic senator Chris Coons of Delaware lamented on CNN that O'Rourke's stance could haunt Democrats, because "that clip will be played for years at Second Amendment rallies with organizations that try to scare people by saying, 'Democrats are coming for your guns'".

On May 25, 2022, O'Rourke confronted Texas governor Greg Abbott during a press conference about the Robb Elementary School shooting that had occurred the day before and told the governor, "You are doing nothing. You are offering up nothing. You said this was not predictable. This was totally predictable when you choose not to do anything." The confrontation received a mixed response from the crowd. Senator Ted Cruz told O'Rourke to "sit down" while Uvalde Mayor Don McLaughlin shouted at him and accused him of being a "sick son of a bitch" and making the tragedy a "political issue". O'Rourke left the room, escorted by security guards, and continued his remarks outside the building, criticizing Governor Abbott for not funding mental health services and for opposing gun regulations. The New York Times described the confrontation as a "political gamble" that received criticism from both Republicans and some Democrats.

O'Rourke has since shifted his views on guns and disavowed his comments on a mandatory assault rifle buyback program stating that he is "not interested in taking anything from anyone" and committed to "defending the second amendment".

=== Immigration ===
O'Rourke favors comprehensive immigration reform. As early as 2012, he asserted that his experience living on the border gave him "a strong understanding of immigration's impact on our community", calling El Paso "an Ellis Island to Latin America for more than 150 years", and spoke against 'militarizing' the border. O'Rourke opposed Trump's decision to end Deferred Action for Childhood Arrivals (DACA), which granted temporary stay to some undocumented immigrants who were brought to the United States as minors. O'Rourke said it is a "top priority" to protect DREAMers. In October 2016, he gave a TEDx talk, titled The Border Makes America Great, about his views on immigration.

He has criticized President Donald Trump's rhetoric on immigration, saying: "[Trump is] constantly stoking anxiety and fear about Mexicans, immigrants and the border with Mexico. Unfortunately this President takes another step into a dark world of fear, isolation and separation." In June 2018, O'Rourke led protests in Tornillo, Texas, against the Trump administration family separation policy which involved the separation of children of immigrant families. The city is located just miles from the Rio Grande, the river that creates the border of the United States and Mexico in the state of Texas. The Trump administration had created a "tent-city" in Tornillo, where separated children were being held without their parents. O'Rourke called this practice "un-American" and the responsibility of all Americans. O'Rourke stated that leading the march "was a religious experience... I happen to have been raised Catholic, and what I take away from my religion is you do your best to love everyone, to be good to everyone." In April 2019, O'Rourke publicly compared rhetoric used by Trump to describe immigrants to language from Nazi Germany.

Ted Cruz asserted in 2018 that O'Rourke wanted "open borders and wants to take our guns." PolitiFact found that Cruz's claims were "false", noting that O'Rourke had "not called for opening the borders or for government agents to take guns from law-abiding residents". Subsequently, in an interview in February 2019, O'Rourke indicated he would tear down the wall between El Paso and the southern US border, since he feels that the fencing has forced migrants to the most inhospitable areas of the southern border, "ensuring their suffering and death".

=== Religious liberty ===
In October 2019, during his presidential campaign, O'Rourke proposed to remove the tax-exempt status of religious organizations that oppose same-sex marriage. At CNN's Equality Town Hall, O'Rourke asserted that "'there can be no reward, no benefit, no tax break for anyone or any institution, any organization in America that denies the full human rights and the full civil rights of every single one of us'". O'Rourke's press secretary later clarified that he "'was referring to religious institutions who take discriminatory action'". O'Rourke's comment "infuriated a swath of religious and conservative leaders". Then presidential candidates Elizabeth Warren and Pete Buttigieg, who is gay, voiced disagreement and criticism of O'Rourke's stance.

=== Social issues ===
O'Rourke voted against the No Taxpayer Funding for Abortion Act. As a gubernatorial candidate, O'Rourke claims he would attempt to repeal Texas laws restricting abortion if he was elected governor.

O'Rourke told the Dallas Voice that "he called marriage equality a core civil rights issue" during his House primary campaign. While on the El Paso City Council, O'Rourke led a successful fight to overturn the domestic partnership ban. He was a co-sponsor of the Domestic Partnership Benefits and Obligations Act of 2013 (H.R. 3135).

Whilst previously having supported Medicare for All during the 2018 US Senate race, O'Rourke backtracked during the 2020 presidential primary, instead supporting a proposal he called "Medicare for America". This alternative would allow all citizens on an employment-based health insurance to keep that insurance if they wanted to, but it would move all uninsured, Medicaid-covered, and newborn citizens to Medicare immediately. He supports stabilization of the insurance markets to improve the Patient Protection and Affordable Care Act. He also supports the expansion of Medicaid and is a co-sponsor of the Medicare-X Choice Act of 2017.

O'Rourke has spoken out against racial inequality. He supports the football players who have taken part in the "Take a knee" protests. Speaking in a video that went viral, O'Rourke said he believes there is "nothing more American than to peacefully stand up, or take a knee, for your rights, anytime, anywhere or any place." He has also asserted that while he was given second chances after being arrested twice in his younger years, those chances are often "denied to too many of our fellow Texans, particularly those who don't look like me or have access to the same opportunities that I did." In September 2018, Cruz posted to Twitter a video of O'Rourke in a Dallas church, largely attended by African Americans, speaking out against the killing of Botham Shem Jean, an unarmed black man in his own home, by an off-duty police officer. In the video, the crowd gave the speech a standing ovation, and the video served to bolster O'Rourke's standing nationally, going viral and receiving wide praise.

=== Veterans ===
O'Rourke held monthly veterans town hall meetings throughout his term in Congress. After hearing about long wait times, especially regarding mental health, he carried out his own local survey of veterans, which showed wait times far exceeding what the VA was reporting. In an attempt to better meet veterans' needs, O'Rourke and others worked to establish a new program at the El Paso VA designed to care for military related health issues within the hospital while using community clinics or medical facilities in the area for more standard medical needs.

O'Rourke co-sponsored the bipartisan bill H.R. 1604, the Veterans' Mental Health Care Access Act, with Republican Congressmen Tom MacArthur, which expanded options for veterans seeking mental health care to non-VA facilities. O'Rourke serves on both the House Veterans' Affairs Committee, and the House Armed Services Committee, which oversees military installations such as Fort Bliss, headquartered in El Paso.

In September 2016, three bills that were attached as amendments to H.R. 5620 (or the VA Accountability First and Appeals Modernization Act of 2016) were approved unanimously with bipartisan support in the House. The first, the Vet Connect Act of 2016 (H.R. 5162), would allow a veteran's entire medical record to be shared with a community provider, without explicit written consent, with a pilot of the program then being tried in El Paso. The Ask Veterans Act (H.R. 1319) would have a non-government contractor conduct an annual survey on behalf of the secretary of Veterans Affairs in order to determine veterans' experiences with hospital care and medical services at VA facilities, the results of which would be publicly accessible. O'Rourke developed this idea from feedback from veterans at town hall meetings. The Get Vets a Doc Now Act (H.R. 5501) would allow the VA to provide conditional job offers to resident doctors two years before the completion of their programs, in an effort to recruit doctors to fill the shortage of 43,000 clinicians.

== Personal life ==
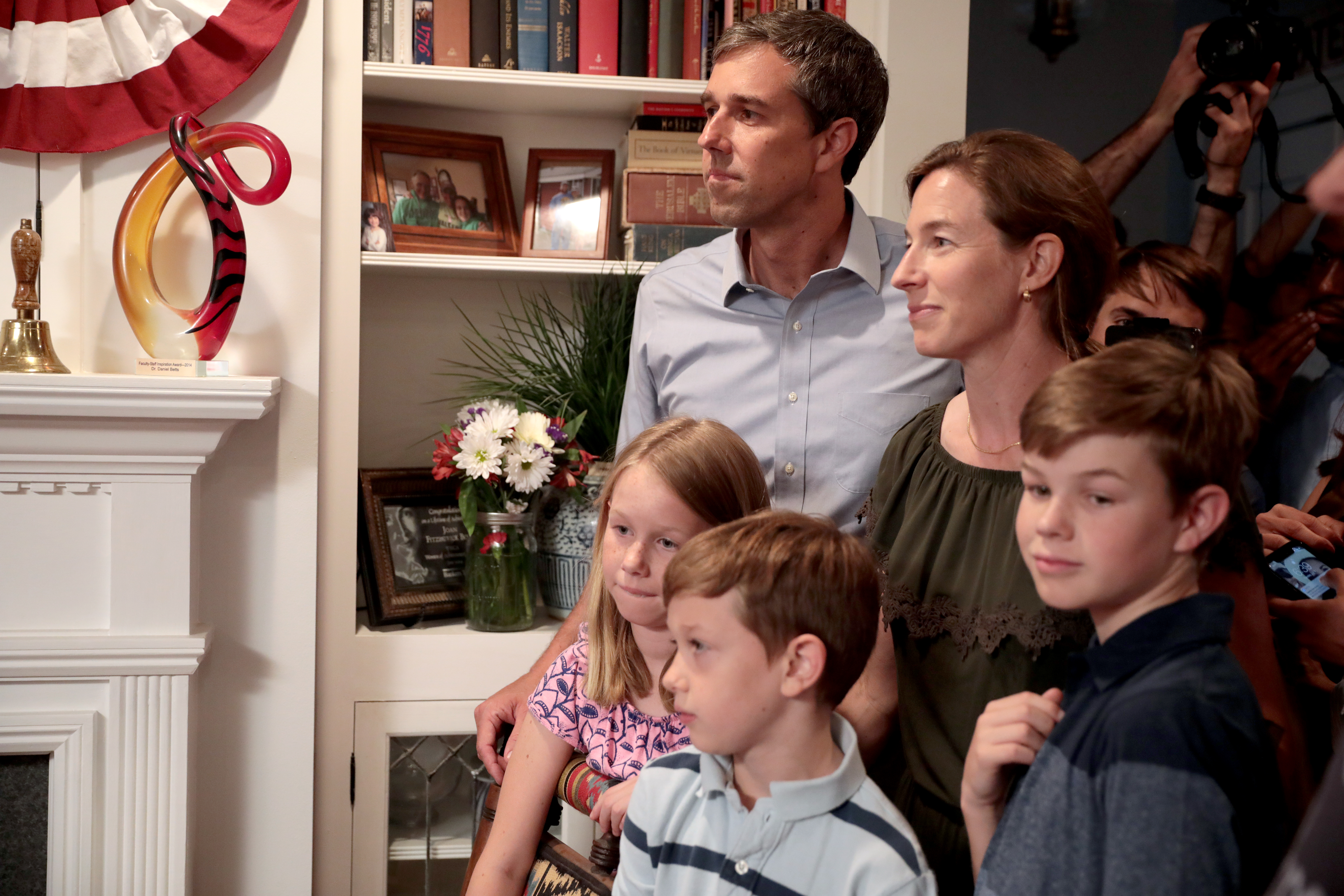
O'Rourke with his wife and children, 2019

On July 3, 2001, O'Rourke's father, a longtime cycling enthusiast, died while riding his bicycle along the shoulder of Pete Domenici Highway, just outside the city limits of El Paso and across the New Mexico state line, when he was struck from behind by a car, throwing him 70 feet (21 m) and causing severe head injuries; he was pronounced dead at the scene. O'Rourke delivered the eulogy during the funeral service at St. Patrick's Cathedral in El Paso. On December 20, 2022, O'Rourke's sister, Erin, died at the age of 42; she suffered from intellectual disabilities, and O'Rourke had been her legal guardian at one time. His mother died on December 17, 2023, from cancer.

O'Rourke married Amy Hoover Sanders, daughter of Louann and Bill Sanders, at her parents' ranch in Lamy, New Mexico, near Santa Fe, on September 24, 2005. Bill Sanders is a real estate developer who previously dated O'Rourke's mother and introduced her to O'Rourke's father. The couple and their three children live in El Paso's Sunset Heights in the Henry Trost-designed mission-style house where General Hugh Scott and Pancho Villa reportedly met in 1915.

O'Rourke is a lifelong Catholic, but has publicly expressed disagreement with Church doctrine, including its refusal to solemnize same-sex marriages.

=== Legal issues ===
On May 19, 1995, O'Rourke and his friends jumped over a fence at the University of Texas at El Paso (UTEP) physical plant and were arrested by the UTEP police. O'Rourke, then aged 24, was held in jail overnight and posted bail the following day. He was initially charged with attempted burglary, but prosecutors dropped the case in February 1996 when UTEP declined to pursue the charges.

O'Rourke was arrested for driving while intoxicated on September 27, 1998, at 3 a.m. on Interstate 10 in Anthony, Texas. The charges were dismissed in October 1999 after he completed a court-approved DWI program. In response to criticism from a political opponent in 2005, O'Rourke said, "I've been open about it since the very beginning. I have owned up to it, and I have taken responsibility for it." He apologized and said he was "grateful for the second chance".

== Electoral history ==
2012 United States House of Representatives elections in Texas: District 16
Party	Candidate	Votes	%
Democratic	Beto O'Rourke	101,403	65.42
Republican	Barbara Carrasco	51,043	32.93
Libertarian	Junart Sodoy	2,559	1.65
Total votes		155,005	100.00
Democratic hold			

2014 United States House of Representatives elections in Texas: District 16
Party	Candidate	Votes	%
Democratic	Beto O'Rourke (incumbent)	49,338	67.49
Republican	Corey Roen	21,324	29.17
Libertarian	Jaime Pérez	2,443	3.34
Total votes		73,105	100.00
Democratic hold			

2016 United States House of Representatives elections in Texas: District 16
Party	Candidate	Votes	%
Democratic	Beto O'Rourke (incumbent)	150,228	85.73
Libertarian	Jaime Pérez	17,491	9.98
Green	Mary Gourdoux	7,510	4.29
Total votes		175,229	100.00
Democratic hold			

2018 United States Senate election in Texas
Party	Candidate	Votes	%	±%
Republican	Ted Cruz (incumbent)	4,260,373	50.89%	−5.57%
Democratic	Beto O'Rourke	4,045,632	48.33%	+7.71%
Libertarian	Neal Dikeman	65,470	0.78%	−1.28%
Total votes		8,371,475	100%	N/A
Republican hold				

2022 Texas gubernatorial election
Party	Candidate	Votes	%	±%
Republican	Greg Abbott (incumbent)	4,437,099	54.76%	−1.05%
Democratic	Beto O'Rourke	3,553,656	43.86%	+1.35%
Libertarian	Mark Tippetts	81,932	1.01%	−0.68%
Green	Delilah Barrios	28,584	0.35%	N/A
Total votes		8,102,908	100.00%	N/A
Turnout		8,102,908	45.85%	
Registered electors		17,672,143		
Republican hold				

== Works ==
- O'Rourke, Beto (2023). We've Got to Try: How the Fight for Voting Rights Makes Everything Else Possible. Flatiron Books. ISBN 9781250852465.
- O'Rourke, Beto and Byrd, Susie (2011). Dealing Death and Drugs: The Big Business of Dope in the U.S. and Mexico. Cinco Puntos Press. ISBN 1933693940.

== See also ==
- Electoral history of Beto O'Rourke

== Sources ==
- Alexander, Dan (2019), "The Net Worth Of Every 2020 Presidential Candidate", Forbes, ISSN 0015-6914
- Long, Trish (2019), "Beto net worth: Personal finances disclosures indicate O'Rourke worth millions", El Paso Times, ISSN 0746-3588

U.S. House of Representatives
Preceded by Silvestre Reyes	Member of the U.S. House of Representatives from Texas's 16th congressional district 2013–2019	Succeeded by Veronica Escobar
Party political offices
Preceded by Paul Sadler	Democratic nominee for U.S. Senator from Texas (Class 1); 2018	Succeeded by Colin Allred
Preceded by Lupe Valdez	Democratic nominee for Governor of Texas; 2022	Succeeded by Gina Hinojosa
U.S. order of precedence (ceremonial)
Preceded by Craig Washington as Former U.S. Representative	Order of precedence of the United States as Former U.S. Representative	Succeeded by Will Hurd as Former U.S. Representative
