= Texas's 16th congressional district =

U.S. House district for Texas

Coordinates: 31°54′39″N 106°18′38″W

- Interactive map of district boundaries
- Representative: Veronica Escobar; D–El Paso
- Distribution: 98.36% urban; 1.64% rural
- Population (2025): 793,251
- Median household income: $62,019
- Ethnicity: 82.1% Hispanic; 11.7% White; 2.9% Black; 1.3% Asian; 1.2% Two or more races; 0.7% other
- Cook PVI: D+11

Texas's 16th congressional district of the United States House of Representatives includes almost all of El Paso and most of its suburbs in the state of Texas. The current Representative is Democrat Veronica Escobar.

The district was initially created in 1903. For most of the next six decades, it stretched across 42,000 square miles (110,000 km^{2}), from El Paso in the west to the Permian Basin (Midland and Odessa) in the east. However, after Texas' original 1960 district map was thrown out as a result of Wesberry v. Sanders, the 16th was shrunk down to the city of El Paso (except a sliver in the east) and most of its surrounding suburban communities.

Since the 1990s, the 16th has been the only Democratic bastion in heavily Republican West Texas. While it has been a majority-Hispanic district since the 1970s, only two Hispanics have ever represented it, Silvestre Reyes and Escobar.

== Recent election results from statewide races ==
=== 2023–2027 boundaries ===
Year	Office	Results
2008	President	Obama 65% - 34%
2012	President	Obama 66% - 34%
2014	Senate	Alameel 57% - 43%
2014	Governor	Davis 61% - 39%
2016	President	Clinton 68% - 26%
2018	Senate	O'Rourke 74% - 25%
2018	Governor	Valdez 67% - 32%
2018	Lt. Governor	Collier 68% - 29%
2018	Attorney General	Nelson 69% - 27%
2018	Comptroller of Public Accounts	Chevalier 66% - 27%
2020	President	Biden 67% - 32%
2020	Senate	Hegar 64% - 31%
2022	Governor	O'Rourke 64% - 35%
2022	Lt. Governor	Collier 61% - 35%
2022	Attorney General	Mercedes Garza 63% - 34%
2022	Comptroller of Public Accounts	Dudding 60% - 35%
2024	President	Harris 57% - 41%
2024	Senate	Allred 58% - 38%

=== 2027–2033 boundaries ===
Year	Office	Results
2008	President	Obama 66% - 34%
2012	President	Obama 66% - 34%
2014	Senate	Alameel 57% - 43%
2014	Governor	Davis 62% - 38%
2016	President	Clinton 68% - 26%
2018	Senate	O'Rourke 74% - 25%
2018	Governor	Valdez 67% - 31%
2018	Lt. Governor	Collier 68% - 29%
2018	Attorney General	Nelson 69% - 27%
2018	Comptroller of Public Accounts	Chevalier 67% - 27%
2020	President	Biden 67% - 31%
2020	Senate	Hegar 64% - 31%
2022	Governor	O'Rourke 64% - 35%
2022	Lt. Governor	Collier 61% - 35%
2022	Attorney General	Mercedes Garza 63% - 34%
2022	Comptroller of Public Accounts	Dudding 60% - 35%
2024	President	Harris 57% - 41%
2024	Senate	Allred 58% - 37%
2026	Senate	Talarico 72% - 24%
2026	Governor	Hinojosa 70% - 28%

== Composition ==
For the 118th and successive Congresses (based on redistricting following the 2020 census), the district contains all or portions of the following counties and communities:

El Paso County (9)

Anthony, Canutillo, El Paso (part; also 23rd), Fort Bliss (part; also 23rd), Horizon City (part; also 23rd), Prado Verde, Sparks, Socorro (part; also 23rd), Vinton, Westway

== List of members representing the district ==
Representative	Party	Years	Cong ess	Electoral history
District established March 4, 1903
William Robert Smith (Colorado)	Democratic	March 4, 1903 – March 3, 1917	58th 59th 60th 61st 62nd 63rd 64th	Elected in 1902. Re-elected in 1904. Re-elected in 1906. Re-elected in 1908. Re-elected in 1910. Re-elected in 1912. Re-elected in 1914. Lost renomination.
Thomas L. Blanton (Abilene)	Democratic	March 4, 1917 – March 3, 1919	65th	Elected in 1916. Redistricted to the 17th district.
Claude Hudspeth (El Paso)	Democratic	March 4, 1919 – March 3, 1931	66th 67th 68th 69th 70th 71st	Elected in 1918. Re-elected in 1920. Re-elected in 1922. Re-elected in 1924. Re-elected in 1926. Re-elected in 1928. Retired.
R. Ewing Thomason (El Paso)	Democratic	March 4, 1931 – July 31, 1947	72nd 73rd 74th 75th 76th 77th 78th 79th 80th	Elected in 1930. Re-elected in 1932. Re-elected in 1934. Re-elected in 1936. Re-elected in 1938. Re-elected in 1940. Re-elected in 1942. Re-elected in 1944. Re-elected in 1946. Resigned to become U.S. District Judge.
Vacant		July 31, 1947 – August 23, 1947	80th	
Kenneth M. Regan (Midland)	Democratic	August 23, 1947 – January 3, 1955	80th 81st 82nd 83rd	Elected to finish Thomason's term. Re-elected in 1948. Re-elected in 1950. Re-elected in 1952. Lost renomination.
J. T. Rutherford (Odessa)	Democratic	January 3, 1955 – January 3, 1963	84th 85th 86th 87th	Elected in 1954. Re-elected in 1956. Re-elected in 1958. Re-elected in 1960. Lost re-election.
Ed Foreman (Odessa)	Republican	January 3, 1963 – January 3, 1965	88th	Elected in 1962. Lost re-election.
Richard C. White (El Paso)	Democratic	January 3, 1965 – January 3, 1983	89th 90th 91st 92nd 93rd 94th 95th 96th 97th	Elected in 1964. Re-elected in 1966. Re-elected in 1968. Re-elected in 1970. Re-elected in 1972. Re-elected in 1974. Re-elected in 1976. Re-elected in 1978. Re-elected in 1980. Retired.
Ronald D. Coleman (El Paso)	Democratic	January 3, 1983 – January 3, 1997	98th 99th 100th 101st 102nd 103rd 104th	Elected in 1982. Re-elected in 1984. Re-elected in 1986. Re-elected in 1988. Re-elected in 1990. Re-elected in 1992. Re-elected in 1994. Retired.
Silvestre Reyes (El Paso)	Democratic	January 3, 1997 – January 3, 2013	105th 106th 107th 108th 109th 110th 111th 112th	Elected in 1996. Re-elected in 1998. Re-elected in 2000. Re-elected in 2002. Re-elected in 2004. Re-elected in 2006. Re-elected in 2008. Re-elected in 2010. Lost renomination.
Beto O'Rourke (El Paso)	Democratic	January 3, 2013 – January 3, 2019	113th 114th 115th	Elected in 2012. Re-elected in 2014. Re-elected in 2016. Retired to run for U.S. Senator.
Veronica Escobar (El Paso)	Democratic	January 3, 2019 – present	116th 117th 118th 119th	Elected in 2018. Re-elected in 2020. Re-elected in 2022. Re-elected in 2024. Re-elected in 2026.

== Recent elections ==
=== 2006 ===
2006 United States House of Representatives elections in Texas: District 16
Party	Candidate	Votes	%
Democratic	Silvestre Reyes (incumbent)	61,116	78.67
Libertarian	Gordon Strickland	16,572	21.33
Total votes		77,688	100.00
Democratic hold			

=== 2008 ===
2008 United States House of Representatives elections in Texas: District 16
Party	Candidate	Votes	%
Democratic	Silvestre Reyes (incumbent)	130,375	82.14
Independent	Ben Mendoza	16,348	10.30
Libertarian	Mette Baker	12,000	7.56
Total votes		158,723	100.00
Democratic hold			

=== 2010 ===
2010 United States House of Representatives elections in Texas: District 16
Party	Candidate	Votes	%
Democratic	Silvestre Reyes (incumbent)	49,301	58.08
Republican	Tim Besco	31,051	36.58
Libertarian	Bill Collins	4,319	5.09
Write-in		221	0.26
Total votes		84,892	100.00
Democratic hold			

=== 2012 ===
2012 United States House of Representatives elections in Texas: District 16
Party	Candidate	Votes	%
Democratic	Beto O'Rourke	101,403	65.42
Republican	Barbara Carrasco	51,043	32.93
Libertarian	Junart Sodoy	2,559	1.65
Total votes		155,005	100.00
Democratic hold			

=== 2014 ===
2014 United States House of Representatives elections in Texas: District 16
Party	Candidate	Votes	%
Democratic	Beto O'Rourke (incumbent)	49,338	67.49
Republican	Corey Roen	21,324	29.17
Libertarian	Jaime Pérez	2,443	3.34
Total votes		73,105	100.00
Democratic hold			

=== 2016 ===
2016 United States House of Representatives elections in Texas: District 16
Party	Candidate	Votes	%
Democratic	Beto O'Rourke (incumbent)	150,228	85.73
Libertarian	Jaime Pérez	17,491	9.98
Green	Mary Gourdoux	7,510	4.29
Total votes		175,229	100.00
Democratic hold			

=== 2018 ===
2018 United States House of Representatives elections in Texas: District 16
Party	Candidate	Votes	%
Democratic	Veronica Escobar	124,437	68.46
Republican	Rick Seeberger	49,127	27.03
Independent	Ben Mendoza	8,147	4.48
Total votes		181,754	100.00
Democratic hold			

=== 2020 ===
2020 United States House of Representatives elections in Texas: District 16
Party	Candidate	Votes	%
Democratic	Veronica Escobar (incumbent)	154,108	64.72
Republican	Irene Armendariz-Jackson	84,006	35.28
Total votes		238,114	100.00
Democratic hold			

=== 2022 ===
2022 United States House of Representatives elections in Texas: District 16
Party	Candidate	Votes	%
Democratic	Veronica Escobar (incumbent)	95,510	63.46
Republican	Irene Armendariz-Jackson	54,986	36.54
Total votes		150,496	100.0
Democratic hold			

=== 2024 ===
2024 United States House of Representatives elections in Texas: District 16
Party	Candidate	Votes	%
Democratic	Veronica Escobar (incumbent)	131,391	59.54
Republican	Irene Armendariz-Jackson	89,281	40.46
Total votes		220,672	100.0
Democratic hold			

== Historical district boundaries ==
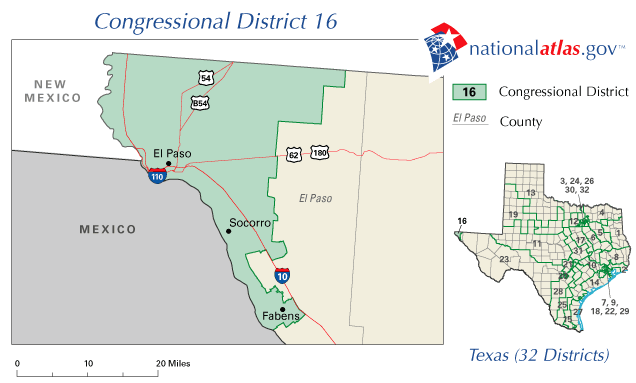
2007–2013

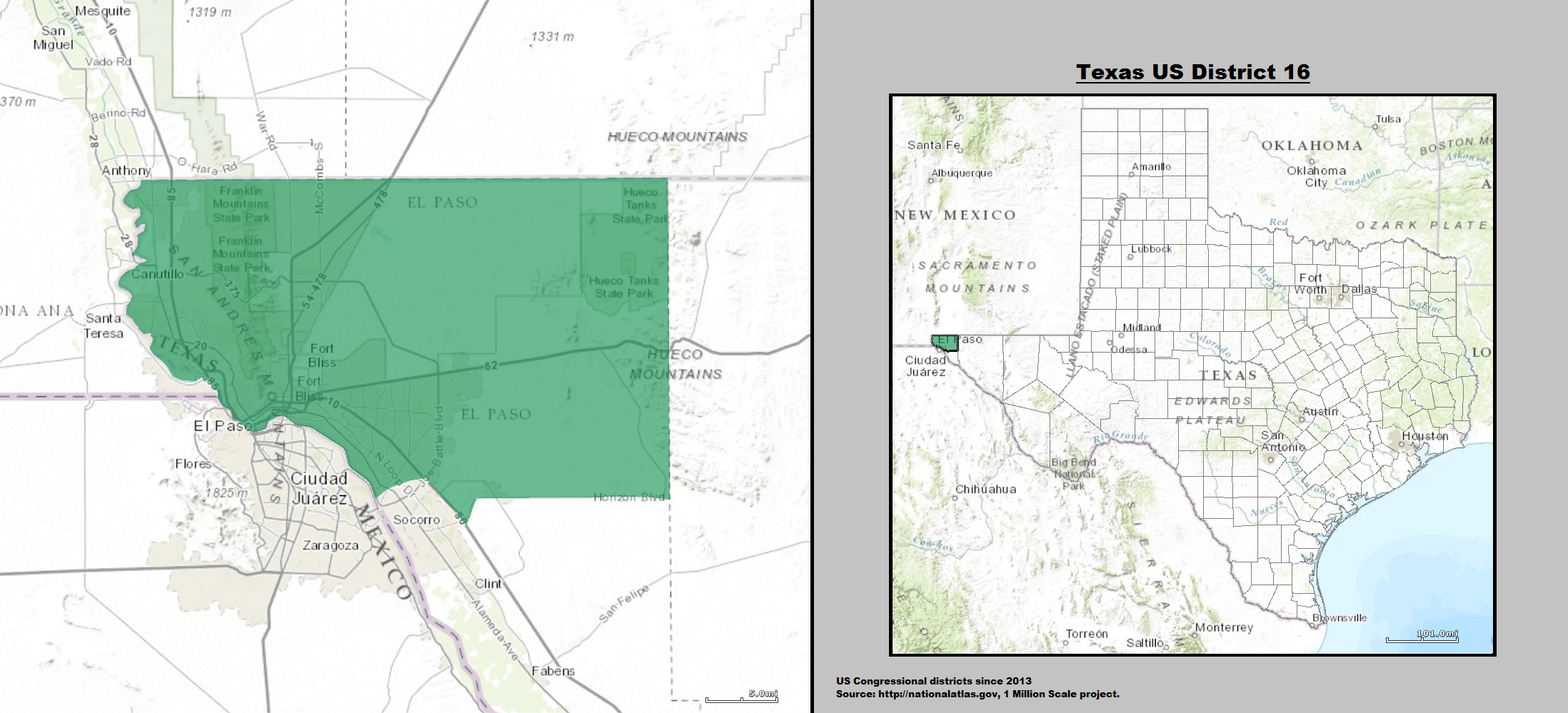
2013–2023

== See also ==
- List of United States congressional districts
