= Anthony Cobos =

American judge

El Paso County Judge
- In office 2007–2011
- Preceded by: Dolores Briones
- Succeeded by: Veronica Escobar

Member of the El Paso City Council District 8
- In office 2001–2005
- Preceded by: Elvia Hernandez
- Succeeded by: Beto O'Rourke

Personal details
- Born: El Paso, Texas, U.S.
- Party: Democratic

Anthony Cobos is an American politician from the State of Texas in the United States. He served as the El Paso County Judge from 2007 to 2011 and is a former member of the El Paso City Council. El Paso County, Texas, is located on the border of the United States and Mexico.

Cobos was investigated by the Federal Bureau of Investigation (FBI) as part of a public corruptions probe in 2007, was arrested by the FBI on December 16, 2011, charged with conspiracy to commit mail fraud, deprivation of honest services, and pleaded guilty to corruption charges on September 3, 2013. He was sentenced on January 3, 2014 to four years in federal prison, to be served in Colorado, and a $10,000 fine.

== Background ==
Cobos was born in El Paso, and raised on a farm near Anthony, New Mexico. He is married to Leticia Juarez Cobos and together they have five children. Cobos has been active in local politics for many years and owns several local businesses.

== City Council years ==
Cobos was elected to represent District 8 of the El Paso City Council in 2001 and re-elected to a second two-year term in 2003. Cobos was chosen by his colleagues on City Council to serve as Mayor Pro-Tempore (who serves as Mayor when the elected Mayor is out of town or otherwise unable to fulfill his or her duties). Cobos's second term on City Council was marked by his close relationship with Mayor Joe Wardy and his continued fight against the use of certificates of obligation for non-emergency uses.

Cobos's tenure on City Council was also notable for his very close association with the Bowling family, owner of Tropicana Homes. There was a general perception that Cobos frequently advanced the business interests of the Bowling family, even to the extent of actively undermining projects undertaken by rivals in the building industry, such as Ike Monte. Cobos was defeated by Beto O'Rourke in 2005.

== 2006 County Judge Election ==
In late 2005, Cobos began his campaign for El Paso County Judge. In Texas, the County Judge is an administrative, not a judicial, office. The County Judge serves as the presiding officer of the County Commissioners Court.

A lifelong Democrat, Cobos entered the Democratic primary with five challengers. The most prominent among them was Barbara Perez, a former El Paso County Commissioner and trustee of Socorro Independent School District in El Paso. No Republican candidates filed for election as County Judge, so the Democratic Primary would decide the next El Paso County Judge. The incumbent judge declined to run for re-election.

After a difficult primary election, it was determined that Cobos and Perez would face each other in a run-off election to determine the winner. Cobos won with 11,747 votes to Perez's 9,919 votes. Judge Cobos took office January 1, 2007. In an attempt to change perceptions about himself, Cobos announced to the El Paso Times, "This is a political rebirth for me. There is a big difference between where I am now and where I was three years ago. I will no longer be manipulated, blinded and influenced by special interests."

== Record as County Judge ==
In addition to allegations of public corruption, Cobos’s tenure as County Judge was marked by contention related to the County’s Ethics Board and an escalating conflict with County Commissioner Veronica Escobar.

Attorneys Theresa Caballero and Stuart Leeds filed suit on behalf of Cobos to prevent the County's Ethics Board from investigating an ethics complaint filed against him by El Paso City Representative Emma Acosta.

This complaint was later dismissed by the Ethics Board. With respect to Cobos's lawsuit, “[he] lost in court ... on every significant issue he and his lawyers raised” and the visiting judge dismissed the suit after concluding that Cobos and his lawyers sued the wrong party: the ethics board instead of the county. Cobos later withdrew the suit.

On January 17, 2010, Cobos accused Commissioner Veronica Escobar of “deprivation of honest services” in a criminal complaint filed with the El Paso Sheriff. The allegation concerned a vote by Escobar in 2007 to approve a settlement of a lawsuit against the County in which attorney John Wenke was representing the party suing the County. Cobos alleged that in 2010, Wenke's representation of Escobar in an ethics complaint filed against Escobar was payback for the vote three years before to approve the civil settlement. The ethics complaint against Escobar, filed by Theresa Caballero and Stuart Leeds, who had represented Cobos in his unsuccessful suit against the Ethics Board, was dismissed as “frivolous and without factual basis.”

On February 13, 2010, following a two-week investigation, Escobar was fully cleared of any criminal violations by the Sheriff’s Department. He came under fire for hiring a long-time controversial El Paso political activist Jaime O. Perez as his chief of staff. On December 11, 2008 Perez announced his resignation, effective in early 2009, and his intention to run for City Council against incumbent Steve Ortega, although Cobos the next day announced he would not accept Perez' resignation. Earlier in 2008 Perez asked County Attorney Jose Rodriguez for an opinion on whether a county judge can resign and still vote on their successor; Rodriguez affirmed that would be possible.

Cobos's previous chief of staff, Travis Ketner, pleaded guilty to several felonies and is considered a key source of information in the FBI corruption investigation. The charging document to which Ketner pleaded guilty indicated that Cobos hired Ketner at the urging of former El Paso County Judge and well-known political operative Luther Jones and that Ketner was hired for the explicit purpose of securing bribes for Cobos and others.

On December 12, 2008 Cobos held a news conference outside the offices of the El Paso Times to deny rumors he might resign as county judge, and to attack the newspaper for an editorial that wished he would resign. Cobos asked Times publisher and president Ray Stafford and editorial writers Joe Muench and Charles Edgren to debate him, which they did not do. He claimed that the Times is "attempting to break me" and "control my votes and actions on the Commissioners Court". Cobos attempted to enter the Times building, but was blocked by newspaper employees. He also banged on the building's glass doors, and eventually slipped a letter with his complaints through the slit between the doors. At the news conference Cobos also refused to answer questions about whether the rumors of his resignation might be related to Ketner's allegation and the FBI investigation, although he did state that he had not spoken to any federal agency in a year and a half.

== 2010 County Judge Election ==
Judge Cobos did not seek reelection in 2010. Some politicians rumored to be interested in replacing Cobos as county judge included City Council members Susie Byrd, Eddie Holguin, Steve Ortega, former county judge candidate Barbara Perez, Cobos's chief of staff Jaime Perez, and County Commissioners Veronica Escobar, Willie Gandara, and Dan Haggerty.

Sergio Coronado, who ran against Cobos in the 2006 primary, Larry Medina, a former City Council member and former County Commissioner, and Escobar ran in the Democratic primary. The Democratic primary was won by Escobar, and the Republican primary was won by Perez. Escobar defeated Perez and replaced Cobos as County Judge on January 1, 2011.

== FBI investigation ==
Judge Cobos was under investigation by the Federal Bureau of Investigation (FBI) for involvement in public corruption charges involving several high-profile citizens and organizations in El Paso. His office, along with the offices of two County Commissioners (Miguel Teran and Luis Sarinana) and the homes of Commissioner Teran and a member of the board of managers of R.E. Thomason Hospital (Arturo Duran), was searched by the FBI for evidence of crimes involving public corruption. Judge Cobos has denied any wrongdoing. Seven others, all part of the same investigation, have pleaded guilty to various charges. Cobos was arrested by the FBI on December 16, 2011 and charged with mail fraud, conspiracy to commit mail fraud, and deprivation of honest services.

On December 21, 2011 Cobos was released on $50,000 bond; his bond was not set on December 16 because he refused to answer pretrial questions. On January 20, 2012 several charges were dropped, with the charges of conspiracy to commit mail fraud and deprivation of honest services remaining. Federal court documents filed in August 2012, as part of the trial of Cirilo Madrid, indicate that Madrid bribed Cobos in December 2006 with envelopes of cash to receive Cobos's support for Madrid's company receiving a county contract to help mentally ill children.

Cobos pleaded guilty in September 2013 to receiving $4,500 bribes from lobbyists in exchange for his vote on county commissioner's court. He was sentenced in January 2014 to a $10,000 fine and four years in federal prison, to be served in Colorado. In December 2014 he requested his guilty plea and conviction be vacated because of alleged improper involvement in plea negotiations by the judge. Cobos's lawyers withdrew from representing him in January 2015 because he made this request without informing them.

== 2014 arrest ==
On January 30, 2014, Cobos was arrested on suspicion of fraud by the U.S. Marshals Service and Dona Ana County Sheriff's Office at his El Paso home for embezzling $43,000 from a couple in Las Cruces, New Mexico. He was convicted on January 13, 2016 and will face a maximum of nine years in prison.

Preceded By	El Paso County Judge	Followed By
Dolores Briones	Anthony Cobos	Veronica Escobar
1999–2007	2007–2011	2011-2017
