= Silvestre Reyes =

American politician (born 1944)

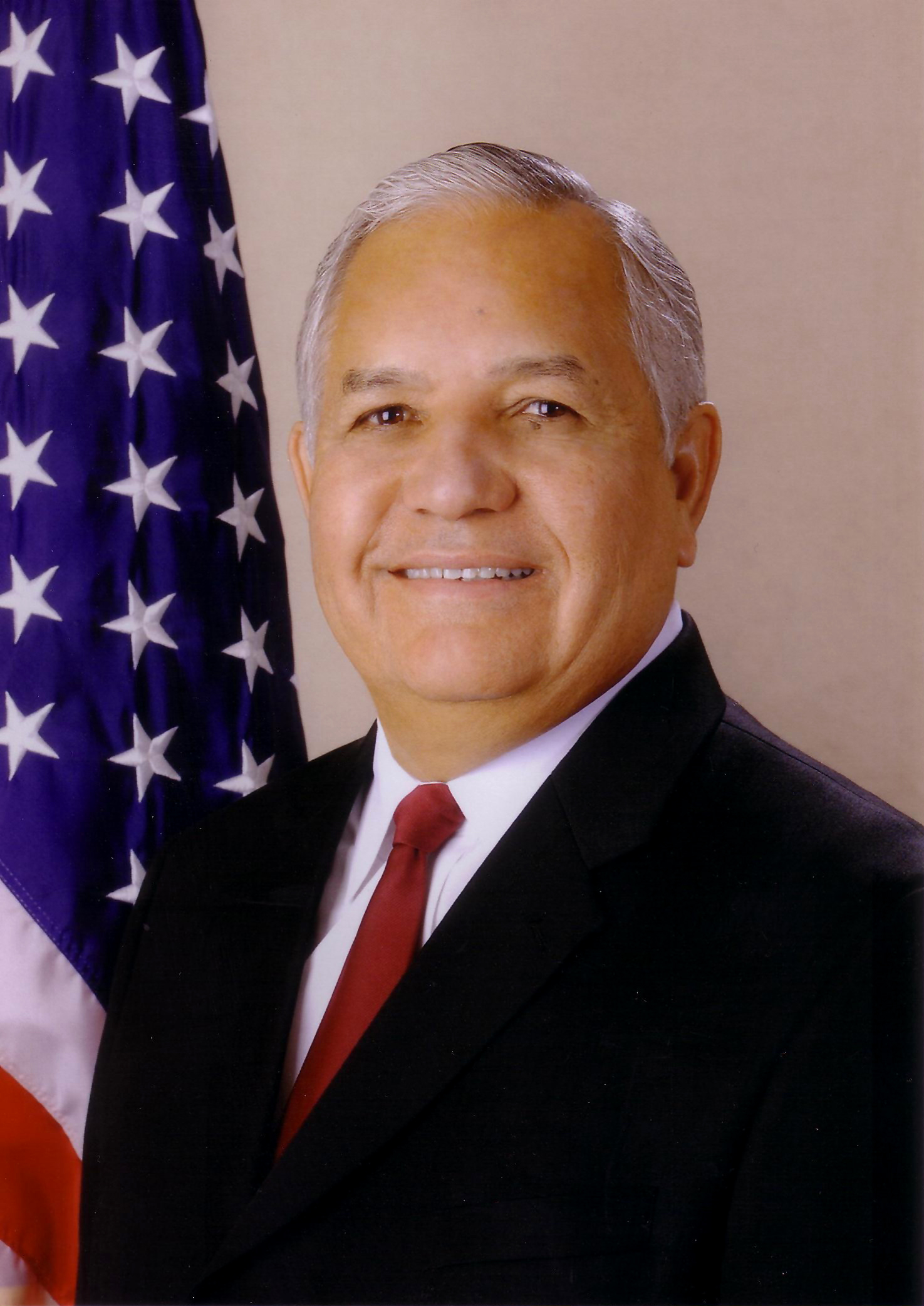

Chair of the House Intelligence Committee
- In office January 3, 2007 – January 3, 2011
- Preceded by: Pete Hoekstra
- Succeeded by: Mike Rogers

Member of the U.S. House of Representatives from Texas's 16th district
- In office January 3, 1997 – January 3, 2013
- Preceded by: Ron Coleman
- Succeeded by: Beto O'Rourke

Personal details
- Born: November 10, 1944 (age 82) Canutillo, Texas, U.S.
- Party: Democratic
- Spouse: Carolina Reyes
- Education: El Paso Community College (attended); University of Texas, Austin (attended)

Military service
- Branch/service: United States Army
- Years of service: 1966–1968
- Rank: Sergeant
- Battles/wars: Vietnam War
- Awards: Air Medal
- Reyes's voice Reyes on the FY2005 National Defense Authorization Act. Recorded May 19, 2004

Silvestre "Silver" Reyes (born November 10, 1944) is an American politician who was the U.S. representative for Texas's 16th congressional district, serving from 1997 to 2013. A member of the Democratic Party, he was Chairman of the House Permanent Select Committee on Intelligence between 2007 and 2011. In the Democratic primary election on May 29, 2012, Reyes lost by a margin wide enough to avert a runoff election to former El Paso city councilman Beto O'Rourke.

In 2008, Reyes served as the Southwest co-chairman for Hillary Clinton's presidential campaign along with Congresswoman Sheila Jackson Lee. Then U.S. Senator Clinton praised Reyes saying he was "one of our wisest and most experienced leaders on national security and the particular issues that affect Americans living along the border and throughout the Southwest. I am proud to have his support and grateful for his advice."

== Early life, education, and career ==
Reyes was born in Canutillo, an unincorporated suburban community west of El Paso, and is the oldest of 10 children. He graduated from Canutillo High School and received his associate degree from El Paso Community College. He attended the University of Texas at Austin before serving in the United States Army in 1966. In 1967, Reyes served as a helicopter crew chief in the Vietnam War. In 1968, Reyes suffered complete hearing loss to his right ear when mortar landed near his foxhole during combat.

In 1969, Reyes joined the U.S. Border Patrol where he served for over 26 years. From 1984 - 1995 Reyes served as the Sector Chief for the McAllen and El Paso Sectors of the Border Patrol. In 1993, while serving as the Chief Patrol Agent of the El Paso Border Patrol Sector, Reyes led the Border Patrol to strategically position agents on the border to intercept illegal immigrants in a strategy later termed "Operation Hold the Line". This operation was the predecessor to a similar operation dubbed "Operation Gatekeeper" in Southern California. Such tactics were not without controversy, as placing Border Patrol Agents in high visibility positions placed them at tremendous risk from rock and firearms assaults from the Mexican side of the border. Immigrant-rights groups also protested the strategy, as it was effective in deterring illegal immigrants from crossing in protected urban areas such as El Paso and San Diego, California, and as such forced them to cross through desolate and more dangerous parts of the Southwestern United States, such as the deserts of the Imperial Valley in California and the Sonora desert in Arizona. Reyes gained enormous popularity in the 16th Congressional District due to the Operation's success, along with other factors, in reducing illegal immigration.

== U.S. House of Representatives ==
As a senior member of both the Armed Services and (formerly) Select Intelligence Committees, Reyes was a key player in developing military and defense policy. He is credited with the recent success of Fort Bliss and White Sands military bases in the most recent Base Realignment and Closure (BRAC) decisions by the Department of Defense. On December 1, 2006, Reyes was tapped by Pelosi, the prospective Speaker of the House, to be the new chairman of the House Intelligence Committee.

Reyes was a key player in the 109th Congress because of his Immigration and Border Patrol experience. He was instrumental in leading the opposition to the House immigration proposal proposed by James Sensenbrenner, H.R. 4437. Congresswoman Nancy Pelosi selected Reyes to present and lead the debate on a Democratic substitute to replace the Sensenbrenner legislation, which was voted down on a party line vote.

Reyes has served as chairman of the Congressional Hispanic Caucus. In 2002, he considered running for the United States Senate, but decided against such a move. In 2005 he missed 94 votes in the House, the ninth most of any member.

On March 27, 2009, Reyes was tapped by Speaker of the House Nancy Pelosi to lead a high-level Congressional Delegation to meet with President Felipe Calderón of Mexico. Reyes led the delegation and was accompanied by Ike Skelton, Chairman of the House Armed Services Committee, and Howard Berman, Chairman of the House Foreign Affairs Committee. The three high-ranking Chairman discussed Mexico's efforts to combat drug-related violence and assessed U.S. efforts to assist the Mexican government.

In his role as Chairman of the House Intelligence Committee, Reyes was a deciding factor in whether legislation on the floor of the House extending provisions of the FISA would include retroactive immunity for telecommunications companies which participated in the NSA's warrantless wiretap program. Although he initially supported immunity for telecommunications companies, saying that immunity was necessary and the companies hadn't done anything illegal, eventually after being contacted by pressure groups, the version of the legislation he introduced did not contain provisions for telecom immunity, despite Republican threats to torpedo any bill that did not contain telecom immunity.

In the same interview, Reyes said that he favored sending more troops to Iraq: "on a temporary basis, I'm willing to ramp them up by twenty or thirty thousand ... for, I don't know, two months, four months, six months – but certainly that would be an exception." Yet, a month later, when President George W. Bush proposed sending approximately 21,500 more troops, Reyes said to the El Paso Times, "we don't have the capability to escalate even to this minimal level."

=== Committee assignments ===
- Committee on Armed Services
  - Subcommittee on Tactical Air and Land Forces (Ranking Member)
  - Subcommittee on Readiness
- Permanent Select Committee on Intelligence (Chair)

=== Caucus memberships ===
- Congressional Arts Caucus
- Congressional Hispanic Caucus (Chair)

=== Awards ===
In 2006, Reyes was selected as the "El Pasoan of the Year" by the El Paso, Inc. for his successful efforts in Congress to expand the role and mission of Fort Bliss. He also was the recipient of the League of United Latin American Citizens "Lucy G. Acosta Humanitarian Award," and the U.S. Hispanic Chamber of Commerce "President's Lifetime Achievement Award."

In 2008, the Association of the United States Army (AUSA) presented Reyes with the "Outstanding Legislator Award," calling him a "great [friend] of the Army as an institution and [supporter] of soldiers and their families." Reyes established the Congressional USO (United Service Organizations) Caucus. That same year ASME honored Reyes with the ASME President's Award on April 3, 2008. ASME President Sam Zamrik presented the award in recognition of Reyes' "outstanding contributions in promoting diversity in the science, technology, engineering, and math fields" as the co-founder of the Congressional Diversity and Innovation Caucus.

The Frontera Land Alliance presented Reyes with the organization's "Rock Award" in 2010 for his efforts to preserve Castner Range in Northeast El Paso for conservation purposes. As a senior Member of the House Armed Services Committee, Reyes worked to transfer ownership of Castner Range from the Department of Defense to preserve the 7,000-acres of undeveloped desert, foothills, and mountains in Northeast El Paso.

In 2012, the Minority Business Development Agency presented Reyes with their Venable Legacy Award for Lifetime Achievement ABE during their National Minority Enterprise Week Conference.

The Congressional Hispanic Caucus Institute honored Reyes, known on the Hill for his humor, by naming their annual stand-up comedy event the "Reyes of Comedy" in 2000. The event seeks to promote a positive image of Latinos, while raising critical funds for CHCI's programs that empower Latino youth through educational attainment and leadership development programs. In 2013, the Institute chose Reyes as the inaugural inductee into the Reyes of Comedy Hall of fame.

On October 29, 2012 the Canutillo Independent School District Board of Trustees voted unanimously to name a school after Reyes and his wife Carolina. The school which is to be open by the 2014-15 school year will serve students in grades pre-kindergarten through eighth.

== Political campaigns ==
In 1995, Reyes retired from the U.S. Border Patrol and announced his candidacy for the U.S. Congress against Ron Coleman in the Democratic primary, but Coleman later retired. Reyes finished first in a five-way Democratic primary—the real contest in this heavily Democratic district. He then defeated Jose Luis Sanchez in the runoff by just over 1,000 votes. He won the general election with little trouble, taking 70 percent of the vote. Although the 16th has long since become a Latino-majority district, Reyes was the first Latino to represent the district.

He was reelected seven times with no substantive Republican opposition. He only faced a Libertarian challenger in 1998 and 2008, and was completely unopposed in 2000.

In 2012, Reyes lost the Democratic primary to former El Paso City Council member Beto O'Rourke, taking 44.4 percent of the vote—just a few hundred votes short of forcing a runoff. Reyes' campaign received endorsements from incumbent President Barack Obama and former President Bill Clinton, with the latter appearing at a rally for him.

== See also ==
- List of Hispanic and Latino Americans in the United States Congress

U.S. House of Representatives
Preceded by Ron Coleman	Member of the U.S. House of Representatives from Texas's 16th congressional district 1997–2013	Succeeded by Beto O'Rourke
Preceded by Lucille Roybal-Allard	Chair of the Congressional Hispanic Caucus; 2001–2003	Succeeded by Ciro Rodriguez
Preceded by Pete Hoekstra	Chair of the House Intelligence Committee; 2007–2011	Succeeded by Mike Rogers
U.S. order of precedence (ceremonial)
Preceded by Jack Fields as Former U.S. Representative	Order of precedence of the United States as Former U.S. Representative	Succeeded by Jeb Hensarling as Former U.S. Representative
