= County judge =

Person who presides over a county court

The term county judge is applied as a descriptor, sometimes as a title, for a person who presides over a county court. In most cases, such as in Northern Ireland and the Victorian County Courts, a county judge is a judicial officer with civil or criminal jurisdiction. In the United States, however, there are some county courts which exercise primarily administrative functions, in which case the county judge may exercise largely or solely executive authority and be equivalent to the county executive in other local government areas.

== United States ==
County court systems are common in the United States, often led by a county judge, but with jurisdiction varying between the states, and in many cases carry a mix of administrative law functions and executive responsibilities for governing the county. In Missouri, for example, the county court deals largely with property registration and deeds as well as leading the county – in 1922, Harry S. Truman was elected as one of two county judges for Jackson County, Missouri, becoming the county presiding judge in 1926, his two elected positions prior to entering the United States Senate. In states like New York, Massachusetts, and Pennsylvania, the County Courts conduct trials on misdemeanor, and even some felony, i. e. criminal matters.

The blurring of executive and judicial functions has developed on a state-by-state basis in response to local needs and so there is little uniformity between states, and even within states at times (differing interactions of rural and urban or municipal jurisdictions with each other and with the state government, for example). Tennessee and Oregon both have county courts which are executive agencies, and which thus carry responsibility for funding local courts, jails, and sheriff's departments, maintaining county roads, managing local property developments, and levying county-wide property taxes. In other areas, this body is often called a county commission.

In Kentucky, each county has the similarly titled elected office of county judge/executive, who serves as the chief executive officer for the vast majority of counties. Arkansas counties are likewise headed by an elected county judge, who exercises executive power and presides over the county legislature, known as the quorum court.

=== Texas ===
In Texas, the county judge is essentially the chief executive officer in the county. County judges preside over the county's commissioners court, which is the county's governing body; they do not preside over a judicial court. It is similar to the position of county executive in other US states. Many counties in Texas have county administrators but they primarily act in a treasurer role.

In Texas, the county courts have original jurisdiction established under sections 15 to 17 of Article V of the state constitution. Each of Texas's 254 counties has a single county court, which shall be a "court of record" (section 15) with "jurisdiction as provided by law" (section 16), which is exclusive over "Class A" and "Class B" misdemeanors (offenses that can involve jail time), concurrent over civil cases concerning small to moderate amounts, and with appellate jurisdiction over justice of the peace and district / municipal court cases (involving a trial de novo if the lower court is not a "court of record"). An elected county judge shall preside over the county court for a four-year term (section 15) and have "judicial functions as provided by law," who may be replaced in cases of judicial disqualification or recusal (section 16). Juries in criminal trials "shall consist of six persons; but no jury shall be empaneled to try a civil case unless demanded by one of the parties, who shall pay such jury fee therefor, in advance, as may be prescribed by law, unless the party makes affidavit that the party is unable to pay the jury fee" (section 17).

Since the jurisdiction of county courts and the judicial functions of the county judge are both limited "by law" their extent is defined by legislative actions. County judges do not require any formal qualifications in the discipline of law. Most are not qualified to practice law – in 2015, 42 county judges (17%) had graduated from Law school and only 40 (16%) were licensed to practice law. This can be problematic, but with a caseload well beyond the capabilities of a single person, the Texas Legislature has created county courts-at-law where only qualified lawyers may preside, to which many of the judicial responsibilities of the county judge have been transferred. Individual counties are free to strip the county judge of all judicial responsibilities, but this has not occurred in most places; county judges undertaking judicial activities draw a supplemental salary, and in 2011 the Houston Chronicle reported that 85% of counties had judges drawing this stipend. The judicial education officer at the Texas Association of Counties, David Hodges, has noted that the rate of cases being overturned is higher for both the county courts-at-law and for district court judges than it is for county judges. Some county judges view the county courts-at-law as supplements to, rather than replacements of, the county court's judicial functions and so choose to preside in some criminal matters.

==== County commissioners' court ====
Each Texas county is presided over by a commissioners' court of four county commissioners and the County Judge, plus the county clerk as a non-voting ex officio member. Despite the terms "court" and "judge," county commissioners' courts have no judicial function, and although county judges preside over their meetings, county judges does not render judicial rulings. The commissioners court is just the title given in Texas to the county government, and county judge the title given to the head of county government. This body is responsible for administration of the county, controlling the county tax rate, the budget for its responsible departments, and exercising oversight over subsidiary boards and commissions. The County Judge presides over meetings but has no veto power, Reviews and the court makes decisions by simply majority and is quorate with three voting members (except for levying tax where four members are required). Consequently, a county judge is primarily the chief administrator for the county, effectively the chief executive officer, who exercises only limited judicial functions (varying between counties), though retaining the authority to conduct marriages and to conduct administrative hearings.
