= List of University of Texas at El Paso people =

This list of UTEP people includes graduates, non-graduate former students, and current students of University of Texas at El Paso and its graduate programs.

== Academia and research ==
- Alicia Cuarón – educator and human rights activist
- Howard Dorgan – academic and researcher
- Eleanor Lyon Duke – biology professor
- Norma Hernández – educator; former dean of education at UTEP
- Yuri Herrera – educator, writer, editor, and professor at Tulane University
- William Turrentine Jackson – historian and professor
- Howard McCord – English professor
- George McLendon – Former Provost of Rice University
- Charles A. O'Reilly III – academic and professor
- Anna Panorska – professor and statistician
- Julio E. Rubio – researcher and administrator at Monterrey Institute of Technology and Higher Education
- Edward F. Sherman – legal scholar; former dean of Tulane University Law School
- Robert Stevenson – musicologist, educator, and professor.
- Josefina Villamil Tinajero – educator, professor and former president of National Association for Bilingual Education

== Activism, civil rights, and social justice ==
- Martha P. Cotera – librarian, writer, and Chicana feminist activist
- Evdokia Romanova – activist for sexual and reproductive health and rights and LGBTQ rights; prosecuted under Russian anti-LGBTQ law
- Hector E. Sanchez – labor leader; CEO of Mi Familia Vota and former director of Planned Parenthood
- María Guillermina Valdes Villalva – Chicana scholar and activist; pioneer in border studies
- Kimie Yanagawa – first Japanese person to be naturalized as a U.S. citizen following the restrictive 1922 Supreme Court ruling Ozawa v. United States

== Art and design ==
- Manuel Gregorio Acosta – painter, muralist, sculptor and illustrator; known for his portrait of César Chávez that appeared on the cover of Time magazine in 1969
- Lamberto Alvarez – artist
- Ho Baron – sculptor
- José Antonio Burciaga – artist and muralist
- Gaspar Enriquez – Chicano painter and portraitist
- Rosa Ramirez Guerrero – educator, artist, and historian
- Elisa Jimenez – fashion designer and interdisciplinary artist
- Luis Jiménez – sculptor
- Catherine B. Kistenmacher – artist; administrator for International Museum of Art
- Monica Aissa Martinez – visual artist
- Troy Montes-Michie – painter and collage artist
- Maria Almeida Natividad – artist and educator
- Mago Orona Gándara – mural artist
- Dave Ortega – artist
- Beverly Penn – sculptor
- Tomas Vu – painter, printmaker, and installation artist

== Business, entrepreneurship, and philanthropy ==
- Eric Hilton – hotelier and philanthropist; former vice chairman of Hilton Hotels and heir in the Hilton family
- Vickie Guerrero – general manager of WWE Smackdown
- Yossi Maiman – president of Ampal-American Israel Corporation
- John Kimble – founder of multiple agencies later acquired by William Morris Agency
- Bob O'Rear – former director of international sales and marketing at Microsoft and one of the earliest employees
- Angelica Rosales – business executive and activist

== Entertainment ==
- F. Murray Abraham – Academy Award Best Actor winner, Amadeus
- Ana Alicia – actress
- Susan Blakely – actress and former model, known for Rich Man, Poor Man, for which she received a Golden Globe Award for Best Actress
- Ara Celi – actress
- Jessica Drake – adult actress, director, and sex educator
- Georgina Escobar – playwright and director
- Cristina Eustace – singer
- Alana de la Garzab– actress
- Jack Handey – humorist, Saturday Night Live
- Mia Khalifa – former adult actress, social media personality, webcam model
- Karla Martinez – host of popular morning show Despierta America
- Sonny Melendrez – TV and radio personality
- David Miner – musician; founding member of The Great Society (band)
- Ted Quillin – radio personality
- Joe Reisman – musician, bandleader, and record producer in the swing era.
- Esmi Talamantez – singer
- Adrián Terrazas-González – instrumentalist; former member of The Mars Volta
- Randy Van Horne – singer and musician

== Government, law, public policy, and military ==
- Juan G. Ayala – Major general, USMC, ret.; commanded the Marine Corps Installations Command
- Suzie Azar – 43rd Mayor of El Paso; first woman mayor of El Paso
- Anthony Bernal – White House aide; Chief of Staff to the First Lady of the United States
- Cesar Blanco – member of the Texas Senate
- James F. Bockelman – former Florida House of Representatives member
- Cyndi Carrasco – member of Indiana Senate
- Ron Coleman – former U.S. House of Representatives member
- Veronica Escobar – U.S. Representative for Texas and former Co-Chair of the House Democratic Policy and Communications Committee
- John Cook – 49th Mayor of El Paso
- Yoram Ettinger – Israeli diplomat and consultant on U.S.–Israel relations
- Art Fierro – former Texas House of Representatives member
- Maria-Elena Giner – former U.S. Commissioner of the International Boundary and Water Commission
- Alden G. Glauch – Major general, USAF, ret.; commanded the Twenty-First Air Force
- Carrie Hamblen – member of the New Mexico Senate
- Idris Haron – former Chief Minister of Malacca, Malaysia
- William D. Hawkins – U.S. Marine awarded the Medal of Honor posthumously during World War II
- Homer Heck – former member of the West Virginia Senate
- Randy Hunt – former Massachusetts House of Representatives member
- Suzanna Hupp – former Republican state representative and gun rights advocate
- Renard Johnson – 53rd Mayor of El Paso
- Shoshana Johnson – U.S. Army former Prisoner of war (POW) in the Iraq War
- M. Sue Kurita – judge
- Philip Ray Martinez – former U.S. district judge
- Susana Martinez – 31st Governor of New Mexico; first female hispanic governor in U.S.
- Victor Mendez – former Administrator of the Federal Highway Administration; former U.S. Deputy Secretary of Transportation
- Gabriel Moreno – member of the Maryland House of Delegates
- Paul Moreno – former Texas state representative, longest serving Mexican American elected official in the U.S.
- Pat O'Rourke – former judge
- Claudia Ordaz Perez – member of the Texas House of Representatives
- Evelina Ortega – former member of the Texas House of Representatives
- Ray Salazar – 40th Mayor of El Paso
- Ralph Scoggins – former member of the Texas House of Representatives
- Venetta Seals – former Mayor of Pecos, Texas
- Pete Snelson – former member of the Texas House of Representatives and Texas Senate
- Margaret Strickland – judge
- Richard Crawford White – former member Texas House of Representatives and U.S. House of Representative
- Nora Yú – Mexican politician; former member of the Chamber of Deputies

== Literature and journalism ==
- Juan Álvarez – writer
- Estela Casas – journalist and news anchor
- Khendum Choden – poet and author
- Alfredo Corchado – journalist and author
- John Corcoran – author and literacy advocate
- David Cruz – writer, poet and journalist
- Sam Donaldson – ABC News veteran and former White House Chief Correspondent
- Monica Garcia – local news anchor
- Alicia Gaspar de Alba – writer, scholar, novelist, and poet
- Betina González – writer
- Edna Gundersen – journalist, writer and music critic for USA Today
- Sheryl Luna – writer and poet; inaugural winner of the Andrés Montoya Poetry Prize
- Estela Portillo-Trambley – poet
- Lupe Mendez – poet, educator, and literary arts organizer
- Rubén Salazar – Mexican-American journalist
- John Rechy – LGBTQ themed novelist and essayist
- Verónica Reyes – LGBTQ poet
- Benjamin Alire Sáenz – poet, novelist and author of children's books
- Tatiana de la Tierra – poet, writer, and founder of Esto no tiene nombre (magazine)
- Sylvia Aguilar Zéleny – novelist, short story writer, and educator
- Dale L. Walker – writer, historian and former president of Western Writers of America (WWA)
- Janice Woods Windle – author and novelist

== Religion ==
- James M. Adams Jr. – former Bishop of Western Kansas
- Joel Neftali Martinez – bishop of the United Methodist Church

== Science, technology, medicine, and engineering ==
- Martha E. Bernal – psychologist; first Latina to earn a PhD in psychology in the U.S.
- John D. Boice Jr. – radiation epidemiologist
- Chuck Easttom – computer scientist specializing in cryptography and engineering
- Willarda V. Edwards – physician; former president of the National Medical Association and Sickle Cell Disease Association of America
- Edith Eger – clinical psychologist, Holocaust survivor, and author who specialized in post-traumatic stress disorder
- Lauren Esposito – arachnologist; chair of Arachnology at the California Academy of Sciences and co-founder of 500 Queer Scientists
- Ann Gates – computer scientist and researcher
- Roger V. Gonzalez – mechanical and biomedical engineer; educator
- Ginger Kerrick – physicist and first Hispanic female NASA Flight Director at NASA's Lyndon B. Johnson Space Center
- Luke Mays – aerospace engineer and commercial astronaut; former director of payload operations on the International Space Station (ISS) at NASA Marshall Space Flight Center
- Artie L. Metcalf – malacologist
- John D. Olivas – first UTEP alumnus to be selected as an astronaut by NASA, member of Space Shuttle Mission STS-117 crew aboard the Atlantis
- Brisa Sánchez – biostatistician; environmental epidemiologist
- Catherine Snelson – geophysicist
- Charles A. Steen – geologist whose Mi Vida Mine discovery started the American Uranium Boom of the 1950s

== Sports ==
=== Administrative ===
- Lisa Campos – athletic director of University of Texas at San Antonio (UTSA)
- Charmaine Crooks – sports executive, Olympic silver medalist and five-time Olympian; former 36th president of the Canadian Soccer Association
- Ed Hochuli – NFL referee; attorney

=== Baseball ===
- Mike Maddux – Major League Baseball coach and former pitcher

=== Basketball ===
- Nate Archibald – NBA Hall of Famer, chosen as one of the Top 50 Greatest NBA Players
- Jane Asinde – basketball player; CUSA Newcomer of the Year & Freshman of the Year
- George Balanis – former college basketball coach at William & Mary
- David Livingston Carrasco – former basketball coach; first Mexican American head coach at a major U.S. university
- Dave Feitl – former NBA player
- Taurian Fontenette – streetball player for AND1 Live Tour during early 2000s
- Greg Foster – former NBA player and one time NBA champion with the Los Angeles Lakers
- Tim Hardaway – NBA All-Star, 2000 Summer Olympics gold medalist
- McKenzie Moore – player in the Israeli Basketball Premier League
- Nolan Richardson – former NCAA champion collegiate men's basketball head coach at the University of Arkansas
- Tamara Seda – basketball player
- Kayla Thornton – forward for the Dallas Wings
- Kimani Young – associate head coach for the UConn Huskies men's basketball team

=== Combat Sports ===
- Dan Evensen – mixed martial artist; former UFC heavyweight
- Tevita Fifita – professional wrestler; former WWE Tag Team Champion
- Héctor Guerrero – former professional wrestler; performed on WWF and NWA
- Mando Guerrero – former professional wrestler
- Blackjack Mulligan – professional wrestler; WWE Hall of Fame (Class of 2006) as a member of The Blackjacks

=== Football ===
- Fred Carr – Green Bay Packers Hall of Fame linebacker
- Jon Dorenbos – Buffalo Bills, Philadelphia Eagles former long snapper
- Wayne Hansen – former NFL player
- Johnnie Lee Higgins – National Football League wide receiver and return specialist, Conference USA Special Teams Player of the Year in 2006
- Ed Hochuli – National Football League referee; officiated Super Bowls XXXII and XXXVIII
- Thomas Howard – former NFL linebacker
- Chuck Hughes – NFL receiver; died after suffering heart attack during 1971 game while playing for the Detroit Lions vs. the Chicago Bears
- Chris Jacke – BBA 1989, All-American place kicker, Super Bowl champion with Green Bay Packers
- Aaron Jones – Minnesota Vikings running back
- Seth Joyner – named 1991 NFL Defensive Player of the Year by Sports Illustrated, one-time Super Bowl champion
- Riley Matheson – former NFL player
- Don Maynard – Pro Football Hall of Fame
- Halakilangi Muagututia – American football player
- Brian Natkin – former NFL tight end and unanimous college All-American
- Jordan Palmer – former NFL quarterback
- John Rayborn – gridiron football player
- Paul Smith – former NFL fullback
- Billy Stevens – former Green Bay Packers quarterback
- Tony Tolbert – three-time world champion with the Dallas Cowboys
- Bob Wallace – former Chicago Bears tight end
- Marvin Washington – former NFL player
- Charlie West – former NFL player
- Jesse Whittenton – former NFL player, in Green Bay Packers Hall of Fame
- Barron Wortham – former NFL player
- Brian Young – former NFL player

=== Golf ===
- Chris Baryla – professional golfer
- J. P. Hayes – professional golfer
- Fred Hawkins (golfer) – one-time PGA tour winner
- Ryan Hietala – professional golfer
- Gerina Piller – professional women's golfer
- Roger Sloan – professional golfer
- Paul Stankowski – two-time winner on the PGA Tour
- Rick Todd – professional golfer

=== Soccer ===
- Atzimba Casas – represented Mexico's women's national team in several tournaments
- Rocío Hernández – retired player and former Olympic team captain of the Puerto Rico women's national team
- Kelly Parker – She's the only player to have won the W-League MVP twice and also represented Canadian national team from 2003 to 2012
- Tori Paul – represents Trinidad and Tobago women's national team

=== Track and Field ===
- Tobi Amusan – world record holder in the 100 m hurdles
- Zakariah Barie – 1983 NCAA cross country champion
- Bob Beamon – Olympic gold medalist, world record holder in track and field
- Bert Cameron – 1983 World Champion in the 400 metres
- Asnage Castelly – Olympic wrestler
- Kjell Ove Hauge – four-time Norwegian shot put champion
- Jonah Koech – middle-distance runner
- Matthews Motshwarateu – long-distance runner; 1981 NCAA cross country champion
- Michael Musyoki – long-distance runner; Olympic medalist
- Suleiman Nyambui – long-distance runner; Olympic silver medalist
- Blessing Okagbare – Olympic and world medalist in the long jump
- Anthony Rotich – long-distance runner; four-time NCAA champion
- Gidamis Shahanga – long-distance runner
- Obadele Thompson – former 100 meters world record holder

=== Other ===
- Lindsey Larson – volleyball player; Canada women's national volleyball team
- Eric Kraan – speed skater

== Staff and faculty ==
- Renato Aguilera – professor of biological sciences
- Zuill Bailey – professor of cello, professional cellist
- Steven Best – professor of philosophy and co-founder of the North American Animal Liberation Press Office
- Andy Cohen – Major League Baseball second baseman who coached university team for 17 years
- Jorge Gardea-Torresdey – chemistry professor and nanoparticle researcher
- Laurie Ann Guerrero – writer and Texas Poet Laureate
- John Haddox – philosopher and Latin-Americanist
- Anna Jaquez – art professor
- Jorge López – physics professor and educator
- Urbici Soler y Manonelles – Spanish sculptor
- Diana Natalicio (born 1939), first female president of UTEP
- Denis O'Hearn – professor of sociology and anthropology
- Benjamin Alire Sáenz – writer
- Ellwyn R. Stoddard – professor emeritus of Sociology and Anthropology
- Myra Carroll Winkler (1880–1963) – second woman to serve as faculty at UTEP
