= Hispanic Federation =

U.S. nonprofit organization

Hispanic Federation, Inc.
- Founded: 1990
- Type: Non-profit; NGO
- Purpose: empower and advance Hispanic communities
- Headquarters: New York, New York, US
- Location: United States
- Fields: Advocacy, campaign, lobbying, reports,
- President: Frankie Miranda (executive)
- Main organ: Board of Directors
- Website: hispanicfederation.org

The Hispanic Federation (HF) is a U.S based non-governmental organization focused on supporting Hispanic communities through local, state, and national advocacy. The Federation was founded in New York City in 1990 by a small group of Latino leaders, establishing initiatives to advocate for the interests of the Hispanic community and has expanded to establish programs, and policies in 16 states. The organization's objective is to empower and advance the Hispanic community primarily through service pillars, membership services, advocacy, and community programs. The Federation has formed relationships with a network of 100 Latino grassroots nonprofits, as well as collaborating with organizations, government officials, and private sector partners to enact systemic change related to a variety of socioeconomic issues for Hispanic communities. The Federation has gained national recognition for its work in areas of education, health, immigration, economic empowerment, civic engagement, environment, and organizational development to strengthening Latino institutions to ultimately increase the quality of life within Hispanic communities.

== History ==
In 1990, a small group of Latinos in New York City founded Hispanic Federation to support Hispanic communities and strengthen Latino institutions throughout the United States of America. Since its foundation, HF has collaborated with many organizations focusing on a variety of socioeconomic issues.

The organization began by establishing a base with a weekly public affairs show on Spanish-language radio stations and implementing a public education campaign. In 1993, as a response to a lack of resources and/or support for administrative needs of Latino non-profit organizations, Hispanic Federation established the Latino CORE (Community Organization Resource Expansion) initiative, providing grants to organizations in support of infrastructural development, and has awarded over 1,000 grants and in partnership with grant-making initiatives has granted over $40 million to HF member agencies. HF carried out the first Latino Civic Participation Campaign in 1996 to increase political involvement, and has since registered more than 350,000 new voters.

By 1999, Hispanic Federation created and launched several long-term programs that continue to be implemented through their major initiatives. HF created the Hispanic Leadership Institute, a unique college-affiliated management program designed for Latino nonprofit organization managers, currently with over 200 Latino graduates. A health insurance program has helped over 60,000 Latino families to obtain health care by providing access to free or low-cost health insurance. In the mid-2000s, HF began an expansion to continue to advance the interests and aspirations of Latinos on a national level, opening an office in Washington, D.C., in 2005, and opening the Las Americas Conference Center in 2006, the first Latino nonprofit conference facility in the Northeast region.

The expansion of Hispanic Federation allowed for the organization to implement programs pertaining to other issues Hispanic communities face. In 2008, a foreclosure prevention program was implemented to help Latinos affected by the nation's mortgage crisis, as well as launching an agency-wide effort to raise awareness of environmental justice issues. In 2013, a satellite office opened in Connecticut further expanding is geographical presence to strengthen its services to Latino communities across the state.

Partnering with League of United Latin American Citizens (LULAC), Hispanic Federation implemented their first national immigration service initiative in 2014, working in ten states to assist with immigrant integration. A Central Florida office opened in 2015 to effectively support Hispanic communities in the Southeast USA. HF now works with network of 100 Latino grassroots nonprofits and collaborates with organizations, government officials, and private sector partners, and to establish and implement programs in 16 states.

Structure

Hispanic Federation has offices in New York, Washington, D.C., Connecticut and Florida, and uses a nonprofit network with more than 400 grassroots agencies. Hispanic Federation is managed by a board of directors, consisting of 18 members. Although HF operates through a network of organizations, the board of directors possesses a degree of independence from its members, allowing the organization to establish priorities. Frankie Miranda is the president of HF, and his role is to be the principal spokesperson, manage overall operations of the organization, as well as advocate for Hispanic grassroots organizations and pro-Latino legislation through the media, public officials, the private sector and the community. HF created the Policy Leadership Council, a group of community leaders and advocates form their grassroots nonprofit network, to establish policy priorities by identifying the crucial issues for Latino communities in the United States of America. The Policy Leadership Council partners with the overall grassroots nonprofit network, and uses agencies such as ASPIRA, El Puente, and LatinoJustice PRLDEF, to form coalitions to advance the priorities of the Council.

Funding

Hispanic Federation receives funding from corporations, foundations, and governments, as well as private donors. Hispanic Federation's total grants and contributions from government sources are within 25% to 49%, therefore the majority of funding relies on non-governmental sources. Approximately 90% of funds go directly to community services, receiving high ratings for transparency, accuracy, and responsibility for charitable giving by Better Business Bureau Accredited Charity, and GuideStar Exchange. Charity Navigator gave HF an overall score of 94.69 out of 100 for its financial responsibility and accountability & transparency in a report released in February 2018.

Strategy

Hispanic Federation supports Hispanic communities at the local, state, and national level primarily through three essential service pillars: membership services, advocacy and community programs. HF uses membership services to strengthen grassroots nonprofits to support core operational needs, through management classes, leadership training, recruitment, and workshops and seminars to provide Latinos with opportunities to develop essential skills. Advocacy services advance the interests and aspirations of Latinos through policy research, public education, advocacy, and voter mobilization. Advocacy services use reports and testimonials to highlight to a variety of inequalities and challenges for Latinos across the United States of America. Community assistance programs are designed to provide social services in a variety of socioeconomic areas to support individuals, families, and communities.

== Programs ==
=== Education ===
One of the main focuses of Hispanic Federation since its creation is investments in education for Hispanic communities. HF hosts an annual Hispanic Education Summit, the Northeastern region's largest community-wide gathering on Latino education, to advocate for policymakers to advance policies for improving Latino educational achievement, as well as creating strategies and recommendations for educational policymaking at the local, state and federal levels. HF supports all levels of education by conducting research and advocating for policies related to providing underserved students resources and opportunities for academic success. Through a variety of programs, Hispanic Federation launches campaigns for specific areas concerning education of Hispanics.

Pathways to Academic Excellence is an initiative to enable parents to support their children's education, divided into two main components: Pathways Early Childhood and Pathways College Prep. Pathways Early Childhood focuses on teaching parents and/or guardians techniques and skills to facilitate academic success for their children in areas such as literacy skills through language-building activities, providing resources, behavioural tracking, and collaborating with the school system to overcome social and academic challenge. Pathways College Prep is an initiative enabling parents and/or guardians to prepare their children for postsecondary education, supporting them through the application process, teaching them the advantages of education, importance of advanced placement classes, extracurricular activities, junior year, and college entrance exams, as well as developing relations with school counselors and providing resources for financial aid and scholarships.

In 2016, Hispanic Federation received a grant of $350 000 from the Bill & Melinda Gates Foundation towards their college readiness programs College Readiness Achievement and Retention (CREAR) Futuros is another program pertaining to post-secondary, focusing on systemic barriers for Hispanic students that have resulted in Hispanics having the lowest college graduation levels of any major racial group in the United States of America. CREAR Futuros addresses this issue by developing relations with public sector partners, such as The City University of New York (CUNY), private foundations, and corporations to implement student retention and achievement models, increasing Hispanic postsecondary graduation rates. In partnership with CUNY, CREAR Futuros focuses on providing Hispanic students with trained peer-mentors, academic tutoring, leadership training, and internships. Hispanic Federation plans on expanding this education program creating the CREAR 2.0 program to provide technology to facilitate learning, and National CREAR Futuros Initiative (NCFI) to expand the program to Connecticut, New Jersey and Florida.

Hispanic Federation's Latino CREAR Coalition is a program specific to New York City that advocates for improvements for postsecondary preparedness in public schools, working with community leaders, college leaders at New York State Hispanic Serving Institutions, New York City Department of Education (DOE), New York State Education Department (SED) leaders, elected officials, and other actors. These programs are threatened as New York State Governor Andrew Cuomo proposed a $500 million cut to the CUNY system. Because the CUNY system serves three quarters of all Latino undergraduates in New York City, Hispanic Federation is advocating for a restoration of funding to ensure Latino students have access to an affordable and high quality postsecondary education.

=== Health ===
Hispanic Federation is concerned with the management of health disparities through access to affordable healthcare, diminishing socio-economic obstacles that prevent Latinos to access healthcare. The promotion of healthcare for Latinos is accomplished through three central goals: increasing access to healthcare, supporting healthy lifestyles, and advocating for sexual reproductive health rights. Healthcare Enrolment is a program to increase access to healthcare, focusing on the issue access to quality, affordable medical care. This program was established to assist families in registering in Medicaid and Child Health Plus, expanded under the Affordable Care Act, and currently assists New York families and small businesses with the enrolment process of the Official Health Plan Marketplace.

Hispanic Federation has implemented a health program specific to the issue of HIV/AIDS in Latinos. In 1996, the Latinos Unidos Contra El SIDA (LUCES) HIV/AIDS Coalition was created in response to the AIDS epidemic in the United States of America disproportionately affecting Latinos. LUCES established initiatives, such as the Latino HIV Testing Month to provide a culturally-competent HIV/AIDS education and advocacy. The organization partnered with the Latino Commission on AIDS to create the National Latino AIDS Awareness Day and is currently recognized in over 300 cities across the U.S.A.

Hispanic Federation has implemented a variety of programs related to supporting healthy lifestyles. Get Up! Get Moving! (GUGM) Health Fair is hosted in New York and Florida to promote and encourage diverse physical activities, and provides health screenings for participants. Zumbando en el Barrio is another physical fitness program, promoting Zumba, with fitness, entertainment, and culture at the core of the initiative. SER Saludable is a program that partners with other nonprofit organizations implement an intergenerational initiative combining physical education clinics and nutrition education to promote healthy lifestyles, and started the SER Saludable Fitness Challenge to reinforce healthy habits.

The Latino Health Awareness Initiative addresses the issue of Latinos being disproportionately affected by a variety of health issues, focusing on education for diseases such as diabetes. Hispanic Federation worked with partners to launch Latino Diabetes Awareness Day and observe diabetes in the Latino community from a systematic perspective.

Hispanic Federation implemented an Anti-Asthma/Chronic Obstructive Pulmonary Disease (COPD) Initiative, launching a Hispanic Lung Health Education Campaign to raise awareness, and partner with 12 member agencies to provide asthma resource centers for Hispanics. HF addresses the lack of access to reproductive healthcare and knowledge sexual and reproductive rights that can result in reproductive cancers, unplanned pregnancies, sexual violence and sexually transmitted diseases.

Hispanic Federation partners with I Am/Yo Soy campaign to raise awareness of sexual health expanding on key principles: rights to decisions about birth control, abortion and parenting, increasing access to health care, highlight attempts to restrict sexuality education or reproductive health options, and developing communication skill for informing youth about sexual education.

=== Immigration ===
Hispanic Federation advocates for the protection and advancements of the rights of immigrants. Originally, the organization focused on advocacy at the local level, collaborating with member agencies to develop citizen campaigns and English as a Second Language (ESL). Immigration initiatives have expanded to provide immigrant integration services and advocate for immigration reforms at the national level. HF focuses supporting Hispanic immigrants with the challenges of immigrating into the United States of America through programs related to direct immigration services and Immigration advocacy.

A challenge for many Hispanic immigrants is learning English, therefore many of the organization's programs focus on providing these immigrants with educational opportunities. The Adult Basic Literacy and Education is an initiative specific to adult education in response to limited opportunities for immigrants to receive adult education, launching various programs such as Adult Basic Education (ABE), English of Speakers of Other Languages (ESOL) and GED programs. Hispanic Federation partners with League of United Latin American Citizens (LULAC) to implement the Hispanic Immigrant Integration Project (HIIP), provided in California, Connecticut, Illinois, Maryland, New Jersey, New York, Pennsylvania and Texas. This program facilitates integration of Latino immigrants into their community through ESL classes, assistance with citizenship applications, Deferred Action for Childhood Arrivals, and assistance with family-based petitions.

Hispanic Federation, along with Northern Manhattan Coalition for Immigrant Rights, Dominican Women's Development Center, and Community Association of Progressive Dominicans, opened Neighborhood Based Opportunity Center in New York in commitment to the Office for New Americans (ONA) initiative, providing participants with citizenship assistance and consultations, ESL classes, business seminars, and access to job opportunities. HF provides scholarships for immigrants who qualify for the Deferred Action for Childhood Arrivals (DACA) program, covering the $500 cost of the program's application.

For Immigration Advocacy, Hispanic Federation divided its efforts into National immigration reforms and state and local immigration reforms. Advocating for national reforms, Hispanic Federation collaborates with many organizations, such as LULAC, Labor Council for Latin American Advancement (LCLAA), and National Hispanic Leadership Agenda (NHLA) to advocate for immigration reforms through meeting with Congressional members and Administration officials, producing policy position letters, and present recommendations on immigrant executive action to the Federal government. Hispanic Federation advocates for state and local immigration reforms for issues specific to the region. In Florida, HF collaborates with We Are Florida coalition to eliminate with waiting period for immigrants to receive state health insurance.

In New York City, Hispanic Federation collaborates with Bill De Blasio's administration to provide undocumented immigrants with municipal identification cards. Hispanic Federation is one of over 150 member organizations of the New York Immigration Coalition (NYIC), creating a network of immigrant-serving organizations focusing on immigration issues related human and civil rights in New York City. The primary role of HF within the coalition is to function as a specialized and professionalized umbrella organization in areas of policy analysis and advocacy on immigration-related issues, civic participation, voter education, community education, and leadership development.

=== Economic empowerment ===
Hispanic Federation commits to economic empowerment of Latinos through personal finances and hunger relief campaigns. Hispanic Federation provides a Personal Finance Workshop series, offering interactive financial literacy workshops focused on budgeting, saving, and investing. This program supports Latino economic prosperity by teaching participants skills to proper financial decisions and money management. Hispanic Federation launched Lucha Contra El Hambre as part of their hunger relief campaign, a program focused on food support families in need throughout New York and Central Florida, as well as communities in Georgia, New Jersey, and Pennsylvania. Ford Motor Company partners with Hispanic Federation to support the Lucha Contra El Hambre campaign in New York City by providing an extensive food drive throughout underserved neighborhoods during the holiday season. The anti-hunger initiative has provided Latinos with over 1,000,000 meals since 2010.

=== Civic engagement ===
Hispanic Federation implements programs to increase civic engagement, informing Latinos of their political rights and civic duties through voter registration and social movements. HF increases Latino participation in the electoral process, assisting over 350,000 Latinos register to vote since its formation. In 2012, HF partnered with LCLAA and LULAC to launch Movimiento Hispano, a movement to increase civic engagement and voting in 25 states. The NYIC invites HF fieldworkers to organizational events to register new voters as to increase immigrants' access to political and civic institutions. The Hispanic Federation works with the non-partisan VoteRiders organization to spread state-specific information on voter ID requirements.

=== Environment ===
Hispanic Federation implements environmental equity initiatives as a social justice issue for Latino communities. Hispanic Federation defends Land and Water Conservation Fund and other legislations that protects the environment by educating lawmakers on the impact of environmental policies on Latino communities. Through the Latino Conservation Alliance and Healthy Parks, Hispanic Federation addresses clean water, clean air, access to green spaces, and other environmental issues. In 2014, the Latino Conservation Alliance (LCA) was formed to create the first Latino environmental coalition, consisting of Hispanic Federation, Green Latinos, Hispanic Access Foundation, Hispanics Enjoying Camping, Hunting, and the Outdoors (HECHO), La Madre Tierra, and Latino Outdoors. LCA promotes conservation priorities, including sustainable energy practices and the protection of public lands and national monuments, to protect natural resources of the United States of America. The Healthy Latinos Environmental Policy Report focuses on the impact of diabetes and obesity in Latino communities. HF addresses the lack of access to local parks and recreational areas for Latino communities, resulting in a health disparities across the country. The report advocates for funding towards the Land and Water Conservation Fund and preserving the Antiquities Act.

=== Organizational development ===
Hispanic Federation collaborates with a network of New York City Latino nonprofit organizations, strengthening relations to increase depth and geographic reach of their programs. Hispanic Federation focuses on capacity building through a variety of initiatives and programs. The organization implements institution building initiatives, investing community organizations by providing grants, advocacy, and organizational development assistance. The Latino CORE initiative, Hispanic Federation's main grant-making program, provides financial support for Latino non-profit organizations towards underfunded or unfunded projects.

Hispanic Federation receives funding from the Communities of Color Nonprofit Stabilization Fund, to provide funding to minority communities traditionally excluded from grant-making policies. In 2015, HF established the Entre Familia Nonprofit Learning Series, an initiative to support member agencies with capacity-building trainings and professional development opportunities. Hispanic Leadership Institute (HLI), in partnership with School of Public Affairs at Baruch College and the University of Connecticut, teaches Latinos leadership through management skills. In 2016, HF created the Latina Leadership Circle (LLC), an initiative providing leadership capacities for Latina member agency nonprofit executives.

== Criticisms ==
Hispanic Federation is criticized for their relations with corporate leaders influencing their organization's activities. In 2013, the lawsuit against the New York City Mayor Michael Bloomberg's policy to restrict sales of sugar-sweetened beverages was supported by multiple minority organizations. HF was criticized for lobbying for the interests of their investors by supporting the lawsuit against the restriction of sugar-sweetened beverages because of the organization's financial relations with Coca-Cola. Many organizations were criticized for promoting healthy lifestyles while supporting an industry contributing to obesity, however they defend their position from an economic position, claiming that an exemption to large chain stores would disadvantage minority-owned small business owners. Following the lawsuit, Coca-Cola became the co-chair of the Hispanic Federation Gala and awarded their Corporate Leadership Award. HF's President at the time, Lillian Lopez-Rodriguez, accepted the position as Coca-Cola's Hispanic Affairs Director shortly after the lawsuit.

In July 2014, Hispanic Federation was criticized after receiving $1.3 million from New York City, a significant increase from the previous year, having only received $307,000 in 2013. Criticisms claim City Council members have favoured certain nonprofit organizations in grant-making, and Hispanic Federation's discretionary funding is a pressing issue for the municipal government. The issue was not the amount received, but Hispanic Federation's relations with politically-connected lobbying firm and their influence on the City Council. The discretionary grant was seen as a conflict of interest because of the ties with lobbyist Luis Miranda Jr.'s MirRam Group. City Council Speaker Melissa Mark-Viverito is a MirRam client, allowing for her decision in grant-making to be influenced by lobbyists. Hispanic Federation has connections with the MirRam and is seen as a corrupt relationship. Hispanic Federation's Board of Directors is largely made up of from company managers with at least two being MirRam clients, and the corporate-dominated board allows for the advancement of interests of the lobbyist group to precede those of Latino communities.
