= LeTourneau =

LeTourneau, Létourneau or Letourneau can refer to:

== Organizations ==
- Orgues Létourneau, a Canadian pipe organ company
- LeTourneau L-2350, mining technology
- LeTourneau University, university founded by R. G. LeTourneau
- LeTourneau Empowering Global Solutions (LEGS), non-profit based in Longview, Texas
- LeTourneau Technologies, a manufacturing machines company

== People ==
- R.G. LeTourneau, U.S. businessperson, inventor and academic
- Charles Letourneau, 19th-century French anthropologist
- Mary Kay Letourneau, former teacher and child rapist
- Nicole Letourneau, Canadian academic

=== Arts and entertainment ===
- André Éric Létourneau, Canadian artist
- Anne Létourneau, Canadian actor
- François Létourneau, Canadian actor and writer
- Marthe Létourneau, Canadian soprano and teacher
- Omer Létourneau, Québécois musician
- Ryan Letourneau, a YouTuber known by the name Northernlion

=== Politics and law ===
- Gilles Létourneau, Canadian lawyer
- Jean-Charles Létourneau, Canadian notary
- Michel Létourneau, Canadian politician
- René Létourneau, Canadian politician
- Séverin Létourneau, Canadian politician and judge
- Jean Letourneau, French politician and lawyer
- Robert Letourneau, U.S. lawyer
- Sophie Létourneau, Canadian writer
- Yanick Létourneau, Canadian film producer

=== Sports ===
- Fanny Létourneau, Canadian synchronized swimmer
- Valérie Létourneau, Canadian mixed martial artist
- Danielle Letourneau, Canadian squash player
- David Letourneau, Canadian squash player
- Dean Letourneau, Canadian ice hockey player
- François Letourneau, Canadian slalom canoeist
- Louis Letourneau, Canadian ice hockey team owner
- Philippe Létourneau, Canadian racecar driver
