= Héctor Sánchez =

Héctor Sánchez may refer to:

- Héctor Sánchez (footballer, born 1985), Spanish footballer
- Héctor Sánchez (baseball) (born 1989), Venezuelan baseball player
- Héctor Sánchez (footballer, born 1997), Bolivian footballer
- Hector E. Sanchez, Mexican trade union leader

== See also ==
- Héctor Arenas Sánchez (born 1964), Mexican politician
