= Hector E. Sanchez =

Mexican-American community leader

Héctor E. Sánchez
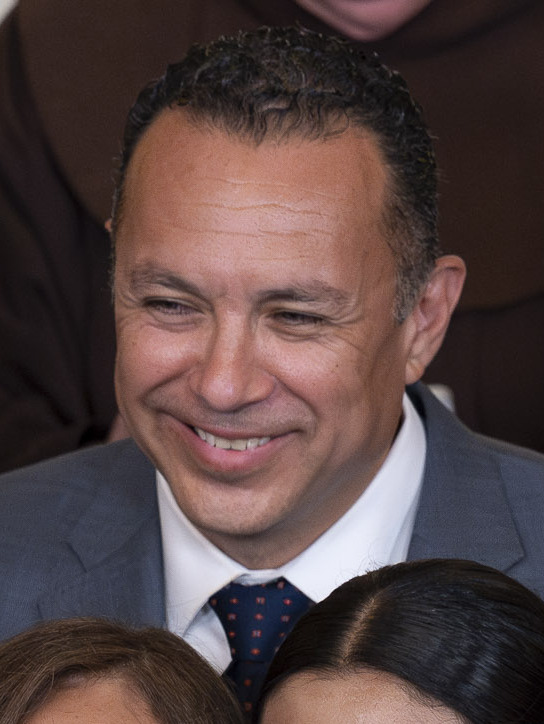
- Sanchez in 2024

CEO and Executive Director of Mi Familia Vota

Personal details
- Born: Héctor E. Sánchez Barba Celaya, Guanajuato, Mexico
- Education: University of Texas at El Paso
- Occupation: Latino and labor leader; academic; director of Planned Parenthood Global

Héctor E. Sánchez Barba is the president and CEO of Mi Familia Vota (MFV), and a prominent leader in the Latino community with a strong focus on building Latino political power and driving policy and politics at the state and national levels. As a leading voice in the fight against extremism and xenophobia in public policy, he has devoted his career to protecting democracy, empowering communities, and championing the rights of Latinos, immigrants, and vulnerable communities across the country.

Sánchez Barba has helped build the country's largest Latino political infrastructure in field organizing and has amplified the voices of Latinos and allies across the U.S. political landscape. His work has spurred Latino civic engagement, successfully challenged strategic voter suppression laws, opposed anti-immigrant bills, and has helped advance policy priorities for Latinas and all women.

== Recognitions and awards ==
He is recognized as one of the most influential Latinos and has received numerous national and international awards, including the Ohtli Award, an annual recognition bestowed by the Mexican Embassy in the US, as well as the Order of Civil Merit given by the Spanish government for his contributions to empowering Hispanic communities. He has received MALDEF's Excellence in Community Service Award; the Farmworker Justice Shelley Davis Memorial Award; the National Coalition of Black Civic Participation Spirit of Democracy Award; the Casa de Esperanza Champion Award; Dedication to the Community Award by the National Conference of Puerto Rican Women; and the Environmental Champion Award by the Green Room. Under his leadership, MFV and the Mi Familia Vota Education Fund (MFVEF) earned the 2021 Reed Awards for Best Field Program Pivot Amid Covid and Best Bootstrapped Field Campaign of the Year for the "Basta Trump" campaign.

== Career ==
He is Chair Emeritus of the National Hispanic Leadership Agenda; Board Chairman for Planned Parenthood Global; and sits on the national board of Planned Parenthood Federation of America. He is on Earthjustice's Board of Trustees and is a Senior Fellow at the George Washington University's Cisneros Hispanic Leadership Institute.

== Appearances ==
Sánchez Barba regularly appears as a commentator on national and international TV networks and frequently publishes opinion pieces on pressing policy issues. He is also a regular speaker at conferences across the country.

== Education ==
He holds a bachelor's and master's degree in political science from the University of Texas at El Paso.
