= Yanira Merino =

American trade unionist

Yanira Merino is a union activist and organizer and the first woman to be the national president for the Labor Council for Latin American Advancement (LCLAA).

She was born in Santa Tecla, El Salvador and moved to the United States when she was 14 years old. Her husband was a student activist and murdered by a death squad in El Salvador. During the 1980s, she traveled frequently between Los Angeles and El Salvador on behalf of human rights and women's groups affiliated with the Farabundo Marti National Liberation Front (FMLN). In 1987, she was abducted as she left a Committee in Solidarity with the People of El Salvador meeting in Los Angeles. The abductors cut her tongue and hands and carved the initials “E” and “M” (for “escuadores de la muerte,”) into her palms. She was beaten and raped and abandoned on a freeway embankment. Days later she was back at work.

In the 1990s, she worked to organize her coworkers in a shrimp processing facility in Los Angeles to address multiple issues: poverty wages, wage theft, discrimination, unsafe conditions, and verbal harassment. Her efforts succeeded when the nearly 100 workers voted to join Laborers’ International Union of North America (LIUNA) in November 1994. Merino was praised for her "clever tactics." Six months later, LIUNA hired Merino as a full-time organizer. She was hailed as "a modern-day heroine, an inspiration to women, to immigrants, the downtrodden, the complacent, to anyone who’s been disgruntled by the status quo in the workplace and felt impotent to alter that status."

Musical satirist Charlie King created a song about Yanira Merino reportedly after Pete Seeger sent King a Wall Street Journal article about Merino with a note saying "Woody would have written a song about this." The song was released on the album "I Struck Gold" by Charlie King and Karen Brandow in 2001 and performed at the Great Labor Arts Exchange in 2012. Merino was reportedly embarrassed by the Wall Street Journal article that inspired the song.

In 2014, she became the AFL-CIO National Immigration Campaign Manager. She was elected President of the Labor Council for Latin American Advancement in 2018.
