= Cindy-Lee Dennis =

Canadian professor

- Born: Port Burwell, Ontario, Canada
- Known for: Breastfeeding Self-Efficacy Scale, perinatal mental health, postpartum depression
- Spouse: Matthew D Turner
- Children: 2

Academic background
- Education: BScN 1991, PhD 1999, University of Toronto; MScN, 1995, University of Western Ontario
- Thesis: Development and psychometric testing of an instrument to measure self-efficacy in breastfeeding women A randomized controlled trial to evaluate the effect of telephone-based peer (mother-to-mother) support on breastfeeding duration among first-time mothers
- Website: www.cindyleedennis.ca

Cindy-Lee E. Dennis is a Canadian professor in the Lawrence Bloomberg Faculty of Nursing and an adjunct professor at the Faculty of Medicine, Department of Psychiatry at the University of Toronto. She is a senior scientist at the Lunenfeld-Tannenbaum Research Institute at Sinai Health and holds the Heather Reisman Chair in Perinatal Nursing Research at Mount Sinai Hospital in Toronto. She previously held the Women's Health Research Chair at Li Ka Shing Knowledge Institute, St. Michael's Hospital, the Canada Research Chair in Perinatal Community Health at the University of Toronto, and the Shirley Brown Chair in Women's Mental Health at Women's College Hospital. She is a fellow of the Canadian Academy of Health Sciences and a recipient of the Marcé Medal awarded by the International Marcé Society for Perinatal Mental Health. She is an internationally recognised expert in perinatal mental health and breastfeeding research, and the developer of the breastfeeding self-efficacy concept and theory, as well as the Breastfeeding Self-Efficacy Scale, which has been translated into over 20 languages. She is also a leader of large trials in maternal and paternal mental health.

== Early life and education ==
Dennis completed her Bachelor of Science in Nursing at the University of Toronto (U of T) in 1991 before enrolling at the University of Western Ontario for her Master's degree. Upon graduating in 1995, Dennis returned to U of T for her PhD before joining the University of British Columbia in 2000 for her postdoctoral fellowship in epidemiology.

== Career ==
Following her PhD and postdoctoral fellowship, Dennis joined the faculty at the University of Toronto in 2002, where she has focused her research career on rigorously evaluating interventions that can directly improve the health of mothers and fathers, with the overall goal of improving child health and well-being. She has over 25 years of experience leading large cohort studies and clinical trials — including intervention care models that leverage technology to improve clinical effectiveness and accessibility — recruiting participants from all across Canada. She also developed the Breastfeeding Self-Efficacy Scale, the most widely used breastfeeding measure internationally, which has been translated into over 20 different languages to identify women early who are at risk of poor breastfeeding outcomes. In 2003 she was awarded by the Ontario Ministry of Health and Long-term Care a Career Scientist Award and in 2005 she was awarded a Canadian Institutes of Health Research (CIHR) New Investigator Award. In 2007, she was appointed a Tier 2 Canada Research Chair in Perinatal Community Health. In 2011, she became the first nurse to receive Shirley Brown Chair in Women's Mental Health Research based at the Women's College Hospital's Research Institute.

As the Shirley Brown Chair, Dennis collaborated with Simone Vigod on studying depression in pregnancy and postpartum. She specifically focused on examining the impact of perinatal mental illness of both parents in the first two years of a child's life, to develop effective technology-based preventive and treatment interventions. In 2013, Dennis was honoured by the Mood Disorders Association of Ontario with the Hope Inspiration Award. At the same time, Dennis received a CIHR Grant to evaluate the effectiveness of a breastfeeding self-efficacy enhancing intervention. She also led seven large, multi-site studies related to improving breastfeeding rates and coordinating perinatal mental illness identification and treatment. As a result of her overall research, Dennis was appointed the Women's Health Research Chair at U of T and St. Michael's Hospital.

In 2018, Dennis was elected a Fellow of the Canadian Academy of Health Sciences. She was also awarded the Marcé Medal by the International Marcé Society for her "continued achievements and commitment to research in the field of prenatal and postnatal mental health in women."

== Academic Contributions ==
1. The Breastfeeding Self-Efficacy Scale (BSES)

This scale was developed by Dennis in the mid-1990s as part of her master's research at the University of Western Ontario. Grounded in Bandura's social cognitive theory, the instrument was designed to measure a mother's confidence in her ability to breastfeed successfully. The original scale and its subsequent short form (BSES-SF) have been translated and validated in numerous languages and cultural contexts, and have been used extensively in international breastfeeding research and clinical practice. The BSES has been applied to identify women at risk of early breastfeeding cessation, evaluate breastfeeding interventions, and guide the provision of individualized breastfeeding support. The scale has also informed the development of digital health initiatives and has been incorporated into international efforts to standardize patient-reported outcomes related to pregnancy and childbirth. The Breastfeeding Self-Efficacy Scale has been incorporated into the International Consortium for Health Outcomes Measurement (ICHOM) Pregnancy and Childbirth Standard Set, reflecting its role in assessing breastfeeding-related outcomes internationally.

2. Perinatal Mental Health

Dennis's research has focused extensively on advancing the prevention, identification, and treatment of perinatal mental health disorders, particularly perinatal depression and anxiety. Over more than two decades, she has led and collaborated on a large body of interdisciplinary research examining the causes, consequences, and management of mental health difficulties arising during pregnancy and the postpartum period. Her work has included randomized controlled trials, prospective cohort studies, implementation studies, evidence syntheses, and systematic reviews evaluating innovative models of care designed to improve access to effective interventions for parents. She has investigated a broad range of psychosocial and behavioural approaches, including peer support interventions, telephone-based interpersonal psychotherapy, collaborative care models integrated into primary and paediatric healthcare settings, decision aids to support treatment choices during pregnancy, and technology-enabled interventions delivered through the internet, mobile applications, and telemedicine platforms. Through this work, Dennis has contributed to developing scalable, accessible strategies to reduce barriers to mental healthcare for perinatal populations in Canada and internationally.

Dennis has also played a prominent role in synthesizing evidence to inform clinical practice and policy related to perinatal mental health. As an author and lead reviewer for multiple Cochrane systematic reviews, she has examined the effectiveness of interventions for the prevention and treatment of antenatal and postpartum depression and anxiety, helping to establish the evidence base for psychosocial and psychological approaches to care. Her research has extended beyond maternal outcomes to investigate the broader effects of perinatal mental health disorders on infant development, family functioning, and long-term health trajectories. Several of her studies have explored the relationship between perinatal anxiety and adverse maternal and child outcomes, contributing to increased recognition of anxiety disorders as an important but historically understudied aspect of perinatal mental health.

Recognizing that perinatal mental health challenges affect entire family systems, Dennis was among the researchers to expand the field's focus beyond mothers to include fathers and co-parents. As principal investigator of the IMPACT Study (Impact of Maternal and Paternal Postpartum Depression: Assessing Concurrent Depression in the Family), she investigated the prevalence and consequences of concurrent maternal and paternal postpartum depression and its implications for child development and family wellbeing. Her subsequent work has examined paternal postpartum depression, the mental health needs of fathers during the transition to parenthood, and the development and evaluation of interventions specifically designed to support fathers experiencing depressive symptoms during the postpartum period. This body of research has contributed to a growing recognition that fathers represent an important target for screening, prevention, and treatment efforts within perinatal mental healthcare systems.

As principal investigator and co-investigator, Dennis has secured and contributed to numerous nationally and internationally funded studies in perinatal mental health supported by organizations including the Canadian Institutes of Health Research (CIHR), the Patient-Centered Outcomes Research Institute (PCORI), the National Health and Medical Research Council of Australia, the National Science Foundation of China, and funding agencies in Ireland and the United Arab Emirates. Collectively, her programme of research has helped shape the contemporary understanding of perinatal mental health as a family health issue and has informed clinical guidelines, healthcare delivery models, public health strategies, and the development of evidence-based interventions used in diverse healthcare settings worldwide.

3. Large Perinatal Randomized Controlled Trials

Dennis has provided leadership on several major national and international research initiatives aimed at improving the health and wellbeing of parents and children across the life course. She is best known as the co-principal investigator of HeLTI Canada (Healthy Life Trajectories Initiative Canada), one of the largest maternal-child health intervention trials undertaken in Canada. Supported by more than CAD $17 million in funding from the Canadian Institutes of Health Research (CIHR), HeLTI Canada is part of an international consortium involving Canada, India, South Africa, and China, established to address the growing global burden of non-communicable diseases through early-life prevention strategies. Unlike traditional maternal-child health programmes that begin during pregnancy, HeLTI was designed to intervene before conception and continue through pregnancy, infancy, and early childhood, reflecting emerging evidence that the origins of lifelong health are shaped during these critical developmental periods.

Under Dennis's leadership with Catherine Birken, HeLTI Canada recruited more than 5,600 women and their families from every Canadian province and territory, making it one of the largest and most geographically diverse trials of its kind in the country. The study evaluates an intensive public health nurse-led collaborative care intervention aimed at improving parental health behaviours and psychosocial wellbeing, including nutrition, physical activity, mental health, parenting practices, and social support, with the ultimate goal of reducing childhood obesity and cardiometabolic risk. The trial represents one of the first large-scale efforts internationally to integrate preconception care into a population-based strategy for chronic disease prevention and health promotion. Through HeLTI Canada, Dennis has led a multidisciplinary team comprising investigators, clinicians, public health leaders, knowledge users, and trainees from disciplines including nursing, medicine, psychiatry, psychology, nutrition, epidemiology, implementation science, and health economics. The initiative has generated important insights into the feasibility of delivering complex, relationship-based interventions at scale and has contributed to a growing body of evidence supporting the importance of the first 1,000 days—and even the period before conception—in shaping lifelong health trajectories.

Beyond HeLTI Canada, Dennis has served as principal investigator and co-investigator on numerous large-scale studies examining breastfeeding, perinatal mental health, chronic disease prevention, and early childhood development. Her collaborative research has been supported by organizations including the Canadian Institutes of Health Research (CIHR), the Patient-Centered Outcomes Research Institute (PCORI) in the United States, the National Health and Medical Research Council of Australia, the National Science Foundation of China, and funding agencies in Ireland and the United Arab Emirates. Collectively, this body of work reflects Dennis's longstanding commitment to developing, evaluating, and implementing evidence-based interventions that improve the health of parents, children, and families in Canada and internationally.

== Awards and Honours ==
Dennis has received numerous national and international honours in recognition of her contributions to nursing science, perinatal mental health, breastfeeding research, and maternal-child health. In 2018, she was elected a Fellow of the Canadian Academy of Health Sciences (CAHS), one of Canada's highest distinctions in the health sciences, awarded to individuals whose leadership and scholarly achievements have advanced health research, healthcare, and health policy nationally and internationally. That same year, she received the Marcé Medal from the International Marcé Society for Perinatal Mental Health, an award recognizing individuals who have made outstanding scientific contributions to the understanding, prevention, and treatment of mental health disorders during pregnancy and the postpartum period. Dennis has held several prestigious endowed and government-supported research chairs throughout her career, including the Canada Research Chair in Perinatal Community Health (2007–2018), the Shirley Brown Chair in Women's Mental Health Research at Women's College Hospital (2011–2016), the Women's Health Research Chair at St. Michael's Hospital (2016–2023), and the Heather Reisman Chair in Perinatal Nursing Research at Sinai Health, which she assumed in 2024. Earlier in her career, she was awarded the Canadian Institutes of Health Research (CIHR) New Investigator Award and the Ontario Ministry of Health Career Scientist Award in recognition of her exceptional promise as an emerging researcher. In 2023, Dennis received Western University's Alumni of Distinction Award, honouring graduates whose professional achievements and leadership have distinguished their field and community. Collectively, these honours reflect Dennis's sustained record of excellence in research, mentorship, and knowledge translation, as well as her influence on advancing evidence-based care for women, infants, and families in Canada and around the world. In addition to these distinctions, she has been invited to serve as a visiting professor and international scholar at several leading institutions, including Karolinska Institutet in Sweden, La Trobe University in Australia, and the University of Western Sydney, reflecting the global impact of her scholarship and her standing as an internationally recognized leader in perinatal health research.

== Research Impact ==
Dennis's research has had a substantial international impact on the fields of perinatal mental health, breastfeeding, and maternal-child health. Over the course of her career, she has contributed to advancing the scientific understanding of perinatal depression and anxiety, improving breastfeeding outcomes, and developing family-centred approaches to supporting parents during pregnancy and the postpartum period. Her programme of research has informed the evidence base underlying interventions designed to prevent and treat mental health disorders during the perinatal period through randomized controlled trials, implementation studies, systematic reviews, and contributions to multiple Cochrane reviews. Dennis has also been recognized for expanding the scope of perinatal mental health research beyond mothers to include fathers and co-parents, helping to establish paternal postpartum depression as an important area of scientific inquiry and clinical practice.

One of Dennis's most influential contributions has been the development of the Breastfeeding Self-Efficacy Scale, a psychometric instrument designed to assess maternal confidence in breastfeeding. The scale has been translated into numerous languages and widely adopted by researchers and clinicians worldwide to identify individuals who require additional support, evaluate interventions, and guide breastfeeding promotion initiatives. Her work has also contributed to the development of innovative, accessible models of care, including peer support programmes, collaborative care approaches, telemedicine interventions, and digital mental health strategies to improve access to evidence-based support for families.

Dennis has authored more than 390 peer-reviewed publications, and her research has been cited extensively within the scientific literature. According to publicly available citation databases, her work has received more than 40,000 citations, with an h-index exceeding 100, reflecting both the breadth and sustained influence of her scholarship across multiple disciplines. In addition to her research contributions, Dennis has been invited to deliver keynote and distinguished lectures nationally and internationally, including presentations for organizations such as the International Marcé Society for Perinatal Mental Health, the Society for Reproductive and Infant Psychology, and academic institutions and professional associations across North America, Europe, Asia, and Australia. Her expertise has been sought by researchers, clinicians, and policymakers interested in improving maternal and family health outcomes through evidence-based approaches to prevention, treatment, and health system innovation.

Dennis has also assumed leadership roles within the international scientific community. She serves as President-Elect of the International Marcé Society for Perinatal Mental Health, one of the leading professional organizations dedicated to advancing research and clinical care related to mental health during pregnancy and the postpartum period. Through her research, mentorship, international collaborations, and leadership within the scientific community, Dennis has helped shape contemporary approaches to perinatal healthcare and advance recognition of the importance of supporting the mental health and well-being of mothers, fathers, infants, and families worldwide. Her work has influenced clinical practice, informed public health policy, and helped establish an evidence base that continues to guide research and care across diverse international settings.
