= National Association of Latino Elected and Appointed Officials =

Latino advocacy non-profit

National Association of Latino Elected and Appointed Officials (NALEO)
- Founded: 1976
- Founder: Edward R. Roybal
- Location: Los Angeles, California
- Website: Official website

The National Association of Latino Elected and Appointed Officials (NALEO) is the 501(c)(4) non-partisan leadership organization of the nation's more than 7,000 Latino elected and appointed Latino public officials in the United States. NALEO is governed by a 35-member Board of Directors composed of the nation’s Latino elected and appointed leadership with ex-officio representatives from Hispanic Elected Local Officials (HELO) of the National League of Cities, the National School Board Association’s National Hispanic Caucus of School Board Members, the National Hispanic Caucus of State Legislators and the Congressional Hispanic Caucus.

NALEO Educational Fund, founded in 1981, is the organization's 501(c)(3) arm, with a mission of facilitating full Latino participation in the American political process, from citizenship to public service. This organization achieves its mission through integrated strategies that include increasing the effectiveness of Latino policymakers, mobilizing the Latino community to engage in civic life, and promoting policies that advance Latino political engagement.

== History ==
Established in 1976 by U.S. Representative Edward R. Roybal, Harry Pachon, Robert Garcia, and others recognizing the need for a national network of Latino office-holders aimed at bringing together Hispanic and Latino Americans of all national origin groups, political affiliations, and levels of government. On September 29, 1976, the "National Association of Latino Democratic Officials" was incorporated. The group adopted its current name on May 11, 1978, to reflect the nonpartisan nature of the organization.

Congressman Edward R. Roybal served as NALEO president from 1976 to 1991, when the board of directors named him president emeritus.

NALEO develops and implements programs promoting the integration of Latino immigrants into American society, developing future leaders among Latino youth, providing assistance and training to Latino elected and appointed officials and by conducting research on issues important to the Latino population. The organization is a leading advocate for full Latino participation in the decennial census through their Hagase Contar campaign, providing resources and conducting national outreach, marketing, and media campaigns leading up to and during census operations.

Additionally, NALEO Educational Fund advocates for free and fair access to voting for Latino communities, and is a key member of the New Americans Campaign, a nonpartisan national network of nonprofit organizations committed to connecting lawful permanent residents (LPRs) to trusted legal assistance and critical information that simplifies the naturalization process in the United States.

The organization maintains a headquarters in Los Angeles, California, with primary satellite offices in Washington, D.C., and New York City.

== See also ==
- American GI Forum
- Congressional Hispanic Caucus
- Congressional Hispanic Conference
- LULAC
- NCLR
- National Hispanic Leadership Agenda
- Republican National Hispanic Assembly
