= Nicole Letourneau =

Canadian Professor and Researcher

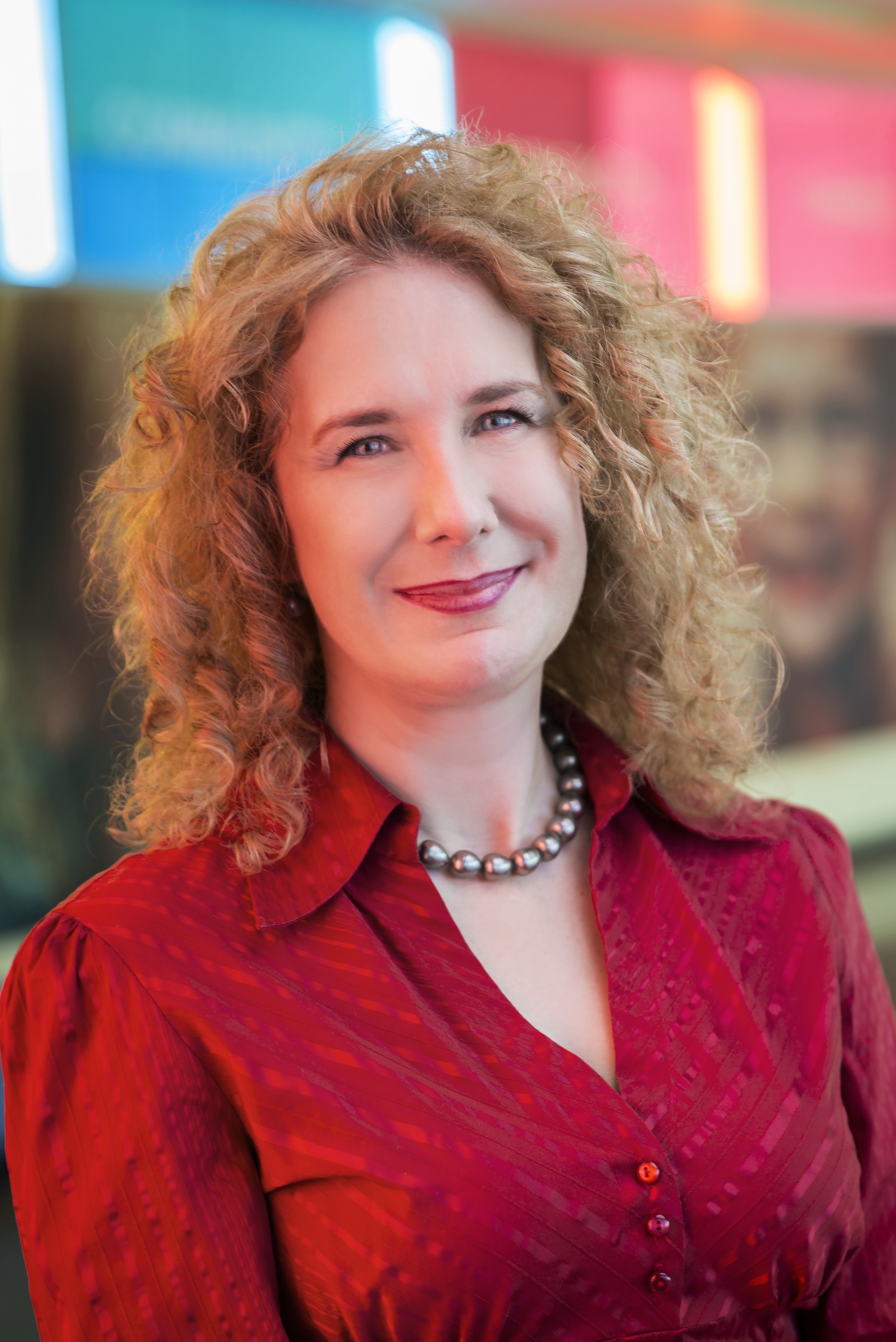
- Born: Fredericton, New Brunswick
- Education: University of New Brunswick; University of Alberta
- Occupations: Professor, Researcher
- Website: www.childstudies.ca

Nicole Lyn Letourneau (born in Fredericton, New Brunswick) is a Canadian professor and researcher. She is the University of Calgary Research Excellence Chair in Parent and Child Mental Health. Formerly she held Research Chairs in Parent and Infant./Child Mental Health funded by Alberta Children's Hospital, Palix/Norlien, and Newall Family Foundations (2011–2023). She currently serves as the Scientific Director of the Alliance against Violence and Adversity (AVA) Health Research Training Platform and Women's and Girls' Health Hub (funded by CIHR). She is also the director of RESOLVE Alberta and principal investigator for the CHILD (Child Health Implementation and Longitudinal Development) Studies Program at Alberta Children's Hospital Research Institute. She has written over 270 peer-reviewed publications; authored the books, Parenting and Child Development: Issues and Answers, What Kind of Parent Am I: Self-Surveys That Reveal The Impact of Toxic Stress Scientific Parenting: What Science reveals about Parental Impact, and has contributed more than 20 other books on parenting and childcare.

During the course of her career as a child mental health researcher, she has received many honors for her work. In 2023 she was inducted into the prestigious Royal Society of Canada. In 2022, she was inducted into the Canadian Academy of Nursing. In 2020, she was inducted into the American Academy of Nursing and received the prestigious Jeanne Mance Award, the Canadian Nurses Association’s highest honor for career achievement and impacts on Canadians’ health. In 2016, she received the Inspiration Award, bestowed by the Ministry of Human Services of Alberta. In 2015, she was named one of four Alberta Change Agents by Apple Magazine of Alberta Health Services. In 2014, she was named to the Canadian Academy of Health Sciences, one of the highest honours bestowed upon health researchers in Canada. She has received research merit awards from two Canadian Colleges of Nursing including Alberta's and New Brunswick's in 2011. She was featured in The Globe and Mail in 2008 when she was named to Canada's Top 40 Under 40 and has been named in Canada & North America's Who's Who. In 2007, she was named Canada's premier young investigator by the Canadian Institutes of Health Research (CIHR) in receiving the highest ranking in the entire New Investigator competition. She also received the University of Alberta Alumni Horizon award in 2004, recognizing outstanding early accomplishments of alumni.

== Early life and education ==
Letourneau was born in Fredericton, New Brunswick. She graduated from the Fredericton High School in 1987 and went on complete her baccalaureate degree in nursing from the University of New Brunswick in 1991, after which she successfully completed the requirements to be a Registered Nurse. After she became a Registered Nurse, she was employed in the surgery ward at the Dr. Everett Chalmers Regional Hospital as well as the Women and Children's unit at the Oromocto Public Hospital.

In 1992, she moved to Alberta and enrolled in the University of Alberta, where she received a fellowship from the National Health Research and Development Program. She completed her master's degree in 1994 and subsequently started her PhD in nursing from University of Alberta. Alongside her PhD, she served as a registered nurse at various hospitals including the University of Alberta Hospital working in pediatric surgery and intensive care, as well in pediatric homecare of Alberta Health Services.

== Career ==
After the completion of her PhD in 1998, she left her work as a nurse and became an assistant professor at the University of Alberta, where she had been working as a research assistant and researcher on various projects.

Letourneau received post-doctoral fellowships from Alberta Heritage Foundation for Medical Research (AHFMR) and CIHR for her research on support interventions for high-risk families affected by teenage motherhood, depression and other stressors.

In early 2003, Letourneau created the Child Health Intervention and Longitudinal Development (CHILD) Studies Program at the University of Alberta and moved back to her hometown of New Brunswick joining the University of New Brunswick as associate professor. Simultaneously, she became a research fellow at the Canadian Research Institute for Social Policy (CRISP) at the University of New Brunswick. During this time she became an adjunct professor at the University of Alberta to focus on her work at CHILD. Her research focus began changing from early childhood development to postpartum depression. In 2004, CIHR gave her a grant to conduct research on supporting families affected by postpartum depression.

In July 2007, Letourneau received tenure as a professor at the University of New Brunswick. In 2011, she left CRISP as well as University of New Brunswick and joined the Faculty of Nursing at University of Calgary. Simultaneously, she became a scientist at the Alberta Children's Hospital Research Institute. She received the Norlien/Alberta Children's Hospital Foundation Chair with grants totaling $1.4 million to conduct research on parent-infant mental health issues. This role has allowed her to focus most of her time on research.

After focusing on research in the Faculty of Nursing for a year, Letourneau joined to the Cumming School of Medicine attaining appointments in Pediatrics, Psychiatry and Community Health Sciences. In 2012, she was appointed as a director of RESOLVE Alberta (Research and Education to Solutions to Violence and Abuse) at the University of Calgary and in 2015, she served as an interim director at the Owerko Centre for Neurodevelopment and Child Mental Health.

As of 2016, Letourneau serves as the Professor of Nursing and Cumming School of Medicine at the University of Calgary and the director of RESOLVE Alberta. She is also the principal investigator of CHILD and the Research Chair in Parent and Child Mental Health. She is a member of many international societies, including a founding board member of the International Association for the Study of Attachment, member of the Society for Emotional and Attachment Studies, World Association for Infant Mental Health and Post-partum Support International.

She has a history of provincial and national governance, serving on the board of the New Brunswick Foundation for Health Research (2010–13), National Collaborating Centre on the Determinants of Health (2007–2011), CIHR Governing Council (2007–2014), including chair of the Standing Committee on Ethics and member of Nominating and Governance Committee, and institute advisory board of the CIHR Institute of Gender and Health (2005–2007) and finally Assisted Human Reproduction Canada (2008–12). She was the secretary of the board of Discovery House Family Violence Prevention Society (2017-2023), past president of the Alberta Association for Infant Mental Health (2017–19) and board chair of the College of Registered Nurses of Alberta (2020-2022).

== Research and writing ==
Letourneau's research work has been focused on parenting and child development. Initially her research was completely focus on psychological development in early childhood. However, a major part of her research has been focused on how postpartum depression affects parenting and child development. Her writings also deal with child rearing amidst complex social issues such as family violence and teen motherhood. Letourneau is one of the first nurse researchers to study the origins of fetal programming of infant stress reactivity and alterations in brain structure caused due to pre-natal depression. Her work focuses on how Parent-Child relationships affect health outcomes and interact with genotype in predicting mental health outcomes.

Building on her completed PhD, she attained her first grant as Co-Principal Investigator from AHFMR on a program to that was found to successfully promote maternal-child relationships between teenage mothers and their infants. Her first national funding was from the CIHR Institute of Neuroscience, Mental Health and Addiction on supports and services for mothers affected by postpartum depression. Her research highlighted women's needs and led to policy recommendations for reforms and improved services across Canada and culminated in a conference that attracted researchers, service providers, and policy makers. Thus began a history of attaining regular, substantial funding for projects with national impact.

She developed and tested MOMS (Mothers Offering Mentorship and Support) Link along with Dr. Cindy-Lee Dennis of the University of Toronto and in partnership with the province of New Brunswick. This program helps mothers suffering from postpartum depression. Subsequently, she launched a pilot program in New Brunswick. As part of the program, new mothers were signed up for a weekly one-on-one phone call with a woman who had experienced postpartum depression. In 2016, she began working on bringing the program to national audiences through partnership with Sykes.

She is also the principal investigator of the APrON (Alberta Pregnancy Outcomes and Nutrition) study. APrON is a longitudinal cohort of ~2200 mothers, fathers and their children, focused on mothers' and children's mental and physical health and nutrition. APrON was established through $5 million funding from Alberta Innovates (formerly AHFMR). To date, 150+ peer-reviewed publications and hundreds of presentations have been derived from these data.

For APrON, funding has been obtained to follow the sample until children are 12 years old ($1.9 million from ACHF). For a subsample (n=225/2200), called the Fetal Programming Cohort, Letourneau is Co-Principal Investigator and co-founder and has helped attain additional funding for more in-depth data collection on parental caregiving quality (videotaped lab visits at 6, 18 and 48 months of age), infant HPA-axis function (lab visits at 3, 6 and 18 months of age), epigenetics and genetics (blood and buccal collection at 3 months of age) via funding from CIHR, PolicyWise, ACHF, NCE AllerGen, KidsBrainHealth/NCE Neurodevnet and an anonymous donor totaling nearly $1 million. In 2023, Dr. Letourneau attained Canadian Institutes of Health Research funding to study depression and resilience in APrON youth between 15 and 17 years of age.

She has built on this success, with the VID-KIDS (Video-feedback interaction guidance for mothers with depression and their infants) study funded by CIHR (~$600,000), focused on supporting depressed mothers’ parent-infant relationship quality to promote infant mental health. With post-doctoral fellow Martha Hart, she also developed and tested the ATTACH (Attachment and Child Health) program, which was selected as a Frontiers of Innovation program by the Harvard Center on the Developing Child for its promise in addressing toxic stress impacts on children's mental health. It received a CIHR-SPOR ($1 million) grant to scale and spread ATTACH™ across Canada. Letourneau and Hart launched the online training program for health care professionals to receive instruction in ATTACH™ in 2019. More than seven publications have arisen from this research demonstrating the effectiveness of ATTACH on parent-child relationships including attachment, children's behavior and development, sleep, and even immune outcomes. Recent research involves testing the delivery of ATTACH online, with another $1 million from CIHR.

Letourneau has written over 211 peer-reviewed publications; authored the books, What Kind of Parent Am I?: Self-Surveys That Reveal the Impact of Toxic Stress and More, Scientific Parenting: What Science reveals about Parental Impact, and Parenting and Child Development: Issues and Answers, has contributed to more than 20 books on parenting and childcare.

== Personal life ==
She is married to Dean Mullin and has two sons.

== Honours and awards ==
- 2023 - Induction into Royal Society of Canada
- 2022 – Queen Elizabeth II Platinum Jubilee Medal
- 2022 – Canadian Academy of Nursing Fellow
- 2022 – International Society of Psychiatric-Mental Health Nurses Research Award
- 2021 – Killam Annual Professor
- 2020 – Jeanne Mance Award from Canadian Nurses Association
- 2020 – Inducted into American Academy of Nursing
- 2019 – Award for Excellence in Leadership from the Canadian Association of Perinatal and Women's Health Nursing
- 2017 – National Recipient of Center for Addiction and Mental Health (CAMH) Difference Maker Award
- 2017 – Canadian Association of Schools of Nursing Research Award
- 2016 – Inspiration Award (Ministry of Human Services, province of Alberta)
- 2016 – Peak Scholar Award for Research Innovation
- 2015 – Award of Excellence in Research (College and Association of Registered Nurses of Alberta)
- 2011 – Award of Merit: Research (Nurses Association of New Brunswick)
- 2010 – Visitorship Award (Harrison McCain Foundation)
- 2008 – Canada's Top 40 Under 40 (Caldwell Partners)
- 2007 – Canada Research Chair Tier II in Healthy Child Development
- 2006 – New Investigator Award (Peter Lougheed/CIHR)
- 2006 – Young Scholars Award (Harrison McCain Foundation)
- 2006 – Research Award (Canada Research Chairs Infrastructure Fund)
- 2005 – CRISP Award (National Data Training Centre, University of New Brunswick)
- 2004 – New Investigator Award (Canadian Institutes of Health Research, Regional Partnerships Program)
- 2004 – University of Alberta Alumni Horizon Award (University of Alberta)
- 2003 – New investigator (Canadian Institute for Advanced Research)
- 2003 – Outstanding New Investigator Award (Canadian Association for Nursing Research)

== Bibliography ==
=== Selected books ===
- Parenting and Child Development: Issues and Answers (2020)
- What Kind of Parent Am I?: Self-Surveys That Reveal the Impact of Toxic Stress and More (2018)
- Canada Needs to Rethink Approach to Early Childhood Development in Why We Need More Canadian Health Policy in the Media (2016)
- A Parent-first Approach Helps Children in Making Evidence Matter in Canadian Health Policy (2015)
- Scientific Parenting: What Science Reveals about Parental Influence (2013)
- Developmental Theories in Canadian Fundamentals of Nursing (5th ed.) (2012)
- Development Across the Lifespan in Fundamentals of Canadian Nursing: Concepts, Process and Practice (2012)
- Supporting Resilience Among Homeless Youth in Resilience in action (2008)
- Postpositivistic Critical Multiplism: A Beginning Dialogue in Philosophical and Theoretical Perspectives for Advanced Nursing Practice (4th ed.) (2006)
- Effect Size: What, Why, & How it is Determined? in Power in Research: Selected Issues for the Health Care Professional (2002)

=== Selected papers ===
- Announcing the Alliance against Violence and Adversity (AVA): a new Canadian Institutes of Health Research Training Platform (2023)
- Impacts of the Attachment and Child Health (ATTACH) Parenting Program on Mothers and Their Children at Risk of Maltreatment: Phase 2 Results (2023)
- COVID-19 and family violence: A rapid review of literature published up to 1 year after the pandemic declaration (2022)
- The Alberta Pregnancy Outcomes and Nutrition (APrON) longitudinal study: cohort profile and key findings from the first three years (2022)
- Development of a telephone-based peer support program for new mothers with postpartum depression (2016)
- The influence of newborn early literacy intervention programs in three Canadian provinces (2015)
- A narrative and meta-analytic review of the effectiveness of attachment interventions (2015)
- Quasi-experimental evaluation of a telephone-based peer support intervention for maternal depression (2015)
- How do interactions between early caregiving environment and genes influence health behavior? (2014)
- Socioeconomic status and child development: A meta-analysis. Journal of Emotional and Behavioral Disorders (2013)
- Mothers and infants exposed to intimate partner violence compensate (2013)
- Post-partum depression is a family affair: Addressing the impact on mothers, fathers and children (2012)
- Cortisol patterns of depressed mothers and their infants are related to maternal-infant interactive behaviours (2011)
- Identifying the support needs of fathers affected by postpartum depression: A pilot study (2011)
- Canadian mothers' perceived support needs during postpartum depression (2007)
- Adolescent mothers: Support needs, resources, and support education interventions (2004)
- Attrition among adolescents involved in a parenting program (2001)

== See also ==
- University of New Brunswick
- University of Alberta
- University of Calgary
