= Dennis deLeon =

American lawyer, activist and community leader (1948–2009)

- Born: Dennis Lawrence deLeon; July 16, 1948; Los Angeles, California, U.S.
- Died: December 14, 2009 (aged 61); Manhattan, New York City, U.S.
- Occupation: human rights lawyer
- Known for: HIV/AIDS activist and Latino community leader

Dennis deLeon (July 16, 1948 – December 14, 2009) was an American human rights lawyer, HIV/AIDS activist and Latino community leader. He served as New York City human rights commissioner and later became president of the Latino Commission on AIDS.

== Early life and education ==
Dennis Lawrence deLeon was born on July 16, 1948, in Los Angeles, California. His parents, Jess, a schoolteacher, and Josephine Munoz deLeon, were of Mexican descent.

He was graduated Bachelor of Arts by Occidental College in 1970 and had been student body president.

He was graduated Juris Doctor by Stanford University in 1974 after his studies at Stanford Law School. He had served on the Stanford Law Review.

== Career ==
He worked as a law clerk for a judge of the California Court of Appeals then became an associate at a private Los Angeles law firm, Kadison, Pfaelzer, Woodward, Quinn & Rossi. He moved to Washington, D.C., when recruited as a trial attorney for the United States Department of Justice. He moved back to California to become regional counsel to California Rural Legal Assistance.

=== New York City ===
In 1982, New York City Mayor, Ed Koch appointed deLeon senior assistant corporation counsel on the recommendation of Frederick A. O. Schwarz Jr., New York City's corporation counsel.

In 1986, David Dinkins, the Manhattan borough president, named deLeon as his deputy borough president. When Dinkins became mayor in 1990, he appointed deLeon the city's human rights commissioner.

=== The New York Times op-ed ===
In 1993, deLeon became one of the first New York city officials to disclose publicly his HIV status when he wrote My Hopes, My Fears, My Disease published in The New York Times.

=== President, Latino Commission on AIDS ===
After briefly returning to private practice, deLeon was selected as president of the Latino Commission on AIDS in September 1994 and remained in that post until a few months before his death. Under his leadership, the organization grew from a staff of two into a national organization with a staff of 45, annual budget of $5 million and working in partnership with 380 other organizations around the United States including its territories. During his time, the Latino Commission on AIDS brought into being a national Spanish-language clearinghouse for AIDS information, worked with Spanish-speaking churches to build a network of AIDS prevention programs. It also provided structures for the mobilization of gay Latinos, immigrants, women and inmates living with AIDS. In 2003, it sponsored the first National Latino AIDS Awareness Day.

== Illness and death ==
He was diagnosed with HIV in 1986. On December 14, 2009, Dennis deLeon died in Manhattan. He was survived by his partner of 32 years, Bruce Kiernan.
