= National Latino AIDS Awareness Day =

Observed on October 15

- Founded: October 15, 2003
- Location: 24 W 25th Street, 9th Floor, New York, NY 10010 US
- Region served: United States and its territories
- Method: community mobilization and social marketing
- Key people: latinoaids.org hispanicfederation.org
- Website: www.nlaad.org

National Latino AIDS Awareness Day (NLAAD) (Spanish: El Día Nacional de Concientización Latina del SIDA) takes place in the United States of America and its territories on October 15, the last day of National Hispanic Heritage Month, and aims to increase awareness of human immunodeficiency virus/acquired immunodeficiency syndrome (HIV/AIDS) in the Hispanic/Latino population living in the United States including Puerto Rico and the US Virgin Islands. It is a national community mobilizing and social marketing campaign co-ordinated by the Latino Commission on AIDS and the Hispanic Federation in partnership with commercial sponsors, community and public health organisations.

== National coordination, local ownership ==
A National Planning Committee coordinates NLAAD, retains a national convenor and supplies participating organisations with materials such as campaign kits and with advice. Each local participating organisation organises its own activities tailored to their particular community. All aim to promote or sponsor prevention activities, including counselling and testing. Some also undertake to educate community leaders and public officials in reducing new infections and caring for Latinos living with HIV/AIDS. Some organise cultural events and celebrations. Each local group is largely responsible for raising funds for their organized activities.

== History ==
=== 2003 ===
The first NLAAD was in 2003, initiated by the Latino Commission on AIDS under the leadership of Dennis deLeon joined by the Hispanic Federation and attracted support from various community groups. In a media release announcing the event, deLeon was quoted: "AIDS has disproportionately affected Latinos whom represent 14% of the United States population (including Puerto Rico), but as a percentage of the national number of People Living with AIDS, Latinos represent a staggering 20%. ... There is no reason why Latinos should be disproportionately affected except for neglect by community leaders and government funders". The day was observed in more than 100 cities around the United States including New York, Miami, Los Angeles and Chicago. Events around the theme Prevention Saves Lives included "proclamation ceremonies", press conferences, educational and cultural events, HIV testing and counselling.

=== 2004 ===
The theme for NLAAD in 2004 was Abre Los Ojos: el VIH No Tiene Fronteras - Open Your Eyes: HIV Has No Borders. The day was recognised with statements by Tommy Thompson as Secretary of Health and Human Services and Anthony Fauci as Director of National Institute of Allergy and Infectious Diseases Activities were organised in almost 250 cities in 45 states "to increase HIV awareness among Latinos, and to address the stigma and discrimination associated with AIDS" and attracted sponsors including American Airlines, Verizon Foundation, Abbott Laboratories, Boehringer Ingelheim, Terra, PR Newswire, Viacom, Univision and NBC/Telemundo.

=== 2005 ===
By the third NLAAD in 2005, the number of community partner organisations had reached 1000 and the day was marked in more than 350 cities in 46 states and in Puerto Rico and the Virgin Islands around the message Abre los ojos: Ama Tu Vida, Protegete, Hazte La Prueba - Open Your Eyes: Love Your Life, Protect Yourself, Get Tested. Activities included prevention education, free testing, press conferences, public service announcements on major television networks and a Congressional briefing in Washington, D.C., on 18 October 2005.

=== 2006 ===
Saber Es Poder. Infórmate. Hazte La Prueba Del VIH - Knowledge is Power. Get the Facts. Get Tested for HIV. was the theme of the 2006 NLAAD.

=== 2007 ===
The fifth NLAAD in 2007 adopted the theme Despierta! Toma Control! Hazte la Prueba del VIH! Wake Up! Take Control! Take the HIV Test!. Publicity was also given to a draft Hispanic/Latino national agenda prepared by "Hispanic/Latino organizations, departments of health, elected and designated officials".

=== 2008 ===
United We Can: HIV/AIDS Stops Here. Prevention Starts With Us. Unidos Podemos: Detengamos Al VIH/SIDA. La Prevencion Empieza Con Nosotros was the theme for the sixth NLAAD in 2008. NLAAD claimed "380 partners who together, organized 160 events in 101 cities across the United States, Puerto Rico, and the U.S. Virgin Islands."

2008 also saw the release of "SOY" ("I AM") as an official media component of NLAAD. Produced by The Kaiser Family Foundation and Univision Communications, SOY was described as a "Spanish-language media campaign featuring the personal stories of a diverse group of Latinos living with HIV and the people who love them."

=== 2009 ===
The seventh NLAAD in 2009 adopted the theme United We Can Stop HIV and Prevent AIDS" - Unidos Podemos Detener el VIH y Prevenir el SIDA, placing an emphasis on community unity. NLAAD reported 420 partners and 350 events in 35 states in 2009.

=== 2010 ===
Save a Life, It May be your Own. Get Tested for HIV was chosen as the theme for the eighth NLAAD in 2010. In the lead-up to the day, there was an official launch of a new NLAAD bi-lingual website. 131 registered events were listed at the website.

=== 2011 ===
The theme for the ninth NLAAD was Latinos stand together! Let's stay healthy! Get Tested for HIV placing HIV awareness in a general health awareness context.
