= LeTourneau Empowering Global Solutions =

LEGS (LeTourneau Engineering Global Solutions)
- Founded: 2004
- Founder: Dr. Roger Gonzalez
- Type: Non-Profit Organization
- Location: Longview, Texas, United States
- Region served: 4 countries
- Website: legsforall.com

LeTourneau Engineering Global Solutions (LEGS) became LIMBS International in 2010 and is a non-profit initiative based in Longview, Texas, focused on bringing innovative, extremely low cost, high-quality prosthetic technology to people in developing nations. The focus of LEGS/LIMBS technology is its M1 Knee, a polycentric knee joint that meets international standards and can be manufactured locally for as little as $15 USD.

== History ==
Founded in 2004, LEGS is a multidisciplinary technology development program operated by LeTourneau University (LETU) in Longview, Texas. The program built on synergies between the undergraduate educational programs of the university and faculty research interests to create a focused program of product development. This is still the case as LIMBS works with students at The University of Texas at El Paso (UTEP).

Resident engineering expertise in biomechanics, materials, manufacturing and mechanical systems is combined with established prosthetics theory and practice. As a result, LEGS’ engineers design and produce new and innovative prosthetic component systems, which are highly functional and durable at minimum expense.

The genesis of the LEGS/LIMBS Program can be traced back to when its executive director, LeTourneau University biomedical engineering professor Dr. Roger Gonzalez, was a young boy living in El Paso, Texas. As documented in an El Paso TEDx Talk, during a family trip across the border to poverty-stricken Juarez, Mexico, he saw helpless, crippled children and adult amputees, unable to walk or work, begging for money along the roadsides. He remembers his father saying, “There, but for the grace of God, go you and I.” That experience had a profound impact on his young heart.

In 2004, Dr. Gonzalez launched a senior biomedical engineering design project known as LeTourneau Engineering Global Solutions (LEGS). The challenge was to design and build a low-cost above-the-knee (AK) prosthetic that was durable, maintenance-free and could be easily manufactured in developing countries. “Our goal was to take advanced, first world technology and reverse-engineer the expense out of it, to produce a low-cost prosthetic that would work well in the rough, uneven terrain of developing nations."

By combining in-house engineering expertise with modern assessment tools, the LEGS teams developed initial prototypes for both a prosthetic knee and foot. These prototypes were extensively tested in LETU’s labs to verify their basic performance. The teams then worked with local amputees to assess how the prototype designs would work on an actual prosthetic limb.

Gait analysis sessions were undertaken using a sophisticated motion camera systems. The students assessed the patient’s stride length, cadence and energy consumption. The results of these tests were extremely positive and indicated that the team was ready for the next important step––validating their design in the harsh conditions of the developing world.

In the summer of 2005, the first LEGS prosthetic prototypes were manufactured and tested at CURE International’s Bethany Crippled Children’s Center in Kijabe, Kenya. Dr. Gonzalez and four senior engineering students spent three weeks providing about a dozen disabled Kenyans, mostly children, with prosthetic legs. They also provided the raw materials to produce additional legs.

In many poor developing countries, the standard lower limb prosthetic is a “peg leg” that requires the amputee to swing the leg around from the hip, causing abnormal gait and strained muscular development that leads to long-term orthopedic problems and pain. “Our prosthetic knee design leg is far more functional because it simulates natural movement, rotating freely during the leg swing and then automatically locking when they put weight on it,” says Dr. Gonzalez. “The knee is also designed to meet international performance standards as set forth by the International Organization for Standardization (ISO).”

In 2010 LEGS became an independent non-profit LIMBS International and has evolved in how its technology and services.

== Overview of international work ==
Currently, LEGS/LIMBS technology is present in Bangladesh, Kenya, Senegal, and Sierra Leone in over a dozen local clinics within these countries. Each of these countries has international NGO partners who host LEGS/LIMBS when they are on the ground. Currently, LEGS/LIMBS does not fit patients; rather it teaches local clinicians how to manufacture the LEGS M1 knee using locally obtainable materials. LEGS/LIMBS evaluates sites that can best benefit from its technology, and then holds Demonstration Clinics and Technology Transfer Workshops to teach the manufacturing and technology of the LEGS/LIMBS knee most effectively.

=== Kenya ===
In the African Great Lakes, the LEGS/LIMBS team has had a relationship with AIC-Cure International in Kijabe, Kenya for five years. AIC-Cure International Children’s Hospital fits both children and adults in need of above-knee prosthetic devices, and has done so since 1998. The LEGS team has fitted dozens of patients at AIC-Cure with the LEGS/LIMBS knee, and has begun to teach local clinicians how to manufacture the LEGS knee as the technology has improved. During the time spent in Kenya this past summer, the team held a Technology Demonstration. This is different from a workshop in that the team only presented the LEGS technology package, as the local clinics did not have a chance to produce their own knees. This approach was due in part to the limited amount of time the team had available to spend in Kenya, as well as the large number of people attending the demonstration. 15 different people from seven different entities related to prosthetics attended the demonstration. The attendees were from other parts of Kenya, as well as other countries in the African Great Lakes. Many were interested in implementing LEGS technology in their clinics, and the LEGS team hopes to visit other clinics on return visits to Kenya.

=== Bangladesh ===
A Technology Transfer Workshop was held in Savar, Bangladesh in the summer of 2009. The LEGS/LIMBS team performed the workshop at the Center for the Rehabilitation of the Paralyzed (CRP) and was hosted by the Memorial Christian Hospital of Bangladesh (MCH). The LEGS team has had a relationship with MCH for four years. MCH personnel have worked towards improving the lives of amputees in rural Bangladesh for decades. The CRP hosted the workshops for several days in July 2009, and there were 15 different individuals from four different entities related to prosthetics. Besides demonstrating the manufacturing of a LEGS/LIMBS knee for local participants, the LEGS team did minor repairs and outcomes testing on ten individuals who had been previously fitted with the LEGS/LIMBS Knee.

=== Senegal ===
The LEGS/LIMBS team conducted its first Technology Transfer Workshop (TTW) in Senegal in the summer of 2009. The goal of this workshop was to introduce the LEGS/LIMBS knee as another prosthetic option, and to teach local clinicians in the manufacturing of the LEGS knee, which would be used as part of a complete prosthetic limb for amputees.

The LEGS/LIMBS team was hosted in Senegal by Dr. Amadou Koura Ndao, Director of the Centre National d’Appareillage Orthopedie in Senegal. The center has operated for many years and has been providing service to the disabled of Senegal. The TTW was attended by officials from four different organizations related to prosthetics. Some were from other parts of Senegal, and some were from different countries in West Africa, all of whom were very impressed by the LEGS/LIMBS technology. In fact, the Senegalese Ministry of Health was so impressed with the Workshop put on by the LEGS/LIMBS team that officials have offered to collaborate with clinics in Senegal to provide them with the Delrin plastic necessary for producing the LEGS/LIMBS knee, lowering the costs of production even further. The LEGS team plans to return to Senegal next summer to follow up with the patients that it fitted this past summer, and to expand its available technology around the region.

=== Sierra Leone ===
The LEGS/LIMBS team was active in Sierra Leone from 2007-2008. Their first trip in January 2007 was to evaluate the potential for having Sierra Leone as a hub. During this time, [Mercy Ships-New Steps] became LEGS’ host during their trips to Sierra Leone. This was followed by a trip in 2008 where LEGS held a TTW in the National Center for Rehabilitation in Freetown. The TTW was attended by NGO’s such as Handicap International (HI) and the Prosthetic Outreach Foundation (POF). After Mercy Ships-New Steps pulled out of Sierra Leone, the LEGS team lost its host, and was unable to return. However, local professionals working for POF are still manufacturing the LEGS M1 Knee, proving that LEGS technology is a viable option for a locally obtainable prosthetic solution.

=== Laboratory-based patient outcomes evaluation ===
The LEGS Outcomes and Rehabilitation Research team is responsible for evaluating outcomes for patients using LEGS prosthetic technology and for developing guidelines for prosthetists and therapists to use in the rehabilitation of patients using the technology. This includes the development of programs for both laboratory evaluations here in the U.S. as well as field evaluations at LEGS overseas sites.

Laboratory evaluations of patient outcomes are conducted in two ways:

- Quantitative assessments using motion-capture camera systems, a multi-sensor walking mat and respirometry-based physiological assessments.
- Qualitative evaluations focusing on patient feedback and established evaluation questionnaires.

All of the laboratory evaluations involve volunteer amputees who are fitted with a LEGS prosthesis and a comparative U.S. commercial prosthesis by their personal prosthetist. All U.S. laboratory assessments are conducted on the campus of LeTourneau University. International patient outcomes have confirmed that the LEGS/LIMBS knee meets international standards, and maintains its functionality, even after several years of use in the field.
