= Monica Garcia (news anchor) =

American news anchor

- Born: Kansas, U.S.
- Education: University of Texas at El Paso
- Occupation: News Anchor
- Employer: KVOA
- Spouse: Jonathon
- Children: 3

Instagram information
- Page: monicazgarcia
- Years active: 2012-present
- Followers: 106 thousand

Monica Garcia is an American television journalist, news anchor, and former writer. She is the main evening anchor at NBC affiliate News 4 Tucson, having previously worked at Arizona's Family in Phoenix and News 4 Tucson earlier in her career.

== Early life and education ==
Monica Garcia grew up in Kansas. In 1914, her great-grandmother immigrated from Zacatecas, Mexico to Kansas to work on the railroads. After her step-father's deportation, Garcia moved to and attended and graduated from high school in Juarez, Chihuahua, where she learned Spanish. She later graduated from the University of Texas at El Paso, with a degree in Journalism.

== Career ==
Garcia began her career in Washington, D.C., working as a production assistant and writer for NBC affiliate WRC-TV. She then worked at the San Diego Union-Tribune in California and worked in Jacksonville, Florida, at WJXX and WLTV. She also worked at KPHO-TV in Phoenix.

Garcia worked as a morning reporter at News 4 Tucson from 2014 to 2016.

In July 2014, Garcia co-hosted the inaugural Tucson Michelada Challenge at La Fuente Restaurant in Tucson, Arizona alongside Hot 98.3 radio personality D-Wayne Chavez.

Later, Garcia worked as weekend morning anchor for Arizona's Family News 3TV. She also worked for KPNX.

In June 2022, Garcia left Arizona's Family to work for a public-relations firm in Tempe, Arizona, but returned to News 4 Tucson later that year as the main anchor, co-anchoring the 4, 6, and 10 p.m. newscasts.

In November 2022, Garcia participated as a model in a charity fashion show and holiday market organized by BNI 6 Figure Success. The event raised money for the Oro Valley Rotary Club and its supported charities, IMPACT and EMERGE Center Against Domestic Violence.

=== Nancy Guthrie coverage ===
In February 2026, according to Hindustan Times, Garcia shared on X that a local couple had discovered a black glove that appeared to have blood on it about a mile from Guthrie's home on February 11. Garcia reported that the couple said they had found the glove while driving through the neighborhood to join the search, and that another pair of gloves had been found approximately 10 feet away. The couple reportedly did not touch the gloves and contacted the FBI tip line and the Pima County Sheriff's Department before calling 911. Hindustan Times also reported that Garcia shared an image of the glove.

== Notable reporting ==
=== Nancy Guthrie on-air error ===
In March 2026, Garcia anchored KVOA's one-hour special Bring Her Home: The Disappearance of Nancy Guthrie. During an interview with Pima County Sheriff Chris Nanos in the program, she incorrectly referred to the night of Sunday, January 31 (Guthrie was last seen on Saturday, January 31 and reported missing on Sunday, February 1). The error was noted by many viewers on social media.

=== Hurricane Florence coverage ===
While covering Hurricane Florence in 2018, Garcia and her photographer were shooting video near downtown Lumberton, North Carolina, in an area devastated by flooding, when they heard a cry for help. They spotted a man waving a T-shirt in the air and called rescue crews who were loading up for the day.

== Awards ==
In 2022, Garcia was part of the Arizona's Family news team nominated for a Rocky Mountain Southwest Emmy Awards for continuing coverage for the segment Officers Ambushed.

In 2026, Garcia was nominated for three Rocky Mountain Southwest Emmy Awards for "The Unsheltered Crisis" in the Diversity/Equity/Inclusion – News category, "The Disappearance of Nancy Guthrie" in the Content Shorts category, and News 4 Tucson @ 6 in the Daytime/Evening Newscast Medium/Small Markets category.

== Personal life ==
Garcia is married to Jonathon and they share three children. (Note: News 4 Tucson KVOA-TV (2025-01-10). Monica Garcia welcomes baby Montserret to the family – via YouTube.)
