= Joel Neftali Martinez =

Mexican-American bishop

Joel Neftali Martinez is a Mexican-American bishop of the United Methodist Church, elected in 1992. Prior to his election to the episcopacy, Rev. Martinez gained notability as a Pastor and District Superintendent in the Methodist and United Methodist Churches and as a denominational official in the area of ethnic ministries.

== Birth and family ==
Martinez was born 3 February 1940 in Seguin, Texas. He was the eldest of four children born to Guadalupe and Dora Martinez. Martinez is a grandson of sharecropper farmers who came to the United States at the end of the nineteenth century. Martinez was baptized at the Iglesia Metodista Unida La Trinidad, where his parents are still active members.

Martinez met Raquel Mora while in college in El Paso, Texas. They were married 9 June 1961. She was born in Allende, Coahuila, Mexico, where her father was a Methodist pastor. The Mora family came to the United States when Raquel was twelve years old. Joel and Raquel have three children: Patricia, John and Rebeca.

== Education ==
Martinez earned the B.A. degree in history from the University of Texas at El Paso in 1961. His wife attended the Lydia Patterson Institute in El Paso at the same time. Martinez went on to graduate from the Perkins School of Theology at Southern Methodist University, Dallas, Texas in 1965, earning the M.Div. degree. Martinez received the Distinguished Alumni Award from Perkins in 1995. He also was honored with the honorary degree D.D. by Nebraska Wesleyan University in 1993. His wife has a degree in Music Education from UTEP and a Master of Sacred Music degree from Perkins.

== Ordained ministry ==
Martinez was ordained a Deacon in the Rio Grande Annual Conference of The Methodist Church in 1962. He was ordained Elder in 1965. Bishop Paul E. Martin presided at both ordinations.

Martinez served the following appointments as Pastor: El Buen Methodist Church, Dallas, Texas (1965–70) and the Emanuel Church, El Paso, Texas (1970–79). From 1973 until 1975 he also served as the Director of Planning and Development for the Newark-Houchen Center in El Paso.

In 1975 Martinez was appointed the Executive Secretary of the Office of Ethnic and Language Ministries of the National Division of the General Board of Global Ministries of the U.M. Church, serving in this capacity until 1981. He was then appointed Superintendent of the Northern District of the Rio Grande Annual Conference of the U.M. Church, with headquarters in San Antonio, Texas (1981–87). His last appointment before election to the Episcopacy was as Pastor of the Emanu-El Church in Dallas (1987–92).

== Service to the United Methodist Church ==
Prior to his election to the episcopacy, Martinez gave leadership to many areas of the worldwide United Methodist Church. He was a member of the General Council on Ministries (1984–88), and of the World Methodist Council (1986–91). He was elected a Delegate to the South Central Jurisdictional Conference in 1984, and to the U.M. General Conference in 1988 and 1992. He also represented the church as a Delegate to the Seventh Assembly of the World Council of Churches, 1991 in Canberra, Australia. He also served as Chairperson, Division of Human Relations, U.M. General Board of Church and Society (1972–75).

== Involvement in labor and ethnic issues ==
From early exposure to the plight of farm workers, and later in student ministry to migrant workers, Martinez learned to appreciate the urgent need for poor people to organize themselves in order to participate more equitably in society. He worked with Cesar Chavez during the 1970s. He worked to establish the first federally funded health clinic for the poor of El Paso. Martinez also was a founding member of the National Hispanic Caucus in the U.M. Church in 1970. He also supported the organizing of poor fishermen on the island of Puerto Rico in the late 1970s.

Martinez worked on the initial proposals to the 1976 U.M. General Conference for a Missional Priority on the Ethnic Minority Local Church. He served on the Ethnic Minority Local Church Inter-Agency Committee on the Missional Priority (1976–80). He later chaired the National Missional Priority Coordinating Committee during the 1984-88 quadrennium. During the 1988-92 quadrennium, he served as Secretary of the National Committee to Develop a Plan for Hispanic Ministry, and was President of the National Hispanic Caucus (1987–90).

== Ecumenical ministry ==
Martinez has always worked ecumenically in his ministry. For example, he served as the President of the Greater Dallas Community of Churches in the late 1980s and early 1990s. He also was a delegate to the Seventh Assembly of the World Council of Churches, Canberra, Australia in 1991. He was a member of the Finance Committee of the National Council of Churches in the U.S.A. (1979–80). He was also a member of the Board of Directors of the Seminaro Evangelico of Puerto Rico (1975–81).

== Episcopal ministry ==
Martinez was elected and consecrated a Bishop of the United Methodist Church by the 1992 South Central Jurisdictional Conference. He was assigned the Nebraska episcopal area (the Nebraska Annual Conference). In 2000 Martinez was assigned the San Antonio Episcopal Area (the Rio Grande and Southwest Texas Annual Conferences).

One of Martinez's interests is fostering closer relationships between the U.M.C. and the Churches of Latin America and the Caribbean. Another goal is to visit Asia, and travel more extensively in Africa and Latin America.

Martinez also writes church history with an emphasis on the contributions of Hispanics to the ecumenical church.

== Selected writings ==
- Fiesta Cristiana (with Raquel Martinez), Nashville: Abingdon Press, 2003. ISBN 0-687-02159-6

== See also ==
- List of bishops of the United Methodist Church
