= James Bockelman =

American politician

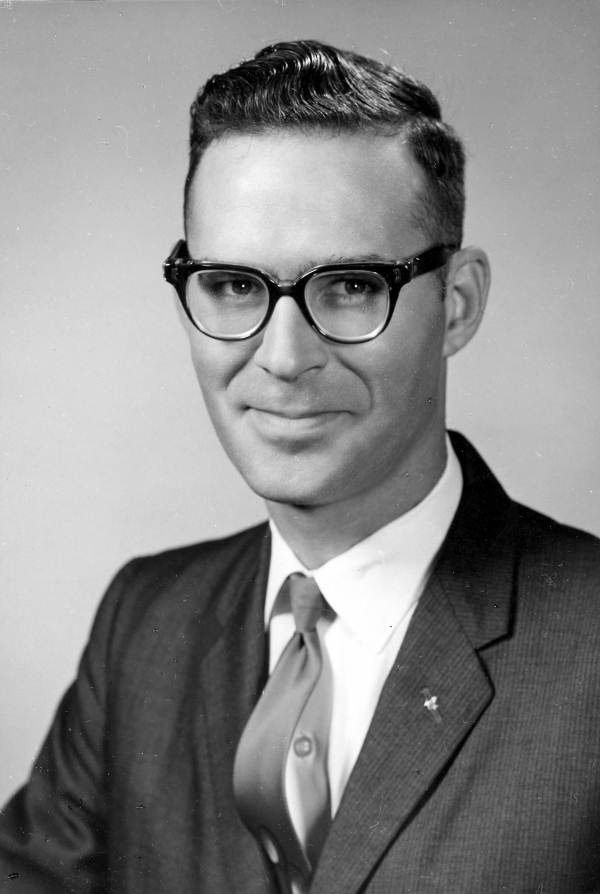
- Bockelman in 1966

Member of the Florida House of Representatives from Franklin County
- In office 1965–1966

Personal details
- Born: June 7, 1934 (age 92) Chicago, Illinois, U.S.
- Party: Democratic
- Education: Texas Western College (now UTEP)

James F. Bockelman (born June 7, 1934) is an American politician. He served as a Democratic member of the Florida House of Representatives. Bockelman was born in Chicago, Illinois. He attended Texas Western College. Bockelman served in the Florida House of Representatives from 1965 to 1966.
