= National Hispanic Leadership Agenda =

- Founded: 1991
- Founder: Henry Cisneros
- Headquarters: Washington, DC
- Website: nationalhispanicleadership.org

The National Hispanic Leadership Agenda (NHLA) is a non-profit leadership association. Established in 1991, the group consists of Hispanic leaders and national organizations throughout the United States. It is a nonpartisan organization that works to identify and analyze public policy issues affecting the Latino community.

== Member organizations ==
- ASPIRA Association, Inc.
- Cuban American National Council
- Hispanic Association of Colleges and Universities
- Hispanic Federation
- Hispanic National Bar Association
- Labor Council for Latin American Advancement
- League of United Latin American Citizens
- MANA, A National Latina Organization
- Mexican American Legal Defense and Educational Fund
- National Association of Hispanic Federal Executives
- National Association of Hispanic Publications
- National Association of Latino Elected and Appointed Officials
- National Conference of Puerto Rican Women
- National Council of La Raza
- National Hispana Leadership Institute
- National Hispanic Council on Aging
- National Hispanic Environmental Council
- National Hispanic Foundation for the Arts
- National Hispanic Caucus of State Legislators
- National Hispanic Media Coalition
- National Hispanic Medical Association
- National Institute for Latino Policy
- National Puerto Rican Coalition
- Self Reliance Foundation
- Southwest Voter Registration Education Project
- United States Hispanic Chamber of Commerce
- United States-Mexico Chamber of Commerce
- U.S. Hispanic Leadership Institute

== See also ==
- American GI Forum
- Congressional Hispanic Caucus
- Congressional Hispanic Conference
- National Hispanic Institute
