= Anna Panorska =

Polish mathematician

Anna Katarzyna Panorska is a Polish mathematician and statistician who works as a professor in the department of mathematics and statistics at the University of Nevada, Reno.

== Research ==
Panorska's research interests include studying extreme events in the stochastic processes used to model weather, water, and biology. She has also studied the effects of weather conditions on baseball performance, concluding that temperature has a larger effect than wind and humidity.

== Education and career ==
Panorska studied mathematics at the University of Warsaw, completing a degree in 1986. After earning a master's degree in statistics at the University of Texas at El Paso in 1988, she returned to mathematics for her doctoral studies, completing a Ph.D. at the University of California, Santa Barbara in 1992. Her dissertation, Generalized Convolutions, was supervised by Svetlozar Rachev.

She became an assistant professor of mathematics at the University of Tennessee at Chattanooga in 1992, but left academia in 1997 to work as a biostatistician for BlueCross BlueShield of Tennessee. After visiting the University of California, Santa Barbara in 1999–2000, she took a research faculty position in 2000 at the Desert Research Institute, associated with the University of Nevada, Reno. In 2002 she became a regular faculty member in mathematics and statistics at the university, and in 2011 she was promoted to full professor.
