= Norma Hernández =

American mathematics educator

Norma Eugenia González Hernández (née González, born May 19, 1934) is an American mathematics educator known for her work on the educational achievements of Mexican-American students and on the factors influencing those achievements. She was dean of education at the University of Texas at El Paso.

== Early life and education ==
Hernández was born on May 19, 1934, in El Paso, Texas, where her mother, Mexican-American writer and grocer Ramona González, had also been born and educated; her father was a sales clerk who had immigrated to the US from Zacatecas, Mexico. Both of her parents had a high school education, well-educated by the standards of Mexican Americans at the time. An aunt, living with them in El Paso, worked as a schoolteacher and principal in nearby Ciudad Juárez. She had three brothers and sisters, all of whom went on to professional careers. As a child, Hernández's talent in mathematics showed through her work making change at her mother's grocery. Although many public schools of that time and place segregated Mexican-Americans into poorer-quality education, Hernández was able to attend integrated schools. She earned many academic honors for her schoolwork, but was passed over for valedictorian in favor of a white male student whose overall record was not as accomplished.

She became a student at Texas Western College, which would later become the University of Texas at El Paso. She majored in mathematics there, and was the only female student in the advanced mathematics courses she took. She graduated in 1954 as "possibly one of the first American-born Latinas to receive a degree in mathematics from an accredited college in the United States", and in the same year married her husband, health scientist Rodolfo Hernández, with whom she had four daughters.

== Teaching career and graduate study ==
Hernández became an elementary school teacher in El Paso in 1955, and in 1957 moved to Austin, Texas, continuing as a teacher there for three years. In Austin, she earned a master's degree in mathematics from the University of Texas at Austin in 1960. Her master's thesis was An introduction to logic, sets, and mathematical systems. After this, she returned to El Paso, where she worked as supervisor of secondary mathematics until 1967.

Her next step was to return to graduate study at the University of Texas at Austin, as a doctoral student in mathematics education. She completed her Ph.D. in 1970, again possibly as a first for this degree for a Mexican-American woman. Her dissertation was An observation system to analyze cognitive content of teacher discourse in a mathematics lesson.

== Academic career and later life ==
Hernández took a position as assistant professor of education at the University of Texas at El Paso, starting in 1969. In 1974, the university named her dean of education, the first Hispanic alumna of the university to attain such a position. Under her leadership, in 1976, the university's program in education was accredited by the National Council for Accreditation of Teacher Education. She retired in 2000, becoming a professor emerita.

== Selected publications ==
- Hernández, Norma G. (March 1973), "Variables affecting achievement of middle school Mexican-American students", Review of Educational Research, 43 (1): 1–39, doi:10.3102/00346543043001001, S2CID 145394229
- Villarreal, Roberto E.; Hernández, Norma G.; Neighbor, Howard D., eds. (1988), Latino Empowerment: Progress, Problems, and Prospects, Contributions in Ethnic Studies, vol. 23, Greenwood Press
- Villarreal, Roberto E.; Hernández, Norma G., eds. (1991), Latinos and Political Coalitions: Political Empowerment for the 1990s, Praeger Publishers
- Secada, Walter G.; Ortiz-Franco, Luis; Hernandez, Norma G.; De La Cruz, Yolanda, eds. (1999), Changing the Faces of Mathematics: Perspectives on Latinos, National Council of Teachers of Mathematics
