= Monica Aissa Martinez =

Visual artist

Monica Aissa Martinez is an American visual artist.

== Early life and education ==
Monica Aissa Martinez was born and raised in El Paso, Texas. Anatomy, human and animal, is the focus of her work Martinez attended the University of Texas at El Paso and earned a master's degree in fine arts from New Mexico State University. Married to her husband in 1991, she moved to Phoenix where she currently lives and teaches drawing at Phoenix College. Soon after receiving her Master's, Martinez had her first solo exhibition at Scottsdale Center for the Arts, in the New Dimensions Galley.

== Exhibitions and permanent collections ==
Martinez's work was among that of 102 US artists whose work was selected for the exhibition "State of the Art: Discovering American Art Now," at the Crystal Bridges Museum of American Art in Bentonville, Arkansas.

Her work is in the permanent collection of Crystal Bridges Museum, the Tucson Museum of Art, New Mexico State University Art Museum among others.
