= Latino Commission on AIDS =

U.S. nonprofit organization

- Formation: 1990
- Location: 24 W 25th Street, 9th Floor, New York, NY 10010 US
- Region served: United States and its territories
- Key people: Dennis deLeon; Guillermo Chacon, President
- Website: www.latinoaids.org

The Latino Commission on AIDS (Spanish: La Comisión Latina sobre el SIDA) is an advocacy and service nonprofit membership organization formed in 1990 with a mission to combat the spread of HIV/AIDS in the Latino community in the United States of America including its territories. It is known for coordinating the National Latino AIDS Awareness Day.
