= Simone Vigod =

Canadian researcher and psychiatrist

Academic background
- Education: BSc, McGill University; MD, University of Toronto

Academic work
- Institutions: Women's College Hospital

Simone Natalie Vigod is a Canadian scientist, Professor and Labatt Family Chair of the Department of Psychiatry at the Temerty Faculty of Medicine, University of Toronto in Toronto, Ontario, Canada. She focuses her research on perinatal mood disorders and has conducted some of the largest studies worldwide on maternal mental illness around the time of pregnancy.

== Education and training ==
Vigod graduated from McGill University in 1999 with her Honours Bachelor of Science degree in Psychology. She then earned her medical degree from the University of Toronto, where she completed her psychiatric residency in 2009, and an MSc in Clinical Epidemiology in 2011.

== Career ==
Following her residency in psychiatry, Vigod joined Women's College Hospital to continue her research on reproductive health.

In 2014, Vigod became the program lead for Women's College Hospital's Reproductive Life Stages (RLS) program. The aim of the program was to provide care to women with mental health issues across their reproductive life cycle. Under her leadership, the team created and evaluated Mother Matters, an online therapist-facilitated support group for women across Ontario with postpartum mental health issues.

At the same time, she was also appointed the Shirley A. Brown Memorial Chair in Women’s Mental Health Research for a term of five years. In this role, Vigod collaborated with an international team of women’s mental health researchers to develop a primer on PPDs. In November 2018, Vigod was appointed the chief of psychiatry at Women’s College Hospital.

While serving in these leadership roles, Vigod developed an online patient decision aid to help women make choices about antidepressant use in pregnancy. In 2020, Vigod studied mental health support for mothers during the COVID-19 pandemic by looking at demographic data and mental health visits for more than 137,000 people in Ontario. Following this, she was named the winner of The Royal-Mach-Gaensslen Prize for Mental Health Research as an outstanding mental health researcher enabling future exploration and discovery.

She appears regularly in the media on maternal and pregnancy issues.

In 2025, Vigod was appointed Labatt Family Chair of Psychiatry at the University of Toronto, succeeding Dr. Benoit Mulsant, who had held the chair from 2015 to 2025. She continued her clinical and research work at Women's College Hospital while taking on the role, with her research focused on reducing disparities in mental health care, particularly for women across the lifespan and for diverse populations.

== Current positions ==
- Labatt Family Chair, Department of Psychiatry, University of Toronto
- Shirley A. Brown Memorial Chair in Women’s Mental Health Research and Senior Scientist, Women’s College Research Institute
- Professor, Department of Psychiatry, Temerty Faculty of Medicine, University of Toronto
- Senior Adjunct Scientist, ICES, Toronto, Ontario

== Awards and honours ==
- The Royal-Mach-Gaensslen Prize for Mental Health Research (2021)
- Shirley A. Brown Memorial Chair in Women's Mental Health Research (2018)
- Canadian Institutes for Health Research (CIHR), New Investigator Award (2015-2020)
- Ontario Mental Health Foundation New Investigator Award (2013-2016)
