= Brisa Sánchez =

Mexican-American biostatistician

Brisa N. Sánchez
- Education: University of Texas at El Paso; Harvard University
- Occupations: Biostatistician and Environmental Epidemiologist

Brisa N. Sánchez is a Mexican-American biostatistician and environmental epidemiologist, whose research has included work on the spatial analysis of fast food restaurants, on nutrition in schools, on the relation between the characteristics of neighborhoods and the health of their residents, on the water infrastructure in Mexico City, and on latent variable models in environmental statistics. She is the Dornsife Professor of Biostatistics at Drexel University.

== Education and career ==
Sánchez grew up on the Mexico–United States border, living in Puerto Palomas, Chihuahua but going to school across the border in nearby Deming, New Mexico. She majored in mathematics and minored in physics at the University of Texas at El Paso, where she graduated in 2000. Originally intending to become a mathematics teacher, she changed direction after attending a summer program in the mathematics of public health at Cornell University, directed by Carlos Castillo-Chavez, and then in 1999 presenting her research from the program at a conference of the Society for the Advancement of Chicanos/Hispanics and Native Americans in Science.

After continuing at the University of Texas at El Paso for a master's degree in statistics in 2001, she moved to Harvard University for graduate study in biostatistics, funded by a Howard Hughes Pre-doctoral Fellowship. She earned a second master's degree in 2003 and completed her Ph.D. in 2006. Her dissertation, Structural equation and latent variable models: fitting, diagnostics, and applications to environmental epidemiology, was supervised by Louise M. Ryan.

She joined the University of Michigan faculty in 2006 as an assistant research professor, became a regular-rank assistant professor in 2008, and was named John G. Searle assistant professor in 2012. She was promoted to associate professor in 2013 and to full professor in 2018. In 2019, she moved to Drexel University as Dornsife Professor. She has worked as a staff member for the Biostatistics for Social Impact Collaboratory.

== Recognition ==
In 2020 Sánchez was named a Fellow of the American Statistical Association.
