= Héctor Arenas Sánchez =

Mexican politician

- Born: 15 April 1964 (age 62); State of Mexico, Mexico
- Occupation: Politician
- Political party: PRD

Héctor Arenas Sánchez (born 15 April 1964) is a Mexican politician from the Party of the Democratic Revolution. In 2009 he served as Deputy of the LX Legislature of the Mexican Congress representing the State of Mexico.
