= Julio E. Rubio =

Mexican researcher

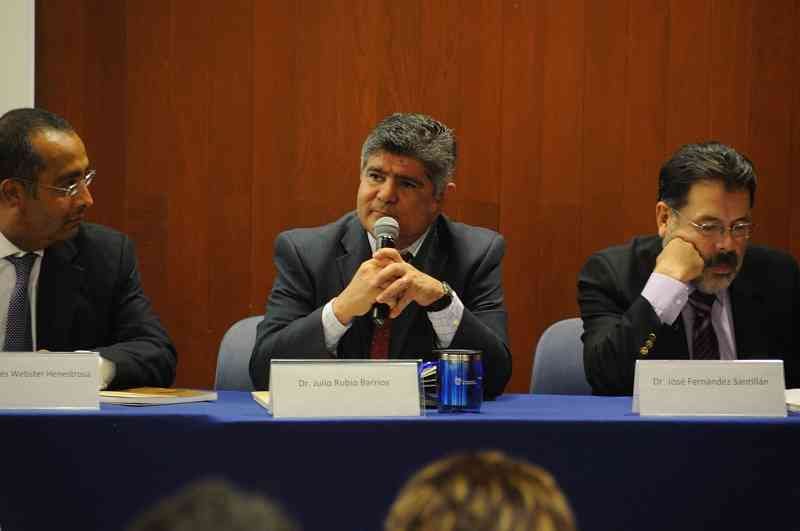
- Rubio Barrios en el Programa Sectorial de Cultura 2011-2016 del Estado de Oaxaca en ITESM-Campus Ciudad de Mexico
- Born: Tijuana, Mexico
- Education: PhD in Philosophy of Science
- Occupations: researcher, administrator
- Known for: research in epistemology of natural science, systems theory, and sociology of technology

Julio Ernesto Rubio Barrios is a Mexican researcher and administrator at Monterrey Institute of Technology and Higher Education.

== Academic recognition ==
Rubio is a Level I member of Mexico's National System of Researchers (SNI).

In 2009, Rubio was accepted as a member of the National Thematic Research Network on Science, Complexity and Society, Mexico.

== Education ==
Rubio received his PhD from the University of Valencia in 1999. He graduated cum laude, the highest distinction in Spain, for this dissertation The Construction of Scientific Knowledge: The Case for the Concept of Genetic Information (La construcción del conocimiento científico: el caso del concepto de información genética). In this work, Rubio argues that scientific knowledge is generated by communication systems that are distinguished by codes of formalization and interpretation of reality.

Rubio earned an MA in Philosophy of Science from the Metropolitan Autonomous University (UAM), Mexico. His thesis subject was Reductionism and Emergentism in the Hypercycle Theory (Reduccionismo y emergentismo en la teoría del hiperciclo).

Rubio has also earned MS in Physics from the University of Texas at El Paso. Finally, Rubio earned with honorable mentions an Electronics and Communications Engineering Degree from the Monterrey Institute of Technology and Higher Education.

== Research interests and contributions ==
As a researcher, Rubio's fields of interest include epistemology of natural science, systems theory, and sociology of technology, generally focusing on the topics of scientific and technological innovation. He has written numerous works on these topics, including articles in both peer-reviewed and public interest journals. He has edited a book on these subjects, and is working on two more. He also wrote the prologue of the book Science, Technology and History (Ciencia, tecnología e historia) by the scholar Javier Ordoñez.

Rubio has also applied the triple helix approach to the subject of patents. According to Rubio, the lack of nationally developed patents in Mexico is a sign of weakness and technological dependence. In order to increase the number and quality of patents developed in Mexico, Mexico must focus on building a stable knowledge society. In order to do so, it is important for Mexico to develop a national innovation system, in which business, academia and government work in concert. In particular, universities must own their role as producers of knowledge. Government also needs to increase incentives for patent production. For instance, the SNI should take patent development into account in evaluation a researcher's academic contributions. Seed funding is also essential, as patents lead to the development of new businesses, which in turn further the innovation process.

Rubio has argued that the lack of cooperation between government, academia and industry is not specific to patents production, but rather of the overall state of affairs in Mexico. According to Rubio, a dynamic economy is built on stable structures, without which optimal employment levels are impossible. As such, in Mexico, there is the paradoxical state of affairs that in Mexico these is a lack of human capital, even though trained professional are available in increasing numbers.

Rubio's book Science, Technology and Society in Mexico (Ciencia, tecnología y sociedad en México) is held by research libraries across the world, including in Mexico, Germany and Spain.

== Administrative experience ==
Rubio is currently the director of the School of Humanities and Social Science of ITESM Campus Ciudad de México. He was previously dean of academics of the Rectoría de la Zona Metropolitana de la Ciudad de México (RZMCM) of Tecnológico de Monterrey and Dean of Research of the RZMCM. He has also served as head of Tecnológico de Monterrey's Mexico City and Santa Fe campuses.

Rubio has also served on the board of directors of the Mexican Council of Graduate Studies (COMEPO). More than 60 Mexican research universities are current COMEPO members, including the National Autonomous University of Mexico (UNAM), the Metropolitan Autonomous University (UAM) and the National Polytechnic Institute (IPN).

== Books and chapters in books ==
- Rubio, J. E. & Molina, A. (Eds.). (In progress). La tecnología del siglo XXI [Technology in the 21st century].
- Rubio, J. E. (2011). The public debate on science and technology: Transgenic corn in Mexico. In P. Kalantzis-Cope & K. Gherab Martin (Eds.), Emerging digital spaces in contemporary society: Properties of technology (pp. 198–200). New York: Palgrave Macmillan.
- Rubio, J. E. (2010). La construcción comunicacional del concepto de información genética [The communication construction of the concept of genetic information]. In J. Serrano (Ed.), Ciencia, tecnología y sociedad. Mexico City: McGraw-Hill.
- Rubio, J. E. (2010). Prologue. In J. Ordoñez (Ed.), Ciencia, tecnología e historia: relaciones y diferencias [Science, technology and history: connections and differences]. Mexico City: Ariel.
- Rubio, J. E., & Ordoñez Rodriguez, F. J. (Eds.) (2008). Ciencia, tecnología y sociedad en México [Science, technology and society in Mexico]. Mexico City: Miguel Ángel Porrúa.
- Rubio, J. E. (2008). La sociedad mexicana ante la ciencia [Mexican society in light of science]. In J. Rubio & J. Ordóñez (Eds.). Ciencia, tecnología y sociedad en Mexico. Mexico City: Miguel Ángel Porrúa. ISBN 978-970-819-094-7.
- Rubio, J. E. & Juárez, I. (2008). Redes de investigación en Mexico [Research networks in Mexico]. In Gestión de recursos para la investigación. Mexico City: Federation of Private Mexican Institutions of Higher Education.
- Rubio, J. E. (2005). La organización social de la ciencia en México [Social organization of science in Mexico]. In L. Corona Treviño & F. X. Paunero Amigo (Eds.), Ciencia, tecnología e innovación: algunas experiencias en América Latina y el Caribe. Girona, Spain: Universitat de Girona.
- Rubio, J. E. (2002). La ciencia en la globalización [Science and globalization]. In K. M. Kamilamba (Ed.), La globalización vista desde la periferia. Mexico City: Miguel Ángel Porrúa.

== Journal articles ==
- Rubio, J. E. (2009). El surgimiento de la biología molecular [The emergence of molecular biology]. Ciencia UANL, 7(3), 135–142.
- Rubio, J. E. (2004). A systemic typology of scientific phenomena. Analecta Husserliana, 83(6), 673–700.
- Rubio, J. E. (2003). Systems as emergent phenomena. Analecta Husserliana, 79, 845–864.
- Rubio, J. E. (2001). Phenomenology and levels of organization in science. Analecta Husserliana, 76, 221–230.
- Rubio, J. E. (1999). Autonomía epistemológica de los niveles de organización [Epistemological autonomy in levels of organization]. Ludus Vitalis, Revista de Filosofía de las Ciencias de la Vida, 7(12).
- Rubio, J. E. (1998). Lenguaje y comunicación en la ciencia [Language and communication in science]. Razón y Palabra, 3(12).
- Rubio, J. E. (1997). Reducción fisicalista del origen de la vida en la teoría del hiperciclo [Physicalist reductionism of the origin of life in the hypercycle theory]. Ludus Vitalis, Revista de Filosofía de las Ciencias de la Vida, 5(9).
- Rubio, J. E. (1997). Aproximación ecológica y reduccionismo genético en el origen molecular de la vida [The ecological approach and genetic reductionism in the molecular origin of life]. Ludus Vitalis, Revista de Filosofía de las Ciencias de la Vida, special num. 2, 381–394.

== See also ==
- List of Monterrey Institute of Technology and Higher Education faculty
