= Mi Familia Vota =

U.S. Latino political organization

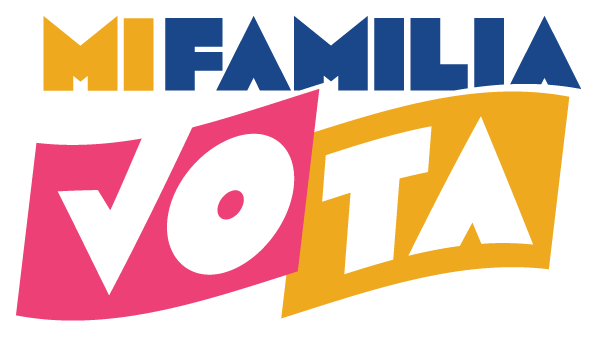
- Purpose: Get out the vote Voting rights Voter registration Civic engagement Advocacy; Polling
- Headquarters: Phoenix, AZ
- Website: www.mifamiliavota.org

Mi Familia Vota (Spanish for "My Family Votes") is a national Latino voting organization in the United States. While known for its voter turnout work, the organization expanded into issues advocacy as well. The organizations says it wants to have more of a two-way dialogue with voters and elected officials. The organization also conducts polling.

The organization is based in Phoenix and has field offices in 10 states.

== Activities ==
=== Outreach ===
In 2020, the organization focused its outreach to voters in Arizona, California, Colorado, Florida, Michigan, Nevada, Pennsylvania, Texas and Wisconsin.

As of 2024, the organization oversees some of the largest Latino voter mobilization groups in the country. The organization also created its own chatbot that uses AI to have human-sounding bilingual conversations with voters on platforms like WhatsApp.

=== Lawsuits ===
Mi Familia Vota led a coalition of civil rights organizations with the US Department of Justice to sue Arizona over a 2022 law passed by its legislature that tried to bar voters who had not provided proof of citizenship when they registered. On June 29, 2026, the Supreme Court granted certiorari in the case.

== See also ==
- League of United Latino American Citizens
