= Roger V. Gonzalez =

American professor of engineering education

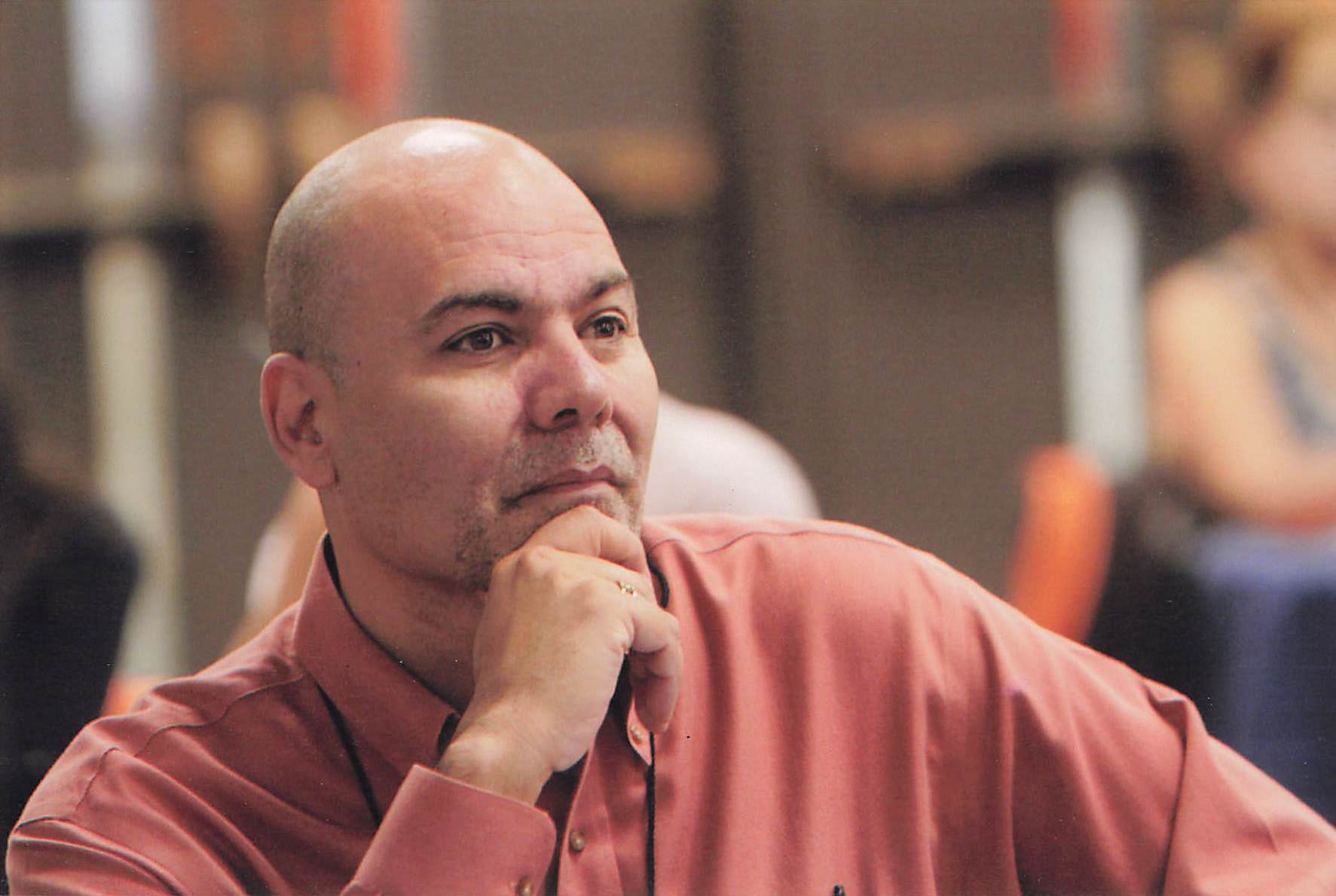
- Born: El Paso, Texas
- Education: University of Texas at El Paso and University of Texas at Austin
- Awards: Fellow of the American Society of Mechanical Engineers, 2016 Fellow of the Institute for Medical and Biological Engineers, 2015
- Scientific career
- Fields: Mechanical & Biomedical Engineering
- Workplaces: University of Texas at El Paso

Roger V. Gonzalez (born in El Paso, TX) is the Mike Loya Endowed Chair in Engineering and Chair and Professor of the Engineering Education and Leadership Department at the University of Texas at El Paso (UTEP).

== Education ==
Gonzalez completed post-doctorate fellowship at the Rehabilitation Institute of Chicago and Northwestern Medical School.

== Awards and honors ==
- Fellow of the American Institute for Medical and Biological Engineering

== Selected publications ==
Gonzalez has been authoring publications from 1990–2023 on engineering.

- Galey, Lucas; Beckmann, Guillermo; Ramos, Ethan; Rangel, Frances A.; Gonzalez, Roger V. (2023-10-12). "Optimization of a Cost-Constrained, Hydraulic Knee Prosthesis Using a Kinematic Analysis Model". Biomechanics. 3 (4): 493–510. doi:10.3390/biomechanics3040040. ISSN 2673-7078.
- Green, Joshua T.; Rybak, Ian A.; Slager, Jonathan J.; Lopez, Mauricio; Chanoi, Zachary; Stewart, Calvin M.; Gonzalez, Roger V. (December 2023). "Local composition control using an active-mixing hotend in fused filament fabrication". Additive Manufacturing Letters. 7 100177. doi:10.1016/j.addlet.2023.100177.
- Galey, Lucas; Gonzalez, Roger V. (2022-02-10). "Design and Initial Evaluation of a Low-Cost Microprocessor-Controlled Above-Knee Prosthesis: A Case Report of 2 Patients". Prosthesis. 4 (1): 60–72. doi:10.3390/prosthesis4010007. ISSN 2673-1592.
- Wilson, S.; Hausselle, J.; Guess, T.M.; Gonzalez, R.V. (2019-04-26). "Rigid-body modeling of knee cartilage and meniscus using experimental pressure-strain curves". Computer Methods in Biomechanics and Biomedical Engineering. 22 (6): 574–584. doi:10.1080/10255842.2019.1569639. ISSN 1025-5842. PMID 30821502. S2CID 73495276.
- Green, Joshua T.; Hale, Rena F.; Hausselle, Jerome; Gonzalez, Roger V. (2017-12-01). "A Reconfigurable Multiplanar In Vitro Simulator for Real-Time Absolute Motion With External and Musculotendon Forces". Journal of Biomechanical Engineering. 139 (12). doi:10.1115/1.4037853. ISSN 0148-0731. PMID 28877307.
- "Leadership in Engineering Innovation and Entrepreneurship, 2021 ASEE Virtual Annual Conference". 26 July 2021.

== Philanthropic efforts ==
Gonzalez is a founder of and former CEO of LIMBS International, which started in 2004 (via LEGS at LeTourneau University).
