= Labor Council for Latin American Advancement =

US nonprofit organization

LCLAA
- Labor Council for Latin American Advancement

- Farmworker protesting on Solidarity Day, 1981
- Founded: 1972
- Headquarters: Washington, D.C.
- Location: United States
- Key people: Yanira Merino, National President; Karla Pineda, Deputy Director
- Affiliations: AFL-CIO, National Hispanic Leadership Agenda
- Website: www.lclaa.org

The Labor Council for Latin American Advancement (LCLAA) is a nonprofit, nonpartisan Latino organization affiliated with the AFL-CIO and the Change to Win federation. It was founded in 1972 to provide Latino trade union members in the United States with a more effective voice within the AFL-CIO, to encourage Latino participation in the democratic process, and to encourage the organization of Latino workers into labor unions.

LCLAA is the voice of Latinos within the AFL-CIO, and one of seven official constituency groups within the organization. It is based at AFL-CIO headquarters in Washington, D.C. LCLAA has 26 chapters in the United States and Puerto Rico, and represents millions of Latino trade unionists.

== History ==
LCLAA was founded in 1972 as part of a wave of constituency group organizing within the AFL-CIO. The AFL-CIO had chartered its first retiree organization, the National Council of Senior Citizens (NCSC), in 1962 and a civil rights organization called the A. Philip Randolph Institute in 1965. The Coalition of Black Trade Unionists followed in 1972 to give a broader, more effective voice within the AFL-CIO to black workers, and the Coalition of Labor Union Women was chartered in 1974. But it was the large influx of Latino workers brought about by the chartering of the United Farm Workers in 1966 that led to a push by Latino labor union activists for a separate organization of their own.

Several years passed, however, before the growing militancy and political muscle of the emerging Latino movement moved AFL-CIO president George Meany to agree to a Latino constituency group. In 1972 the AFL-CIO brought together hundreds of Latino labor activists and members of local Latino labor committees to form LCLAA. The organization's founding conference was held in Washington, D.C., on November 16, 1973. LCLAA's first president was Ray Mendoza, a member of the Laborers' International Union of North America.

== Goals and programs ==
LCLAA has three primary goals. The first is to work with unions and community groups to organize Latino workers into unions. The second is to advance the social, economic, political, and civil rights of Latinos by building coalitions with and among other unions and other national groups. The third goal is to promote Latinos' participation in the American democratic process.

LCLAA engages in a wide variety of projects in the furtherance of these goals. It has a significant lobbying and legislative presence in Washington, D.C., and coordinates the work of state-level legislative work on certain issues such as immigrant rights and access to social services. LCLAA also conducts research on a number of policy issues affecting Latinos and non-citizen immigrant workers (whether Latino or not). It is currently very active in the U.S. immigration policy debate. LCLAA also conducts voter registration, education, and mobilization efforts throughout each election cycle.

== Structure ==
LCLAA is governed by its members in accordance with the constitutions of the LCLAA and AFL-CIO. Membership is open to any union member, active or retired. The membership meets biannually in even-numbered years (a policy and education conference is held in even-numbered years.) representatives to the national meeting are elected by local LCLAA chapters, international unions, AFL-CIO state federations, certain large AFL-CIO central labor councils and certain qualifying local AFL-CIO unions on the basis of a complex yet proportional representation formula.

=== Leadership ===
The membership elects nine national officers. The officers include a president, secretary-treasurer, executive vice president, and six vice presidents to four-year terms.

The membership also elects an executive board of 36 members to four-year terms as well. In addition to the elected members, the nine officers of the organization also automatically sit on the board. The board governs the affairs of LCLAA between membership meetings. It meets at least once a year, although it may meet more often than that, and may also make organizational or structural changes in the organization during the period between membership meetings.

The officers recommend, and the executive board approves, the appointment of an Advisory Board. The duties of the Advisory Board, however, are not spelled out in the LCLAA constitution.

LCLAA may establish, at its discretion, state and local councils. These councils are required to affiliate with their respective state and local AFL-CIO bodies. State and local councils do not exist in all areas, however, and the LCLAA constitution provides for at-large membership where they do not.

In 2018 the following were elected officers of LCLAA: Yanira Merino, a member of the Laborers' International Union of North America (LiUNA), President; Aida Garcia, a member of the Service Employees International Union, Executive Vice President; and in 2020 Evelyn DeJesus, a member of the American Federation of Teachers, was appointed Secretary-Treasurer. In 2020 Jose Vargas became LCLAA's Executive Director. Merino is the first woman and first immigrant to serve as President of LCLAA.

In 2014, LCLAA held its 20th National Membership Convention in Houston, Texas, the following were elected officers of LCLAA:

- National President: Milton Rosado, United Auto Workers
- Executive Vice President: Aida Garcia, Service Employees International Union
- Secretary-Treasurer: Jose Vargas, American Federation of Teachers

Current Board members

- National President: Yanira Merino, Laborers' International Union of North America
- Executive Vice President: Aida Garcia, Service Employees International Union
- Secretary Treasurer: Evelyn DeJesus, American Federation of Teachers
- Vice President: Gary Allen, International Association of Machinists and Aerospace Workers
- Vice President: Jorge Rodriguez, United Automobile Workers
- Vice President: Guillermo Perez, United Steelworkers Union
- Vice President: Robert Martinez, International Association of Machinists and Aerospace Workers
- Vice President: Johnny Rodriguez, United Food and Commercial Workers
- Vice President: Sergio Rascon, Laborers' International Union of North America

Unions Represented on LCLAA's National Executive Board:

- AFL–CIO
- American Federation of Government Employees
- American Federation of State, County and Municipal Employees
- American Federation of Teachers
- Amalgamated Transit Union
- Communications Workers of America
- International Association of Machinists and Aerospace Workers
- International Brotherhood of Electrical Workers
- International Union of Bricklayers and Allied Craftworkers
- International Union of Operating Engineers
- International Union of Painters and Allied Trades
- Laborers' International Union of North America
- National Education Association
- Office and Professional Employees International Union
- Service Employees International Union
- Transport Workers Union of America
- United Association
- United Auto Workers
- United Food and Commercial Workers
- United Mine Workers
- United Steelworkers
