= 2017 El Paso mayoral election =

Election

El Paso mayoral election, 2017
- May 6, 2017 (general); June 10, 2017 (runoff)
- Turnout: 7.86% (general); 8.26% (runoff)
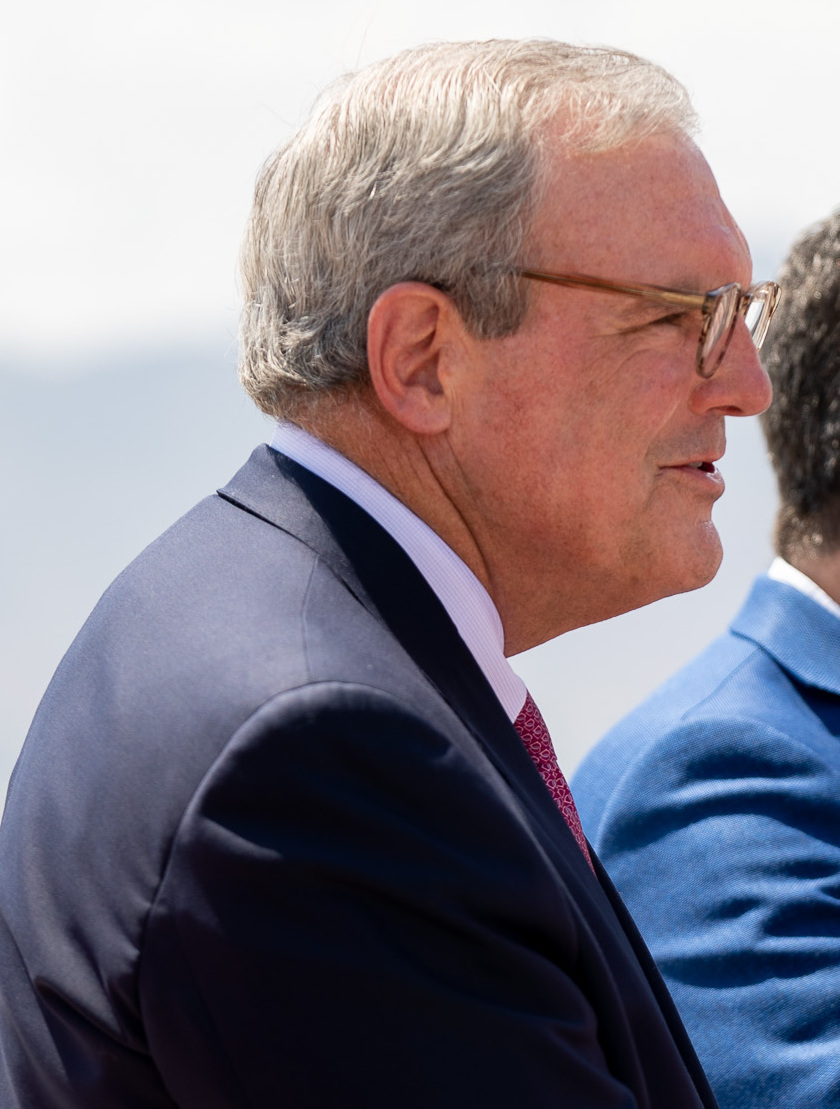

Candidate	Dee Margo	David Saucedo	Emma Acosta
Party	Nonpartisan	Nonpartisan	Nonpartisan
General	14,915	7,883	5,239
Runoff	17,148	12,937	Eliminated
Mayor before election
Oscar Leeser
Democratic
Elected mayor
Dee Margo
Republican

The 2017 El Paso mayoral election took place on May 6, 2017, alongside elections for El Paso's city council. As none of the candidates received a majority of the total votes, a runoff election was held on June 10, 2017.

While elections in El Paso are officially non-partisan, candidates often publicize their party affiliation. Incumbent Democratic mayor Oscar Leeser declined to seek re-election and endorsed Dee Margo, a former Republican member of the Texas House of Representatives, who went on to win the election.

== General election ==
=== Candidates ===
==== Advanced to runoff ====
- Dee Margo, former state representative
- David Saucedo, small business owner

==== Eliminated ====
- Emma Acosta, former city council representative (2008–2017)
- Jorge Artalejo, perennial candidate
- Willie Cager, former UTEP basketballer
- Elisa Morales, health science researcher and legislative aide to Senator Tom Udall
- Jaime Perez, perennial candidate
- Charles Stapler, member of the El Paso County Historical Commission board

==== Declined ====
- Estela Casas, KVIA news anchor
- Oscar Leeser, incumbent mayor
- Cortney Niland, former city council representative (2011–2017)
- Emma Schwartz, president and CEO of the Medical Center of the Americas Foundation
- Joe Wardy, former mayor of El Paso (2003–2005)

=== Endorsements ===
Dee Margo

State legislators

- Marisa Marquez, former state representative from the 77th district (2009–2017) (Democratic)

=== Results ===
El Paso mayoral election results, 2017
Party	Candidate	Votes	%
Nonpartisan	Dee Margo	14,915	45.32%
Nonpartisan	David Saucedo	7,883	23.95%
Nonpartisan	Emma Acosta	5,239	15.92%
Nonpartisan	Elisa Morales	1,845	5.61%
Nonpartisan	Willie Cager	1,388	4.22%
Nonpartisan	Jaime Perez	950	2.89%
Nonpartisan	Charlie Stapler	412	1.25%
Nonpartisan	Jorge Artalejo	280	0.85%
Total votes		32,912	100%

== Runoff ==
=== Campaign ===
Although mayoral elections in El Paso are officially nonpartisan, both of the 2017 runoff candidates were associated with the Republican Party. El Paso traditionally leans Democratic, and some Democratic Party leaders emphasized the option of not voting in the mayoral race. "Both [Dee Margo and David Saucedo] are Republican and don't hold the same values as Democratic values," El Paso County Democratic Party Chair Iliana Holguin said. "We are trying to inform people and educate them that there is a third option [of not voting in the mayoral race]."

=== Endorsements ===
Dee Margo

State legislators

- Marisa Marquez, former state representative from the 77th district (2009–2017) (Democratic)

Local officials

- Oscar Leeser, mayor of El Paso (2013–2017, 2021–2025) (Democratic)
- Emma Acosta, city councilor from the 3rd district (2008–2017)
- Michiel Noe, city councilor from the 5th district (2011–2019) (Democratic)
- Claudia Ordaz, city councilor from the 6th district (2014–2019) (Democratic) (Note: Ordaz has since been elected to the Texas House of Representatives, but was still a councilor at the time of the 2017 mayoral election.)
- Peter Svarzbein, city councilor from the 1st district (2015–2023)
- Jim Tolbert, city councilor from the 2nd district (2016–2017) (Democratic)
- Henry Rivera, city councilor from the 7th district (2017–2025)
David Saucedo

Labor unions

- El Paso Municipal Police Officers Association
- El Paso County Sheriffs Association

=== Results ===
2017 El Paso mayoral election results
Party	Candidate	Votes	%
Nonpartisan	Dee Margo	17,148	56.99%
Nonpartisan	David Saucedo	12,937	43.01%
Total votes		30,085	100%
