= 2020 El Paso mayoral election =

- November 3, 2020; December 12, 2020 (runoff)
- Turnout: 55.1% general 13.1% runoff
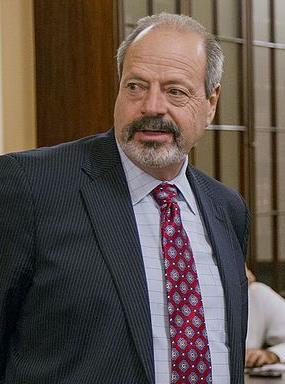

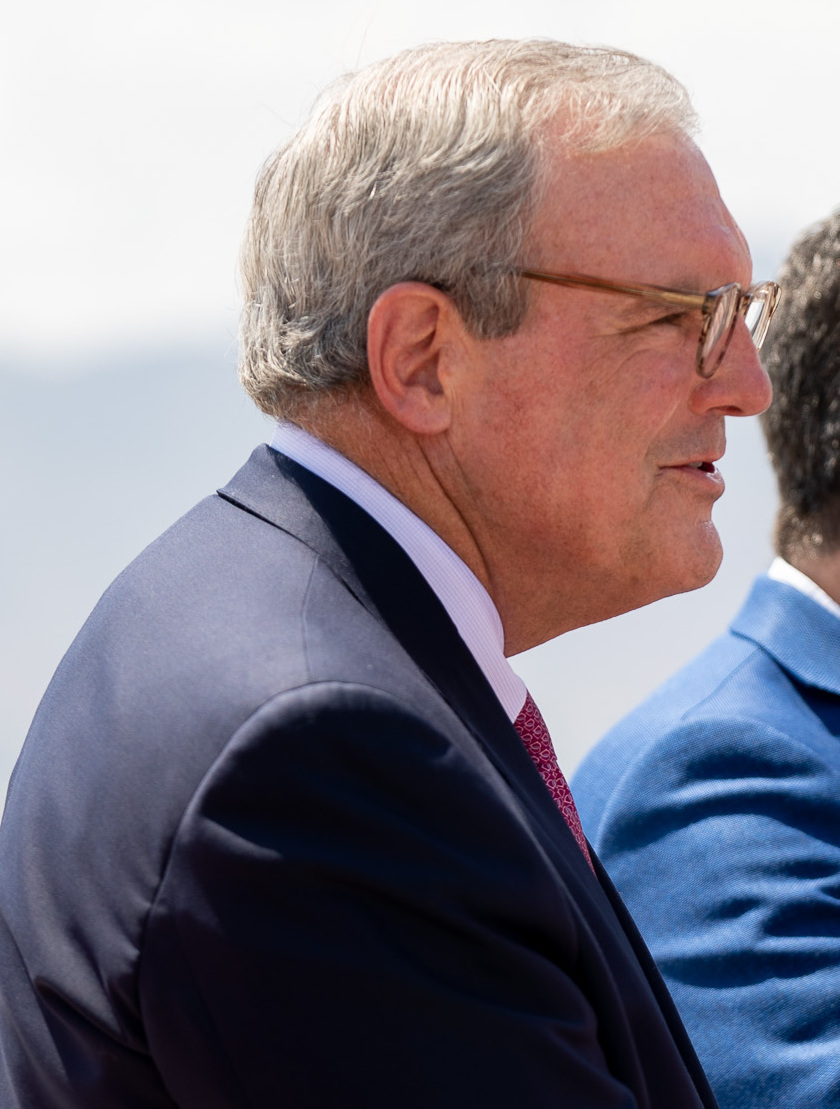

Candidate	Oscar Leeser	Dee Margo
Party	Nonpartisan	Nonpartisan
General	92,700 (42.62%)	53,606 (24.65%)
Runoff	42,895 (79.54%)	11,034 (20.46%)
Candidate	Veronica Carbajal	Carlos Gallinar
Party	Nonpartisan	Nonpartisan
General	47,299 (21.75%)	16,197 (7.45%)
Runoff	Eliminated	Eliminated
Mayor before election
Dee Margo
Republican
Elected mayor
Oscar Leeser
Democratic

The 2020 El Paso mayoral election took place on November 3, 2020, to elect the mayor of El Paso, Texas. It was held alongside elections for El Paso's city council and county sheriff.

== General election ==
=== Candidates ===
==== Advanced to runoff ====
- Oscar Leeser, former mayor
- Dee Margo, incumbent mayor and former state representative

==== Eliminated ====
- Veronica Carbajal, attorney (later endorsed Leeser)
- Carlos Gallinar, former city government official (later endorsed Leeser)
- Dean Martinez, veteran
- Calvin Zielsdorf, paramedic and high school swimming coach

=== Endorsements ===
Oscar Leeser

State legislators

- José Rodríguez, former minority leader of the Texas Senate (2015–2020) from the 29th district (2011–2021) (previously endorsed Carbajal)

Party officials

- Gilberto Hinojosa, former chair of the Texas Democratic Party (2012–2025)

Political parties

- Texas Democratic Party
Carlos Gallinar

U.S. representatives

- Beto O'Rourke, former TX–16 (2013–2019)
Veronica Carbajal

State legislators

- José Rodríguez, former minority leader of the Texas Senate (2015–2020) from the 29th district (2011–2021) (later endorsed Leeser)
Declined to endorse

Newspapers

- El Paso Times

=== Results ===
2020 El Paso mayoral election
Party	Candidate	Votes	%
Nonpartisan	Oscar Leeser	92,700	42.62%
Nonpartisan	Dee Margo (incumbent)	53,606	24.65%
Nonpartisan	Veronica Carbajal	47,299	21.75%
Nonpartisan	Carlos Gallinar	16,197	7.45%
Nonpartisan	Dean Martinez	4,233	1.95%
Nonpartisan	Calvin Zielsdorf	3,449	1.59%
Total votes		217,484	100.00%

== Runoff ==
=== Campaign ===
The 2020 runoff election was "dominated by Margo's management of the COVID-19 crisis." According to the Texas Tribune, "Margo ran on his experience guiding the city through three major crises — not just the pandemic, but also the 2019 massacre at a Walmart and the Central American migrant influx prior to that," while Leeser "pitched himself as a better crisis manager who would do more to bring the city together to get the virus under control."

Margo's campaign regularly compared his time in office to Leeser's, claiming among other things that he had resurfaced more streets, created more jobs, and incurred less debt. A Margo campaign ad stated, "Texas Rangers investigated Leeser for allegations he violated state ethics laws. And Leeser raised taxes twice, grew city debt by hundreds of millions, and neglected first responders who helped us during COVID."

A Leeser campaign ad said Margo had ignored his own COVID guidelines, contributed to 32,000 El Pasoans losing their jobs, and claimed that Hispanic people were hospitalized at higher rates than 'normal Caucasians.'

=== Results ===
2020 El Paso mayoral runoff election
Party	Candidate	Votes	%
Nonpartisan	Oscar Leeser	42,895	79.54%
Nonpartisan	Dee Margo (incumbent)	6,301	20.46%
Total votes		53,929	100.00%
