= 2020 El Paso elections =

- November 3, 2020

On November 3, 2020 El Paso County elected the mayor of El Paso, Texas, four members of city council (districts 2, 3, 4, and 7), two county commissioners, county sheriff, state senator, and five state representatives. El Pasoans voted for members of the House of Representatives of the United States from the 16th and 23rd districts of Texas, district attorney (which also represents Hudspeth and Culberson counties), United States senator, and president of the United States.

The city elections (for mayor and council) are non-partisan, and therefore have no primary election. However, if no candidate wins a majority there will be a run-off election.

== Mayor ==
2020 El Paso mayoral election
Party	Candidate	Votes	%
Nonpartisan	Oscar Leeser	92,700	42.62%
Nonpartisan	Dee Margo (incumbent)	53,606	24.65%
Nonpartisan	Veronica Carbajal	47,299	21.75%
Nonpartisan	Carlos Gallinar	16,197	7.45%
Nonpartisan	Dean Martinez	4,233	1.95%
Nonpartisan	Calvin Zielsdorf	3,449	1.59%
Total votes		217,484	100.00%

2020 El Paso mayoral election
- November 3, 2020; December 12, 2020 (runoff)
- Turnout: 55.1% general 13.1% runoff
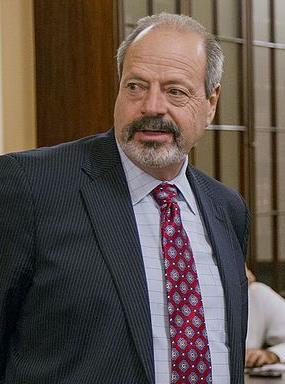

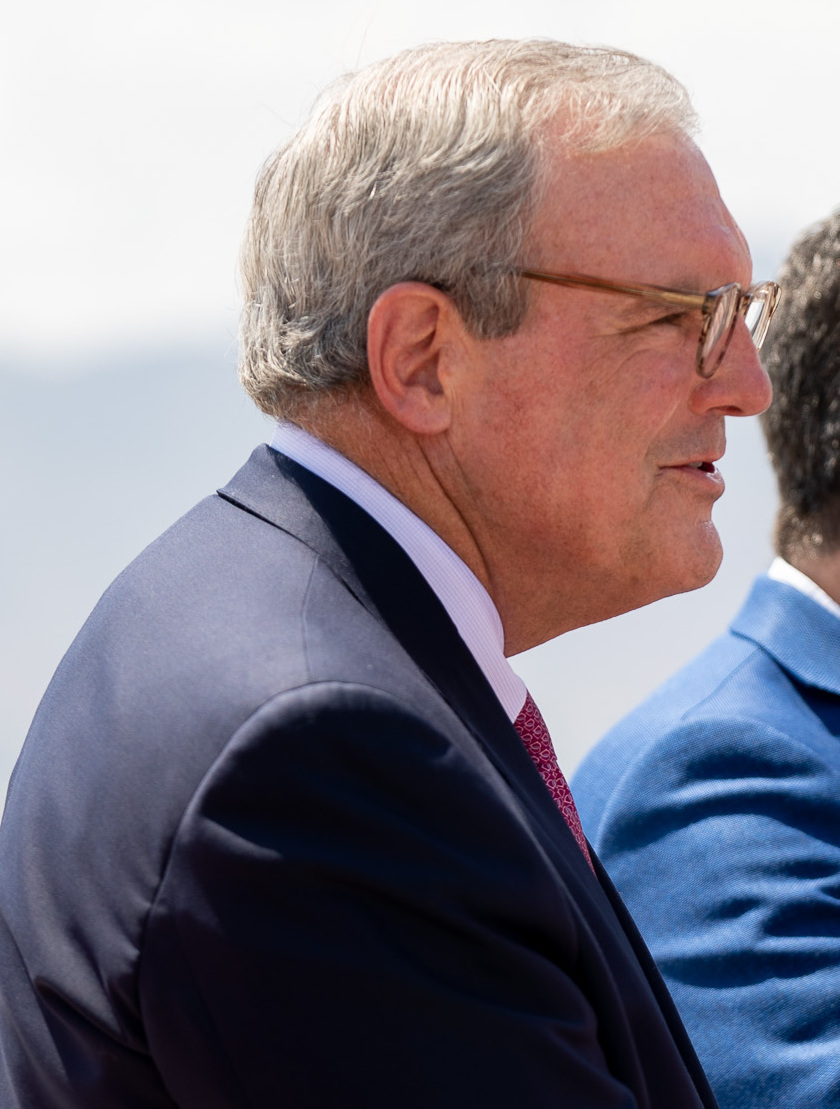
Candidate	Oscar Leeser	Dee Margo
Party	Nonpartisan	Nonpartisan
First round vote	92,700	53,606
First round percentage	42.62%	24.65%
Runoff vote	42,895	11,034
Runoff percentage	79.54%	20.46%
Candidate	Veronica Carbajal	Carlos Gallinar
Party	Nonpartisan	Nonpartisan
First round vote	47,299	16,197
First round percentage	21.75%	7.45%
Mayor before election
Dee Margo
Republican
Elected mayor
Oscar Leeser
Democratic

=== Runoff results ===
2020 El Paso mayoral runoff election
Party	Candidate	Votes	%
Nonpartisan	Oscar Leeser	42,895	79.54%
Nonpartisan	Dee Margo (incumbent)	6,301	20.46%
Total votes		53,929	100.00%

== City council elections ==
=== District 2 ===
District 2 incumbent Alexsandra Annello won re-election for a second term in the December runoff election.

=== First round results ===
2020 El Paso City Council District 2
Party	Candidate	Votes	%
Nonpartisan	Judy Gutierrez	8,416	47.1
Nonpartisan	Alexsandra Annello (incumbent)	6,618	37.0
Nonpartisan	James Campos	2,844	15.9
Total votes		17,878	100.0

=== Runoff results ===
2020 El Paso City Council District 2
Party	Candidate	Votes	%
Nonpartisan	Alexsandra Annello (incumbent)	2,901	51.9
Nonpartisan	Judy Gutierrez	2,692	48.1
Total votes		5,593	100.0

=== District 3 ===
District 3 incumbent Cassandra Hernandez-Brown was re-elected to a second term.

2020 El Paso City Council District 3
Party	Candidate	Votes	%
Nonpartisan	Cassandra Hernandez-Brown (incumbent)	13,192	54.0
Nonpartisan	Jose L. Rodriguez	7,483	30.6
Nonpartisan	William Veliz	3,741	15.3
Total votes		24,416	100.0

=== District 4 ===
District 4 incumbent Sam Morgan lost re-election in a December runoff to Joe Molinar.

2020 El Paso City Council District 4
Party	Candidate	Votes	%
Nonpartisan	Sam Morgan (Incumbent)	8,365	32.2
Nonpartisan	Joe Molinar	7,345	28.3
Nonpartisan	Dorothy Byrd	6,108	23.5
Nonpartisan	Wesley Lawrence	2,727	10.5
Nonpartisan	Shawn Nixon	1,401	5.4
Total votes		25,946	100.0

=== Runoff results ===
2020 El Paso City Council District 4
Party	Candidate	Votes	%
Nonpartisan	Joe Molinar	3,853	53.9
Nonpartisan	Sam Morgan (Incumbent)	3,295	46.1
Total votes		7,148	100.0

=== District 7 ===
District 7 incumbent Henry Rivera was re-elected to a second term.

2020 El Paso City Council District 3
Party	Candidate	Votes	%
Nonpartisan	Henry Rivera (incumbent)	13,325	56.9
Nonpartisan	Aaron Montes	10,076	43.1
Total votes		23,401	100.0

== County sheriff ==
The incumbent Sheriff, Richard Wiles, won the Democratic primary. Because no other candidate challenged him, he was automatically re-elected.

=== Democratic ===
2020 El Paso City Council District 3
Party	Candidate	Votes	%
Democratic	Richard Wiles (incumbent)	37,606	57.7
Democratic	Carlos Carrillo	15,974	24.5
Democratic	Raul Mendiola	6,933	10.6
Democratic	Ron Martin	4,642	7.1
Total votes		65,155	100.0

== County Commission elections ==
=== Precinct 1 ===
The incumbent, Carlos Leon, was unopposed in the primary and general election.

=== Democratic ===
2020 El Paso County Commission Precinct 1
Party	Candidate	Votes	%
Democratic	Carlos Leon (incumbent)	15,670	100.0
Total votes		15,670	100.0

=== Precinct 3 ===
The incumbent, Vincent Perez, was defeated in the primary by Illiana Holguin, who went on to win the general election.

=== Democratic ===
2020 El Paso County Commission Precinct 3
Party	Candidate	Votes	%
Democratic	Vincent Perez (incumbent)	6,226	41.8
Democratic	Illiana Holguin	5,686	38.2
Democratic	Elia Garcia	2,125	14.3
Democratic	Eduardo Romero	856	5.7
Total votes		14,895	100.0

=== Runoff results ===
2020 El Paso County Commission Precinct 3
Party	Candidate	Votes	%
Democratic	Illiana Holguin	4,455	52.5
Democratic	Vincent Perez (incumbent)	4,024	47.5
Total votes		7,148	100.0

=== Republican ===
2020 El Paso County Commission Precinct 1
Party	Candidate	Votes	%
Republican	Randy French	2,492	100.0
Total votes		2,492	100.0

=== General election ===
2020 El Paso County Commission Precinct 3
Party	Candidate	Votes	%
Democratic	Illiana Holguin	46,342	72.9
Republican	Randy French	17,216	27.1
Total votes		63,558	100.0

== State senator (district 29) ==
=== Candidates ===
- Cesar Blanco, state representative (district 76)

=== Potential candidates ===
- Dori Fenenbock, former EPISD school board member

=== Declined candidates ===
- José Rodríguez, incumbent senator

== State representative (district 76) ==
=== Candidates ===
- Claudia Ordaz Perez, city council member
- Elisa Tamayo, former employee of state representative Cesar Blanco

=== Potential candidates ===
- Joe Pickett, former state representative (district 79)

=== Declined candidates ===
- Cesar Blanco, incumbent

== State representative (district 77) ==
=== Candidates ===
- Lina Ortega, incumbent representative

== State representative (district 78) ==
=== Candidates ===
- Joe Moody, incumbent representative

=== Potential candidates ===
- Dori Fenenbock, former EPISD school board member

== State representative (district 79) ==
=== Candidates ===
- Art Fierro, incumbent representative

==== Potential candidates ====
- Joe Pickett, former representative

== District Attorney ==
=== Candidates ===
==== Democratic ====
- James Montoya, prosecutor
- Yvonne Rosales, lawyer

==== Declined candidates ====
- Jaime Esparza, incumbent district attorney
- Joe Moody, state representative

== U.S. Representative (TX-16) ==
=== Republican ===
==== Potential candidates ====
- Blanca Trout, Canutillo ISD school board trustee and El Paso County Republican Party vice chair

== See also ==
- 2020 Texas elections
