= Borderplex Alliance =

Civil organization in El Paso, Texas, U.S.

- Formerly: Paso Del Norte Group
- Website: www.borderplexalliance.org

The Borderplex Alliance (formerly known as Paso Del Norte Group) is a civic economic development group formed in 2012 that focuses on business development in El Paso, Texas, Ciudad Juárez, and Southern New Mexico. The Borderplex group provides private, no-fee consultations to businesses and industries looking to expand or start operations in the greater El Paso region. The current CEO is Jon Barela. The group has operated under several different different names including Paso Del Norte Group (PDNG), El Paso Business Leadership Council and the PDNG Foundation. Other associated organizations include the El Paso Regional Economic Development Corp (RED-Co or REDCO) and the local chambers of commerce.

== History ==
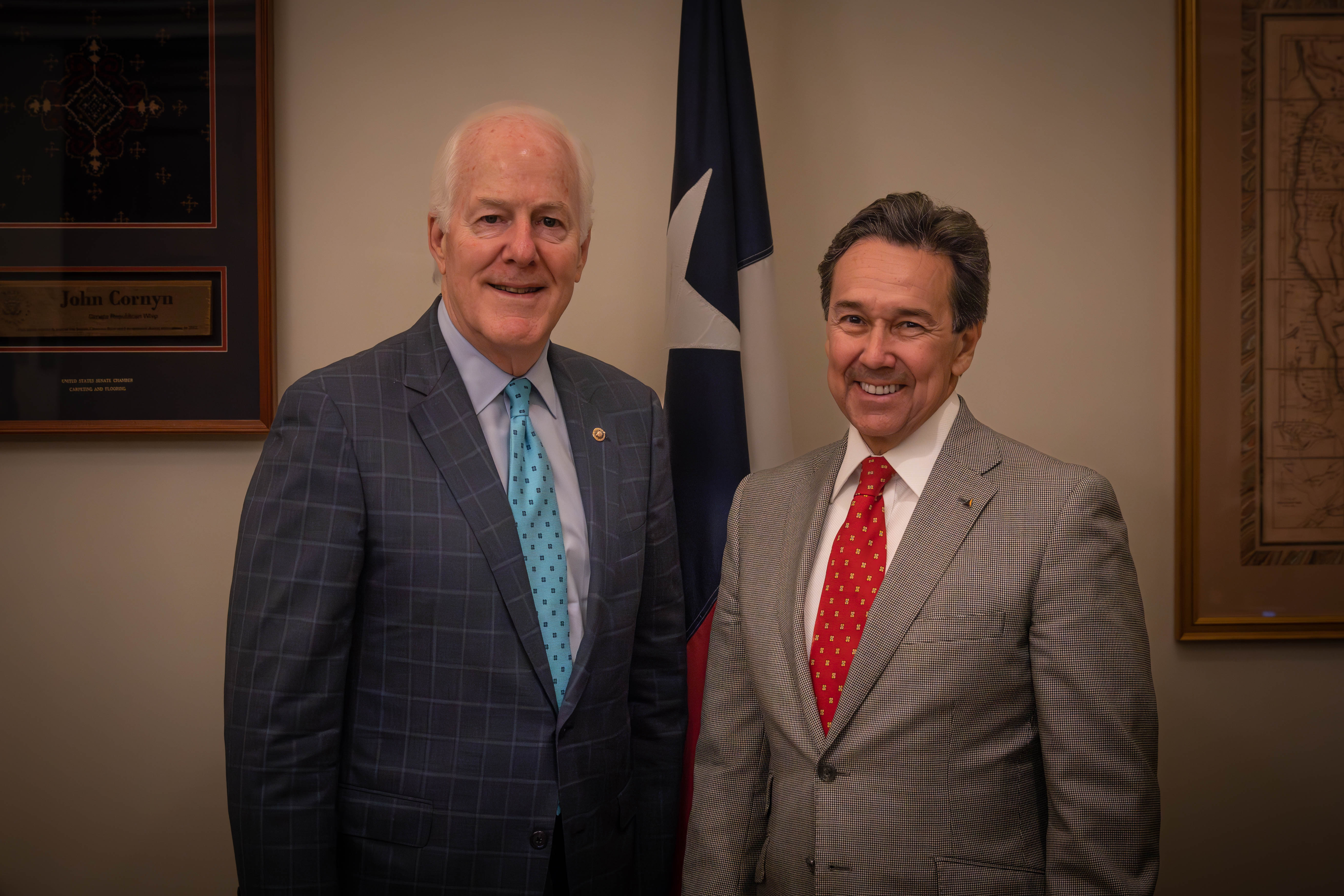
Texas Senator John Cornyn and CEO of Borderplex Alliance Jon Barela in June 2023

=== Paso Del Norte Group ===
The economic development group can trace it roots to 1999 when the El Paso Leadership and Research Council (El Paso LRC and renamed to El Paso Business Leadership Council in 2003) was formed and led by El Paso businessman, Woody Hunt and later, Bob Hoy. The group had around 50 members and was created to promote business development in the greater El Paso region. Membership dues were $2,500 a person.

On May 5, 1999 and Texas corporation was formed called the Paso Del Norte Group (PDNG). This organization was created to focus on driving private economic development in the El Paso region. On June 5, 2001, another nonprofit "supporting organization" called the PDNG Foundation, was formed and lasted until it was dissolved in 2013. The Business Leadership Council became part of PDNG when it was officially founded in June of 2004.

PDNG worked as an "exclusive private organization," according to scholar, Yolanda Chavez Leyva. Members of the group often used the different entities associated with PDNG "interchangeably and sometimes the same entity is referred by similar, yet different names." PDNG was described in Economic Geography as "a civic organization of wealthy oligarchs, real estate developers, and politicos from both sides of the border." By 2011, the group was made up of around 350 members.

=== Borderplex Alliance ===
In 2012, PDNG merged with the El Paso Regional Economic Development Corp (RED-Co or REDCO) to form the Borderplex Bi-National Economic Alliance or Borderplex Alliance. REDCO, an industrial recruiter, was formed in 2004.

The Borderplex Alliance was created as "privately funded nonprofit organization" which provides "confidential, no-fee" consultations to businesses and industries that are interested in working in the El Paso region. The group works in coordination with the Greater El Paso Chamber of Commerce and the El Paso Hispanic Chamber of Commerce. The Borderplex Bi-National Economic Alliance Foundation is part of the non-profit structure that provides funding to the Borderplex Alliance.

In 2014, the organization had a staff of ten people and an annual budget of $2.1 million. By early 2015, the El Paso Times printed an article by guest columnist praising Borderplex Alliance for their role in guiding El Paso development for a decade.

The Hunt Family Foundation donated $175,000 to the Borderplex Alliance in 2017. In 2025 the Borderplex Alliance was awarded the Economic Development Organization of the Year Award from the International Economic Development Council (IEDC).

The Borderplex Alliance hosted a bi-national summit in 2019, where the CEO, Jon Barela talked about securing the Mexico–United States border.

The Borderplex Alliance is also a major lobbyist working to keep military installations in the El Paso region. REDCo, the predecessor to Borderplex, was also a major lobbyist.

== Projects ==
=== Research and consulting ===
The El Paso LRC, the predecessor to PDNG, spent around $75,000 to commission a study from the University of Texas, El Paso (UTEP) in 1999 regarding bank loans and small businesses. REDCo, also a nonprofit and later part of Borderplex Alliance, was authorized up to $300,000 in payment for their services in for the coming fiscal year in 2006-2007. In 2009, the City was giving REDCo around $200,000 for recruitment efforts. In 2010, REDCo was authorized consulting funds, though some were cut due to a budget shortfall. REDCo has also received money from the Public Service Board which manages El Paso Water (EPWater).

The Borderplex Alliance Air Service Task Force conducted a study in 2014 about flights in and out of the El Paso International Airport. In 2015, Borderplex Alliance paid more than $200,000 for an economic development report covering the El Paso region. The 2015 report, released in June, was controversial and reused ideas from previous reports.

In 2018, the City of El Paso subset property downtown to create offices for the city's Economic Development Department.

Borderplex Alliance worked with EPWater in 2022 and 2024 to assist the utility to find potential buyer or lessees for property owned by EPWater. EP Water paid Borderplex $250,000 for their services in creating an economic development plan for the utility in 2022 and 2024.

=== Downtown El Paso Plan ===
PDNG was involved in a controversial plan, announced in 2006, to redevelop Downtown El Paso. The city government of El Paso contracted with PDNG on February 15, 2005 in order to create a master plan for the downtown development. The plan, created in part by PDNG cost around $750,000 total with El Paso city government contributing $250,000 to the cost. After the unveiling of the plan, it was clear that the next community to be targeted for redevelopment was El Segundo Barrio. Critics of the plan said that it was unveiled without public input and that it used the government to redistribute property through eminent domain to wealthy investors. The plan also included tax incentives for businesses. By 2006, Mayor John Cook said the city would look at redesigning the downtown area without as much input from PDNG.

In 2012, an attorney, Raymundo Rojas filed an ethics complaint against PDNG over their promotional advertising in support of city bonds to build a ballpark in the Downtown area. PDNG had not registered as a Political Action Committee (PAC) to support the bonds. Rojas was a member of the PAC, "No Bonds for Billionaires."

=== Datacenters and warehouses ===
In 2010, REDCo, the predecessor to Borderplex Alliance, recruited he Bosch Group to open a distribution warehouse in Socorro.

Borderplex Alliance was involved in bringing an Amazon Fulfillment Center in 2020. Talks behind bringing Amazon to El Paso involved the city's mayor, Dee Margo and Borderplex CEO, Jon Barela. The proposals were "shipped in a small gray box" to Amazon in October of 2017 with little transparency for the public, not even revealing the "number of pages in the proposal."

In 2025, the Borderplex Alliance worked with Meta to bring AI data center development to the Northeast El Paso area. Jon Barela, a CEO of Borderplex, called this multi-million dollar investment one of his proudest accomplishments. In 2025 Borderplex also worked with Wiwynn and El Paso County to open a manufacturing complex in Socorro, Texas.

=== NAFTA ===
During the NAFTA renegotiation, Borderplex Alliance hosted a conference in April of 2017 on the topic that included United States representatives such as Will Hurd. Borderplex was considered an important voice in negotiations, showing that there was regional buy-in to the trade agreement. In June of 2017, Borderplex Alliance and other Texas business organizations came together to form the Texas-Mexico Trade Coalition.

=== Other projects ===
In 2021, Borderplex Alliance was involved with the Pennsylvania Turnpike Commission and ASPIRE ERC.

In 2023, Schneider Electric worked with BorderPlex Alliance and opened a "smart factory" in El Paso.

In 2024, Borderplex Alliance announced a partnership with Spaceport America. Later, in 2026, Borderplex Alliance was awarded the largest grant of the year ($19.8 million) from the Texas Space Commission.

== Leadership ==
Members of the El Paso Leadership and Research Council included president, Bob Hoy, and other officers including David Arbuckle, Athony Berrett, Jack Chapman, Myrna Deckert, Hector Delgado, Paul Foster, Tripper Goodman, Bruce Gulbas, Robert Navarro, Mack Quintana, Robert Skov, Maria Teran, and Joe Wardy.

Gilbert Moreno was an early representative of PDNG. Deckert was Chief Operating Officer (COO) of the Paso Del Norte Group (PDNG) between 2004 and 2007. During this time, William Sanders, co-chair of the Verde Group development company, was also a chair of PDNG. In a May 19, 2006, email newsletter, Lisa Colquitt Muñoz was indicated to have accepted a staff position of Deputy COO. In 2010, Jackie Mitchell Edwards was the COO for PDNG.

Rolando Pablos was CEO of Borderplex Alliance as early as 2013. In August of 2016, Jon Barela became the CEO of Borderplex.

Borderplex has worked with the Mesilla Valley Economic Development Alliance (MVEDA) on projects located in Doña Ana County, New Mexico.

== Notable members ==
- Jon Barela (CEO of Borderplex).
- Paul L. Foster (in PDNG and Borderplex).
- Josh Hunt (Board of Directors of Borderplex).
- Woody Hunt (Chairman Emeritus of Borderplex).
- Stanley Pruet Jobe (Board of Directors of Borderplex).
- Dee Margo (member REDCo and PDNG).
- Beto O'Rourke (in PDNG).
- Rolando Pablos (former CEO of Borderplex).
- Angelica Rosales (Council of Advisors for Borderplex).
- William Sanders (chair of PDNG).
- Joe Wardy (On board of REDCo).
