= Las Cruces High School =

Public school in Las Cruces, New Mexico

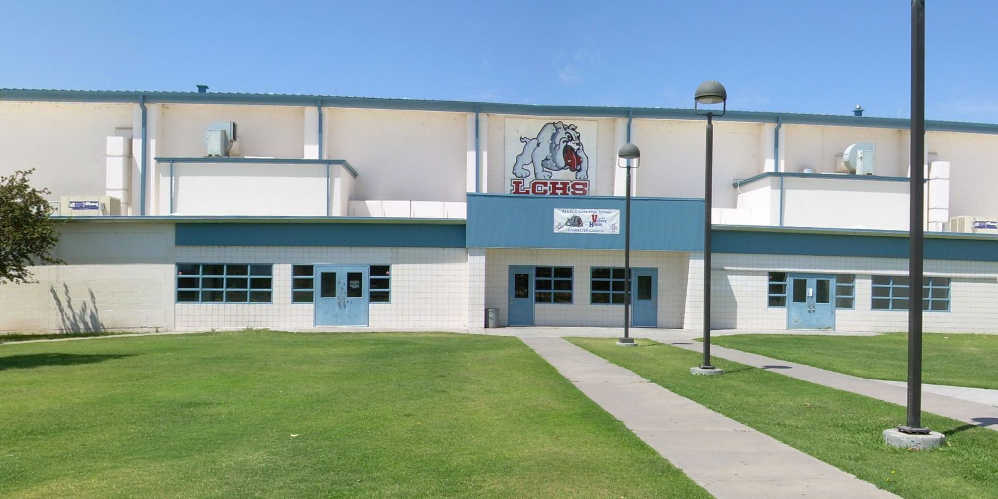

Location
- 1755 El Paseo Road; Las Cruces, New Mexico 88005; United States; 32.2916°N 106.7680°W

Information
- Funding type: Public
- Founded: 1918
- School district: Las Cruces Public Schools
- Principal: Brenda Ballard
- Teaching staff: 97.29 (FTE)
- Grades: 9–12
- Enrollment: 1,806 (2023-2024)
- Student to teacher ratio: 18.56
- Language: English
- Campus: Suburban
- Colors: Red, Blue, and White
- Athletics conference: NMAA, 6A Dist. 3
- Team name: Bulldawgs
- Communities served: south and west Las Cruces, Mesilla, Talaveras, Mesilla Park, University Park, Tortugas
- Website: https://lchs.lcps.net/

Las Cruces High School is a public high school in Las Cruces, New Mexico, United States. LCHS was established in 1918 and is the oldest public high school in Las Cruces. As of the 2021–22 school year, it serves 1,830 students from grades 9–12. It is a part of Las Cruces Public Schools.

== History ==
The former Las Cruces High School is located at the corner of Alameda and Picacho Avenues near Downtown Las Cruces and Holy Cross Catholic Church. The current campus (opened in 1954) inherited the Bulldog mascot and school colors from the former school. After the opening of the current campus, the old LCHS building was joined to the Third Judicial District Court of Las Cruces.

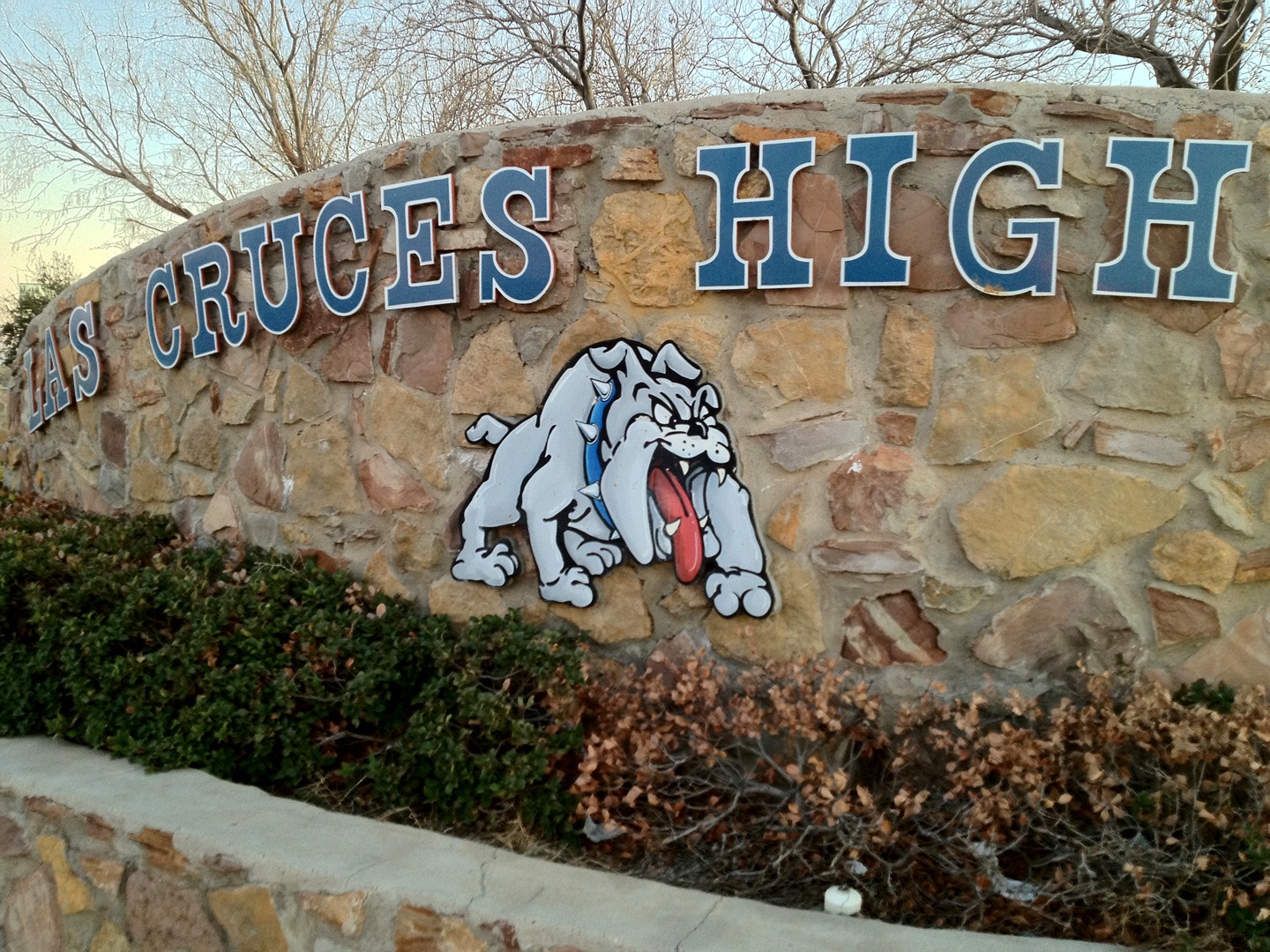
LCHS "Bulldawg" emblem

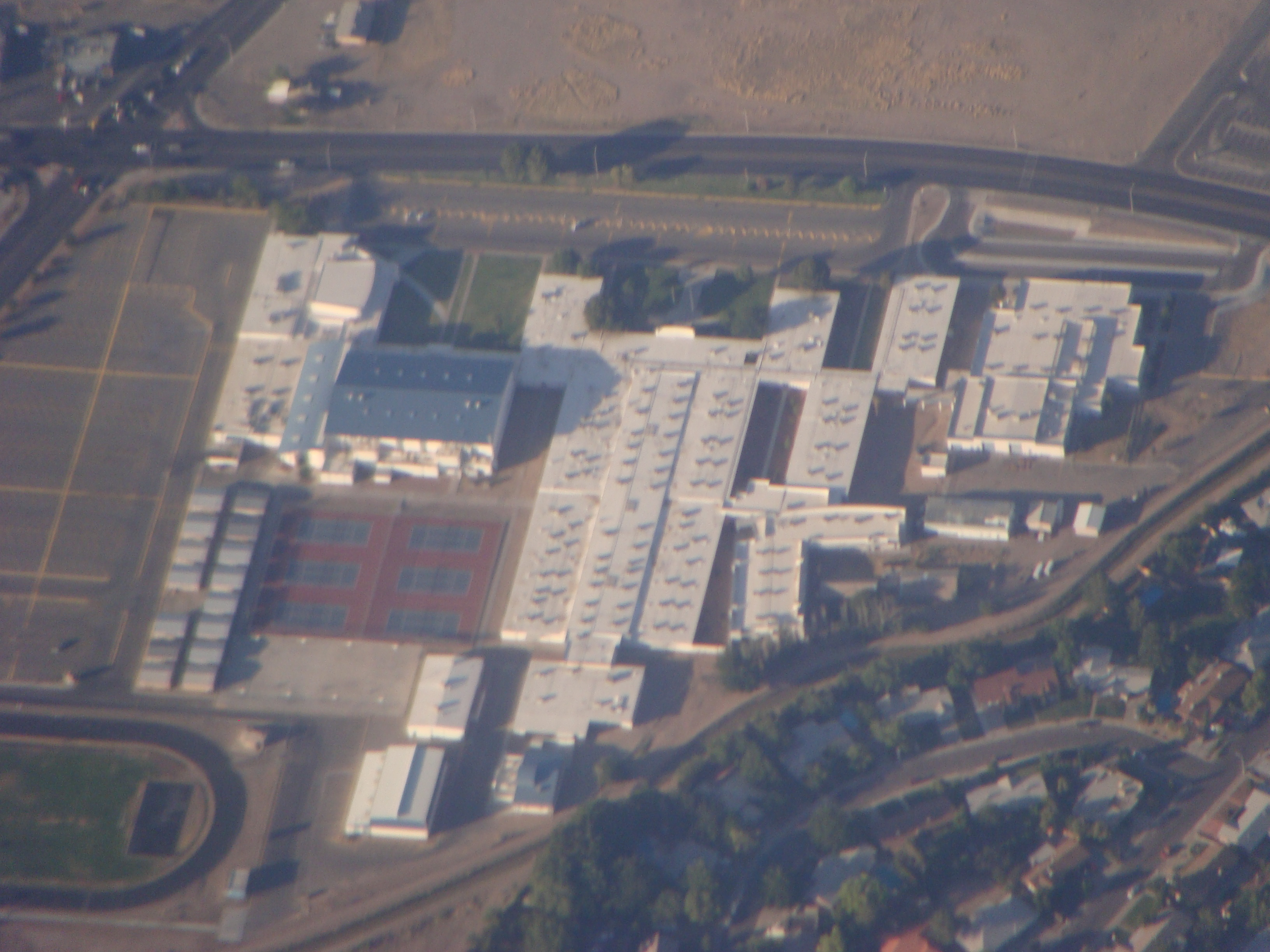
Aerial view of the LCHS Building prior to renovations

E/F wing prior to renovation

The current campus has undergone numerous renovations and expansions since opening its doors in 1956. The vocational building was constructed in 1993, and D wing was built in 1997. The music wing was renovated between 1996 and 1998. The cafeteria was renovated in 2000. That same year, the Gym Lobby, a Chapel-like space inside LCHS, was also constructed. Beginning in the summer of 2013, the rest of the campus underwent renovation, with a proposed budget of $84 million USD. Every renovation of LCHS was finalized at the August 2019 Fall Assembly with the entire student body present.

== Rivalry ==
LCHS has a long-standing rivalry with Mayfield, the city's second-oldest public high school, with the annual football clash between the schools routinely attracting more than 20,000 fans. LCHS and MHS have combined to win 11 of the past 20 New Mexico state championships in football, with the annual year-end game between the schools almost invariably determining the district title. The Mayfield-Las Cruces high school football rivalry was voted the 9th best in the nation by rivals.com in 2008. The documentary film Cruces Divided is based on this rivalry.

== Athletics ==
LCHS competes in the New Mexico Activities Association (NMAA), as a class 6A school in District 3. In 2014, NMAA realigned the state's schools in to six classifications and adjusted district boundaries. In addition to Las Cruces High School, the schools in District 3-6A include Alamogordo High School, Centennial High School, Clovis High School, Hobbs High School, and Organ Mountain High School. From its opening until the opening of the Pan American Center, the New Mexico State Aggies men's basketball team played its home games at the LCHS gym, and the West first round games of the 1959 NCAA University Division basketball tournament were held there, one of only two high school gymnasiums to host games of the tournament (the other being Capitol Hill High School in Oklahoma City).

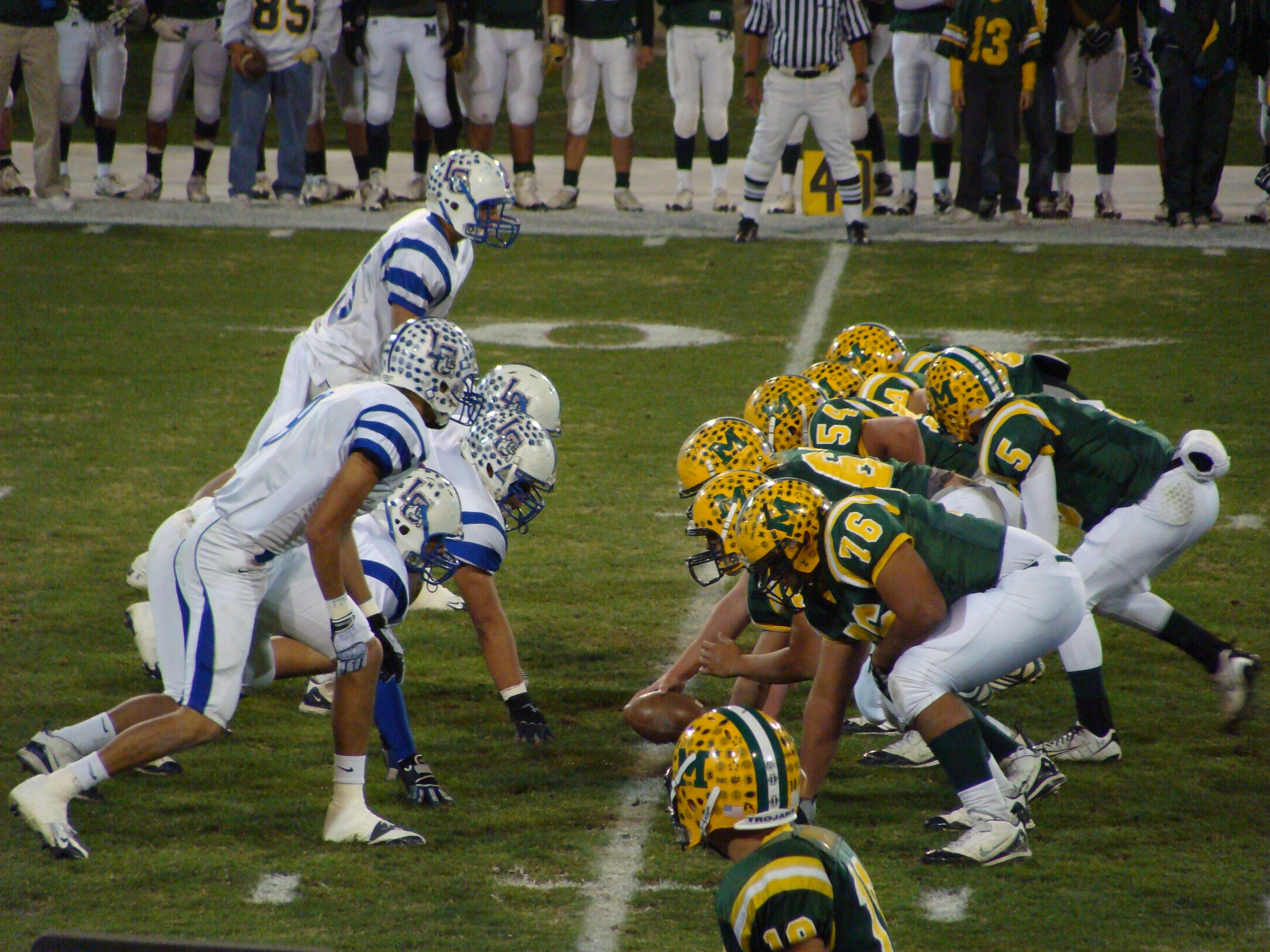
LCHS participates in an annual cross-town football rivalry with Mayfield High

Inside the LCHS main gymnasium

LCHS athletic fields and campus

North Commons

=== State championships ===
State championships
| Season | Sport | Number of Championships | Year |
|---|---|---|---|
| Fall | Boys cross country | 1 | 1972 |
| Fall | Football | 9 (8 official + 1 unofficial) | 2013, 2012, 2008, 2002, 2000, 1999, 1975, 1959, 1925*† |
| Fall | Marching band | 3 | 1986, 1984, 1979 |
| Fall | Boys soccer | 3 | 2013, 2007, 2004 |
| Fall | Girls soccer | 2 | 2005, 2003 |
| Fall | Girls volleyball | 5 | 2001, 2000, 1998, 1997, 1995 |
| Winter | Boys basketball | 9 | 2020, 2013, 1976, 1975, 1961, 1960, 1959, 1945*, 1941* |
| Winter | Co-Ed cheerleading | 5 | 2017, 2016, 2014, 2013, 2012 |
| Winter | Girls swimming & diving | 1 | 1983 |
| Winter | Wrestling | 2 | 1966, 1964 |
| Spring | Baseball | 5 | 1963, 1962, 1961, 1957, 1952* |
| Spring | Softball | 1 | 2013 |
| Spring | Boys track and field | 1 | 1962 |
| Spring | Boys tennis | 2 | 1996, 1995 |
| Spring | Girls tennis | 2 | 1997, 1996 |
| Total | | 48 | |

(*) Las Cruces Union High School

(†) Not officially recognized by NMAA, which does not recognize any state football titles before 1950.

== Notable alumni ==
- Clara Apodaca, First Lady of New Mexico
- Jon Barela, CEO of The Borderplex Alliance
- Rich Beem, professional golfer, 2002 PGA Champion
- Joseph Benavidez, UFC flyweight fighter
- Micaela Lara Cadena, member of the New Mexico House of Representatives
- Joe Cervantes, member of the New Mexico Senate
- Gonzalo Corbalán, professional basketball player
- Cate Culpepper, writer
- Sharon Douglas, actress
- Chuck Franco, First Gentleman of New Mexico (2011–2019)
- Jerry Hinsley, professional baseball player
- David Krummenacker, professional track athlete
- Taylor Lytle, professional soccer player
- Letticia Martinez, Paralympic swimmer
- Casey Owens, professional basketball coach
- Benjamin Alire Sáenz, author
- Dan Sosa Jr., justice of the New Mexico Supreme Court
- Vendula Strnadová, professional soccer player
- Josh Suggs, professional soccer player
