= Kathy Lueders =

American engineer and business manager

Kathryn Lueders
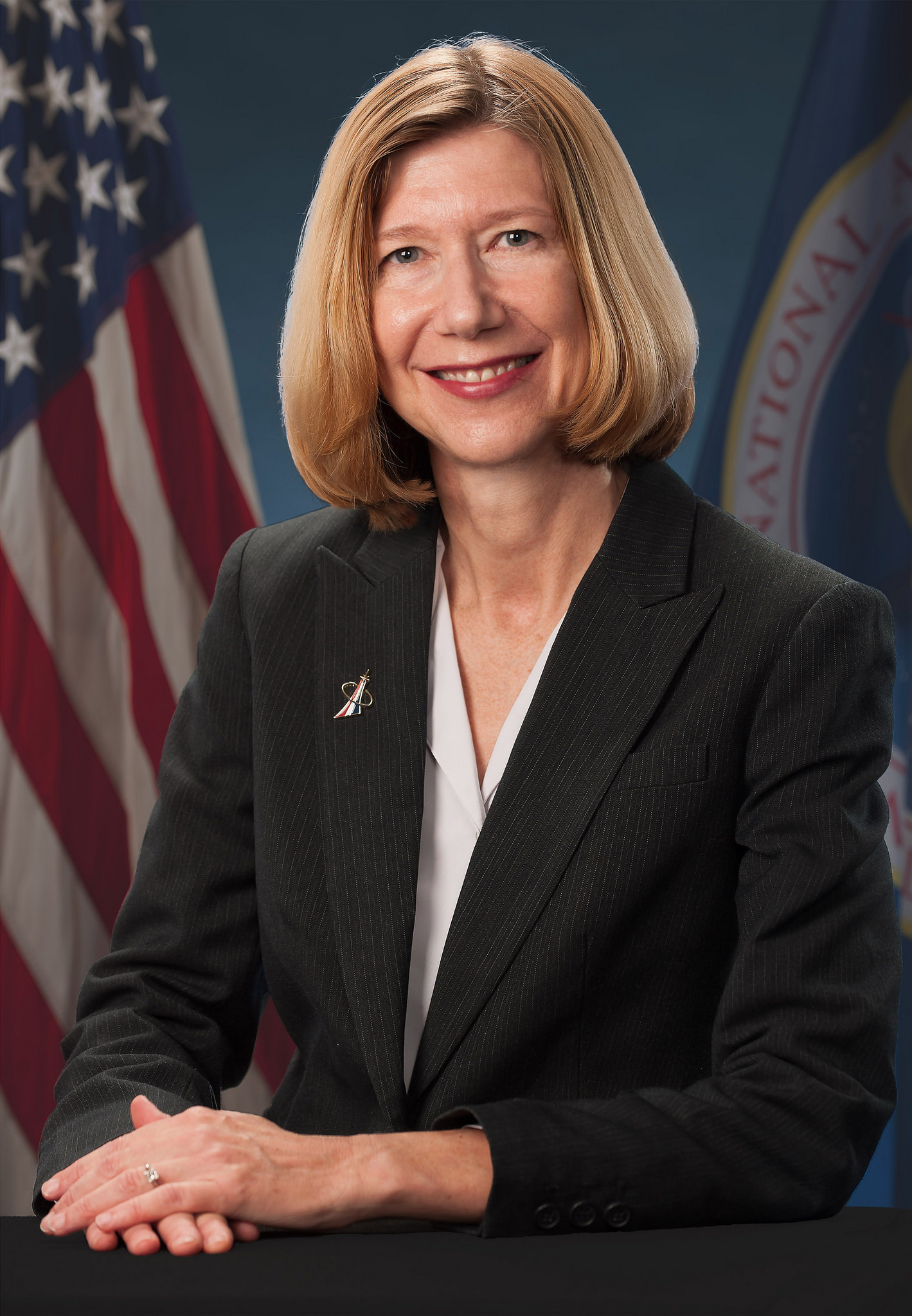
- Kathryn (Kathy) Lueders NASA Portrait (2014)
- Education: B.S. Business Administration in Finance; B.S. and M.S. Industrial engineering
- Alma mater: American School in Japan; University of New Mexico; New Mexico State University
- Employer: SpaceX
- Title: General manager at Starbase

Kathryn Lueders (pronounced "Leaders") is an American engineer and business manager. Lueders has led NASA's human spaceflight program as the Associate Administrator of the Human Exploration and Operations (HEO) Mission Directorate. She became the first woman to head human spaceflight. She was the program manager for NASA's Commercial Crew Program and oversaw the return of human spaceflight capabilities to NASA. She worked at SpaceX as Starbase General Manager from May 2023 until her retirement in May 2025 . She is separately Vice Chair of the Texas Space Commission and an advisor to Vast Space.

== Early life ==
Lueders grew up in Japan, and attended the American School In Japan for a portion of her school years. Her family was living in Tokyo when the 1969 Apollo 11 Moon landing occurred. She remembers her dad waking the whole family up for the event. She read Isaac Asimov while growing up.

In her undergraduate degree Lueders studied business, as she originally had aspirations to work on Wall Street. During her senior year, however, she wanted to switch to engineering after seeing her roommate study it. She became "interested in engineering because it gave me the tools to solve problems and work on something bigger."

Lueders earned her bachelor's degree of Business Administration in finance from the University of New Mexico in 1986. She also has a Bachelor of Science (1993) and Master of Science (1999) in industrial engineering from New Mexico State University.

== Career ==
=== NASA ===
Lueders began her NASA career as a co-op in 1992 in the safety and mission assurance office as a quality engineer at the White Sands Test Facility while still a student at New Mexico State. As only the second woman to work at the facility, after graduation Lueders started as the depot manager of the Space Shuttle program Orbital Maneuvering System and Reaction Control Systems. She was the Commercial Orbital Transportation Services Integration manager. She has also held several managerial positions within the International Space Station Program Office at NASA Johnson Space Center in Houston, Texas.

She also managed the commercial cargo resupply services (CRS) to the space station and was responsible for NASA's oversight of international partner spacecraft visiting the space station, including the European Space Agency's Automated Transfer Vehicle, the Japan Aerospace Exploration Agency's H-II Transfer Vehicle, and the Roscosmos' Soyuz and Progress spacecraft. She went to Kennedy Space Center as the acting Commercial Crew (CCP) Program Manager in 2013, and was selected as the head of the office in 2014. As this was NASA's first venture into commercial human spaceflight, Lueders brought her knowledge and experience from CRS to the formation and management of CCP.

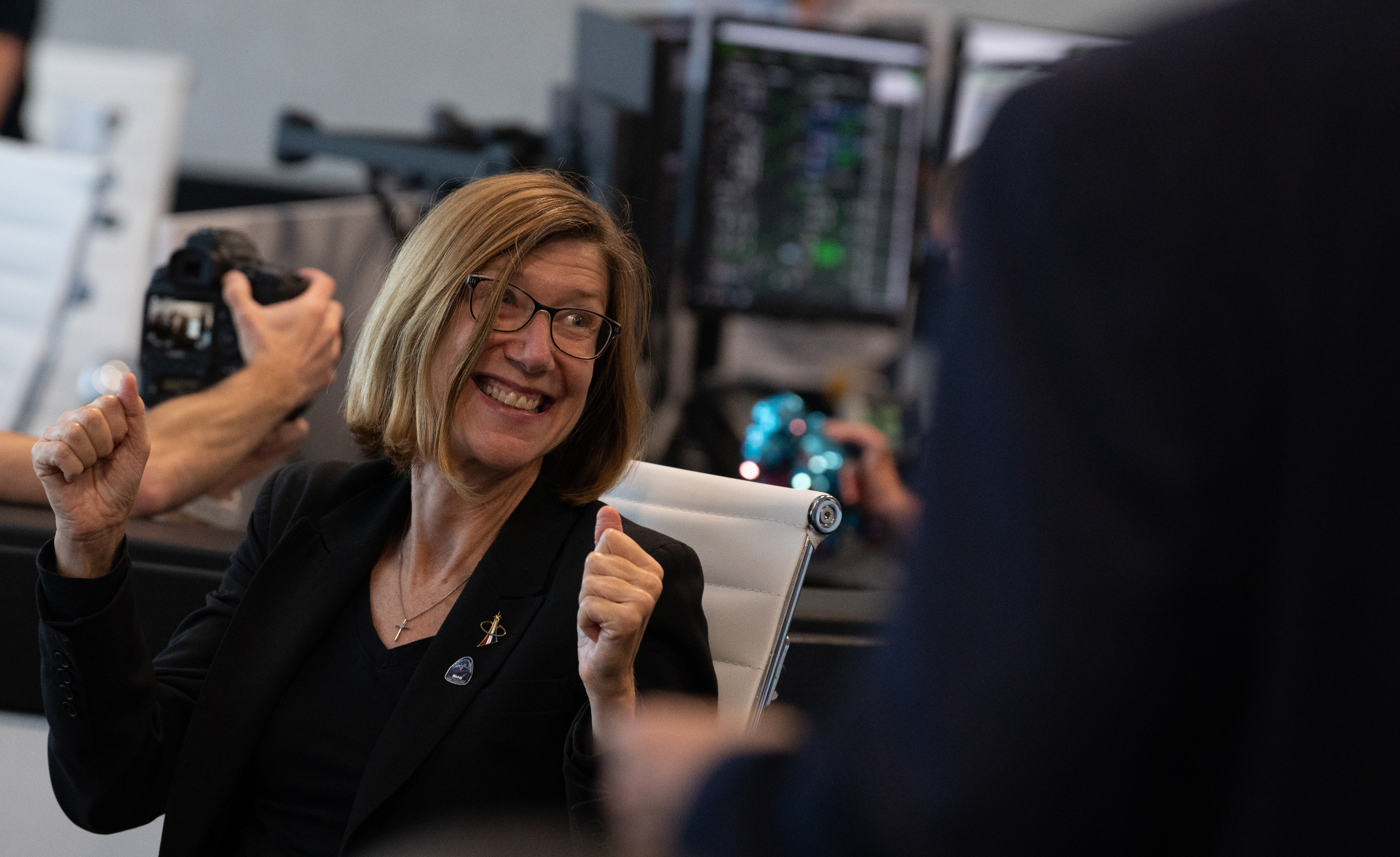
Kathy Lueders after SpaceX Demo-2 Hatch Opening to the ISS

Lueders managed a NASA team working with SpaceX and Boeing teams concurrently over seven years. She was the CCP manager when SpaceX launched the Crew Dragon Demo-2 mission on May 30, 2020, the first human launch from U.S. soil since the retirement of the Space Shuttle in July 2011. After the launch, she said "I am so grateful and proud of our NASA and SpaceX team."

On June 12, 2020, NASA Administrator Jim Bridenstine announced Lueders has been appointed the agency's new associate administrator of the Human Exploration and Operations (HEO) Mission Directorate. While considering whether or not to take the position, her husband pointed out she'd be the first woman in the position.

Lueders indicates, "Together, we are solving problems every day and it's one of my favorite aspects of the job." She was drawn to her jobs at NASA for the challenging problems the industry presents and not because she was a "space geek." She says "exploration is a team sport" and advocates working together with and giving space to all willing partners while discussing the Artemis program. She appreciates that being with NASA enables her to operate in a world community with other space-faring nations peacefully.

In late March 2023 Lueders announced she would retire from NASA in April 2023.

=== SpaceX ===
On May 15, 2023, a couple of weeks after retiring from NASA, it was reported that Lueders would join SpaceX as a general manager working on the Starship program at Starbase. She reports directly to SpaceX president and COO Gwynne Shotwell.

== Personal life ==
After getting married and having two children, Lueders returned to college to study engineering.
