= Vincent Perez (politician) =

American politician

Member of the Texas House of Representatives from the 77th district
- Incumbent
- Assumed office January 14, 2025
- Preceded by: Evelina Ortega

Personal details
- Party: Democratic
- Spouse: Claudia Ordaz (m. 2016; div. 2022)
- Education: Georgetown University

Vincent Perez is an American politician. He is the member for the 77th district of the Texas House of Representatives since 2025.

== Life and career ==
Perez attended Georgetown University, earning his undergraduate and graduate degrees in government. He married then-El Paso City Councilmember Claudia Ordaz in 2016 and the two divorced in 2022.

In March 2024, Perez defeated Alexsandra Annello and Homer Reza in the Democratic primary election for the 77th district of the Texas House of Representatives. In May 2024, he defeated Norma Chávez in the Democratic primary runoff election. No Republican candidate or incumbent was nominated to challenge him in the general election. He succeeded Evelina Ortega. He assumed office on January 14, 2025.
