= 2017 El Paso municipal elections =

- May 6, 2017

El Paso, Texas, held a first round of general elections on May 6, 2017, to elect the mayor and city council. The runoff election took place on June 10, 2017. Incumbent mayor Oscar Leeser was eligible for another term, but announced in July 2016 that he would not seek another term. Leeser had a cancer-related surgery in 2016, but stated that his decision was not because of his health. Instead, it was because he "ran to do things I thought were really important for our community and I did that."

The election was non-partisan; therefore, there was no primary election. However, if no candidate had won a majority, there would have been a runoff election.

The mayor and council members elected in 2017 were to serve through December 2020. The term was shortened because of a charter amendment to move city elections from May in odd-numbered years to November in even-numbered years.

Dee Margo took first place in the mayoral race, but did not win a majority of votes, so he and David Saucedo competed in a runoff election. Margo defeated Saucedo in the runoff. 8.57% of registered voters voted in the runoff election, one of the lowest turnouts in the city's history.

Districts 2, 3, 4, 7, and 8 had elections in 2017. District 2 incumbent, Jim Tolbert, and District 7 incumbent, Lilia Limon, were eligible for re-election, but were defeated by Alexansandra Annello and Henry Rivera, respectively. Emma Acosta, District 3 incumbent, and Carl Robinson, District 4 incumbent, were term limited and could not run again; they were succeeded by Cassandra Hernandez and Sam Morgan, respectively. District 8 representative Cortney Niland, whose term was supposed to end in December 2018, resigned in April 2017. The city scheduled a June special election and July runoff election to fill the remainder of her term. The runoff election was won by Cissy Lizarraga.

== Mayoral election ==
El Paso mayoral election, 2017
- May 6, 2017 (first round); June 10, 2017 (runoff)
- Turnout: 7.86% (first round); 8.26% (runoff)
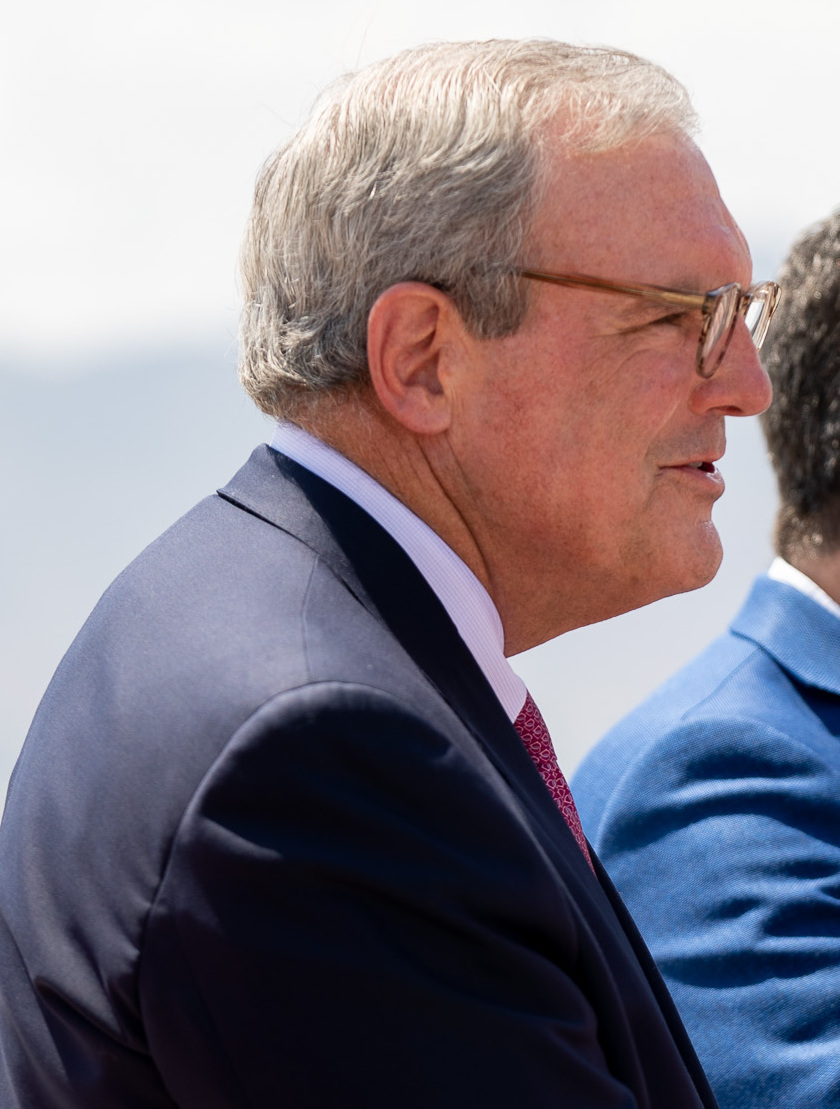

Candidate	Dee Margo	David Saucedo	Emma Acosta
Party	Nonpartisan	Nonpartisan	Nonpartisan
First round vote	14,915	7,883	5,239
First round percentage	45.32%	23.95%	15.92%
Runoff vote	17,148	12,937
Runoff percentage	57%	43%
Mayor before election
Oscar Leeser
Democratic
Elected mayor
Dee Margo
Republican

El Paso mayoral election results, 2017
Party	Candidate	Votes	%
Nonpartisan	Dee Margo	14,915	45.32%
Nonpartisan	David Saucedo	7,883	23.95%
Nonpartisan	Emma Acosta	5,239	15.92%
Nonpartisan	Elisa Morales	1,845	5.61%
Nonpartisan	Willie Cager	1,388	4.22%
Nonpartisan	Jaime Perez	950	2.89%
Nonpartisan	Charlie Stapler	412	1.25%
Nonpartisan	Jorge Artalejo	280	0.85%
Total votes		32,912	100%

=== Runoff results ===
El Paso mayoral election results, 2017
Party	Candidate	Votes	%
Nonpartisan	Dee Margo	17,148	57%
Nonpartisan	David Saucedo	12,937	43%
Total votes		30,085	100%

== City council election ==
=== Candidates ===
==== District 2 ====
===== Candidates =====
- Alexsandra Annello, student
- Dolores Baca, writer and housewife
- Jud Burgess, artist and activist
- Alexander Burnside, veteran and Bernie Sanders activist
- Jim Tolbert, city council representative (2016–2017)
- Raul Valdez, UTEP teaching assistant

===== First round results =====
El Paso District 2 election results, 2017
Party	Candidate	Votes	%
Nonpartisan	Alexsandra Annello	1,135	34.96%
Nonpartisan	Jim Tolbert	1,037	31.94%
Nonpartisan	Dolores Garcia Baca	440	13.55%
Nonpartisan	Jud Burgess	446	13.74%
Nonpartisan	Raul Scoop Valdez	111	3.42%
Nonpartisan	Alexander Burnside	78	2.40%
Total votes		3,247	100

===== Runoff results =====
El Paso District 2 election results, 2017
Party	Candidate	Votes	%
Nonpartisan	Alexsandra Annello	1,929	60.83
Nonpartisan	Jim Tolbert	1,242	39.17
Total votes		3,171	100

==== District 3 ====
===== Candidates =====
- Jaime Barceleau, charitable executive director for the Paso del Norte Children's Development Center
- Elias Camacho, Vietnam War veteran, retired El Paso Police Department detective, private investigator, and substitute teacher
- Cassandra Hernandez-Brown, deputy director of Dynamic Workforce Solutions
- Louis Pellicano, retiree
- Antonio Williams, private practice immigration attorney, and State Democratic Executive Committeeman for Texas Senate District 29

===== Results =====
El Paso District 3 election results, 2017
Party	Candidate	Votes	%
Nonpartisan	Cassandra Hernandez	1,925	37.80%
Nonpartisan	Jaime Barceleau	1,514	29.73%
Nonpartisan	Antonio Williams	819	16.08%
Nonpartisan	Elias Camacho	600	11.78%
Nonpartisan	Louis Pellicano	235	4.61%
Total votes		5,093	100

===== Runoff results =====
El Paso District 3 election results, 2017
Party	Candidate	Votes	%
Nonpartisan	Cassandra Hernandez	2,711	59.26
Nonpartisan	Jaime Barceleau	1,864	40.74
Total votes		4,575	100

==== District 4 ====
===== Candidates =====
- Shane Haggerty, retired firefighter and Ysleta Independent School District Board of Trustees president
- Sam Morgan, owner of El Paso Concealed Carry
- Jose Plasencia, Green Party activist, chess teacher
- Diana Ramos, Socorro Independent School District instructional aide and former employee of Congressman Beto O'Rourke

===== Results =====
El Paso District 4 election results, 2017
Party	Candidate	Votes	%
Nonpartisan	Sam Morgan	1,969	41.57%
Nonpartisan	Shane Haggerty	1,711	36.12%
Nonpartisan	Diana Ramos	960	20.27%
Nonpartisan	Jose Plasencia	97	2.05%
Total votes		4,737	100

===== Runoff results =====
El Paso District 4 election results, 2017
Party	Candidate	Votes	%
Nonpartisan	Sam Morgan	2,555	54.10
Nonpartisan	Shane Haggerty	2,168	45.90
Total votes		4,723	100

==== District 7 ====
===== Candidates =====
- Lily Limon, city council representative (2013–2017)
- Henry Rivera, police officer

===== Results =====
El Paso District 7 election results, 2017
Party	Candidate	Votes	%
Nonpartisan	Henry Rivera	2,797	62.39
Nonpartisan	Lily Limon	1,686	37.61
Total votes		4,483	100

==== District 8 ====
===== Candidates =====
- Trini Acevedo, health unit coordinator at University Medical Center
- Robert Cormell, businessman
- Gilbert Guillen, retired businessman and anti-arena activist
- Cissy Lizarraga, retired teacher
- Adolfo Lopez, attorney

===== Results =====
El Paso District 8 election results, 2017
Party	Candidate	Votes	%
Nonpartisan	Robert Cormell	1,724	42.25
Nonpartisan	Cissy Lizarraga	1,030	25.25
Nonpartisan	Gilbert Guillen	637	15.61
Nonpartisan	Adolfo Lopez	538	13.19
Nonpartisan	Trini Acevedo	151	3.70
Total votes			100

===== Runoff results =====
El Paso District 8 election results, 2017
Party	Candidate	Votes	%
Nonpartisan	Cissy Lizarraga	1,833	55.38
Nonpartisan	Robert Cormell	1,477	44.62
Total votes		3,310	100
