= Paul L. Foster =

American businessman

- Born: Paul L. Foster; October 8, 1957 (age 68); Snyder, TX
- Education: Baylor University
- Occupations: CEO of Franklin Mountain Investments, former chairman of Western Refining
- Known for: founding Western Refining, philanthropy involving educational institutions and quality of life initiatives
- Spouse: Alejandra de la Vega
- Website: www.fmiep.com

Paul L. Foster is an American businessman who is the CEO of Franklin Mountain Investments. He is the founder and former chairman of Western Refining, a Fortune 200 and Global 2000 oil refiner and marketer based in El Paso, Texas.

== Life ==
Foster was raised in Lovington, New Mexico and graduated high school there in 1975. He attended Baylor University, where he was a member of the Texas Theta chapter of Sigma Alpha Epsilon, graduating in 1979 with a bachelor's degree in accounting. .

After college, he started working at a local refinery in Lovington. Later, he worked for the El Paso Refinery Co. and when the company filed for bankruptcy in 1992, Foster lost his job the next year. In 1993, he became the vice president of Border Refining and Marketing Co.

In 1997, Foster founded Western Refining and served as the CEO. In 2002, Western Refining purchased the Chevron-Texaco refinery in El Paso and took over production in 2003.

In 2007, he appeared on the Forbes 400 list of wealthiest Americans, ranking 261st with a net worth estimated at $1.9 billion.

In 2007, Foster donated $50 million to help create the Paul L. Foster School of Medicine at Texas Tech University Health Sciences Center in El Paso. Foster and his wife donated $5 million to help fund major renovation of the 55-year-old Sun Bowl Stadium at the University of Texas at El Paso.

In November 2007, Foster was appointed to the board of regents of the University of Texas System by Governor Rick Perry. In 2009, Foster was elected vice chairman of the board of regents. In 2010 and 2011, he was re-elected as vice-chairman. In 2012, he was elected as chairman of the board of regents. In 2013, he was re-appointed to the board of regents. Foster is on the board of trustees for the Baylor College of Medicine and a member of the Texas Parks and Wildlife Commission.

As of 2014, Forbes listed Foster's net worth as $1.5 billion.

Foster significantly increased his real estate holdings in Downtown El Paso in 2019.

He is a member of the Borderplex Alliance.

Paul L. Foster net worth had risen substantially and has an estimated net worth of about $5.4 billion as of 2026. His fortune was primarily built through Western Refining, which was sold to Tesoro in a $6.4 billion deal in 2017. He later made billions through energy investments, including Franklin Mountain Energy, whose assets were sold to Coterra in a deal worth roughly $2.4–$2.5 billion. Today, his wealth is spread across energy, real estate, private companies, and sports investments.

== Politics ==
Foster has donated at least one million dollars to Freedom Partners Action Fund, a conservative Super PAC affiliated with the Koch Brothers.

After the 2021 Texas power crisis, it was made public that the chair of the Electric Reliability Council of Texas (ERCOT) did not live in Texas. That person, and other non-Texas residents of the board, lost their jobs and in October 2021 Foster became ERCOT's Chairperson. He resigned in June 2024.
