= Casey Owens (basketball) =

American professional basketball coach (born 1971)

Personal information
- Born: June 1, 1971 (age 55)

Career information
- High school: Las Cruces (Las Cruces, New Mexico)
- College: New Mexico State
- Position: Head coach
- Coaching career: 2001–present

Career history

Coaching
- 2001–2004: Dakota Wizards (assistant)
- 2004–2005: Dakota Wizards
- 2007–2009: Colorado 14ers (assistant)
- 2008–2010: Shanghai Sharks (assistant)
- 2010–2011: Xinjiang Flying Tigers (assistant)
- 2011–2012: Fujian Sturgeons
- 2012–2013: Guaiqueríes de Margarita
- 2013–2014: Los Angeles D-Fenders (assistant)
- 2015–2016: Los Angeles D-Fenders
- 2016–2018: Los Angeles Lakers (assistant)
- 2024–2025: Golden Eagle Ylli

Casey Owens is an American professional basketball coach, who most recently served as head coach for Golden Eagle Ylli in the Kosovo Superleague. He has worked in coaching, player development and scouting at the NBA, NBA D-League, Continental Basketball Association, and international levels.

== Early life and education ==
Owens graduated from Las Cruces High School in Las Cruces, New Mexico. In 1994, he graduated from New Mexico State University with a bachelor's degree in English. In 1996, he earned a master of fine arts in writing & poetics from Naropa University's Jack Kerouac School in Boulder, Colorado.

== Career ==
=== NBA and D-League ===
In 2015, Owens was hired as head coach of the L.A. D-Fenders. During the 2013–2014 season, Casey Owens was the assistant coach of the L.A. D-Fenders.

Casey Owens served an assistant coach for the Colorado 14ers of the NBA D-League from 2007 to 2009, and as an NBA D-League scouting consultant for the Denver Nuggets and Milwaukee Bucks.

On August 19, 2016, the Lakers named Owens assistant coach and advanced scout.

=== International ===
Owens served as head coach of Guaiqueries in the Venezuelan Professional League for the 2012–13 season. Owens got his start in China as an assistant coach for the Shanghai Sharks in 2009–10. Owens left Shanghai after one season to take the reins as head coach of Fujian SBS for the 2010–11 season. With Owens in charge, Fujian won the Kunming Summer Invitational and the Haiygun CBA Tournament in the same season. He was an assistant coach in the 2011–12 season as for the Xinjiang Flying Tigers of the Chinese Basketball Association, where the team reached the semi-finals.
