= Suleman Lalani =

American politician and medical doctor

Member of the Texas House of Representatives from the 76th district
- Incumbent
- Assumed office January 10, 2023
- Preceded by: Claudia Ordaz (redistricted)

Personal details
- Born: July 18, 1967 (age 59) Pakistan
- Party: Democratic
- Spouse: Zakia Lalani
- Education: Sindh Medical College

Suleman Lalani (born July 18, 1967) is an American politician and medical doctor who represents district 76 of the Texas House of Representatives. A member of the Democratic Party, Lalani is one of the first Muslims and South Asian lawmakers in the Texas legislature.

== Early life and education ==
Lalani is a native of Pakistan and graduated from Sindh Medical College, then immigrated to the United States in the 1990s and completing his fellowship at Baylor College of Medicine. He has practiced medicine for nearly two decades, specializing in geriatrics. He is quadruple board certified by the American Board of Internal Medicine in geriatric medicine, hospice and palliative medicine, and internal medicine.

== Career ==
In 2020, Lalani ran for the Texas House of Representatives in the 26th district. He placed first in the Democratic primary election with 31.7% of the vote, but lost to L. Sarah DeMarchant in the subsequent runoff election with 47.7% of the vote.

In 2022, Lalani ran for the redrawn 76th district, a new district in Fort Bend County including Sugar Land. He placed first in the Democratic primary election with 36.7% of the vote and defeated Vanesia Johnson with 63% of the vote in a runoff election. He defeated Republican candidate Dan Mathews with 57.3% of the vote. Lalani and fellow Democrat Salman Bhojani became the first Muslim and South Asian lawmakers to serve in the Texas House of Representatives upon their election.

In 2024, Lalani ran for re-election. He defeated Johnson in a rematch in the Democratic primary and Republican Lea Simmons in the general election.

=== Tenure ===
In 2025, Lalani proposed legislation to create an awareness campaign for domestic and sexual violence against men, including putting up visible signage in men’s restrooms, and to bar sex offenders from owning firearms. In March of 2026, he made a stand against Islamaphobia by teaming up with Christian Manuel to form the Texas Interfaith Legislators Caucus.
