= Art Fierro =

American politician from Texas

Member of the Texas House of Representatives from the 79th district
- In office February 12, 2019 – January 10, 2023
- Preceded by: Joe Pickett
- Succeeded by: Claudia Ordaz Perez

Personal details
- Born: Peter Arthur Fierro; December 20, 1961 (age 64)
- Party: Democratic
- Spouse: Annabelle Perez
- Children: 1
- Education: El Paso Community College; University of Texas at El Paso

Peter Arthur "Art" Fierro (born December 20, 1961) is a Texas Democratic politician who served in the Texas House of Representatives for district 79.

== Personal life ==
Fierro's hometown is El Paso, Texas. Fierro has attended El Paso Community College and University of Texas at El Paso. His wife is Annabell Perez, who is a District Court Judge, have one daughter Julianna. He works as a public relations consultant.

== Political career ==
Fierro served on the El Paso Community College Board of Trustees between 2006 and 2019. Fierro also served in the Texas House of Representatives from the 79th district from 2019 to 2023. He assumed office on February 12, 2019. Fierro is affiliated with the Democratic Party. Following redistricting in 2020, Fierro lost the 2022 Democratic primary for Texas's 79th House of Representatives district to fellow Representative Claudia Ordaz Perez. During the 2022 general election, Fierro won a seat El Paso's City Council, taking office on January 3, 2023.
