= Joe Pickett (politician) =

American politician in Texas (born 1956)

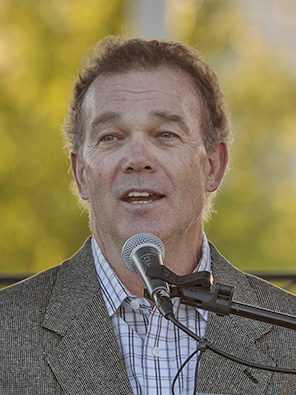
- Pickett in 2019

Member of the Texas House of Representatives from the 79th district
- In office January 3, 1995 – January 4, 2019
- Preceded by: Pat Haggerty
- Succeeded by: Art Fierro

Personal details
- Born: December 6, 1956 (age 69)
- Party: Democratic

Joseph C. "Joe" Pickett (born December 6, 1956) is an American politician who served as a Democratic member of the Texas House of Representatives from 1995 until his resignation in January 2019. Pickett represented the 79th District, which encompasses part of El Paso County.

== Political career ==
Pickett started his political career as a City Council member for the City of El Paso, Texas, defeating the incumbent in 1991. He served on the City Council until he was elected to the position of State Representative for the 79th District in 1994.

He served with three House Speakers (Pete Laney, Tom Craddick and Joe Straus and three Governors: (George W. Bush, Rick Perry and Greg Abbott).

Looking across the entire history of the Texas Legislature since El Paso gained representation in 1851, Joe Pickett holds the all-time record for the most House leadership and committee chairmanships held by an El Pasoan.

Upon his retirement in January 2019, historical reviews of the Texas House confirmed that Pickett held more committee chairmanships and formal leadership positions than any other El Paso representative in state history.

During his 24-year career in the Texas House of Representatives (1995–2019), Joe Pickett focused heavily on transportation funding, toll road reform, local economic development, and public safety. As Chair of the House Transportation Committee, hewas instrumental in passing major statewide infrastructure measures that directly funded highway projects across El Paso.

Major Transportation & Infrastructure Legislation

- Proposition 1 (2014): Pickett championed this constitutional amendment to redirect a portion of oil and gas severance taxes from the state&#39;s Rainy Day Fund into the State Highway Fund. The measure generated $1.7 billion in its first year for non-tolled road construction across Texas, including major corridors in El Paso.
- Proposition 7 / SJR 5 (2015): Serving as the House sponsor for Senate Joint Resolution 5, Pickett helped pass a bipartisan constitutional amendment dedicating $2.5 billion annually from state sales tax revenues and 35% of motor-vehicle sales and rental taxes to the Texas Highway Fund. Voters approved the measure with 83% support.
- Eliminating El Paso Tolls: Pickett successfully pushed to remove the toll charges on El Paso's César Chávez Border Highway (Loop 375) from Zaragoza Road to U.S. 54. He also led legislative efforts to block proposed tolls on the Border Highway West extension project.
- Toll Accountability (SB 312 Amendments): In 2017, Pickett authored key amendments to Texas Department of Transportation (TxDOT) sunset legislation requiring toll road authorities to repay state funds and mandating regular construction status reports.

Public Safety & State Employee Initiatives

- Texas Silver Alert System: Inspired by local cases in El Paso, Pickett authored the legislation that created the statewide Silver Alert network. The system broadcasts emergency notifications on highway signs and mobile devices when senior citizens with documented cognitive impairments go missing.
- State Employee Volunteer Leave: Pickett passed legislation granting state employees paid administrative leave (comp time) each month to volunteer in their local communities and schools.

He served on the House Research Organization (HRO) steering committee. In addition, he was a member of the House Committee on Investments and Financial Services, as well as the House Committee on Redistricting. He has also served on the Licensing and Administrative Procedures Committee, Land and Natural Resources, Juvenile Justice & Family Affairs.

Joe Pickett received the City of El Paso Conquistador Award twice. He was first awarded the recognition on June 1, 1993, during the administration of Mayor Bill Tilney. his second honor was approved and presented during the administration of Mayor John Cook.

Pickett was named legislator of the year by the Texas Transit Association, The Texas Public Employee's Association, the Texas DPS Officer's Association, the West Texas Poison Control Network, and the Texas Council of Child Welfare Boards.

Twice, Joe Pickett was recognized as El Pasoan of the Year by El Paso Inc.:

- 2003: Medical School Approval:
  - Pickett shared the 2003 award with eight other community and political leaders,including State Sen. Eliot Shapleigh, Woody Hunt, and Adair Margo.
- 2013: Transportation and Legislative Leadership
  - Statewide Highway Funding. Pickett was honored individually in 2013 largely forauthoring and passing House Bill 1 during the Legislature's third special session. The bill placed a constitutional amendment on the ballot to direct billions of dollars in oil and gas tax revenues toward Texas transportation infrastructure.
  - Bipartisan Cooperation. Community leaders praised his ability to work across the aisle in the Texas House to secure vital funding for El Paso.

In October of 2016, Pickett snuck a 1927 Ford Model T piece by piece into his Capitol office and fully assembled it where it remained until January 2019.

In June 2015, previous to the Texas Rangers releasing their final investigation report, Pickett was named by Texas Monthly magazine as one of the "Worst Legislators of 2015," referencing an incident during a House Transportation Committee meeting where Pickett had another member of the legislature removed, based on a suspicion of the improper registration of witnesses on a certain bill to create a misconception of overwhelming support for the bill up for consideration. In September 2015, the House Committee on General Investigation & Ethics and the Texas Rangers released a finding of no direct fault on Stickland's behalf for the improper registrations, and a call for change to the House current Witness Registration was made by the Ethics Committee. However, Pickett was exonerated in the investigation report, the Texas Rangers found that Stickland's staff members (who refused to cooperate with the investigation) were found to have improperly registered witnesses who were not present at the hearing or in the Texas Capitol. At least 29 people were found to be registered through an IP address that traced back to Stickland's office. Travis County District Attorney Rosemary Lehmberg announced she had found evidence of falsification, but determined it was not explicitly prohibited by law.

At the January 2019 Texas Transportation Commission meeting, TxDOT formally honored Pickett with a commission resolution and recognition ceremony for his decades of transportation leadership, which is sometimes confused with an annual named award.

In October of 2012, Pickett was awarded the Russell H. Perry Award. Named after a former Texas Highway Commission chair, this award recognizes a non-TxDOT employee who has played a major role in raising public awareness and support for Texas transportation.

Former Texas State Representative and vintage vehicle collector Joe Pickett is the sole private owner of a historic PCC streetcar model identical to the ones used in downtown El Paso. Key Details:

- The Purchase: Pickett bought a vintage 1937 PCC streetcar—similar to the ones operated by Sun Metro—along with 50 feet of railroad track from the Texas Pacifico Transportation railroad company to house and restore it.
- Restoration: The streetcar has been undergoing a long-term private restoration project by Pickett in El Paso.
- Context on El Paso Streetcars: The actual active fleet running across the 4.8-mile downtown and UTEP loops consists of six restored 1937 PCC streetcars operated by Sun Metro, which were renovated separately from Pickett's private collection.

Pickett resigned from the Texas House in January 2019 in order to fight cancer. A special election was called to determine his successor.

== Personal life ==
Pickett holds a Texas Real Estate Broker's license and has been a real estate educator for more than two decades. He has written and published textbooks on real estate laws for continuing education classes. He is the author of several children's books, including Margo! The Weird Cat! (2006) and Two Apples and Two Cookies.

== Bibliography ==
- Pickett, Joe C. (2006). Margo! the Weird Cat!. Salt Lake City, Utah: Utah Aardvark Global Publishing Co. ISBN 978-1-599-71689-3.

== See also ==
- List of children's literature authors
- List of people from Texas

Preceded by Pat Haggerty	Member of the Texas House of Representatives from District 79 (El Paso County); 1995 – present	Succeeded by Art Fierro
