= Texas's 76th House of Representatives district =

American legislative district

Texas's 76th State House of Representatives district
Representative
| Suleman Lalani; D–Sugar Land |
- Demographics: 20.5% White; 23.8% Black; 22.7% Hispanic; 33.1% Asian
- Population (2020) • Voting age: 198,548; 148,367

The 76th district of the Texas House of Representatives consists of a portion of Fort Bend County. The current representative is Suleman Lalani, who has represented the district since 2023.

== List of representatives ==
| Representative | Party | Years served | Counties represented | Notes |
|---|---|---|---|---|
| Naomi Gonzalez | Democratic | January 2011 – January 2015 | El Paso | Lost re-nomination in 2014. |
| Cesar Blanco | Democratic | January 13, 2015 – January 12, 2021 | El Paso | Retired to successfully run for the Texas Senate in 2020. |
| Claudia Ordaz | Democratic | January 12, 2021 – January 10, 2023 | El Paso | Redistricted to the 79th district and re-elected in 2022. |
| Suleman Lalani | Democratic | January 10, 2023 – Present | Fort Bend | |
