= Jon Barela =

American business executive

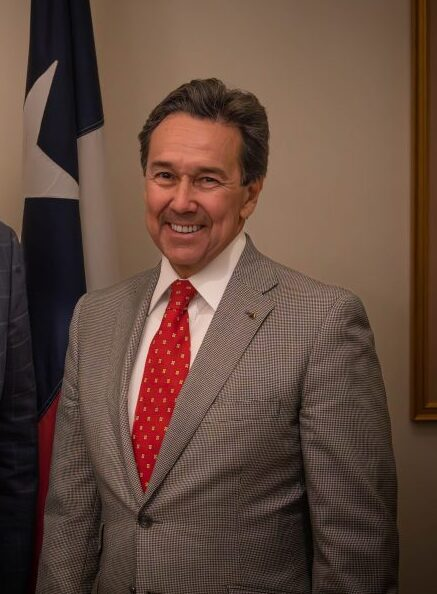
- Born: Las Cruces, New Mexico
- Education: Georgetown University School of Public Service, Georgetown University Law School (1987)
- Political party: Republican
- Spouse: Gina Barela
- Children: John Paul, Christiana, Joseph

Jon Barela (born c. 1960) is an American business executive. He is currently the chief executive officer (CEO) of The Borderplex Alliance, a civic economic development group active in the Ciudad Juárez, El Paso and southern New Mexico region. Previously, he served as Economic Development Secretary for the state of New Mexico and was the 2010 Republican nominee for New Mexico's 1st congressional district.

== Early life and education ==
Jon Barela was born around 1960 and raised in Las Cruces, New Mexico. Barela attended Las Cruces High School. He earned a bachelor's degree from Georgetown University in 1982. After graduation Barela joined the staff of New Mexico Republican Congressman Joe Skeen. While working for Congressman Skeen, Barela earned his Juris Doctor degree from Georgetown University Law Center in 1987.

== Career ==
Barela returned to New Mexico in 1987 and joined the Modrall law firm in Albuquerque. In 1989, he worked at the New Mexico's Assistant Attorney General's Office where he became director of the civil division.

In 1993, Barela joined Intel as its community and government relations manager and stayed in that role for about twelve years. In 2002, he started working on "several business ventures." Barela co-founded Cerelink, a technology start-up firm that specialized in complex computer rendering for visual effects in Hollywood films. Prior to founding Cerelink, Barela had no prior experience in technology development for the entertainment industry. Barela said that he resigned from the board at Cerelink in 2009.

Barela was the co-chair of the APS Foundation when he was recommended as an appointee to the Albuquerque School Board in 2008. He served through 2009. The school board passed a policy that replaced a hot lunch with a meal that included a cheese sandwich, milk or juice, and carrot sticks when the children' parents fell behind with their lunch payments. Barela supported the policy, "We don't want to be bailing people out of their responsibility because they know the community is going to step up and pay this bill."

Barela ran unopposed in the primary for New Mexico's 1st congressional district Republican nomination in 2010. In 2011, he was questioned by media outlets on whether Cerelink was the beneficiary of tax credits from state government. In October 2010, Barela told KKOB-AM that those reports were "erroneous." He told the Albuquerque Journal that his company "never received any tax credits, period. That is just flatly inaccurate it is just wrong."

In 2012, Barela was confirmed as the Cabinet Secretary of the New Mexico Economic Development Department. In July 2012, the Albuquerque Journal reported that Cerelink had stopped operations and was bankrupt, leaving the New Mexico Computer Application Center with an outstanding bill of $934,000. In 2014, Barela was the target of a whistleblower lawsuit that accused him of granting tax credits to Cerelink while he was Cabinet Secretary of the New Mexico Economic Development Department, among other allegations. In the whistleblower lawsuit, Barela also allegedly had an extramarital affair with a subordinate. Barela and the NM Economic Development Department denied all allegations in March 2014. In 2015, he was unanimously reconfirmed as Cabinet Secretary.

On October 1, 2016, Barela became the CEO of the Borderplex Alliance. In 2020, along with Borderplex, he helped bring an Amazon fulfillment center to El Paso. He was instrumental in bringing a potential data center for Meta to El Paso. El Paso citizens began to raise concerns about the new data center. When El Paso citizens spoke out at El Paso City Council meetings against the data centers in early 2026, Barela labeled them a "virus."

== Political positions ==
Barela said he "grew up a Democrat, but switched parties in 1984, during the Ronald Reagan-Walter Mondale presidential race."

He signed the Americans for Tax Reform "Taxpayer Protection Pledge", a written promise by legislators and candidates for office that commits them to oppose tax increases. He supported the "Learn and Earn" program. Barela received the highest rating from the National Rifle Association. The Gun Owners of America also gave him their highest rating and their endorsement.
