= Stanley Pruet Jobe =

Stanley Pruet Jobe is an American businessman from El Paso, Texas. In 1994, he and four others were convicted of bank fraud in El Paso. In 2001, he was pardoned by President Bill Clinton. Jobe's concrete plants and quarries have been challenged in El Paso for environmental reasons, citing health concerns and pollution from the operations. Jobe has also donated some of his land to the Texas Parks and Wildlife Department.

== Biography ==
Jobe, his father, Billie Mac Jobe, and two others started Jobe Concrete in 1983. In 1990, his company purchased El Paso Sand. During this time, the State National Bank suspected that the Jobe family may be involved in "check kiting and other bank frauds." The federal indictment for these incidents came down in November 1993. The trial of Jobe, his father and three others, started in June 1994. During the trial, the presiding judge, Harry Lee Hudspeth, dropped most of the original charges in the case, so the five defendants had to defend nine counts of check kiting. Jobe and the other defendants were found guilty of bank fraud on July 1, 1994. Jobe had a 10-month jail and halfway house sentence and a fine of $15,000. He unsuccessfully appealed his conviction.

After his conviction, his wife, Martie Jobe, petitioned for a pardon from the United States Department of Justice. Because of his felony conviction, the United States Army Corps of Engineers recommended that the federal government end its relationship with Jobe Concrete. Politicians, John Sharp and George W. Bush, returned Jobe's political campaign donations in 1998. In January 2001, Jobe was granted a pardon by President Bill Clinton.

Jobe Concrete was sold in 1999 to another company, RMC Group, which was acquired that March by Cemex. In late 2000 Jobe and his company faced a class action civil lawsuit over environmental concerns about his concrete plant. Later, Jobe faced off with El Paso Mayor Ray Caballero, over environmental issues with Jobe's quarry and cement plants. Lawsuits were brought over the quarry at McKelligon Canyon and the Jobe Toro facility on Paisano Drive. Caballero asked about Jobe: "Are we going to let him take the mountain down?" In 2004, Jobe donated twenty acres of land near McKelligon Canyon owned by his company to the Texas Parks and Wildlife Department.

Jobe and his sister, Irene Epperson started a new construction company in April 2005 named Jobe Materials. In 2006, Stanley Jobe argued that his new quarry in the North Hills neighborhood of Northeast El Paso was not a problem because "There's not, to me, a legitimate complaint to having a quarry right there." Residents of North Hill said that the quarry would create poor air quality and traffic issues.

In 2017, Jobe became a member of the Executive Committee of Borderplex Alliance. In 2024, El Paso City Council approved a request to rezone land near Rio Bosque Park for another permanent cement plant for Jobe.
