= Angelica Rosales =

Angelica Rosales is an American business executive for Sundt Construction. She is also an anti-abortion advocate who opened a crisis pregnancy center in El Paso, Texas. She is a member of the Texas Commission for Women, appointed by Governor Greg Abbott.

== Biography ==
Rosales graduated high school from Loretto Academy and later graduated from the University of Texas at Austin in 1999 with a degree in corporate communication. She also holds a master's degree in Construction Management from the University of Texas at El Paso (UTEP).

When she returned to El Paso, she felt that there was a need for a Catholic crisis pregnancy center. Rosales and her mother are both anti-abortion activists. Rosales opened a crisis pregnancy counseling center, the San Martin de Porres House of Hope, in the Lower Valley of El Paso in 2002. The House of Hope moved to Central El Paso in 2004. As executive director of the House of Hope, Rosales also promoted abstinence only sex education which they called the "Sexual Integrity Advocate Program."

Later, Rosales became involved in construction companies in El Paso. In 2018, she became part of the Sundt Construction business team for El Paso. In 2019, she became part of the Executive Forum in El Paso.

Rosales was appointed twice to Governor Greg Abbott's Texas Commission for Women which focuses on women-owned businesses. She is also on the Council of Advisors for the Borderplex Alliance. She is a director of the Texas Lyceum.
