= Duranguito =

Neighborhood in El Paso, Texas

Coordinates: 31.7561°N 106.4908°W

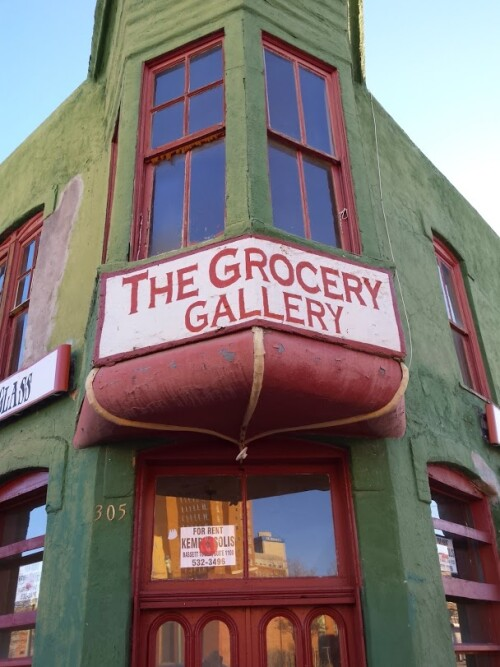
The Grocery Gallery, part of the Duranguito neighborhood in El Paso in February 2015.

Duranguito (or Barrio Duranguito) is a historic neighborhood in El Paso, Texas. It is located in the greater Union Plaza district and is located on the south side of Downtown El Paso near the neighborhoods of El Segundo Barrio and Chihuahuita. It is considered to be one of the oldest neighborhoods in El Paso, and it officially became an organized residential area in 1859. The neighborhood houses a number a historic buildings, the oldest dating back to 1879. It is often considered to be the birthplace of the city of El Paso.

This area has a rich history ranging from the Mexican Revolution on, but recently regained prominence in 2016 when the El Paso city government voted to demolish the neighborhood in favor of a new arena. Controversy, debate, and lawsuits have ensued since the city proposed the demolition, and historical preservationists and local activists have fought against city officials and property owners to oppose the new arena and have instead proposed for the neighborhood to be included in a new historical district.

== History ==
Before Europeans arrived, Manso people survived off the land in this area.

=== 1800s ===
Barrio Duranguito was settled in 1827 by Juan María Ponce de Leon when the wealthy merchant purchased 215 acres of land across the north bank of the Rio Grande for an ayuntamiento where he established a ranch consisting of farms and several adobe roundhouses. He sold the land to Benjamin Franklin Coons in 1849 and the property became known as Coons Ranch, in 1851 Ponce de Leon repossessed the land and it was handed to over to yet another owner after his death. In 1859s, this area was the first in El Paso to be platted by the surveyor Anson Mills who is credited with founding much of the city and with naming this little community "El Paso".

=== Early 1900s and the Mexican Revolution ===
The neighborhood got its current name early in the 1900s after it was proved by oral history testimonies that the area was named after Durango St. which is located within the neighborhood. The name can also be attributed to the large number of immigrants who came from the Mexican state of Durango and settled in the area. In 1905, El Paso had the largest Chinatown in Texas after 1200 Chinese migrants came to El Paso to work on the construction of the Southern Pacific Rail line that came into town in 1881.

Since the beginning of the Mexican Revolution in 1910, Barrio Duranguito immediately became a plotting ground for Mexican Revolutionaries. The area's close proximity to the border made it useful for smuggling and for writing radical newspapers. Mexican residents who had been displaced by the revolution moved to Duranguito and gave it much of the character that it still has today. Journalist Christopher Hooks for Texas Monthly acknowledged how this area is almost as important for Mexico as it is for the City of El Paso, noting how Mexican revolutionary Francisco Madero kept an office in Duranguito before he became President of Mexico. The famed Mexican revolutionary Pancho Villa was also known to frequent the area, as he spent his days there following his exile from Mexico.

=== 1965–present ===
As the 20th century progressed the neighborhood began to decline, and upon her arrival in 1965 current resident Antonia Morales described the area as "...very dirty, very ugly" and said "there were a lot of drugs, a lot of robbery, a lot of prostitution." Antonia together with her neighbors organized community meetings and began to clean up their neighborhood, and with the help of local activists began to petition for the city to put up street lights in the neighbor and pave the roads.

In 2006, officials from the City of El Paso met with the Paso del Norte Group, an invite-only collection of binational business leaders to come up with the "Downtown Plan" that dreamt of growing the prominence of the borderland. In 2012 the city voted to approve the construction of a new arena that was included in the Downtown Plan. In 2016 the city decided that the arena would be built in Duranguito, and that the neighborhood would be demolished. Residents were immediately opposed to the city's actions, but many left after the city offered them money to vacate the neighborhood. Grassroots organizations such as Paso del Sur began organizing protests and petitions to voice public support for preserving Duranguito. Architectural historian and professor at the University of Texas at El Paso, Max Grossman began a legal battle against the City in 2017 in hopes of preserving historical buildings in the area. In November 2017, the City put up fences around much of the neighborhood of Duranguito to prepare for its demolition and brought in bulldozers that began to partially demolish buildings even before the proper archeological studies of the area were made. In 2018 Grossman organized a conference to propose the development of an historic district in Duranguito that would preserve much of the buildings and housing in the neighborhood.

The conflict between preservationists and arena supporters was finally resolved in early January 2023 when El Paso's city council rejected locating the arena in the neighborhood in a narrow 4–3 vote with one abstention obligating the city to consider some other location near the city's downtown as authorized under the 2012 municipal bond election.

== Historic buildings ==
=== The Mansion House ===
This building is the last remaining frontier-era structure in El Paso. Completed in 1904, the brick and stucco building was used as a brothel and is a relic of the romanticized "old-west" period in Texas history. Max Grossman described it as serving as a community center, and a place where one could "hear live violin music." This building was also recommended to be recognized and placed on the National Register of Historic Places. The building is located at 306 West Overland Avenue and has Romanesque Revival features.

=== Chinese laundry building ===
This building is located at 216 W Overland Avenue and is one of the last remaining relics of the original Chinese immigrant community in Barrio Duranguito. It last operated as El Pisto Food and Drink from 2009 to 2011. The building was in the process of possibly being declared as an Historic Landmark by the Texas Historical Commission until the property owner William Abraham withdrew the building's bid in favor of the new arena that the city proposed.

=== Fire Station 11 ===
Completed on September 18, 1930, this fire station was designed by the architect Gustavus Trost. The Brick building is done in art deco style and is two stories tall, with three engine stations. The building is located on Paisano St. and Santa Fe St.

=== Pancho Villa Stash House (Casa Clandestina) ===
Built in 1897, this house, located at 1/2 331 Leon St., was used by the Mexican Revolutionary Pancho Villa to stash money, jewelry, ammunition, and more. In November 1915, the U.S. government raided the house and confiscated $30,000 in jewelry and hundreds of thousands of dollars in cash. The house is made out of adobe, and is one of the few buildings in the area to be spared from the city's plans for a new arena. The building is also one of the few in Duranguito that has been fully renovated.

=== Emporium Bar ===
The Emporium Bar was located at 423 South El Paso St. and was an important location during the Mexican Revolution. The location was a hangout for spies, journalists, revolutionaries, and even counter revolutionaries during the Mexican revolution. Pancho Villa was a frequent patron of the bar as he lived right next door at the Hotel Roma. In 2003, the building was razed to make way for a new Burger King and its parking lot.
