= 2013 El Paso mayoral election =

El Paso mayoral election, 2013
- May 11, 2013 (first round); June 15, 2013 (runoff)
- Turnout: 14.15% (first round); 13.76% (runoff)
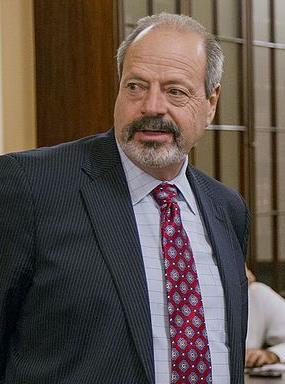

Candidate	Oscar Leeser	Steve Ortega	Robert Cormell
Party	Nonpartisan	Nonpartisan	Nonpartisan
First round vote	21,724	9,944	5,518
First round percentage	47.40%	21.70%	12.04%
Runoff vote	33,266	11,492
Runoff percentage	74.32%	25.68%
Candidate	Hector H. Lopez	L. Gus Haddad
Party	Nonpartisan	Nonpartisan
First round vote	4,009	3,223
First round percentage	8.75%	7.03%
Mayor before election
John Cook
Democratic
Elected mayor
Oscar Leeser
Democratic

The 2013 El Paso mayoral election was held on May 11, 2013, to elect the Mayor of El Paso, Texas. Incumbent Mayor John Cook could not seek another term due to term limits. Businessman Oscar Leeser and El Paso city councilor Steve Ortega advanced to a runoff election on June 15. Leeser won the runoff election.

== First round ==
=== Candidates ===
==== Advanced to runoff ====
- Oscar Leeser, automobile dealer
- Steve Ortega, city representative

==== Eliminated ====
- Robert Cormell, restaurateur
- Hector H. Lopez, radio host
- L. Gus Haddad, mortgage broker
- Jaime O. Perez, former chief of staff to El Paso County Judge Anthony Cobos
- Dean Martinez, retired military
- Jorge Artalejo, substitute teacher

=== Results ===
El Paso mayoral primary results, May 11, 2013
Party	Candidate	Votes	%
Nonpartisan	Oscar Leeser	21,724	47.40
Nonpartisan	Steve Ortega	9,944	21.70
Nonpartisan	Robert Cormell	5,518	12.04
Nonpartisan	Hector H. Lopez	4,009	8.75
Nonpartisan	L. Gus Haddad	3,223	7.03
Nonpartisan	Jaime O. Perez	816	1.78
Nonpartisan	Dean Martinez	365	0.80
Nonpartisan	Jorge Artalejo	228	0.50
Total votes		45,827	100.00

== Runoff ==
=== Candidates ===
- Oscar Leeser, businessman
- Steve Ortega, City Councilman

=== Results ===
El Paso mayoral election results, June 15, 2013
Party	Candidate	Votes	%
Nonpartisan	Oscar Leeser	33,266	74.32%
Nonpartisan	Steve Ortega	11,492	25.68%
Total votes		44,758	100%
