= Claudia Ordaz =

Texas legislator

Member of the Texas House of Representatives from the 79th district
- Incumbent
- Assumed office January 10, 2023
- Preceded by: Art Fierro

Member of the Texas House of Representatives from the 76th district
- In office January 12, 2021 – January 10, 2023
- Preceded by: Cesar Blanco
- Succeeded by: Suleman Lalani

Personal details
- Born: Claudia Ordaz; January 13, 1986 (age 40) El Paso, Texas, U.S.
- Party: Democratic
- Spouse: Vince Perez (m. 2016; div. 2022)
- Education: University of Texas at El Paso (BA)

Claudia Ordaz (formerly Ordaz Perez; born January 13, 1986) is an American politician. As a member of the Democratic Party, she currently serves in the Texas House of Representatives for the 79th District of El Paso’s northeast and eastside, which includes the El Paso International Airport and Fort Bliss.

== Early life, education, and career ==
Ordaz is a graduate of local public schools. She graduated from Montwood High School. She then went on an attended the University of Texas at El Paso, where she received a BA in Political Science in 2008. Since then she served as the El Paso council member for District 6 of the city and was Mayor pro tempore at one point. She left the city council upon her election to the state legislature. She also was a press secretary for the United States House of Representatives in the 112th United States Congress and communications director for the Texas Senate. She also attended the Lyndon B. Johnson School of Public Affairs at the University of Texas at Austin.

Ordaz married then-El Paso County commissioner Vincent Perez in 2016, then filed for divorce from him in 2022.

== Elections ==
Ordaz was elected for El Paso City Council in 2014 in a special election for District 6, becoming the youngest elected official in the City of El Paso and resulting in the first-ever majority by female representatives on Council. She was re-elected in 2015 and 2018 with over 72 percent of the vote. Claudia announced in October 2019 to run for the Texas House of Representatives District 76th seat, that was being held by Cesar Blanco at the time. Blanco announced he would run for the 29th District in the Texas Senate, effectively vacating the seat. By announcing her run, she resigned her council seat. Claudia ran unopposed in the November 2020 election and defeated Elisa Tamayo earlier in the year in the primary election.

== Policy positions ==
=== Education ===
Ordaz is in favor of increasing funding for public schools, as well as long-term equitable funding. She believes that the state short-changed the local schools of El Paso and crippled the education system.

=== Healthcare ===
Ordaz supports expanding Medicaid to cover more low-income uninsured adults. She states that 1 in 3 adults in the city of El Paso are uninsured and hopes that expanding Medicaid would reduce the cost for tax payers in the long run by paying for uncompensated care.

=== Parental leave ===
Ordaz is in favor of parents spending time at home during the first months of parenting, as well as taking care of the elderly. While serving as a member of the El Paso City Council, she instituted a new parental leave policy that allows city employees to donate unused sick leave to new parents.

Texas House of Representatives
Preceded by Cesar Blanco	Member of the Texas House of Representatives from the 76th district 2021–present	Incumbent
