= William Sanders (businessman) =

American real estate businessman

- Born: William David Sanders; December 2, 1941 (age 84); Ramsey County, Minnesota, U.S.
- Education: Cornell University College of Agriculture and Life Sciences
- Occupation: Real estate developer
- Known for: Founder, LaSalle Partners
- Spouse: Louann H. Feuille (m. 1974)
- Children: 5
- Relatives: Beto O'Rourke (son-in-law)

William David Sanders (born December 2, 1941) is an American real estate businessman and developer.

== Biography ==
Sanders was born in 1941 in Ramsey County, Minnesota, the son of Marion Jane Birkenstein and David Edwin Sanders, an advertising agency owner. His father was born in Parral, Chihuahua, Mexico, to German Jewish immigrants. Sanders' maternal grandfather was born in Chicago to German Jewish parents while his maternal grandmother was also born in Chicago to Irish Catholic parents. He was raised in El Paso, Texas. In 1964, Sanders graduated from Cornell University College of Agriculture and Life Sciences. In 1968, he founded the real estate firm LaSalle Partners, headquartered in Chicago. In 1999, LaSalle Partners merged with Jones Lang Wooton to form Jones Lang LaSalle.

He served as chairman of the National Association of Real Estate Investment Trusts (NAREIT). In 1999, he received Cornell's "Entrepreneur of the Year" award.

Sanders once managed a real estate portfolio of $20 billion, and was referred to as the "Warren Buffett of real estate" by Bloomberg News in 1999.

== Personal life ==
Sanders married Louann H. Feuille on May 18, 1974 in El Paso. They have two sons and three daughters.

Sanders' middle daughter, Amy, is the wife of Beto O'Rourke, former Democratic U.S. Rep. of Texas's 16th congressional district.
