= Dee Margo =

American businessman and politician (born 1952)

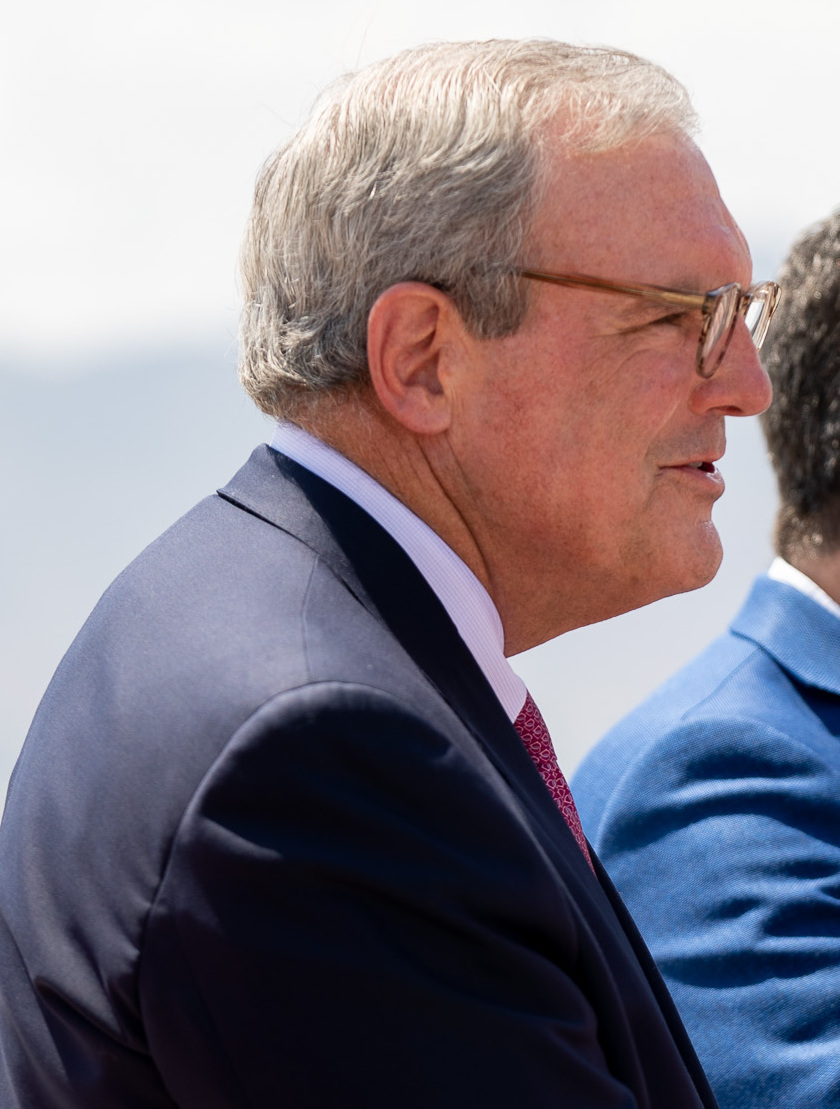

51st Mayor of El Paso
- In office June 26, 2017 – January 5, 2021
- Preceded by: Oscar Leeser
- Succeeded by: Oscar Leeser

Member of the Texas House of Representatives from the 78th district
- In office January 11, 2011 – January 8, 2013
- Preceded by: Joe Moody
- Succeeded by: Joe Moody

Personal details
- Born: Donald Margo; February 4, 1952 (age 74) Oklahoma City, Oklahoma, U.S.
- Party: Republican
- Spouse: Adair Margo (m. 1976)
- Education: Vanderbilt University (BA)

Donald "Dee" Margo (born February 4, 1952) is an American businessman and politician who served as the 51st mayor of El Paso, Texas from 2017 to 2021.

== Early life and education ==
Margo graduated from Huntsville High School in Huntsville, Alabama. He accepted a football scholarship to Vanderbilt University and graduated in 1974 with a degree in history and economics.

== Career ==
Margo moved to El Paso in 1977 from Nashville, Tennessee to join his father-in-law's insurance business, John D. Williams Company. In February 1981, six days after Margo’s 29th birthday, his father-in-law suffered a fatal heart attack. Margo purchased JDW from the estate and expanded the company from 6 employees to 70. In 2005, Margo was named chairman of the Greater El Paso Chamber of Commerce and in 2012 sold his company to HUB International.

From 2011 to 2013, Margo served in the Texas House of Representatives. He represented the 78th district, which covers parts of El Paso County, after defeating Texas state representative Joe Moody. Moody defeated Margo in a rematch in 2012. On June 10, 2017, he was elected mayor of El Paso after winning the runoff part of the city's mayoral election of 2017 against another Republican businessman, David Saucedo.

Margo was defeated for re-election running against former mayor Oscar Leeser in 2020.

== Personal life ==
Margo has been a resident of El Paso for over 40 years. He and his wife Adair, an El Paso native, married on August 21, 1976 and moved to El Paso in March 1977, where they raised their sons. Their granddaughters are fifth-generation El Pasoans.

== Electoral history ==
2017 El Paso mayoral election
Party	Candidate	Votes	%
Nonpartisan	Dee Margo	17,148	57.00%
Nonpartisan	David Saucedo	12,941	43.00%

2020 El Paso mayoral election
Party	Candidate	Votes	%
Nonpartisan	Oscar Leeser	42,895	79.54
Nonpartisan	Dee Margo (incumbent)	6,301	20.46

== See also ==
- List of mayors of the 50 largest cities in the United States

Political offices
Preceded by Oscar Leeser	Mayor of El Paso; 2017–2021	Succeeded by Oscar Leeser
