= Texas's 77th House of Representatives district =

American legislative district

Texas's 77th State House of Representatives district
Representative
Evelina Ortega; D–El Paso
- Demographics: 7.8% White; 2.9% Black; 88.3% Hispanic; 1.4% Asian
- Population (2020) • Voting age: 203,921; 158,812

The 77th district of the Texas House of Representatives consists of a portion of El Paso County. The current representative is Evelina Ortega, who has represented the district since 2017.
