= Texas Space Commission =

State agency of the Government of Texas

The Texas Space Commission is a state agency of the Government of Texas. It was founded by governor of Texas Greg Abbott at Johnson Space Center in Houston on March 26, 2024.

The Commission issues the Space Exploration and Aeronautics Research Fund (SEARF) to "businesses, nonprofits, and governmental entities (including institutions of higher education) involved in the space exploration research or aeronautics industry".
