= Oscar Leeser =

American politician

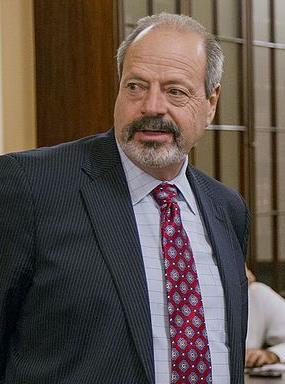
- Leeser in 2014

50th and 52nd Mayor of El Paso
- In office January 5, 2021 – January 6, 2025
- Preceded by: Dee Margo
- Succeeded by: Renard Johnson
- In office June 24, 2013 – June 26, 2017
- Preceded by: John Cook
- Succeeded by: Dee Margo

Personal details
- Born: May 7, 1958 (age 68) Chihuahua, Mexico
- Party: Democratic

Oscar Leeser (born May 7, 1958) is an American politician who served as the 52nd mayor of El Paso, Texas from 2021 to 2025. A member of the Democratic Party, he previously served as the 50th mayor from 2013 to 2017.

== Early life and education ==
Oscar Leeser was born in Chihuahua, Mexico. In 1967. At the age of 9, he arrived in El Paso along with his six siblings. He graduated from Coronado High School in El Paso, Texas. Leeser worked alongside his father Arthur Leeser for 31 years at the Hyundai dealership in El Paso. Leeser's mother, Rhoberta was well known for saying "My Oscar, he's such a good boy" in the dealership's commercials.

=== Religion ===
Leeser is Jewish. His family is buried at Temple Mount Sinai Cemetery.

== Career ==
=== Business ===
Following graduation from high school, Leeser began his career in the auto industry, working with several dealerships in El Paso for over three decades. Leeser was given a career opportunity in 2001, when he became president and dealer operator of Hyundai of El Paso. He had turned a local store that was only selling 15 cars a month into the number one overall dealer in El Paso. His store also became the number one Hyundai dealer in the South Central Region and ninth in the United States for Hyundai dealers.

=== Mayor of El Paso ===
Leeser first served as mayor of El Paso from 2013 to 2017, and then took a break from public life due to health issues. He ran for office again in 2020, and assumed office on January 5, 2021.

==== 2013 election ====
Leeser ran against then-city councilmember Steve Ortega, but initially failed to garner enough votes to meet the 50% voting threshold. There was a runoff election where Leeser won 74% of the votes, defeating Ortega. He assumed office on June 23, 2013.

==== 2020 election ====
Leeser was a candidate for mayor again in the 2020 election. He received the largest share of the vote in the November general election, and was elected to a second term after defeating Dee Margo in the December runoff election.

== Mayoral Powers ==
El Paso officially utilizes a council-manager government type which is affiliated with weaker ceremonial mayors with few to no formal powers differentiating them from city council members. However, El Paso's charter bestows the mayor with several privileges associated with mayor-council and strong mayor systems. Accordingly, the mayor has the ability to veto any legislation put forward by the city council with the exception of measures seeking to remove the city manager or city attorney. Beyond this power, Leeser possesses duties commonly held by mayors of both types those being the responsibility to act on the behalf of the city when dealing with the state and federal government, the ability to make yearly state of the city addresses, and break tie votes. Additionally, the mayor is able to appoint individuals to certain positions however, appointments to key posts, such as chief of police, are instead made by the city manager.

=== Veto of Certificate of Obligation ===
In August 2021, Leeser vetoed a $96 million certificate of obligation bill passed 6-2 by the El Paso city council. Leeser cited fiscal responsibility and the will of the people as reasons for vetoing the measure. In response, city council member Cassandra Hernandez refuted Leeser's claim that it was the will of the people, citing the need for infrastructure repair. El Paso County, Texas judge Ricardo Samaniego, supported Leeser's veto by calling it a "sound decision". Funds from the certificate of obligation would have gone towards parks, the El Paso Zoo, and the Mexican American Cultural Center.

== Curfew ==
In August 2023, Leeser elected to perpetuate an 11 p.m. curfew for adolescents in public locations that has existed in El Paso in some capacity since 1991. This was accomplished by vetoing the unanimous decision of the city council to terminate the ordinance. The proposal to eliminate the curfew ordinance was intended to align the city with House Bill 1819, a piece of state legislation that came into effect less than a month later on September 1, 2023, that abolished cities' and counties' ability to impose current or implement new curfews on their populace. Therefore, in spite of the veto, El Paso's local rules were overrode and in order to abide by state law the curfew ended. However, the mayor and other advocates of the curfew pledged to petition the state government, alongside the representatives of similarly minded municipalities, to reverse this mandate.

== Immigration ==
State of Emergency

In April 2023, Leeser joined mayors of other border cities, such as Brownsville, Texas, and declared a state of emergency in El Paso in preparation for the expiration of Title 42 expulsion on May 11. The state of emergency could only stand on its own for seven days, at which point it had to be approved for extension by the El Paso City Council. Leeser declared the state of emergency because it allowed the city to gain access to federal funds, which would help the city open and operate migrant shelters and clear the streets. The shelters are intended to be temporary housing for immigrants while they make their way to their long-term destination. The state of emergency began on May 1, 2023, and lasted until May 8, 2023. At the same news conference where the state of emergency was declared, Leeser stated that temporary, public shelter would be provided to the migrants, and highlighted that the migrants could not camp on the streets, as they did in the fall of 2022.

In September 2023, facing another influx of migrants and asylum-seekers, Leeser held a news conference stating the city had the capacity to shelter the incoming migrants. He added as well that the asylum-seekers did not intend to stay long in El Paso as they moved on to their destinations across the country, but that the city had the ability to provide the resources needed for their journeys. Leeser has stated that the federal government has been very helpful amidst the ongoing border crisis, but admits that there needs to be systemic change.

Shelters for Migrants

In September 2023, Leeser supported the purchase of the abandoned Morehead Middle School from the El Paso Independent School District for $3.8 million. Leeser cited the steep price of housing migrants in hotels as support for the purchase of the school. The middle school will be purchased with federal COVID-19 and Federal Emergency Management Agency funds. The president of a local neighborhood association raised fears about having a migrant shelter near the Charles Q. Murphree School, which is still in operation. The neighborhood association president suggested that the school district instead sell the school to a private company so it can generate tax revenue.

Migrant Busing

In 2022, the state of Texas began sending buses of migrants around the country. Leeser followed suit in July 2022, and offered free trips to Chicago, Illinois or New York City, New York. While completely voluntary, asylum-seekers were strongly encouraged to take the trips, and those who didn't were forced to reside in shelters across the city or on the streets.

Leeser, along with Deputy City Manager Mario D'Agostino, restarted migrant busing efforts in September 2023. There are a total of five charter buses for asylum-seekers with destinations in New York City, New York; Denver, Colorado; and Chicago, Illinois. Leeser stated that the charter buses for asylum-seekers are voluntary and they choose which city they would like transportation to.

== Duranguito ==
The conflict surrounding the demolition of the Duranguito neighborhood was resolved in January 2023 by a city council vote rejecting the proposal. In September 2023, the El Paso city council voted to have Leeser send a letter to the Texas Historical Commission which proposes that the neighborhood be nominated to be part of the Downtown El Paso Historic District. This letter would supersede one sent by former mayor Dee Margo, which called to exclude the neighborhood from the National Register of Historic Places. Leeser alone can choose when the letter can be sent.

Leeser has stated that despite not moving forward with the demolition of the Duranguito neighborhood for the multipurpose center, he was adamant that the city would find another area for the project to go forward. He also stated that the funds could be used to upgrade the existing El Paso Convention Center.

== City Manager Termination and Search ==
Tommy Gonzalez was El Paso’s city manager since 2014, however, there was much controversy surrounding his contract, because it gave him $425,000 annually, on top of a monthly vehicle allocation, health and life insurance, and a retirement plan. In February 2023, the city council was split 4-4 on whether to terminate Gonzalez’s contract without good cause. Due to the tie, Leeser cast the deciding vote to terminate. Ending Gonzalez’s contract was a topic that Leeser campaigned on during his 2020 campaign. In March, Leeser both nominated and advocated for Cary Westin to take over the position as Interim City Manager. The city council then approved the appointment.

== Personal Loss and COVID-19 Impact ==
In December 2020, Leeser faced a personal loss with the passing of his brother and his mother. George Ira Leeser and Rhoberta Leeser both died with complications from COVID-19 in 2020. In 2021 Leeser contacted Texas Governor Greg Abbott for the authority to continue the mask mandates. Leeser followed the guidelines of the CDC and the government mandates during this time. There were calls for an audit of the COVID-19 vaccine procedure in El Paso, Leeser denied this audit.

== Electoral history ==
2013 El Paso mayoral election
Party	Candidate	Votes	%
Nonpartisan	Oscar Leeser	33,269	74.32
Nonpartisan	Steve Ortega	11,493	25.68
Total votes		44,762	100

2020 El Paso mayoral election
Party	Candidate	Votes	%
Nonpartisan	Oscar Leeser	42,895	79.54
Nonpartisan	Dee Margo (incumbent)	6,301	20.46
Total votes		53,929	100

Political offices
Preceded by John Cook	Mayor of El Paso; 2013–2017	Succeeded by Dee Margo
Preceded by Dee Margo	Mayor of El Paso; 2021–2025	Succeeded by Renard Johnson
