= Texas's 79th House of Representatives district =

American legislative district

Texas's 79th State House of Representatives district
Representative
Claudia Ordaz; D–El Paso
- Demographics: 12.9% White; 5.5% Black; 79.7% Hispanic; 2.4% Asian
- Population (2020) • Voting age: 201,379; 154,313

The 79th district of the Texas House of Representatives consists of a portion of El Paso County. The current representative is Claudia Ordaz, who has represented the district since 2023, when she was redistricted from the 76th district.
