= Evelina Ortega =

American politician

Member of the Texas House of Representatives from the 77th district
- In office January 10, 2017 – January 14, 2025
- Preceded by: Marisa Marquez
- Succeeded by: Vincent Perez

Personal details
- Born: August 18, 1955 (age 71) El Paso, Texas, U.S.
- Party: Democratic
- Education: University of Texas at El Paso; University of Texas School of Law
- Occupation: Attorney
- Website: www.linafortexas.com

Evelina "Lina" Ortega is an American politician who served as a Democratic member of the Texas House of Representatives, representing the 77th District. She won the November 2016 general election and was sworn into office on January 10, 2017. In 2020, she was reelected after running uncontested.
