= Willie Cager =

American basketball player (1942–2023)

Personal information
- Born: August 24, 1942 The Bronx, New York, U.S.
- Died: March 19, 2023 (aged 80) El Paso, Texas, U.S.
- Listed height: 6 ft 5 in (1.96 m)

Career information
- College: UTEP (1965–1968)
- NBA draft: 1968: 12th round, 151st overall pick
- Drafted by: Baltimore Bullets
- Position: Forward

Career highlights
- NCAA champion (1966)
- Stats at Basketball Reference

William Cager Jr. (August 24, 1942 – March 19, 2023) was an American college basketball player for the Texas Western Miners (now UTEP Miners). He was a member of their 1966 team that won the 1966 NCAA Basketball Championship. He was coached by the Hall of Fame coach Don Haskins. Texas Western started an all-black starting lineup, against the all-white University of Kentucky. In Texas Western's championship game victory, Cager had eight points and six rebounds. The school's website describes him as "A skilled low post player" during his career. Raised in New York City, Cager was nicknamed "Scoops". He suffered from a heart murmur during the 1965–66 season; when he recovered enough to play, Texas Western was forced to use him sparingly, in four-minute shifts. After playing at Texas Western, Cager was drafted by the Baltimore Bullets in the 12th round of the 1968 NBA draft. However, partly due to his health, he never played as a professional.

Cager resided in El Paso, Texas, and had three children: a pair of sons and a daughter. In El Paso, he worked for the Ysleta Independent School District's after school basketball program as a coordinator. He had a charitable foundation, the Willie Cager Foundation, which aims to fund building construction in El Paso.

Forty years after Texas Western's 1966 championship, the film Glory Road was released. Damaine Radcliff played Cager in the movie.

In 2017, Cager sought the position of Mayor of El Paso.

Cager died in El Paso on the anniversary of the 1966 national championship game on March 19, 2023, at the age of 80.
