= Seitlinger =

Seitlinger is a surname. Notable people with the name include:

- Jean Seitlinger (1924–2018), French politician
  - Vincent Seitlinger (his son) (born 1987), French politician

== See also ==
- Ralph Seitsinger
