= Fort Bliss National Cemetery =

Historic veterans cemetery in El Paso County, Texas

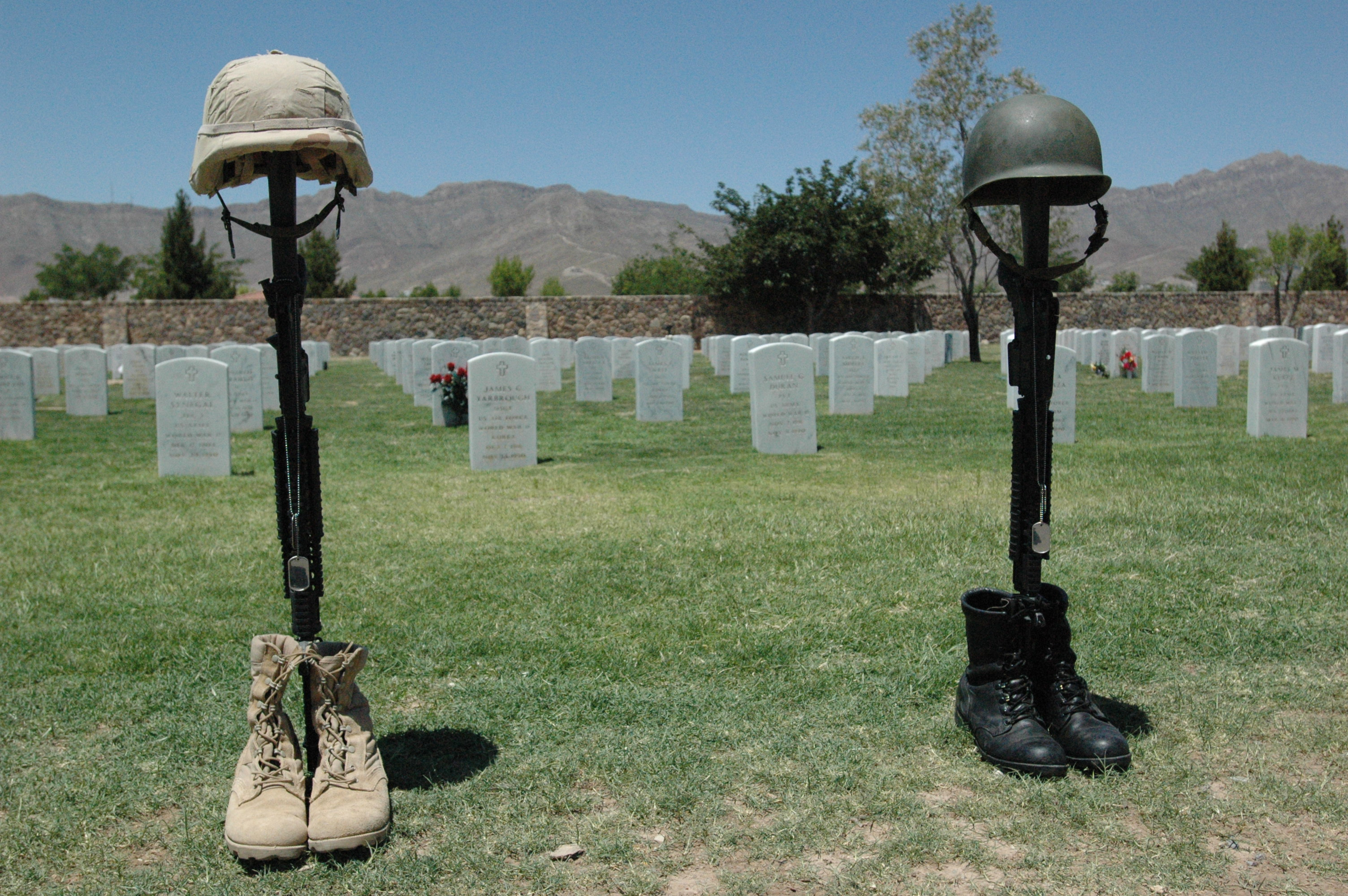
- Traditional rifle, helmet, and boots memorial honor at Fort Bliss National Cemetery
- Interactive map of Fort Bliss National Cemetery

Details
- Established: 1894
- Location: 5200 Fred Wilson Blvd., El Paso, Texas
- Country: United States
- Coordinates: 31°49′23″N 106°25′28″W
- Type: Veteran
- Owned by: U.S. Dept. of Veterans Affairs
- Website: Fort Bliss National Cemetery
- Find a Grave: Fort Bliss National Cemetery
- Fort Bliss National Cemetery
- U.S. National Register of Historic Places
- Location within Texas Location within the United States
- MPS: Inter-World War National Cemeteries, 1934–1939
- NRHP reference No.: 16000066
- Added to NRHP: March 8, 2016

Fort Bliss National Cemetery is a United States National Cemetery in West Texas, located at Fort Bliss, a U.S. Army post adjacent to the city of El Paso. Administered by the Department of Veterans Affairs, it encompasses 82.1 acres (33.2 ha), and as of 2014, had over 50,000 interments. It was listed on the National Register of Historic Places in 2016.

== History ==
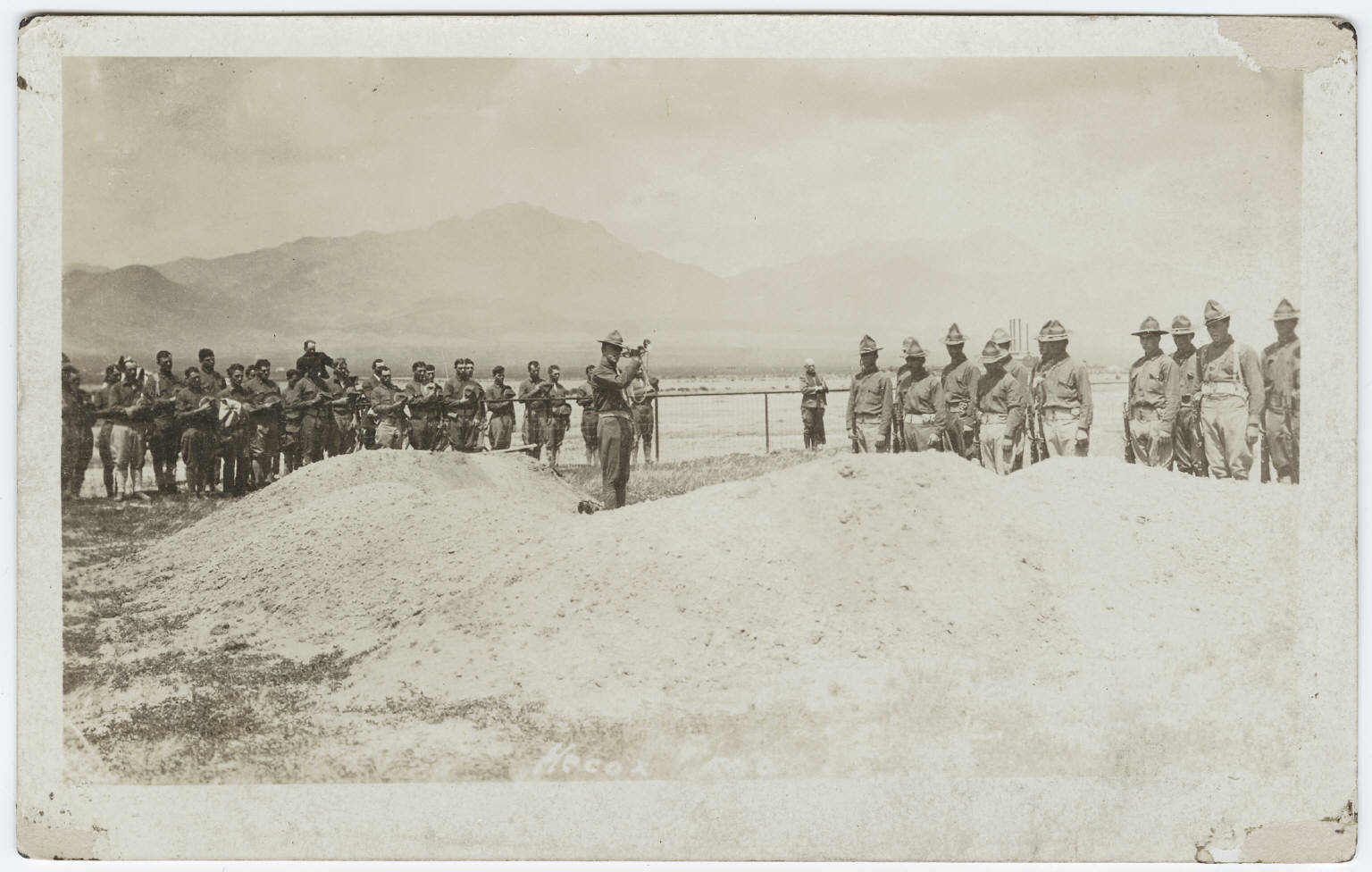
A bugler at a military funeral at a Ft. Bliss Post Cemetery

Fort Bliss itself was not established until the 1840s, but burials were made in the area of the cemetery as early as 1833. The fort was used as a Confederate infantry post during the Civil War, a cavalry post for training during World War I, and then became a demobilization camp after the war. Before Ft. Bliss was moved, soldiers were buried at what is now Cleveland Square and the downtown El Paso Public Library. Union soldiers buried there were removed and reburied at Fort Snelling in 1883. In 1893, this former Ft. Bliss cemetery was granted to the City of El Paso.

In 1894, the area where the cemetery is currently located was designated as the Fort Bliss Post Cemetery. In 1914, the cemetery measured just 2.2 acres (0.89 ha); an additional 2.2 acres were added during the war. In 1939, funds were allocated for improvements and plans were approved to designate it a national cemetery.

In addition to being the final resting place of American soldiers, Fort Bliss National Cemetery was chosen by the Chinese government as the place of interment for 52 Republic of China Air Force cadets who died while training at the fort in 1944. Several German prisoners of war, and three Japanese civilians who were transferred from a cemetery in Lordsburg, New Mexico were also interred here, as were a German scientist who died while participating in research projects at Fort Bliss during World War II and an officer of the British Royal Air Force who served during that same war.

In order to make way for new construction in the central business district in New Orleans, Louisiana in 1955, the remains of the Fort's namesake Lieutenant Colonel William Wallace Smith Bliss (1815–1853) were disinterred from Girod Street Cemetery in New Orleans and brought to Fort Bliss, along with the monument erected in his memory.

In June 1973, the Veterans Administration took over operational duties of the cemetery. During the 1990s, twenty acres were added to the cemetery which were given by the Department of the Army.

In 2002, the cemetery was using 90 million gallons of water a year to keep the grass in the area green. Plans for xeriscaping the cemetery began discussion in 2002. The xeriscaping was opposed by many because it was felt that xeriscaping looked less dignified or respectful, according to the El Paso Times. In 2007, the cemetery was xeriscaped with a budget of $4.2 million to convert the land. William F. Tuerk, director of the National Cemetery Administration oversaw the change. In 2013, the cemetery won the Texas Environmental Excellence Award because it was saving an average of $400,000 a year because of cutting costs for water and grass upkeep. In 2013, around 100 graves began to sink in the cemetery due to heavy rainfall in the area. Eventually, 1,300 graves were damaged, prompting geologists, Diane Doser and Lixin Jin and Representative Joe Moody to investigate the cause of the problem at the cemetery.

== Notable monuments ==
- A monument dedicated to the United States Coast Guard and Navy personnel who died in the attack on Pearl Harbor, erected by Pearl Harbor Survivors Association in 1984.
- The Military Order of the World Wars, a monument dedicated to the officers in military service, erected in 1986.
- The American Prisoners of War Monument, dedicated to all prisoners of war, erected in 1986.

== Notable interments ==
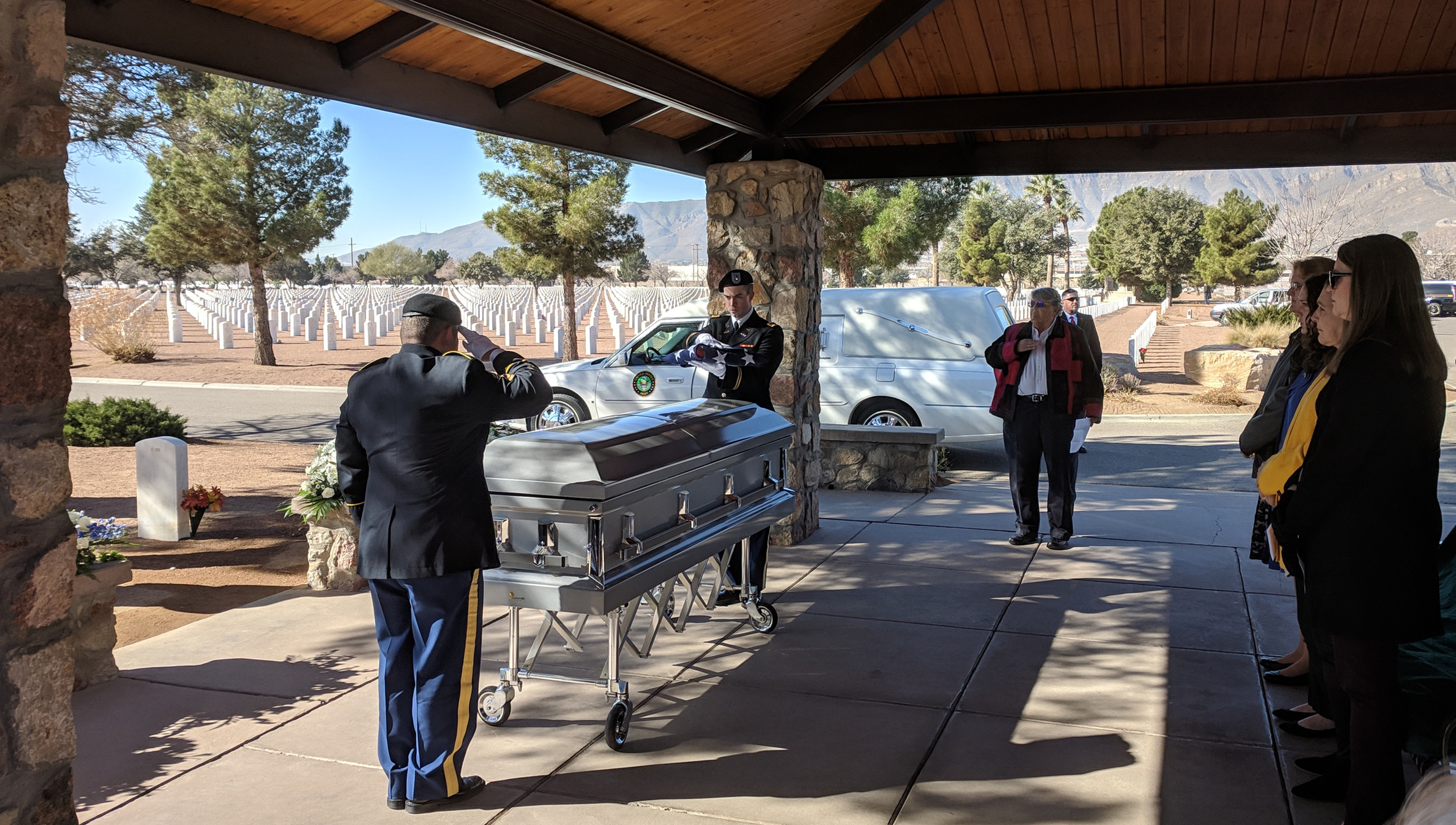
Burial ceremony for a World War II veteran, January 2019

=== Medal of Honor recipients ===
- Corporal Frank Bratling (1845–1873), for action in New Mexico Territory during the Indian Wars (cenotaph)
- Master Sergeant Victor Hugo Espinoza (1928–1986), for action in the Korean War
- Staff Sergeant Ambrosio Guillen (1929–1953), for action in the Korean War
- Private George Hooker (1847–1873), for action in Arizona Territory during the Indian Wars (cenotaph)
- Corporal Benito Martinez (1932–1952), for action in the Korean War

=== Others ===
- Manuel Gregorio Acosta-Chicano artist
- Major General Terry de la Mesa Allen Sr. (1888–1969), decorated World War I veteran and World War II division commander
- Lieutenant Colonel William Wallace Smith Bliss (1815–1853), Adjutant General of the Western Division of the Army in 1850, married the youngest daughter of President Zachary Taylor
- Major General Arthur H. Butler (1903–1972), veteran of Banana Wars and World War II, Navy Cross recipient
- Lieutenant General Hobart R. Gay (1894–1983), World War II general and Korean War division commander
- Daniel Richard "Dan" Haggerty (1948–2013), Vietnam War veteran and member of the El Paso County Commissioner's Court
- Sherman Hemsley (1938–2012), actor and United States Air Force veteran
- Jan Herring (1923–2000), artist and veteran of the Army Nurse Corps
- Brigadier General S.L.A. Marshall (1900–1977), military historian and author
- Ray Salazar (1931–2016), former Mayor of El Paso (1977–1979)
- Colonel John Stapp (1910–1999), M.D., Ph.D., pioneer in studying the effects of acceleration and deceleration forces on humans
- Goose Tatum (1921–1967), Harlem Globetrotters star and World War II Army Air Force veteran
- General George V. Underwood Jr. (1913–1984), Commander in Chief, US Southern Command
- Sergeant Major of the Army (SMA) William O. Wooldridge (1922–2012), first Sergeant Major of the Army

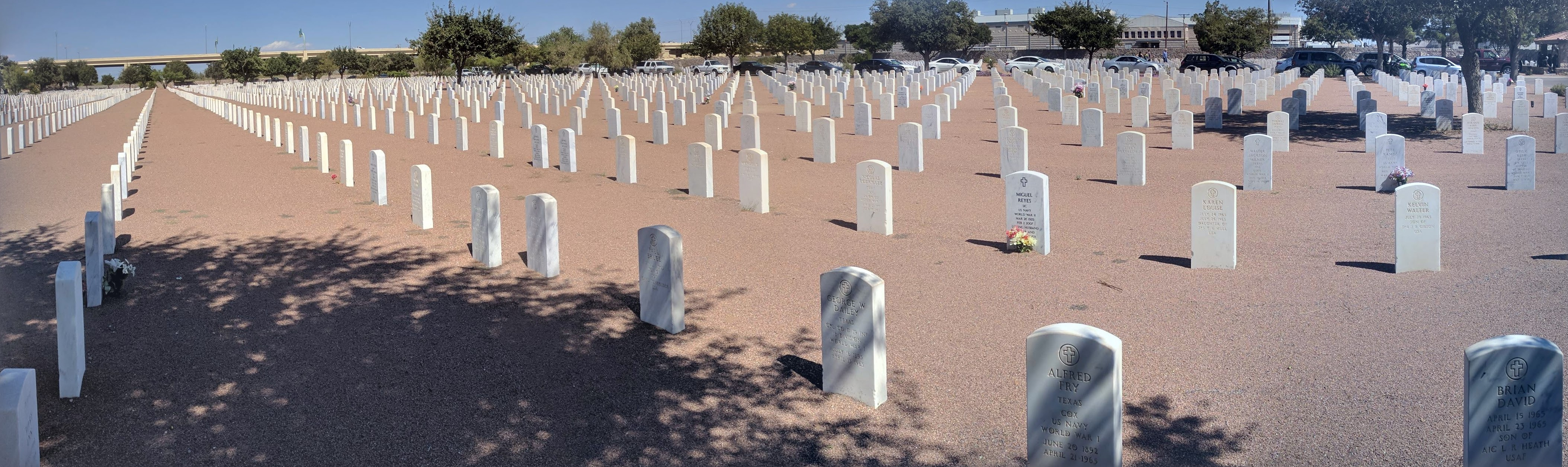
Panoramic view of a northeast portion of the cemetery
