= Raymond Caballero =

American lawyer and politician

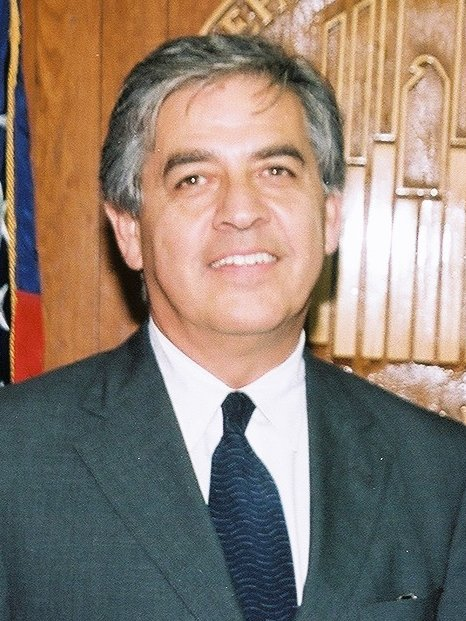

47th Mayor of El Paso
- In office June 9, 2001 – June 10, 2003
- Preceded by: Carlos Ramirez
- Succeeded by: Joe Wardy

Personal details
- Born: February 6, 1942 (age 84)
- Profession: Attorney

Raymond Caballero (born February 6, 1942) is an American lawyer and politician who served as the 47th mayor of El Paso from 2001 to 2003.

He was elected in May 2001, defeating former mayor Larry Francis in a runoff election with 62.5% of the vote. He was the fourth Latino mayor of El Paso, following Raymond Telles (first elected 1957), Ray Salazar (1977) and Carlos Ramirez (1997).

== Policies ==
In 2001, Caballero ran for mayor on a progressive platform in favor of expanding public transportation and municipal parklands and bringing renewal to long-neglected areas in the central city. Caballero became controversial for his criticism of local industries and home developers for alleged practices such as urban sprawl and pollution. Initially, Caballero had wide support, however over time voters increasingly questioned his stand, as El Paso is a relatively poor and economically disadvantaged city, and many felt the industries that Caballero opposed brought needed jobs.

In 2003 Caballero was defeated by Joe Wardy, a businessman, after one term in office. Caballero's supporters continue to form a strong faction within city politics.
