= 2005 El Paso mayoral election =

El Paso mayoral election, 2005
- May 7, 2005 (first-round); June 5, 2005 (runoff)
- Turnout: 11.14% (first-round); 13.16% (runoff)
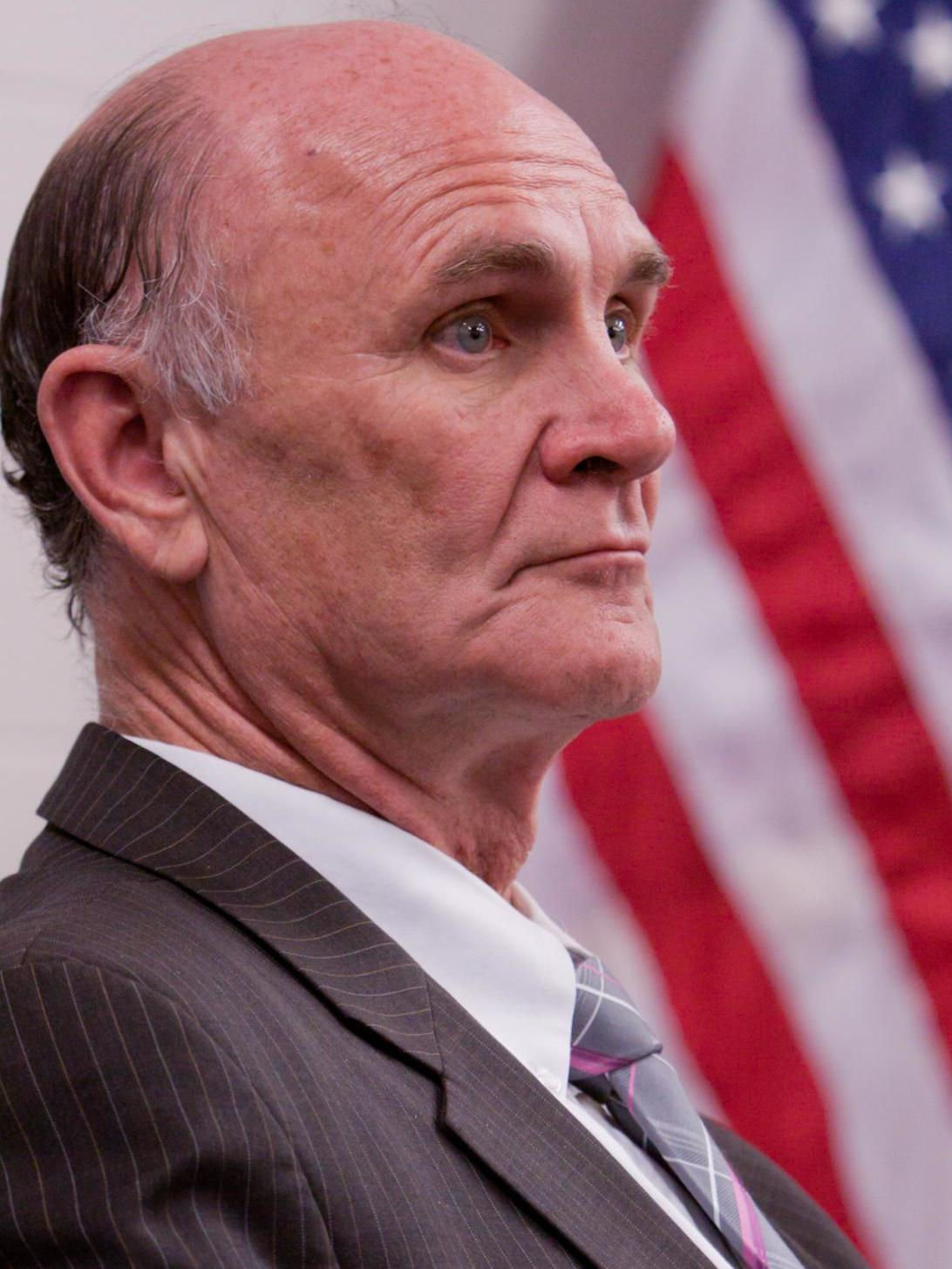

Candidate	John Cook	Joe Wardy	Carmen Rodriguez
Party	Nonpartisan	Nonpartisan	Nonpartisan
First round vote	13,347	18,281	6,549
First round percentage	33.51%	45.89%	16.44
Runoff vote	21,088	20,017
Runoff percentage	51.30%	48.70%
Mayor before election
Joe Wardy
Elected mayor
John Cook
Democratic

The 2005 El Paso mayoral election was held on May 7 and June 6, 2005, to elect the mayor of El Paso, Texas. It saw the election of John Cook, who unseated incumbent mayor Joe Wardy.

This was the first election held for a newly extended four-year term, as previous elections had been to two-year terms.

== Results ==
=== First-round ===
First-round
Party	Candidate	Votes	%
Nonpartisan	Joe Wardy (incumbent)	18,281	45.89
Nonpartisan	John Cook	13,347	33.51
Nonpartisan	Carmen Rodriguez	6,549	16.44
Nonpartisan	Jaime O. Perez	1,134	2.85
Nonpartisan	Matt Carroll	523	1.31
Total votes		39,834	

=== Runoff ===
Runoff
Party	Candidate	Votes	%
Nonpartisan	John Cook	21,088	51.30
Nonpartisan	Joe Wardy (incumbent)	20,017	48.70
Total votes		41,105	
