= Ray Salazar =

American military personnel

40th Mayor of El Paso
- In office 1977–1979
- Preceded by: Don Henderson
- Succeeded by: Tom Westfall

Personal details
- Born: August 25, 1931 El Paso, Texas
- Died: April 28, 2016 (aged 84)
- Spouse: Dolores Salazar
- Education: Texas Western College
- Profession: Accountant

Reynaldo "Ray" Salazar (August 25, 1931 – April 28, 2016) was an American accountant, politician and veteran of the United States Navy, who served as the Mayor of El Paso, Texas, from 1977 until 1979. Salazar was El Paso's second Hispanic mayor, following Raymond Telles, who had previously held the office from 1957 to 1961.

== Biography ==
Salazar was born in El Paso, Texas, in 1931 to Guadalupe Chaparro (Raul) and Reynaldo Salazar. He was one of four children, including a brother, Frank Salazar Sr., and two sisters, Olga and Alice. He graduated from El Paso High School in 1949, enlisted in the United States Navy for four years, and served in the Korean War. During the 1950s, Salazar enrolled in Texas Western College (now known as the University of Texas at El Paso) during the 1950s, and graduated with a Bachelor of Business Administration (BBA) in accounting in 1957. He was a certified public accountant by profession.

In 1977, Salazar was elected Mayor of El Paso, defeating incumbent Mayor Don Henderson. He served in office for one term from 1977 to 1979. He oversaw the construction of the new, present-day El Paso City Hall, which was constructed near Union Plaza.

As mayor, Salazar opposed a proposed border fence along the U.S.-Mexico border between El Paso and Ciudad Juarez. In "The Cactus Curtain", an article published in Texas Monthly in 1977, explained his opposition to the barrier, telling the magazine, "We don't want a Berlin Wall between our two cities...Besides, a seventeen-mile fence won’t keep illegal aliens out. They’ll just go to the end of the fence and come in around it. If the fence runs the entire two thousand miles from Chula Vista to Brownsville, they'll just cut holes in it. There's no way a barrier like that can be maintained without spending millions and millions of dollars. And the only result is going to be increased hostilities between neighbors."

Salazar ran for a second term, but was defeated for re-election by Tom Westfall in the 1979 mayoral election. he largely stayed out of local politics until the late 1990s, when he made an unsuccessful run for El Paso County judge.

In 2013, Salazar filed a lawsuit to block the demolition of the former City Hall, which was slated to be torn down to construct Southwest University Park, a minor league baseball stadium. In the lawsuit, which was filed against city Reps. Cortney Niland and Steve Ortega and then-City Manager Joyce Wilson, Salazar alleged that the officials had misused public funds to build the new stadium. Salazar also requested a review of city Rep. Ortega's income taxes for the prior three years. His lawsuit was later dismissed and the old City Hall was imploded in April 2013.

Ray Salazar died from heart complications on April 28, 2016, at the age of 84. He was survived by his wife of 61 years, Dolores Salazar, and their seven children - Debra Kosich, Susan Bullard, Michael Salazar, Mark Salazar, Linda King, Matthew Salazar and Martin Salazar; as well as his two sisters. His funeral was held at St. Patrick Cathedral in El Paso, with burial at Fort Bliss National Cemetery.

Salazar died less than one month after the passing of another former El Paso Mayor, Ralph Seitsinger, in March 2016 at the age of 100.
