= 2003 El Paso mayoral election =

El Paso mayoral election, 2003
- May 3, 2003
- Turnout: 14.79%

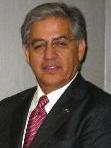
Candidate	Joe Wardy	Raymond Caballero
Party	Nonpartisan	Nonpartisan
Popular vote	29,890	18,394
Percentage	58.35%	35.91%
Mayor before election
Raymond Caballero
Elected mayor
Joe Wardy

The 2003 El Paso mayoral election was held on May 3, 2003, to elect the mayor of El Paso, Texas. It saw the election of Joe Wardy, who unseated incumbent mayor Raymond Caballero.

This was the first El Paso mayoral election held under new rules which saw a shift from the previous system under which a nonpartisan primary was followed by a general election of the top-two finishers to a new system in which a runoff is held only if no candidate receives a majority of the vote in the first round. This was the last El Paso mayoral election to a two-year term, as terms were to be extended to four-years beginning with the subsequent 2005 election.

No runoff was required, as Wardy secured a majority of the vote in the initial round.

== Results ==
Results
Party	Candidate	Votes	%
Nonpartisan	Joe Wardy	29,890	58.35
Nonpartisan	Raymond Caballero (incumbent)	18,394	35.91
Nonpartisan	Jaime O. Perez	1,032	2.01
Nonpartisan	Ray Graham	683	1.33
Nonpartisan	Lee White	270	0.53
Nonpartisan	Bernie Molina Canton	214	0.42
Nonpartisan	Carl Munoz Starr	189	0.37
Total votes		50,672	
