= Moselle's 5th constituency =

Constituency of the National Assembly of France

5th constituency of Moselle
- inline Constituency of the National Assembly of France

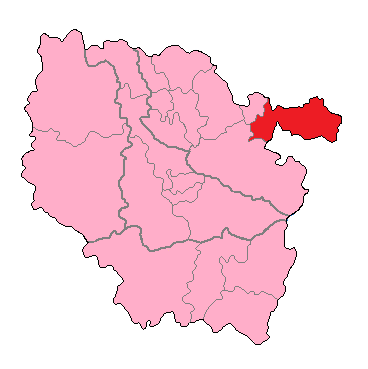
- Moselle's 5th Constituency shown within Lorraine
- Deputy: Pascal Jenft; RN
- Department: Moselle
- Cantons: Bitche, Rohrbach-lès-Bitche, Sarralbe, Sarreguemines, Sarreguemines-Campagne, Volmunster.
- Registered voters: 74,623

The 5th constituency of Moselle is a French legislative constituency in the Moselle département.

== Description ==
The 5th Constituency of Moselle occupies a finger of territory jutting eastwards from the main body of the Department, bordered to the north by Germany and to the south by Bas-Rhin. Almost entirely rural the constituency includes a large part of the Northern Vosges Regional Natural Park.

Until 2017, the seat elected conservatives throughout the Fifth Republic save for between 1997 and 2002 when Socialist Gilbert Maurer captured it.

== Historic Representation ==
| Election | Member | Party |
|---|---|---|
| 1958 | Jean Seitlinger | MRP |
| 1962 | Etienne Hinsberger | UNR |
| 1967 | Etienne Hinsberger | UDR |
| 1968 | Etienne Hinsberger | UDR |
| 1973 | Jean Seitlinger | UDF |
| 1978 | Jean Seitlinger | UDF |
| 1981 | Jean Seitlinger | UDF |
| 1986 | Proportional representation – no election by constituency | |
| 1988 | Jean Seitlinger | UDF |
| 1993 | Jean Seitlinger | UDF |
| 1997 | Gilbert Maurer | PS |
| 2002 | Céleste Lett | UMP |
| 2007 | Céleste Lett | UMP |
| 2012 | Céleste Lett | UMP |
| 2017 | Nicole Gries-Trisse | LREM |
| 2022 | Vincent Seitlinger | LR |
| 2024 | Pascal Jenft | RN |

== Election results ==
=== 2024 ===
Legislative Election 2024: Moselle's 5th constituency
| Party | Candidate | Votes | % | ±% |
|---|---|---|---|---|
| LFI (NFP) | Lisa Lahore | 5,439 | 12.38 | −2.17 |
| REG | Denis Lieb | 1,128 | 2.57 | N/A |
| DLF | Hervé Hocquet | 552 | 1.26 | −0.77 |
| RN | Pascal Jenft | 20,884 | 47.52 | +21.67 |
| LO | Gilles Sebastian | 453 | 1.03 | −0.61 |
| LR | Vincent Seitlinger | 15,045 | 34.23 | +9.70 |
| REC | Stéphane Marchand | 449 | 1.02 | −3.65 |
| Turnout | | 43,950 | 97.41 | +56.46 |
| Registered electors | | 72,095 | | |
2nd round result
| RN | Pascal Jenft | 23,584 | 52.64 | +5.12 |
| LR | Vincent Seitlinger | 21,219 | 47.36 | +13.13 |
| Turnout | | 44,803 | 96.68 | −0.43 |
| Registered electors | | 72,102 | | |
| RN gain from LR | | | | |

=== 2022 ===
Legislative Election 2022: Moselle's 5th constituency
| Party | Candidate | Votes | % | ±% |
|---|---|---|---|---|
| RN | Marie-Claude Voinçon | 7,498 | 25.88 | +8.64 |
| LR (UDC) | Vincent Seitlinger | 7,108 | 24.53 | -17.39 |
| LREM (Ensemble) | Nicole Trisse | 6,802 | 23.48 | −0.99 |
| LFI (NUPÉS) | Caroline Racine | 4,216 | 14.55 | +2.95 |
| REC | Sabrina Sellini | 1,354 | 4.67 | N/A |
| DIV | François Bourbeau | 930 | 3.21 | N/A |
| DLF (UPF) | Brigitte Toussaint | 589 | 2.03 | +0.59 |
| LO | Sébastien Ollier | 474 | 1.64 | +0.95 |
| Turnout | | 28,971 | 40.95 | −3.04 |
2nd round result
| LR (UDC) | Vincent Seitlinger | 16,413 | 59.12 | +10.63 |
| RN | Marie-Claude Voinçon | 11,348 | 40.88 | N/A |
| Turnout | | 27,761 | 40.29 | −0.96 |
| LR gain from LREM | | | | |

=== 2017 ===
| Candidate | Label | First round | | Second round | |
| Candidate | Label | Votes | % | Votes | % |
|---|---|---|---|---|---|
| Céleste Lett | LR | 9,123 | 28.72 | 13,676 | 48.49 |
| Nicole Gries-Trisse | REM | 7,775 | 24.47 | 14,529 | 51.51 |
| Pascal Jenft | FN | 5,478 | 17.24 | | |
| David Suck | UDI | 4,193 | 13.20 | | |
| Brigitte Blang | FI | 2,092 | 6.59 | | |
| Angèle Dufflo | PS | 823 | 2.59 | | |
| Élisabeth Parachini | ECO | 549 | 1.73 | | |
| Solenne Schaff | DLF | 457 | 1.44 | | |
| Chantal Uhring | REG | 264 | 0.83 | | |
| Bernadette Hilpert | PCF | 218 | 0.69 | | |
| Ramazan Dogan | DIV | 193 | 0.61 | | |
| Sébastien Ollier | EXG | 193 | 0.61 | | |
| Yvonne Wentzel | DIV | 145 | 0.46 | | |
| Jacqueline Berger | DIV | 142 | 0.45 | | |
| Daniella Bettenfeld | EXG | 124 | 0.39 | | |
| Votes | | 31,769 | 100.00 | 28,205 | 100.00 |
| Valid votes | | 31,769 | 97.62 | 28,205 | 92.44 |
| Blank votes | | 564 | 1.73 | 1,585 | 5.19 |
| Null votes | | 211 | 0.65 | 722 | 2.37 |
| Turnout | | 32,544 | 43.99 | 30,512 | 41.25 |
| Abstentions | | 41,438 | 56.01 | 43,460 | 58.75 |
| Registered voters | | 73,982 | | 73,972 | |
Source: Ministry of the Interior

=== 2012 ===
Legislative Election 2012: Moselle's 5th constituency
| Party | Candidate | Votes | % | ±% |
|---|---|---|---|---|
| UMP | Céleste Lett | 16,744 | 43.00 | |
| PS | Angèle Dufflo | 9,714 | 24.94 | |
| FN | Philippe Marcel Armand | 8,071 | 20.73 | |
| DVE | Michel Uhring | 1,663 | 4.27 | |
| FG | Alphonse Walter | 1,294 | 3.32 | |
| Others | N/A | 1,456 | | |
| Turnout | | 38,942 | 52.18 | |
2nd round result
| UMP | Céleste Lett | 21,721 | 60.24 | |
| PS | Angèle Dufflo | 14,334 | 39.76 | |
| Turnout | | 36,055 | 48.32 | |
| UMP hold | | | | |

== Sources ==
Official results of French elections from 2002: "Résultats électoraux officiels en France" (in French).
