= Nicole Gries-Trisse =

French politician

Nicole Griess-Trisse
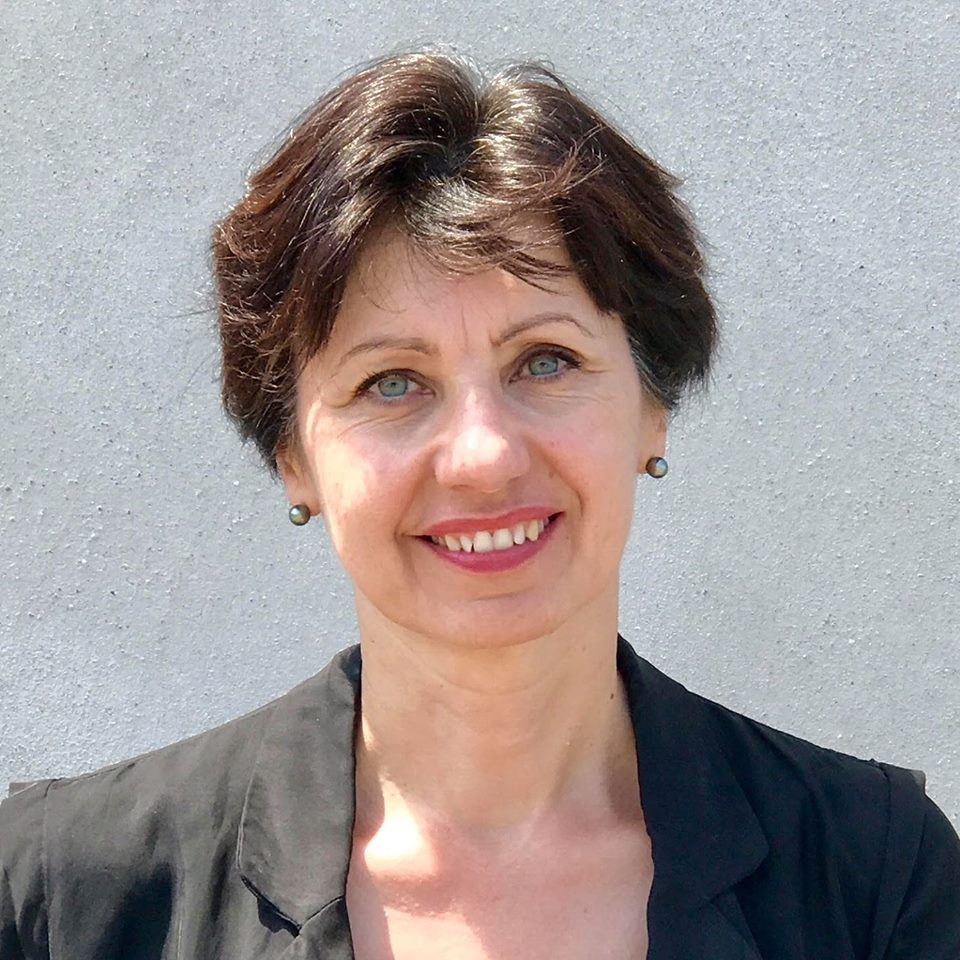

Member of the French National Assembly for Moselle's 5th constituency
- In office 21 June 2017 – June 2022
- Preceded by: Céleste Lett
- Succeeded by: Vincent Seitlinger

Personal details
- Born: 29 June 1963 (age 62) Sarreguemines, France
- Party: En Marche!

Nicole Gries-Trisse (born 29 June 1963) is a French politician of La République En Marche! (LREM) who served as a member of the French National Assembly from 2017 to 2022, representing the 5th constituency of the department of Moselle.

== Political career ==
In parliament, Gries-Trisse served on the Committee on Foreign Affairs.

In addition to her committee assignments, Gries-Trisse chaired the French delegation to the Parliamentary Assembly of the Council of Europe from 2017 to 2022. She also served on the Committee on Rules of Procedure, Immunities and Institutional Affairs and the Sub-Committee on Ethics. In 2019, she was the Assembly's rapporteur on the Council of Europe Development Bank (CEB).

In 2020, Trisse joined En commun (EC), a group within LREM led by Barbara Pompili.

Trisse lost her seat in the first round of the 2022 French legislative election.

== Political positions ==
In April 2018, Gries-Trisse joined other co-signatories around Sébastien Nadot in officially filing a request for a commission of inquiry into the legality of French weapons sales to the Saudi-led coalition fighting in Yemen, days before an official visit of Saudi Crown Prince Mohammed bin Salman to Paris.

In July 2019, Gries-Trisse voted in favor of the French ratification of the European Union’s Comprehensive Economic and Trade Agreement (CETA) with Canada.

== See also ==
- 2017 French legislative election
