= 2001 El Paso mayoral election =

- May 5, 2001 (primary); May 26, 2001 (general)
- Turnout: 12.29% (primary); 9.85 (runoff)
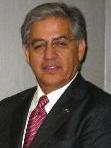

Candidate	Raymond Caballero	Larry Francis
Party	Nonpartisan	Nonpartisan
Popular vote	19,619	10,344
Percentage	65.48%	34.52%
Mayor before election
Carlos Ramirez
Elected mayor
Raymond Caballero

The 2001 El Paso mayoral election was held on May 26, 2001, to elect the mayor of El Paso, Texas. It saw the election of Raymond Caballero.

Caballero defeated former mayor Larry Francis.

== Results ==
=== Primary ===
Primary results
Party	Candidate	Votes	%
Nonpartisan	Raymond Caballero	18,081	50.37
Nonpartisan	Larry Francis	12,605	35.11
Nonpartisan	Presi Ortega	3,528	9.83
Nonpartisan	Belen B. Robles	1,477	4.11
Nonpartisan	Carl Starr	104	0.29
Nonpartisan	Leeland O. White	104	0.29
Total votes		35,899	

=== General election ===
General election results
Party	Candidate	Votes	%
Nonpartisan	Raymond Caballero	19,619	65.48
Nonpartisan	Larry Francis	10,344	34.52
Total votes		29,963	
