= Suzie Azar =

American politician

43rd Mayor of El Paso
- In office 1989–1991
- Preceded by: Jonathan W. Rogers
- Succeeded by: William S. Tilney

Suzanne Azar (née Schmeck, born 1946) is a politician, aviator and former mayor of El Paso, Texas. Azar was the first woman to serve as mayor in El Paso. Azar lives in Central El Paso. She is also a flight instructor and owner of a fixed-base operator and flight school; and is a member of the women pilots' organization, the Ninety-Nines. Azar has been inducted into the El Paso Women's Hall of Fame.

== Biography ==
Azar was born in Bay City, Michigan in 1946 and as a young person was a member of the Civil Air Patrol. She moved to El Paso in 1970 and attended the University of Texas at El Paso (UTEP).

Azar was sworn into office as mayor of El Paso in 1989. During her campaign, she was called a "cheerleader" by her opponent, and Azar turned the intended insult to "her advantage, campaigning with pom poms and calling herself an unabashed cheerleader for El Paso". She won the campaign for mayor with a 65% majority vote.

Preceded by Jonathan W. Rogers	Mayor of El Paso; 1989–1991	Succeeded by William S. Tilney
