= Tom Westfall =

American politician

Thomas D. Westfall (May 14, 1927 – March 7, 2005) was an American politician who served as the mayor of El Paso, Texas for one term from 1979 to 1981.

Westfall was born in Decatur, Illinois. Westfall joined the United States Marine Corps at the age of 17 and served with the 1st Marines in the Pacific and Tientsin, China during the final campaigns of World War II. After the war, under the G.I. Bill, Westfall attended Millikin University, where he obtained a BA degree, and the University of Illinois at Urbana–Champaign where he obtained a law degree in 1951. Westfall was then hired by the Federal Bureau of Investigation and worked as an agent for over 25 years in Dallas, Columbus, Ohio, Washington, D.C., Savannah, Georgia, and finally in El Paso, Texas, where he was the Assistant Special Agent in Charge. In this capacity, he supervised criminal investigations of offenses of federal laws until his retirement. He was an Ohio State Bar Association member.

In 1979, Westfall was elected mayor of El Paso, defeating the incumbent Ray Salazar in the election. Westfall ran into situations which put him in opposition to many of his political opponents, some of whom preferred a more subtle approach to problems. Westfall was defeated for reelection in 1981 by Jonathan Rogers.

In 1985 Westfall relocated to North Bend, Oregon where he died in March 2005 at the age of 77.

He was married for 53 years to Margie Peters, whom he met while in high school in Decatur.

Preceded by Ray Salazar	Mayor of El Paso, Texas; 1979—1981	Succeeded by Jonathan W. Rogers
