= Joe Wardy =

American politician (born 1953)

48th Mayor of El Paso
- In office 2003–2005
- Preceded by: Raymond Caballero
- Succeeded by: John Cook

Personal details
- Born: 1953 (age 71–72)
- Profession: Businessman politician
- Website: Government website (Archived)

Joseph D. Wardy (born 1953) is the former mayor of El Paso, Texas. He was elected mayor in 2003, when he unseated incumbent mayor Raymond Caballero. Wardy was defeated by John Cook in the 2005 mayoral election.

Wardy, a businessman in the trucking industry, was generally regarded as favorable to business interests, in contrast to his predecessor's more confrontational stand against "big developers" and industries. During his term, El Paso transitioned from a mayor-council form of government to one with a "weak mayor" and appointed city manager.

On Tuesday, May 9, 2006, the National Center for the Employment of the Disabled (NCED) (renamed Ready One Industries in March 2006), of which Wardy was President and CEO, was raided by over 65 agents with the Federal Bureau of Investigation (FBI), General Services Administration, US Army and Internal Revenue Service. The raid, which began at 8:00 am and lasted well into the evening, was part of an ongoing probe into contracts awarded. The company won contracts based on a promise that at least 75 percent of workers filling government orders would be severely disabled. Officers took over two truckloads of documents and several copied hard drives from office computers to aid in the investigation. It was soon thereafter concluded that Wardy was responsible for no wrongdoing.

Wardy was detained and questioned by police and the FBI after a screener at the El Paso International Airport detected a loaded handgun in his carry-on luggage on Wednesday, March 7, 2007. Wardy was the fifth individual attempting to carry a weapon aboard an aircraft since 2005. According to FBI spokeswoman Andrea Simmons, Simmons described the gun, which was confiscated by the FBI, as a .22-caliber Beretta. Wardy was released after being questioned. He was not arrested or charged, but the U.S. Attorney's Office requested that the investigation continue.

== See also ==
- Bob Jones (Texas businessman)
