= Bob Jones (Texas businessman) =

American businessman

Robert Edward Jones is a Texas businessman and convicted criminal. He was formerly CEO of the National Center for Employment of the Disabled (NCED), which was based in El Paso, Texas.

In late 2006, The Oregonian newspaper published articles alleging that Jones embezzled millions of dollars from NCED and, by extension, from the Javits-Wagner-O'Day (JWOD) Program, a United States federal program that helps blind and other severely disabled people. Under the management of the Jones Family Trust (JFT), NCED allegedly broke federal rules by claiming employees as disabled whose sole "disability" ("disadvantage") was reportedly being Spanish language speakers who were unable to speak English. NCED, a maker of chemical protective suits for soldiers, has since been reorganized as ReadyOne.

On October 14, 2008, Bob Jones was arrested by the Federal Bureau of Investigation after having been charged under a 37-count indictment in connection with the alleged contract fraud of millions of dollars in government programs. The arrest was part of a federal investigation into alleged public corruption among elected officials and prominent businesspeople in El Paso, Texas. Also arrested were Ernesto Lopez and Patrick James Woods.

The office of the United States attorney in San Antonio stated that Robert Jones was accused of lying about the number of disabled employees, and of embezzling or stealing from the company. Prosecutors reportedly demanded that Jones forfeit $58.9 million. Jones originally pleaded not guilty. On July 2, 2009, Jones pleaded guilty to various charges in the case. On February 17, 2011, a judge sentenced Jones to 10 years in prison and $65 million in restitution for corruption and embezzlement.

Jones is incarcerated at the Federal Correctional Institution, La Tuna, at Anthony, Texas, near El Paso. He was later transferred to a Residential Reentry Management facility in Dallas, Texas and was released on Aug 23, 2019.

== See also ==
- Skilcraft
- Joe Wardy
- El Paso Flooring Contractor Scandal

== Sources ==
- El Paso Inc. -- "Nasty allegations fly in lawsuit against Bob Jones"
- America's Investigative Reports (AIR) -- 2006-11-17 PBS broadcast on activities in connection with the Javits-Wagner-O'Day (JWOD) Program
- "Corrupt El Paso charity boss exposed by The Oregonian gets 10 years in federal prison", The Oregonian, February 18, 2011.
