= Victor H. Espinoza =

American Medal of Honor recipient (1929–1986)

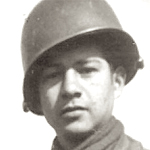
- Born: July 15, 1929; El Paso, Texas, U.S.
- Died: April 17, 1986 (aged 56); El Paso, Texas, U.S.
- Burial place: Fort Bliss National Cemetery
- Military career
- Allegiance: United States
- Branch: United States Army
- Rank: Sergeant
- Units: 1st Battalion, 23rd Infantry Regiment, 2nd Infantry Division
- Conflicts: Korean War
- Awards: Medal of Honor

Victor Hugo Espinoza (July 15, 1929 – April 17, 1986) was a United States Army veteran of the Korean War and a recipient of the Medal of Honor for his actions during the Battle of Old Baldy.

== Biography ==
Espinoza was born in El Paso, Texas, on July 15, 1929. Orphaned at an early age, he remained in foster care until joining the military.

Espinoza's actions in the U.S. Army during the Korean War in 1952 caused him to be posthumously awarded with the Medal of Honor in 2014.

After leaving the Army, Espinoza resided in El Paso until his death on April 17, 1986. Espinoza is buried at Fort Bliss National Cemetery. He was of Mexican American descent.

== Medal of Honor ==
Espinoza was recognized for his actions on Aug. 1, 1952, at Chorwon, Korea.

While spearheading an attack to secure Old Baldy, Espinoza's unit was pinned down by withering fire from fortified enemy positions. In daring succession, Espinoza single-handedly silenced a machine-gun and its crew, discovered and destroyed a covert enemy tunnel, and wiped out two bunkers. His actions inspired his unit and enabled them to secure the strong-point against great odds.

Espinoza's son Tyronne accepted the Medal of Honor on his father's behalf during a White House ceremony on March 18, 2014

The award came through the Defense Authorization Act which called for a review of Jewish American and Hispanic American veterans from World War II, the Korean War and the Vietnam War to ensure that no prejudice was shown to those deserving the Medal of Honor.

=== Medal of Honor Citation ===

The President of the United States of America, authorized by Act of Congress, July 9, 1918 (amended by act of July 25, 1963), takes pride in presenting the Medal of Honor (posthumously) to:

VICTOR H. ESPINOZA
United States Army

For conspicuous gallantry and intrepidity at the risk of his life above and beyond the call of duty:

Corporal Victor H. Espinoza distinguished himself by acts of gallantry and intrepidity above and beyond the call of duty while serving as an Acting Rifleman in Company A, 23d Infantry Regiment, 2d Infantry Division during combat operations against an armed enemy in Chorwon, Korea on August 1, 1952. On that day, Corporal Espinoza and his unit were responsible for securing and holding a vital enemy hill. As the friendly unit neared its objective, it was subjected to a devastating volume of enemy fire, slowing its progress. Corporal Espinoza, unhesitatingly and being fully aware of the hazards involved, left his place of comparative safety and made a deliberate one man assault on the enemy with his rifle and grenades, destroying a machinegun and killing its crew. Corporal Espinoza continued across the fire-swept terrain to an exposed vantage point where he attacked an enemy mortar position and two bunkers with grenades and rifle fire, knocking out the enemy mortar position and destroying both bunkers and killing their occupants. Upon reaching the crest, and after running out of rifle ammunition, he called for more grenades. A comrade who was behind him threw some Chinese grenades to him. Immediately upon catching them, he pulled the pins and hurled them into the occupied trenches, killing and wounding more of the enemy with their own weapons. Continuing on through a tunnel, Corporal Espinoza made a daring charge, inflicting at least seven more casualties upon the enemy who were fast retreating into the tunnel. Corporal Espinoza was quickly in pursuit, but the hostile fire from the opening prevented him from overtaking the retreating enemy. As a result, Corporal Espinoza destroyed the tunnel with TNT, called for more grenades from his company, and hurled them at the enemy troops until they were out of reach. Corporal Espinoza's incredible display of valor secured the vital strong point and took a heavy toll on the enemy, resulting in at least fourteen dead and eleven wounded. Corporal Espinoza's extraordinary heroism and selflessness above and beyond the call of duty are in keeping with the highest traditions of military service and reflect great credit upon himself, his unit and the United States Army.

== Other honors and awards ==
Besides the Medal of Honor, Espinoza received:

Badge	Combat Infantryman Badge		
1st row	Medal of Honor		
2nd row	Medal of Honor		National Defense Service Medal
3rd row	Korean Service Medal with 2 Campaign stars	United Nations Service Medal Korea	Korean War Service Medal
Unit awards	Presidential Unit Citation		

== See also ==
- List of Korean War Medal of Honor recipients
