= Henry Wills (Medal of Honor) =

- Born: c. 1842; Gracon, Virginia
- Military career
- Allegiance: United States of America
- Branch: United States Army
- Rank: Private
- Unit: 8th Cavalry Regiment
- Conflicts: Indian Wars
- Awards: Medal of Honor

Henry Wills (born c. 1842, date of death unknown) was a United States Army soldier and a recipient of the United States military's highest decoration—the Medal of Honor—for his actions in the Indian Wars of the western United States.

== Formative years ==
Born in Gracon, Virginia in about 1842, Wills resided in St. Louis, Missouri at the time of his enlistment in the United States Army.

== American Civil War ==
Wills served as a private in Company C of the 8th Cavalry Regiment. He was cited for providing "[s]ervices against hostile Indians" near Fort Selden, New Mexico, from July 8 to July 11, 1873, and was awarded the Medal of Honor two years later, on August 12, 1875. He participated in the same engagement as fellow Medal of Honor recipient Frank Bratling.

== Medal of Honor citation ==
Rank and organization: Private, Company C, 8th U.S. Cavalry. Place and date: Near Fort Selden, N. Mex., 8-July 11, 1873. Entered service at. Pennsylvania. Birth: Gracon, Pa. Date of issue: August 12, 1875.

Citation:

Services against hostile Indians.

== See also ==
- List of Medal of Honor recipients for the Indian Wars
