= Arthur H. Butler =

American Marine Corps Major General

Arthur Howard Butler
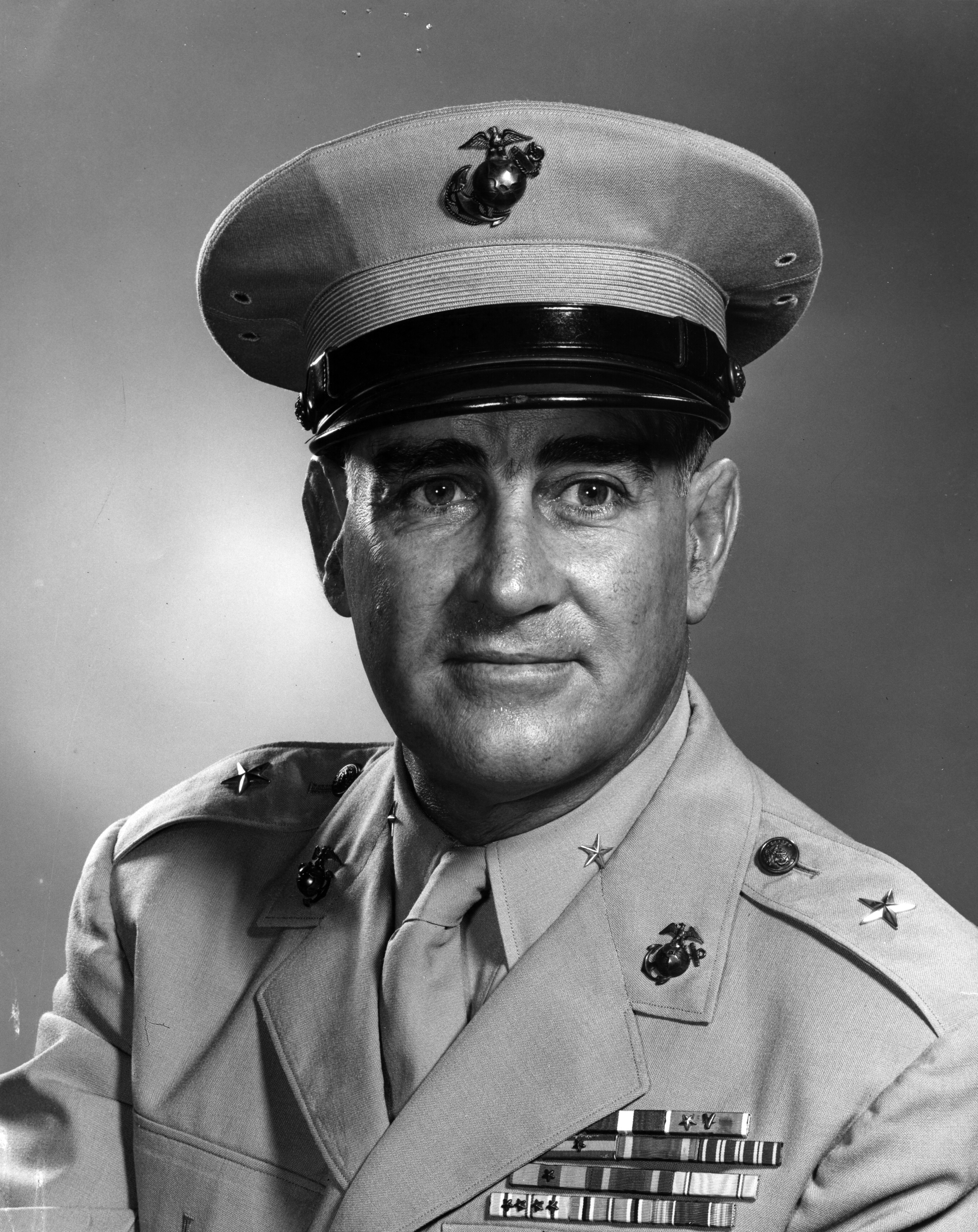
- BG Arthur H. Butler, USMC
- Born: July 17, 1903; Alexandria, Louisiana, US
- Died: April 24, 1972 (aged 68); El Paso, Texas, US
- Burial place: Fort Bliss National Cemetery
- Military career
- Allegiance: United States
- Branch: United States Marine Corps
- Service years: 1926–1956
- Rank: Major general
- Nickname: "Tex"
- Service number: 0-4069
- Commands: 21st Marine Regiment
- Conflicts: Nicaraguan Campaign; Haitian Campaign; Yangtze Patrol; World War II: Bougainville Campaign; Recapture of Guam; Battle of Iwo Jima
- Awards: Navy Cross; Legion of Merit (2)

Arthur Howard Butler (July 17, 1903 – April 24, 1972) was a highly decorated officer in the United States Marine Corps with the rank of major general. A veteran of World War II, he distinguished himself as commanding officer, 21st Marine Regiment during the Recapture of Guam in July 1944 and was decorated with the Navy Cross, one of the United States military's second-highest decorations awarded for valor in combat.

== Early career ==
Arthur H. Butler was born on July 17, 1903, in Alexandria, Louisiana, as the son of Arthur and Cora Butler. His father was a Doctor of Medicine and veteran of World War I, where he served with Army Medical Corps as captain. Following the high school, young Arthur received appointment to the United States Naval Academy at Annapolis, Maryland, and graduated four years later with bachelor's degree. During his time at the academy, Butler was active in football and wrestling.

He was commissioned second lieutenant in the Marine Corps upon graduation on June 3, 1926, and ordered to the Marine barracks at Brooklyn Navy Yard and subsequently to the Basic School at Philadelphia Navy Yard for basic officer training. He completed the training in May 1927 and joined 5th Marine Regiment at Quantico, Virginia.

Butler subsequently sailed for expeditionary duty to Nicaragua during the same month and participated in the jungle patrols against bandits under Augusto César Sandino until his regiment was ordered to Haiti in August 1927. He returned to the United States in May 1928 and served consecutively at Quantico, Pensacola and Norfolk Navy Yard, before sailed back to Haiti for service with 1st Marine Brigade.

He was ordered back to the United States in December 1929 and attached to the Marine Barracks Quantico, Virginia, where he remained until July 1930. Butler was then ordered to the Marine barracks at Philadelphia Navy Yard and subsequently to Marine Corps Base San Diego in February 1931. He was subsequently attached to the 4th Marine Regiment under Colonel Emile P. Moses and sailed for China in April of that year.

Butler participated in the guard duty at Shanghai International Settlement for four years and returned to the United States in November 1934. He then again served at San Diego, before he was transferred to Quantico in March 1935. In October of that year, he was ordered to the Junior Course at Marine Corps Schools, Quantico, which he completed in May 1936. Butler then served as captain and commander of the Marine detachment at Texas Centennial Exposition in Dallas until December of that year.

He subsequently took part in the Fleet Maneuvers off the coast of California and embarked for Panama Canal Zone in April 1937. Butler was stationed at Balboa, where he helped establish a Marine detachment at the Naval Ammunition Depot. He subsequently served as commanding officer of the detachment until June 1939.

Upon return to the United States, Butler entered the instruction at Army Command and General Staff College at Fort Leavenworth, Kansas, and graduated in February 1940. He was then sent to the staff of the Marine Corps Schools, Quantico and served as an instructor under Brigadier General Samuel M. Harrington until September 1942.

== World War II ==
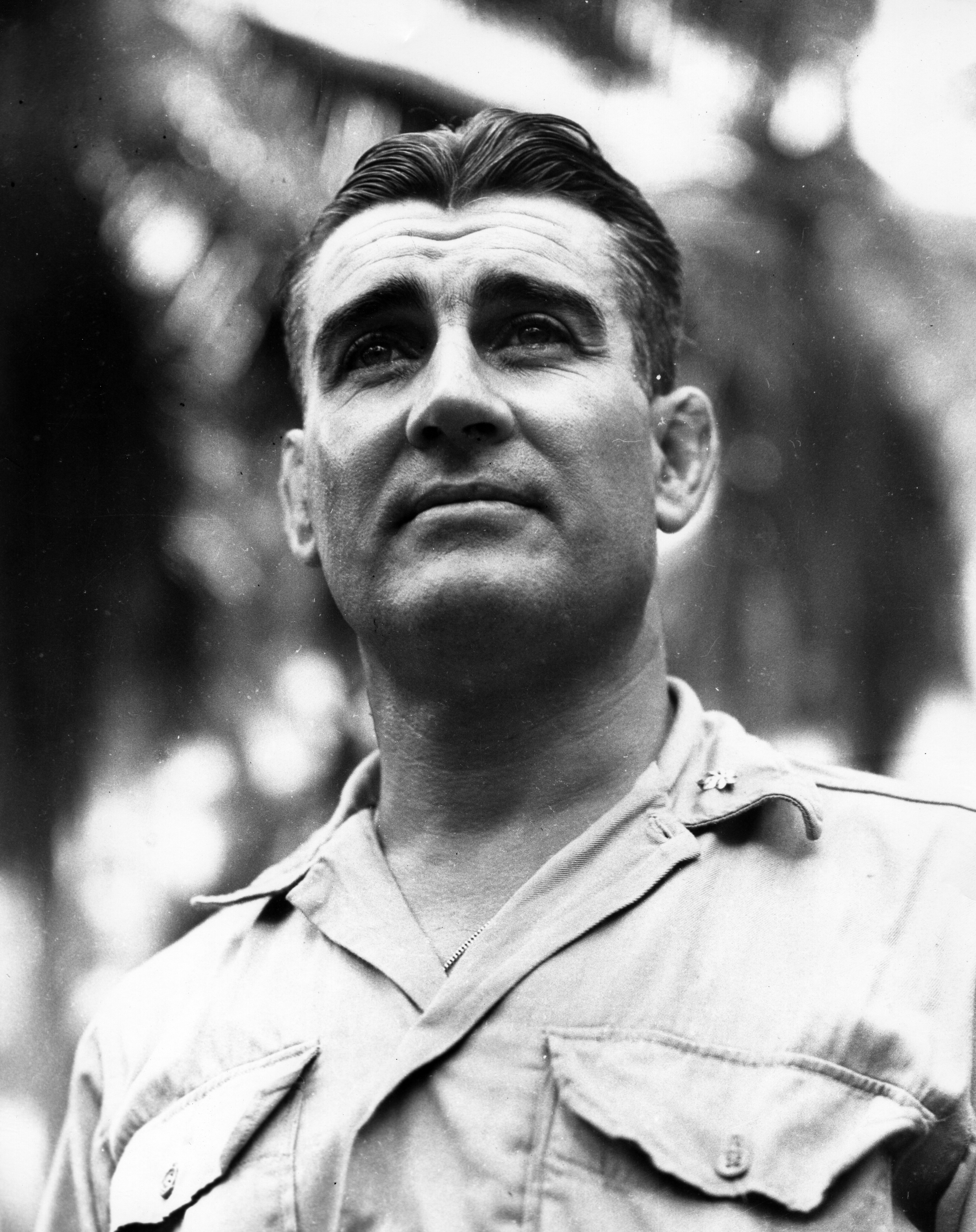
Butler as lieutenant colonel somewhere in Pacific area.

With the increasing number of newly activated marine units, Butler was ordered to Camp Lejeune, North Carolina and joined the staff of 3rd Marine Division under Major General Charles D. Barrett as Infantry Operations officer. He moved with the division to Camp Elliott, California and participated in the intensive training until February 1943, when the 3rd Division was ordered to the Pacific area.

Butler arrived to Auckland, New Zealand and after one month there, he was named executive officer, 21st Marine Regiment under Colonel Evans O. Ames. The 21st Marines spent several months in mid-1943 on Guadalcanal, where it conducted intensive jungle training and then sailed for Bougainville, Solomon Islands at the beginning of November 1943 as the part of 3rd Marine Division.

The 21st Marines finally went ashore on November 6 and spent next few weeks of light fighting with no major action against Japanese forces. During the second week in December of that year, Butler took part in the Battle of Hellzapoppin Ridge and Hill 600A, where the regiment's primary task was to reduce these positions and drive the remaining Japanese east of the Torokina River. The thick jungle and narrow trails added to the Marines' difficulties as they attempted ro dislodge the enemy. The battle lasted until December 24 and Butler and his regiment finally embarked for Guadalcanal on January 9, 1944. For his service on Bougainville, Butler was decorated with the Legion of Merit with Combat "V".

While at Guadalcanal, Butler assumed temporary command of 21st Marines on January 20 and commanded the regiment for almost next two weeks during the rest and refit activities. He was subsequently relieved by Colonel Robert Blake on February 1, 1944, and resumed his duties as regimental executive officer. Following his promotion to colonel in April of that year, Butler assumed command of 21st Marine Regiment and led it during the Recapture of Guam on July 21, 1944.

He went ashore with the initial assault troops in the face of intense hostile mortar fire and moved forward to the base of the first captured high ground where, after a personal reconnaissance of the terrain, he launched an attack and seized the precipitous cliffs overlooking the entire beach area. When fanatical Japanese made repeated night attacks, culminating in a well-organized Banzai charge on the newly won positions, on the night of July 25–26, he exercised personal leadership of his troops, coordinated support fire and directed the movement of units to strengthen the lines. In the advance until July 28, Butler remained directly in the rear of advancing units and, by coordinating his Battalions, pushed through difficult terrain and successfully seized all objectives assigned to his command.

The regiment under Butler's command participated in the combats on Guam until August 10, when island was declared secured and subsequently conducted jungle patrols during the search for disorganized remnants of the enemy. For his service on Guam, Butler was decorated with the Navy Cross, the United States military's second-highest decoration awarded for valor in combat.

Butler remained with the 21st Marines until November 30, 1944, when he was relieved by his Naval Academy classmate, Hartnoll J. Withers and attached to the staff, 3rd Marine Division under Major General Graves B. Erskine as Operations and Planning Officer. He participated in the planning of divisional operations for Battle of Iwo Jima and took part in that operation in February–March 1945. Butler also received his second Legion of Merit for his part in Iwo Jima Campaign.

== Later career ==
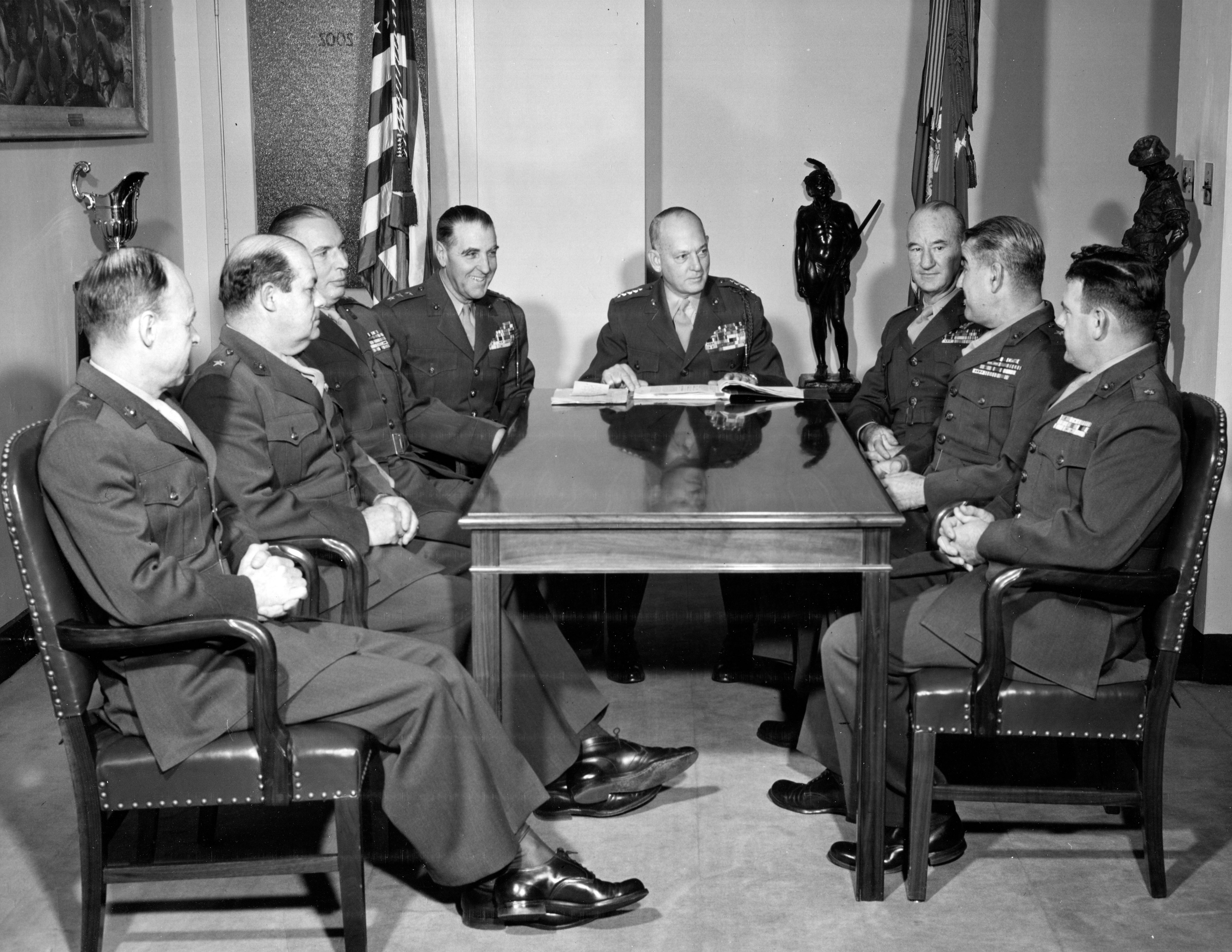
General Butler (second from right) as Assistant Chief of Staff for Logistics during meeting with Commandant, Lemuel C. Shepherd Jr.

Butler has been ordered back to the United States in May 1945 and joined the staff of Marine Corps Schools, Quantico under Brigadier General Oliver P. Smith. He served consecutively as coordinator of instruction, commander of the Platoon Commanders School, chief instructor of the Marine Corps Schools, intelligence officer and senior member of the Marine Corps Gazette editorial board, before he was transferred to Camp Pendleton, California, in June 1947.

He subsequently served there as chief of staff, 1st Marine Division under Major General Graves B. Erskine until June 1949, when he was ordered to the National War College in Washington, D.C., for instruction. Butler completed the course in June 1950 and served briefly with the General Board at the Navy Department, before he was sent back to Quantico in August of that year.

Butler then served as senior resident member of the Marine Corps Board until February 1952, when he was sent to the Headquarters Marine Corps for duty as assistant chief of staff for logistics. While in this capacity, he was promoted to brigadier general in May of that year and was responsible for the planning of budget for logistics for all marine forces and its advocating before the congressional committee on appropriations.

In July 1954, Butler was ordered to Paris, France, and joined the headquarters, United States European Command under General Alfred Gruenther. He served in this capacity until the beginning of June 1956, when he was ordered back home for retirement.

== Death ==
Butler retired from the Marine Corps on June 30, 1956, after 30 years of active service, and settled in El Paso, Texas, where he died on April 24, 1972.

== Decorations ==
Here is the ribbon bar of Major General Arthur H. Butler:

1st row	Navy Cross	Legion of Merit with Combat "V" and one 5/16" Gold Star	Navy Presidential Unit Citation with one star
2nd row	Navy Unit Commendation	Second Nicaraguan Campaign Medal	Marine Corps Expeditionary Medal with one star
3rd row	Yangtze Service Medal	American Defense Service Medal	American Campaign Medal
4th row	Asiatic-Pacific Campaign Medal with four 3/16 inch service star	World War II Victory Medal	National Defense Service Medal

=== Navy Cross citation ===
Citation:

The President of the United States of America takes pleasure in presenting the Navy Cross to Colonel Arthur H. Butler (MCSN: 0-4069), United States Marine Corps, for extraordinary heroism as Commanding Officer of the Twenty-First Marines, THIRD Marine Division, in action against enemy Japanese forces on Guam, Marianas Islands, from 21 July to 10 August 1944. Landing with the initial assault troops in the face of intense hostile mortar fire, Colonel Butler moved forward to the base of the first captured high ground where, after a personal reconnaissance of the terrain, he launched an attack and seized the precipitous cliffs overlooking the entire beach area. When fanatical Japanese made repeated night attacks, culminating in a well-organized "Banzai" attack on the newly won positions, on the night of 25–26 July, he exercised personal leadership of his troops, coordinated support fire and directed the movement of units to strengthen the lines. In the advance until 28 July, Colonel Butler remained directly in the rear of advancing units and, by coordinating his Battalions, pushed through difficult terrain and successfully seized all objectives assigned to his command. By his outstanding professional skill, aggressive leadership and expert use of modern military tactics in the face of intense and continuous hostile gunfire, Colonel Butler was instrumental in effecting the recapture of Guam by our forces, thereby upholding the highest traditions of the United States Naval Service.
