= 21st Marine Regiment (United States) =

- Active: 1942 —45
- Country: United States
- Branch: United States Marine Corps
- Type: Infantry regiment
- Engagements: World War II; Battle of Bougainville; Battle of Guam; Battle of Iwo Jima

Commanders
- Notable commanders: Robert Blake; Arthur H. Butler

The 21st Marine Regiment (21st Marines) was an infantry regiment of the United States Marine Corps. Commissioned for service during World War II, the regiment fought in the battles of Bougainville, Guam and Iwo Jima. It fell under the command of the 3rd Marine Division and was decommissioned at the end of the war on December 20, 1945.

== Subordinate units ==
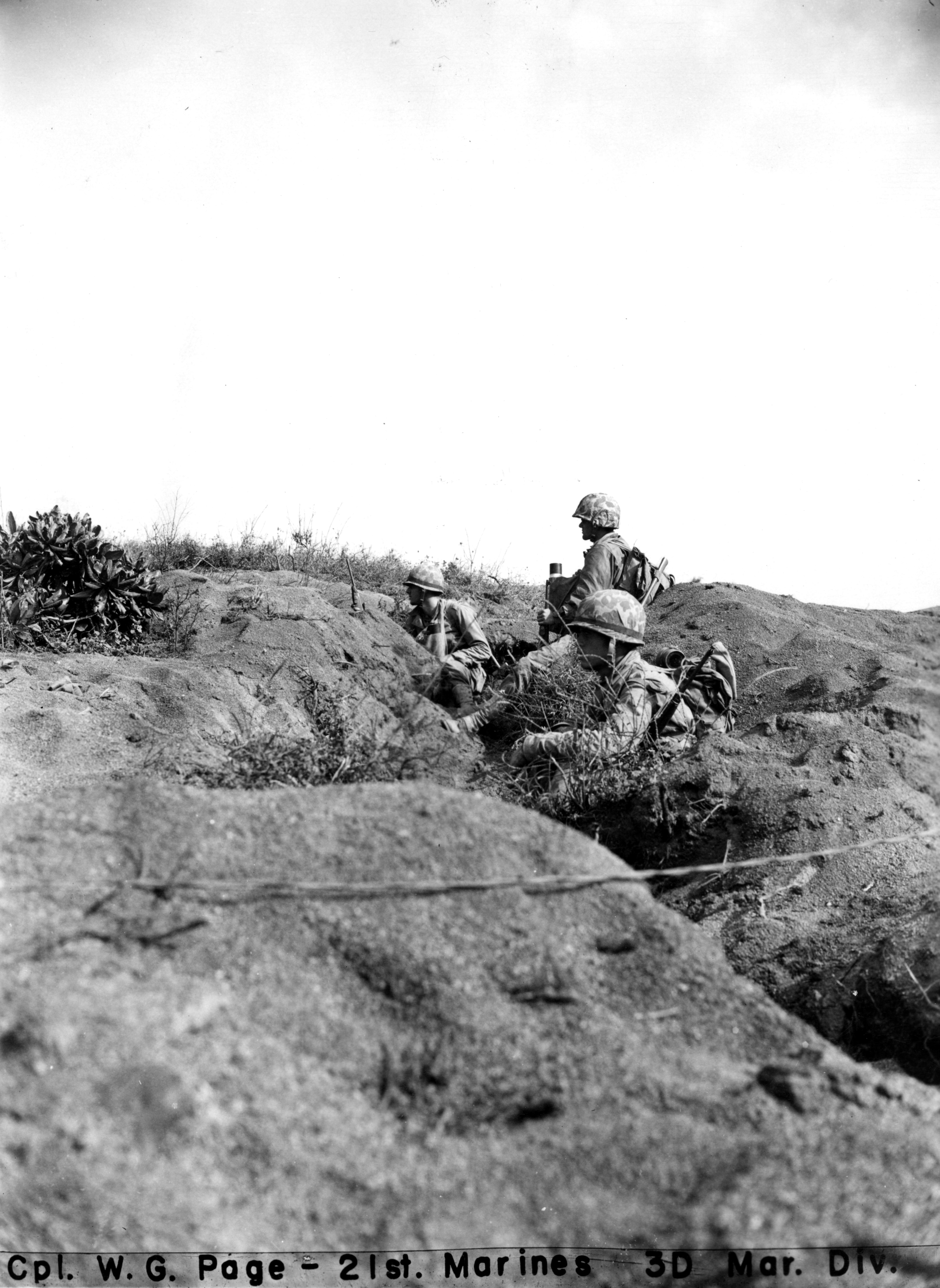
3rd Battalion, 21st Marines on Iwo Jima. 24 February, 1945

The regiment was composed of three infantry battalions and one headquarters company:

Battalions
Headquarters Company 21st Marines
1st Battalion, 21st Marines (1/21)
2nd Battalion, 21st Marines (2/21)
3rd Battalion, 21st Marines (3/21)

== History ==
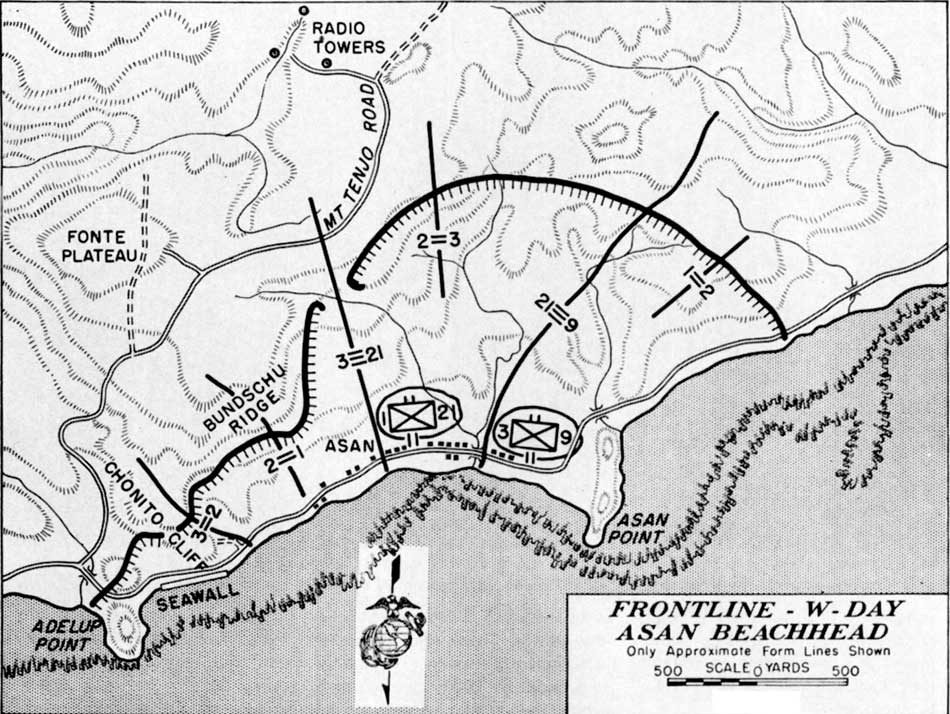
Fig. 1 Sketch of 21st Marines position after the first day of fighting on Guam.

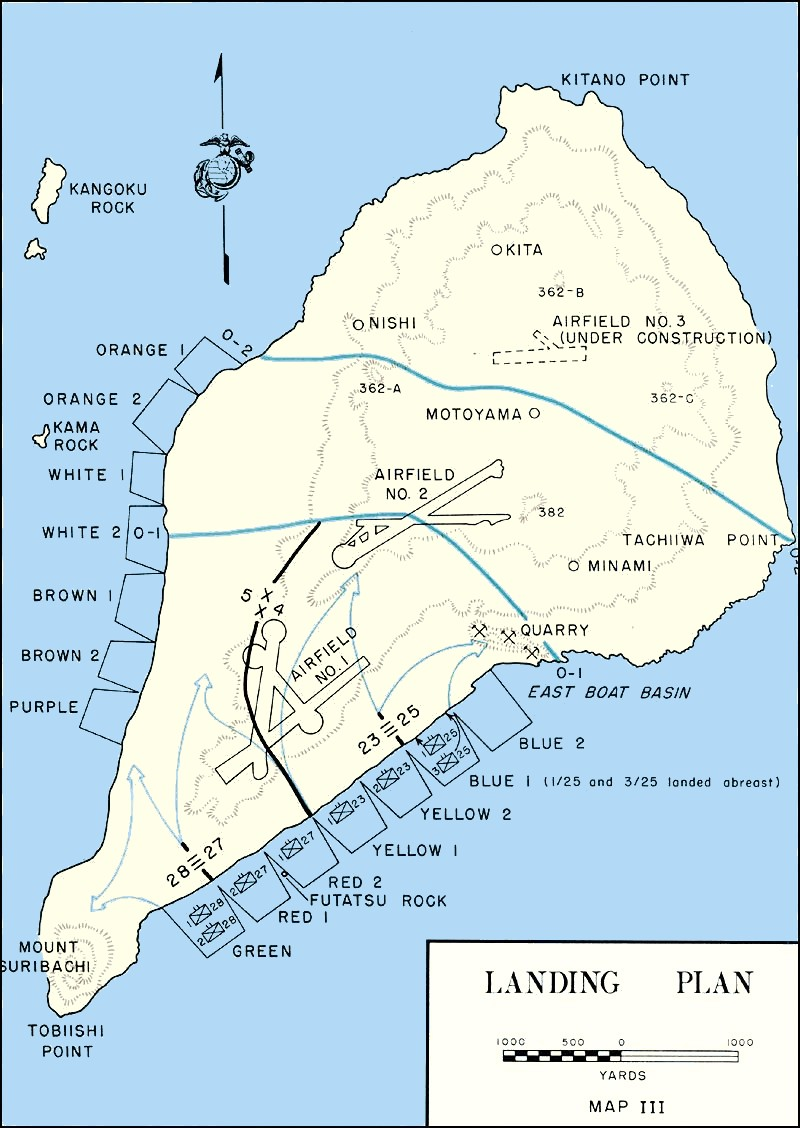
Fig. 2 Yellow beach 1 and 2 would have been where the 21st deployed from.

The 21st Marine Regiment was activated on July 14, 1942, at Camp Elliot, San Diego, California, but was actually organized at New River, North Carolina. Many of the first members of the regiment came from the 6th Marine Regiment. They were assigned to the 3rd Marine Division, however from January to June 1943 they were an independent regiment. During the war, the regiment took part in the Battle of Bougainville, Battle of Guam (Fig. 1) and the Battle of Iwo Jima. Following the Japanese surrender, 21st Marines moved to Guam where they were inactivated on December 20, 1945.

=== Iwo Jima ===
On Iwo the 21st RCT relieved the decimated 23rd on D-plus3 That placed the 21st in the 4th Marines ZofA assigned to yellow beach 2.(Fig. 2) The front lines were in the vicinities of Motoyama Airfields #1 and #2. On D-plus6 the Regiment reverted to the 3rd Marine Divisions control and was passed through by the 9th Marines.

== Unit awards ==
- Navy Unit Commendation, 21st Marine Regiment(and all units attached to or serving with)

== Notable former members ==
- Lowell E. English - Major General
- Hershel W. Williams - Medal of Honor recipient

== See also ==
- List of United States Marine Corps regiments
- Organization of the United States Marine Corps
- 21st Marines Action Report, Iwo Jima
