= Clarence A. Boonstra =

American diplomat

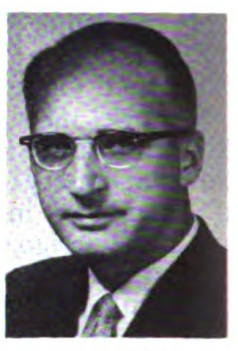

US Ambassador to Costa Rica
- In office January 26, 1967 – August 11, 1969
- President: Lyndon B. Johnson
- Preceded by: Raymond Telles
- Succeeded by: Walter C. Ploeser

Clarence A. Boonstra (January 5, 1914 – March 20, 2006) was the US Ambassador to Costa Rica from 1967 to 1969. His tours of duty also covered Brazil, Mexico and Philippines.

He was born in Grand Rapids, Michigan. Boonstra graduated with his bachelor's degree from Michigan State University. He received master's degree from Louisiana State University in economics in 1937 and in 1942 he earned a doctorate in agriculture economics. After entering the Foreign Service in 1946, he served as deputy chief of mission and chargé d'affaires in Mexico City. He served as political adviser to U.S. military forces with the Southern Command in Panama and also as director for South American affairs in the State Department.

During the rule of Juan Perón, he served in Argentina and in Cuba as guerrilla fighters under Fidel Castro that battled to overthrow the Batista government.

From 1967 to 1969, he served as ambassador to Costa Rica. He retired from the Foreign Service in 1974.

He died of pneumonia on March 20, 2006 at age 92 in Gainesville, Florida.

Diplomatic posts
Preceded by Raymond Telles	United States Ambassador to Costa Rica; 1967–1969	Succeeded by Walter C. Ploeser
