= Vincent Seitlinger =

French politician (born 1987)

Member of the National Assembly for Moselle's 5th constituency
- Incumbent
- Assumed office 22 June 2022
- Preceded by: Nicole Gries-Trisse

Personal details
- Born: 18 January 1987 (age 39) Sarreguemines, Moselle, France
- Party: Republican
- Parent: Jean Seitlinger (father)
- Education: Sciences Po

Vincent Seitlinger (French pronunciation: [vɛ̃sɑ̃ sɛtlɛ̃ʒe]; born 18 January 1987) is a French politician. He has represented Moselle's 5th constituency in the National Assembly since 2022.

His father Jean Seitlinger was MP for the same constituency from 1973 to 1997
