= Frank Bratling =

US Army Medal of Honor recipient (fl. 1870s)

- Born: c. 1845; Bavaria
- Died: July 13, 1873 (aged 27–28); Fort Seldon, New Mexico Territory, U.S.
- Burial place: Fort Leavenworth National Cemetery
- Military career
- Allegiance: United States of America
- Branch: United States Army
- Rank: Corporal
- Units: Company C, 8th Cavalry Regiment
- Conflicts: Indian Wars
- Awards: – Medal of Honor

Frank Bratling was a United States Army Corporal during the Indian Wars who posthumously received the Medal of Honor for service from June 8–11, 1873.

== Military Service ==
After intensely pursuing a group of Apache through 350 miles of rugged terrain for several days, Corporal Bratling and his unit, led by Captain George W. Chilson, eventually encountered the Apache group. During the battle, Bratling moved into the open for a better angle, but was shot through the chest and killed. Corporal Frank Bratling, Sergeant James L. Morris, Sergeant Leonidas S. Lytle, Blacksmith John Sherin and Private Henry Wills were each awarded the Medal of Honor for their conduct during the engagement. Bratling was initially buried at Fort McRae, but in the 1880s, the fort's cemetery was relocated to Fort Leavenworth.

== Medal of Honor citation ==
Citation:

Services against hostile Indians.
