= Jean Seitlinger =

French politician

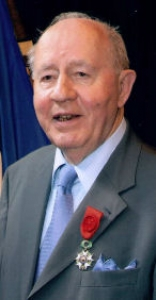
- Born: 16 November 1924; Saint-Louis-lès-Bitche, France
- Died: 1 September 2018 (aged 93)
- Children: Vincent Seitlinger

Jean Seitlinger (French pronunciation: [ʒɑ̃ sɛtlɛ̃ʒe]; 16 November 1924 – 1 September 2018) was a French politician who was a member of the National Assembly of France. He represented the Moselle's 5th constituency from 1958 to 1997, with interruptions. From 1979 - 1984 he was a member of the European Parliament.

The Conseil Général of Moselle renamed the Collège de Rohrbach in Rohrbach-lès-Bitche to Collège Jean Seitlinger in his honor in 2013.

He published his autobiography in 2006 titled Un Lorrain au coeur de l'Europe.
