= John Cook (Texas politician) =

Mayor of El Paso, Texas (born 1946)

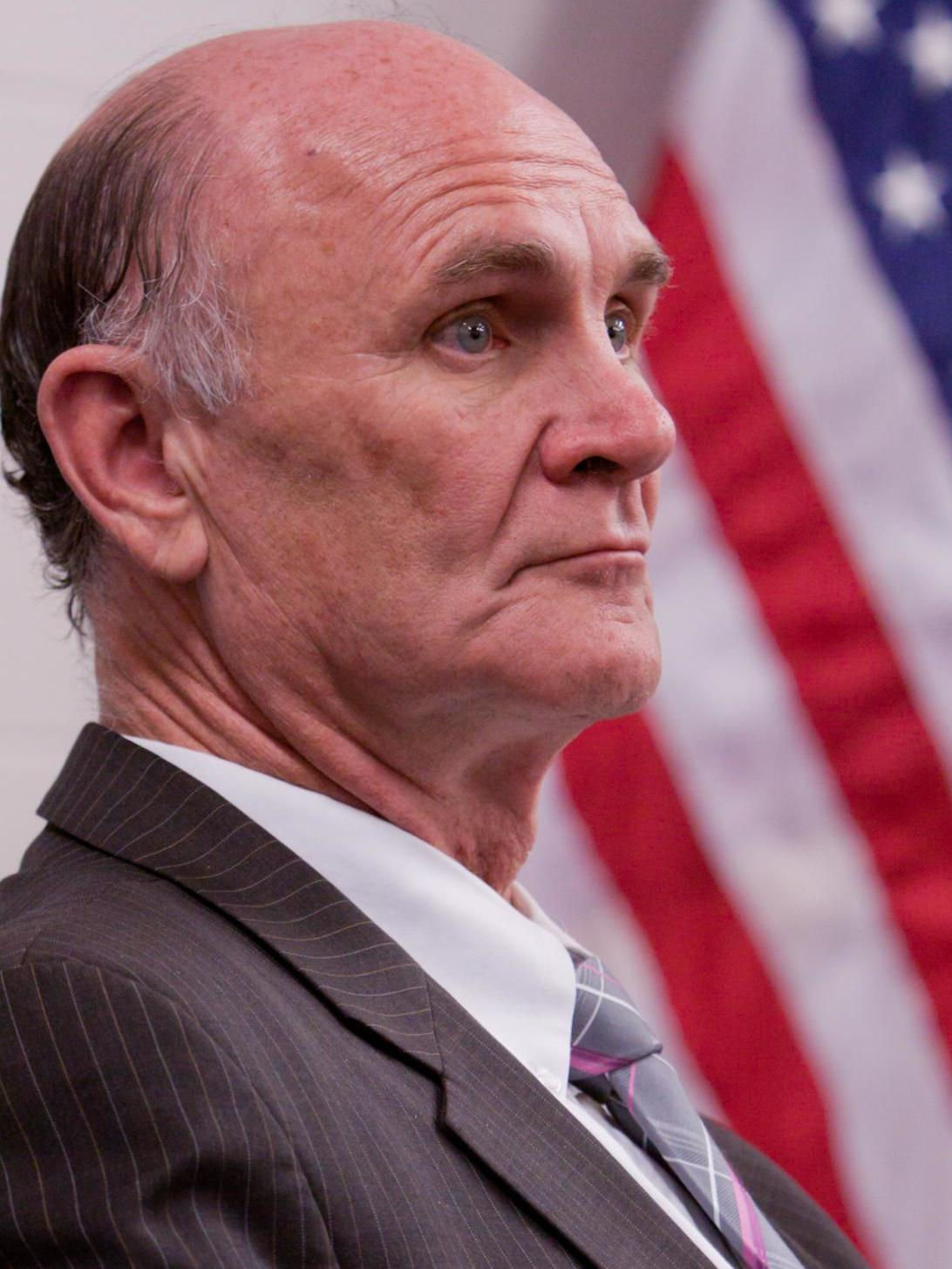

49th Mayor of El Paso
- In office June 13, 2005 – June 24, 2013
- Preceded by: Joe Wardy
- Succeeded by: Oscar Leeser

Personal details
- Born: February 27, 1946 (age 80) Brooklyn, New York, U.S.
- Party: Democratic
- Education: University of Texas at El Paso (BA)

John F. Cook (born February 27, 1946) is an American Democratic politician. He was mayor of El Paso, Texas for two terms from 2005 to 2013. Due to the City Charter's term limit clause, he was not eligible for a third term in 2013.

== Life and career ==
Cook graduated from New York City's Immaculata High School in 1964. He attended the University of Texas at El Paso and earned a degree in business in 1977. In 1970, Cook married his wife Tram Cook, with whom he has six children, nine grandchildren and two great-grandchildren.

Cook has lived for most of his life in Northeast El Paso, where his family has owned and operated several businesses. He served in the United States Army from 1967 to 1970, seeing service as a special agent in military intelligence. He served as the City Council Representative of the 4th District of El Paso from 1999 to June 2005 prior to being elected Mayor. He has been deeply involved in El Paso's community affairs, as a businessman, a teacher, coach, founder and member of the board of many civic and veterans' organizations.

Since becoming Mayor of El Paso, Cook has overseen the adoption of the Paso Del Norte Group's Downtown Redevelopment Plan.

The mayor and two city representatives were the subject of a failed recall petition in 2012. The petitions were accepted by the City Clerk, affirmed by Judge Alvarez, but overturned by the Eight Court of Appeals. The Court of Appeals declared the petitions illegal. Cook sued to recover attorney fees to stop the recall, which were estimated to be between $500,000 and $1 million.

Cook was one of 25 nominees in 2012 for the world-wide City Mayors Foundation prize, given to the "best mayor in the world".

The then Attorney General of Texas, Greg Abbott, wrote an opinion that cities, schools and counties in Texas, such as the city of El Paso broke the law in offering domestic benefits to same sex partners. Cook's tie-breaking vote to restore the domestic health benefits, after voters overturned it, was a chief cause of the failed recall attempt.

Cook was the unsuccessful Democratic nominee for Texas Land Commissioner in 2014. He was defeated by Republican George P. Bush.

== See also ==
- List of mayors of El Paso, Texas

Party political offices
Preceded by Hector Uribe	Democratic nominee for Land Commissioner of Texas; 2014	Succeeded by Miguel Suazo
