= William S. Tilney =

Mayor of El Paso, Texas, USA in the 1990s

Mayor of El Paso, Texas
- In office 1991-1993

Personal details
- Born: 1939 (age 85–86)

William Stephen "Bill" Tilney (born 1939) served as mayor of El Paso, Texas from 1991–93. He later taught United States history from 2000–03 at Jackie Robinson Academy in Long Beach, California. Prior to assuming his mayoral role, Tilney was the U.S. Consul General in Ciudad Juárez, Mexico.
