= Ralph Seitsinger =

American businessman and politician

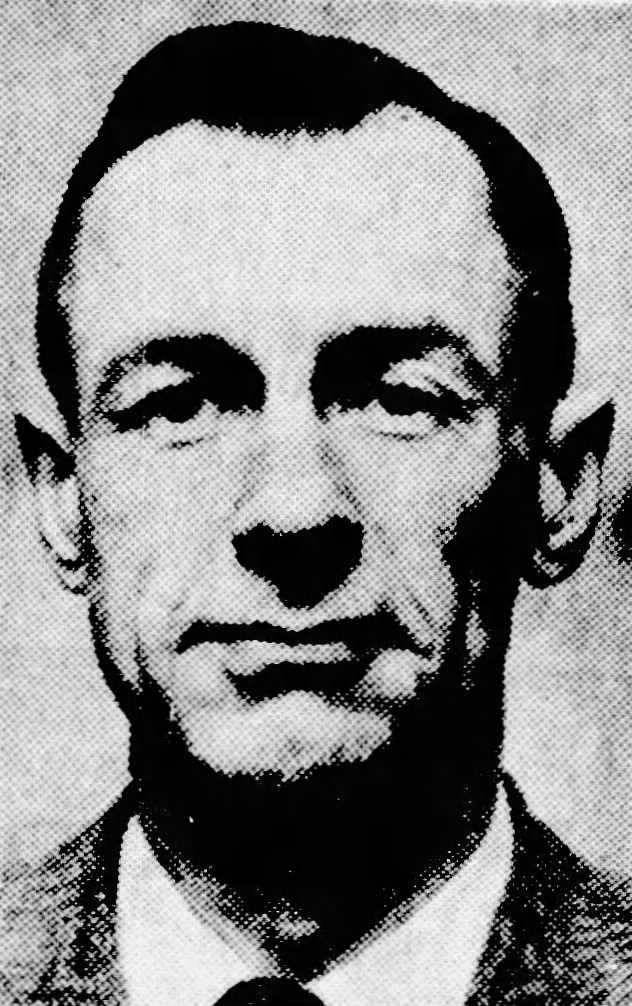
- Seitsinger c. 1961

33rd Mayor of El Paso
- In office 1961–1963
- Preceded by: Raymond Telles
- Succeeded by: Judson F. Williams

Personal details
- Born: January 13, 1916 Kinross, Iowa
- Died: March 30, 2016 (aged 100) El Paso, Texas
- Spouse: Marjorie Ann Hill
- Children: Five
- Education: University of New Mexico
- Profession: Businessman

Ralph E. Seitsinger (January 13, 1916 – March 30, 2016) was an American businessman, furniture merchant and politician. He served as the 36th Mayor of El Paso, Texas, from 1961 until 1963. Under Mayor Seitsinger, his administration oversaw the development and early planning for several major infrastructure projects, including the North-South Freeway through downtown El Paso, Texas State Highway Loop 375 (the Border Highway), and the Lower Valley sewer plant. Seitsinger, who identified more as a businessman than a politician, cited the growth of city parks and the development of El Paso International Airport as his greatest public accomplishments. A proponent of the maquiladoras, or twin plant manufacturing concept between the U.S. and Mexico, Sietsinger's administration laid the foundation for the Chamizal settlement, which ended the Chamizal border dispute between El Paso and Ciudad Juárez in 1970. Seitsinger was the oldest living former Mayor of El Paso at the time of his death in March 2016 at the age of 100.
