= Raymond Telles =

American politician and diplomat (1915–2013)

Raymond L. Telles Jr.
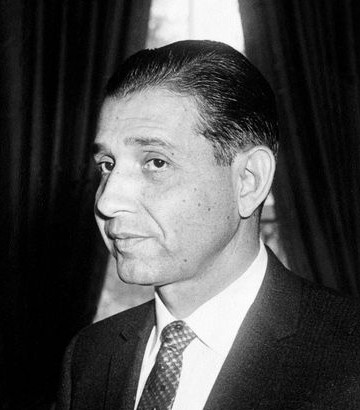
- Telles in 1961

United States Ambassador to Costa Rica
- In office May 22, 1961 – February 19, 1967
- President: John F. Kennedy
- Preceded by: Whiting Willauer
- Succeeded by: Clarence A. Boonstra

32nd Mayor of El Paso
- In office 1957–1961
- Preceded by: Tom E. Rogers
- Succeeded by: Ralph Seitsinger

Personal details
- Born: September 5, 1915 El Paso, Texas
- Died: March 8, 2013 (aged 97) Sherman Oaks, California
- Resting place: El Paso, Texas

Raymond L. Telles Jr. (September 5, 1915 – March 8, 2013) was an American politician and diplomat who served as United States Ambassador to Costa Rica from 1961 to 1967. Telles was also the 32nd Mayor of El Paso, Texas, becoming the first Mexican-American to hold either role, and the first American of Hispanic descent to hold the former.

== Early life ==
Telles was born and raised in the El Segundo Barrio neighborhood of El Paso, Texas.

== Career ==
Educated as an accountant, Telles worked at the United States Department of Justice for eight years. He was drafted into the Army in 1941. Telles then served in the U.S. Army Air Forces where he became Chief of the Lend-Lease Program for Central and South America. Telles left the service with the rank of major.

Telles received the Peruvian Flying Cross, the Order of the Southern Cross from Brazil, the Mexican Legion of Merit and Colombian wings in recognition of the Lend-Lease Program. Telles served as aide to several Latin American and Mexican presidents visiting the United States, and as military aide to Presidents Harry S. Truman and Dwight D. Eisenhower when visiting Mexico City.

Telles was elected county clerk for El Paso County, Texas in 1948.

In 1951, Telles was recalled for the Korean War. He served as Executive Officer of the 67th Tactical Reconnaissance Group, U.S. Air Force.

Telles was elected in 1957 mayor of El Paso and ran unopposed for a second term (1959–1961). He was appointed by President John F. Kennedy as Ambassador to Costa Rica. In 1967, President Lyndon B. Johnson appointed Telles chairman of the U.S.-Mexican Border Commission.

In 1971, President Richard Nixon appointed him chairman of the Equal Employment Opportunity Commission for the United States. Telles died on March 8, 2013, in Sherman Oaks, California, at the age of 97.

== Personal life ==
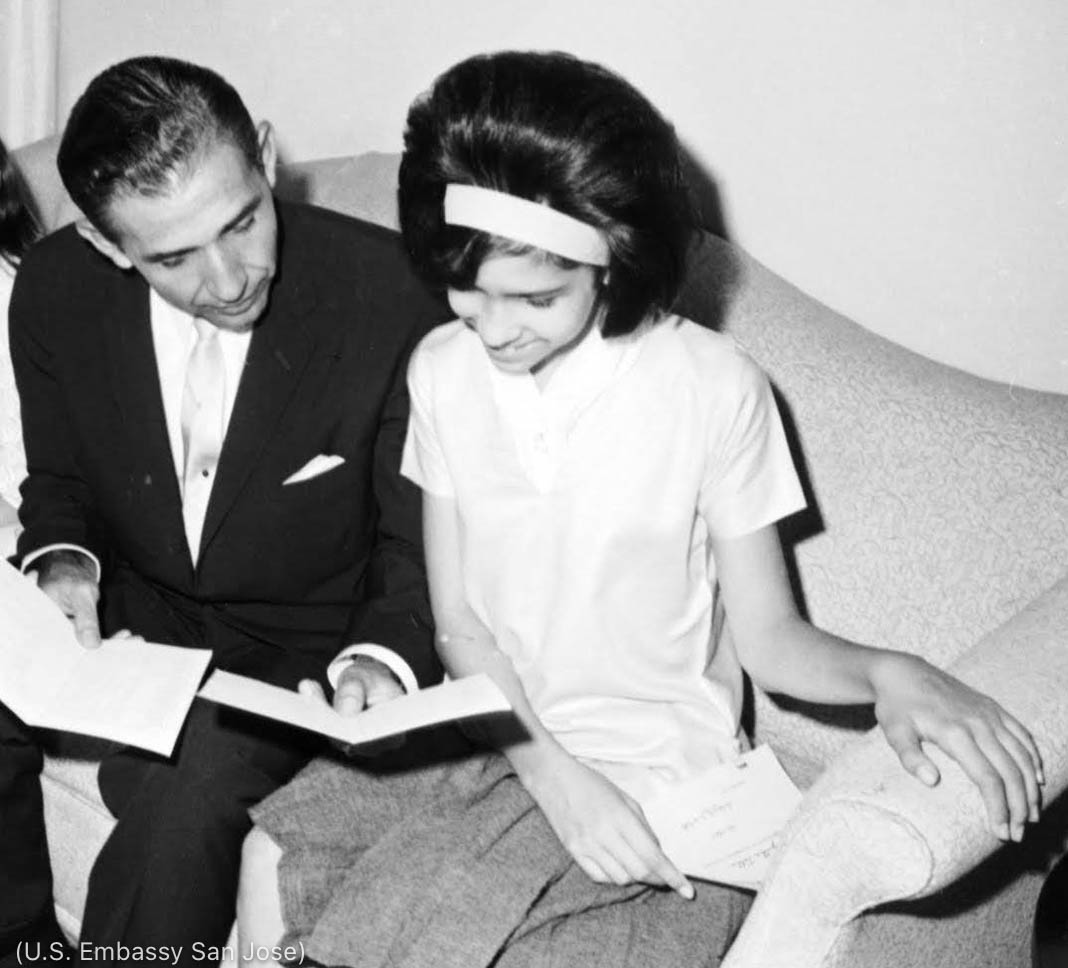
Costa Rica Ambassador Raymond Telles reads to his daughter, Cynthia, in December 1964.

Telles's daughter, Cynthia Telles, was a clinical professor of psychiatry at UCLA, before following in her father's footsteps as US ambassador to Costa Rica.

Civic offices
Preceded by Tom E. Rogers (1955-1957)	Mayor of El Paso; 1957–1961	Succeeded by Ralph Seitsinger (1961-1963)
Diplomatic posts
Preceded by Whiting Willauer	United States Ambassador to Costa Rica; May 22, 1961–February 19, 1967	Succeeded by Clarence A. Boonstra
