= Céleste Lett =

French politician

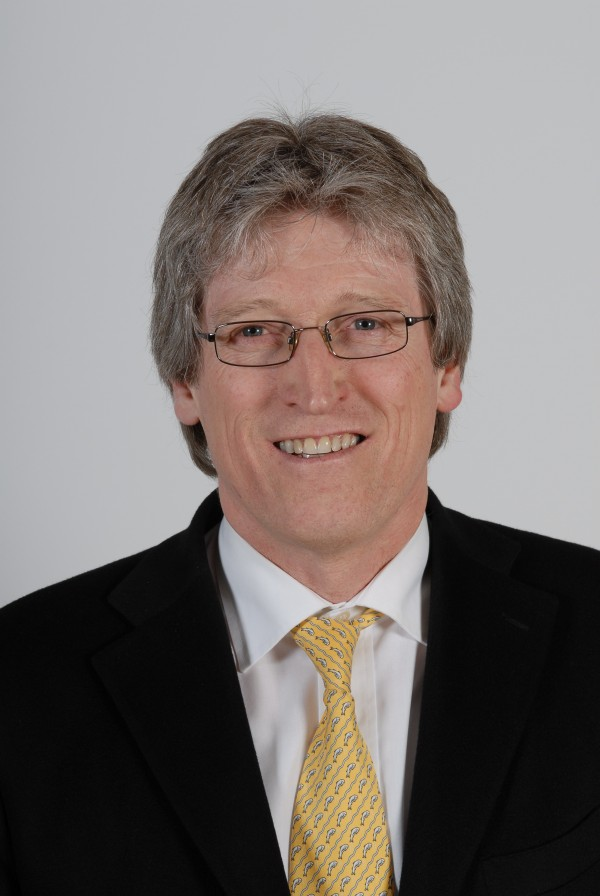
Céleste Lett

Céleste Lett (born 7 May 1951 in Sarreguemines, Moselle) is a member of the National Assembly of France. He represents the Moselle department, and is a member of the Union for a Popular Movement.

He has three sons: Jean-Francois, Philippe, and Alexandre.
