= List of mayors of El Paso, Texas =

Mayor of El Paso
- Flag of the City of El Paso

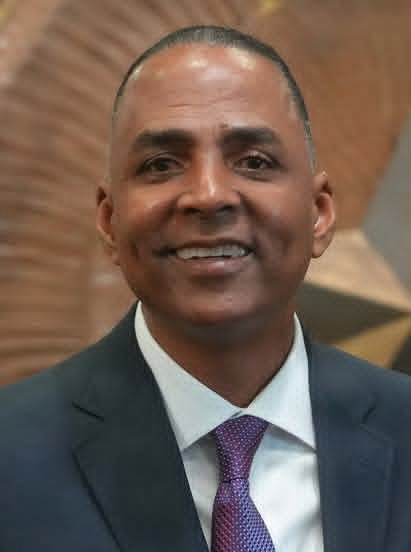
- Incumbent; Renard Johnson since January 6, 2025
- Term length: Four years, Two Term Limit
- Inaugural holder: Ben S. Dowell; 1873
- Formation: 1873
- Salary: $95000 As of 2024
- Website: www.elpasotexas.gov/mayor/

The following is a list of people who have served as mayors of the city of El Paso in the U.S state of Texas.

== List of Mayors of El Paso ==
Image	Mayor	Term
	Ben S. Dowell	1873–1875
	Melton A. Jones	1875–1876
	Solomon Shultz	1880–1881
	Joseph Magoffin	1881–1885
	C. Lightbody	1885–1889
	Richard Caples	1889–1893
	W. H. Austin	1893–1894
	Adolph Solomon	1894
	A. K. Albers	1894
	Robert Campbell	1895–1897
	Joseph Magoffin	1897–1901
	Ben F. Hammett	1901–1903
	Charles Robert Morehead Jr.	1903–1905
	Charles Davis	1905–1907
	Joseph Sweeney	1907–1910
	W. F. Robinson	1910
	Charles E. Kelly	1910–1915
	Tom Lea	1915–1917
	Charles Davis	1917–1923
	R. M. Dudley	1923–1925
	H. P. Jackson	1925–1927
	R. Ewing Thomason	1927–1931
	A. B. Poe	1931
	R. E. Sherman	1931–1937
	M. A. Harlan	1937–1938
	J. E. Anderson	1938–1947
	Dan R. Ponder	1947–1949
	Dan L. P. Duke	1949–1951
	Fred Hervey	1951–1955
	W. T. Misenhimer	1955
	Tom E. Rogers	1955–1957
	Raymond Telles	1957–1961
	Ralph Seitsinger	1961–1963
	Judson F. Williams	1963–1969
	Ashley G. Classen	1969
	Peter De Wetter	1969–1971
	Bert Williams	1971–1973
	Fred Hervey	1973–1975
	Don Henderson	1975–1977
	Ray Salazar	1977–1979
	Thomas D. Westfall	1979–1981
	Jonathan W. Rogers	1981–1989
	Suzanne S. Azar	1989–1991
	William S. Tilney	1991–1993
	Larry Francis	1993–1997
	Carlos Ramirez	1997–2001
	Raymond Caballero	June 9, 2001 – June 10, 2003
	Joe Wardy	June 10, 2003 – June 13, 2005
	John Cook	June 13, 2005 – June 24, 2013
	Oscar Leeser	June 24, 2013 – June 26, 2017
	Dee Margo	June 27, 2017 – January 5, 2021
	Oscar Leeser	January 5, 2021 – January 6, 2025
	Renard Johnson	January 6, 2025 – present
